= List of mergers in Kumamoto Prefecture =

Here is a list of mergers in Kumamoto Prefecture, Japan since the Heisei era.

== Mergers before April 1, 1999 ==
- On February 1, 1991 - the towns of Akita, Hokubu, Kawachi and Tenmei (all from Hōtaku District) were merged into the expanded city of Kumamoto. Hōtaku District was dissolved as a result of this merger.

== Mergers from April 1, 1999 to Present ==
- On April 1, 2003 - the town of Menda, and the villages of Fukada, Ōkaharu, Sue and Ue (all from Kuma District) were merged to create the town of Asagiri.
- On March 31, 2004 - the towns of Himedo, Matsushima, Ōyano and Ryūgatake (all from Amakusa District) were merged to create the city of Kami-Amakusa.
- On November 1, 2004 - the towns of Chūō and Tomochi (both from Shimomashiki District) were merged to create the town of Misato.
- On January 1, 2005 - the town of Tanoura (from Ashikita District) was merged into the expanded town of Ashikita.
- On January 15, 2005 - the towns of Misumi and Shiranuhi (both from Uto District), and the towns of Matsubase, Ogawa and Toyono (all from Shimomashiki District) were merged to create the city of Uki. Uto District was dissolved as a result of this merger.
- On January 15, 2005 - the old city of Yamaga absorbed the towns of Kahoku, Kamoto, Kaō and Kikuka (all from Kamoto District) to create the new and expanded city of Yamaga.
- On February 11, 2005 - the former town of Aso absorbed the town of Ichinomiya, and the village of Namino (all from Aso District) to create the city of Aso.
- On February 11, 2005 - the town of Yabe, the village of Seiwa (both from Kamimashiki District), and the town of Soyō (from Aso District) were merged to create the town of Yamato (in Kamimashiki District).
- On February 13, 2005 - the villages of Chōyō, Hakusui and Kugino (all from Aso District) were merged to create the village of Minamiaso.
- On March 22, 2005 - the old city of Kikuchi absorbed the towns of Shichijo and Shisui, and the village of Kyokushi (all from Kikuchi District) to create the new and expanded city of Kikuchi.
- On August 1, 2005 - the old city of Yatsushiro absorbed the towns of Kagami and Senchō, and the towns of Izumi, Sakamoto and Tōyō (all from Yatsushiro District) to create the new and expanded city of Yatsushiro.
- On October 1, 2005 - the towns of Miyahara and Ryūhoku (both from Yatsushiro District) were merged to create the town of Hikawa.
- On October 3, 2005 - the old city of Tamana absorbed the towns of Taimei, Tensui and Yokoshima (all from Tamana District) to create the new and expanded city of Tamana.
- On February 27, 2006 - the former town of Kōshi absorbed the town of Nishigoshi (both from Kikuchi District) to create the city of Kōshi.
- On March 1, 2006 - the towns of Kikusui and Mikawa (both from Tamana District) were merged to create the town of Nagomi.
- On March 27, 2006 - the former town of Amakusa absorbed the cities of Hondo and Ushibuka, the towns of Ariake, Goshoura, Itsuwa, Kawaura, Kuratake, Shinwa and Sumoto (all from Amakusa District) to create the city of Amakusa.
- On October 6, 2008 - the town of Tomiai (from Shimomashiki District) was merged into the expanded city of Kumamoto.
- On March 23, 2010 - the town of Jōnan (from Shimomashiki District), and the town of Ueki (from Kamoto District) was merged into the expanded city of Kumamoto. Kamoto District was dissolved as a result of this merger.
