= Index of Japan-related articles (S) =

This page lists Japan-related articles with romanized titles beginning with the letter S. For names of people, please list by surname (i.e., "Tarō Yamada" should be listed under "Y", not "T"). Please also ignore particles (e.g. "a", "an", "the") when listing articles (i.e., "A City with No People" should be listed under "City").

== S ==
- S-VHS

== Sa ==
- Saaya Irie
- Saba District, Yamaguchi
- Sabae, Fukui
- Saber Marionette
- Sada, Shimane
- Sadaharu Oh
- Sadamitsu, Tokushima
- Sado Province
- Sado, Niigata
- Sadowara, Miyazaki
- Sae Isshiki
- Saeki District, Hiroshima
- Saeki, Okayama
- SaGa
- Saga District, Saga
- Saga Prefecture
- Saga, Kōchi
- Saga, Saga
- Sagae, Yamagata
- Sagami Bay
- Sagami-ji
- Sagami Province
- Saganoseki, Ōita
- Sagamihara, Kanagawa
- Sagara, Kumamoto
- Sagara, Shizuoka
- Issei Sagawa
- Kenji Sahara
- Sai, Aomori
- Sai Shoki
- Saibashi
- Saichō
- Saigawa, Fukuoka
- Saigo, Miyazaki
- Saigo, Shimane
- Saigō Takamori
- Saihaku District, Tottori
- Saihaku, Tottori
- Saijō, Ehime
- Saijō, Hiroshima (Kamo)
- Saijō, Hiroshima (Shōbara)
- Saikaidō
- Saiki, Ōita
- Saikyō Line
- Sailor Moon
- Saint Seiya
- Saionji Kinmochi
- Saita, Kagawa
- Saitama Prefecture
- Saitama University
- Saitama, Saitama
- Saitama-Shintoshin Station
- Saitō Dōsan
- Saitō Hajime
- Saitō Makoto
- Morihiro Saito
- Saitō Tatsuoki
- Saito, Miyazaki
- Saji, Tottori
- Saka, Hiroshima
- Sakabato
- Sakado, Saitama
- Hironobu Sakaguchi
- Sakahogi, Gifu
- Hiroyuki Sakai
- Saburō Sakai
- Toshihiko Sakai
- Sakai, Osaka
- Stan Sakai
- Sakaide, Kagawa
- Sakaiminato, Tottori
- Sakamoto, Kumamoto
- Kyu Sakamoto
- Maaya Sakamoto
- Sakamoto Ryōma
- Ken Sakamura
- Sakanoue no Tamuramaro
- Sakashita, Gifu
- Sakata, Yamagata
- Sakata District, Shiga
- Sakata Tōjūrō
- Sakauchi, Gifu
- Sakawa, Kōchi
- Sake
- Sakhalin
- Sakishima Islands
- Saku, Nagano
- Saku, Nagano (Minamisaku)
- Sakugi, Hiroshima
- Sakuma Morimasa
- Sakuma Shōzan
- Sakuma, Shizuoka
- Sakura
- Sakura Wars
- Sakura, Chiba
- Motoi Sakuraba
- Sakurae, Shimane
- Sakura Gakuin
- Sakurai, Nara
- Sakurajima, Kagoshima
- Sakuto, Okayama
- Samebito
- SameGame
- Samukawa, Kanagawa
- Samurai
- Samurai I: Musashi Miyamoto
- Samurai Shodown
- Samurai Trilogy
- Samurai-dokoro
- Samus Aran
- Sanada Masayuki
- Sanada Yukimura
- Sanagōchi, Tokushima
- Sanbo
- Sanbo Kyodan
- Sanda, Hyogo
- Sand Land
- Sandō
- Sango (InuYasha)
- Sango, Nara
- Sangokujin
- Sangokushi
- Sanjo, Niigata
- Sanjuro
- Sankei Shimbun
- Sankei Sports
- Sankō, Ōita
- Sanmon
- Sannan, Hyōgo
- Sannomiya Station
- Sano, Tochigi
- Sanrio
- Sansei
- Santo, Hyogo
- Santo, Shiga
- Alessandro dos Santos
- Sanuki Province
- Sanuki, Kagawa
- Sanwa, Hiroshima
- Sanyo
- San'yō Main Line
- Sanyō Shinkansen
- Sanyō, Okayama
- Sanyo, Yamaguchi
- Sanyō-Onoda, Yamaguchi
- Sanyutei Encho
- Sanzo Nosaka
- Saori, Aichi
- Sapporo Agricultural College
- Sapporo Snow Festival
- Sapporo
- Sarin gas attack on the Tokyo subway
- Sarubobo
- Sasaguri, Fukuoka
- Kazuhiro Sasaki
- Sasaki Kojirō
- Sasaki Mitsuzo
- Sasayama, Hyogo
- Sasebo, Nagasaki
- Sashiki, Okinawa
- Sashiko quilting
- Sashimi
- Sata, Kagoshima
- Eisaku Satō
- Junya Sato
- Mikio Sato
- Takuma Sato
- Satori
- Satosho, Okayama
- Ernest M. Satow
- Satsuma District, Kagoshima
- Satsuma Province
- Satsuma Rebellion
- Satsuma, Kagoshima
- Satsumasendai, Kagoshima
- Satte, Saitama
- Miyū Sawai
- Tetsu Sawaki
- Sawara, Chiba
- Saya, Aichi
- Sayama, Saitama
- Sayo District, Hyogo
- Sayo, Hyogo
- Sayonara
- Sazae-san

== Sc ==
- Scabbard
- Sciadopitys
- Schwarz Stein
- Scout Association of Japan
- s-CRY-ed

== Sd ==
- SDF-1 Macross

== Se ==
- Sea of Japan
- Sea of Japan naming dispute
- Sea of Okhotsk
- Seal (Chinese)
- Sealeo
- Secondary education in Japan
- Secret Life of Japan
- Sefuri, Saga
- Sega
- Sega 32X
- Sega Dreamcast
- Sega Genesis
- Sega Mega Drive
- Sega Meganet
- Sega NAOMI
- Sega Saturn
- Segata Sanshiro
- Sei Shōnagon
- Seibu Lions
- Seicho-No-Ie
- Seidan, Hyogo
- Seidokaikan
- Seifuku no jijitsu
- Seiganto-ji
- Seiji Ozawa
- Seijōgakuen-Mae Station
- Seika, Kyoto
- Seikan Tunnel
- Seiken Densetsu
- Seiko
- Seinen
- Seishin-Yamate Line
- Seiwa, Kumamoto
- Seiwa, Mie
- Seiza
- Seki, Gifu
- Seki Takakazu
- Tomokazu Seki
- Seki, Mie
- Sekigahara, Gifu
- Sekigane, Tottori
- Sekihan
- Sekizen, Ehime
- Seme
- Sen no Rikyū
- Senboku District, Osaka
- Sencho, Kumamoto
- Sendai Daikannon
- Sendai, Miyagi
- Sengoku period
- Senkaku Islands
- Sennan, Osaka
- Sennan District, Osaka
- Senryū
- Sensei
- Sentō
- Seoul National University
- Seppuku
- Sera District, Hiroshima
- Sera, Hiroshima
- Seranishi, Hiroshima
- Serial Experiments Lain
- Sesshin
- Sesshō and Kampaku
- Sesshōmaru
- Sesson Yūbai
- Setagaya, Tokyo
- Setaka, Fukuoka
- Seto, Aichi
- Seto Inland Sea
- Seto Kaiba
- Seto, Ehime
- Seto, Okayama
- Setoda, Hiroshima
- Setouchi, Kagoshima
- Setsubun
- Settsu, Osaka
- Settsu Province
- Seven Lucky Gods
- Seven Samurai

== Sh ==
- Shadow the Hedgehog
- Shaka at Birth (Tōdai-ji)
- Shakkazombie
- Shaku (ritual baton)
- Shaku (unit of length)
- Shakuhachi
- Shaman King
- Shamisen
- Shamoji
- Sharaku
- Sharp Corporation
- Sharp Zaurus
- Shasekishū
- She, The Ultimate Weapon
- Shenmue
- Shiatsu
- Shiba Inu
- Ryotaro Shiba
- Shibakawa, Shizuoka
- Kitasato Shibasaburō
- Shibata, Niigata
- Shibata Katsuie
- Shibetsu, Hokkaidō
- Shibori
- Shibukawa, Gunma
- Shibushi, Kagoshima
- Shibuya Station
- Shibuya, Tokyo
- Shichidō garan
- Shichi Narabe
- Shichi-Go-San
- Shichijo, Kumamoto
- Shida District, Shizuoka
- Kijūrō Shidehara
- Philipp Franz von Siebold
- Shift JIS
- Shiga District, Shiga
- Naoya Shiga
- Shiga Prefecture
- Shiga, Shiga
- Shigaraki, Shiga
- Shigechiyo Izumi
- Shigefumi Hino
- Shigematsu Sakaibara
- Mamoru Shigemitsu
- Shigenobu, Ehime
- Fusako Shigenobu
- Shigeru Miyamoto
- Shiiba, Miyazaki
- Shiida, Fukuoka
- Eihi Shiina
- Ringo Shiina
- Shiitake
- Shijonawate, Osaka
- Shikama District, Hyogo
- Shikano, Tottori
- Shikantaza
- Shikatsu, Aichi
- Shiki District, Nara
- Shiki, Saitama
- Shikken
- Shikoku
- Shikoku Pilgrimage
- Shima, Fukuoka
- Shima, Mie
- Shima District, Mie
- Masatoshi Shima
- Shima Province
- Shimabara Rebellion
- Shimabara, Nagasaki
- Shimada, Shizuoka
- Shimada Ichiro
- Shimagahara, Mie
- Shimajiri, Okinawa
- Shimaki Kensaku
- Shimamoto, Osaka
- Shimane Prefecture
- Shimane, Shimane
- Shimano
- Shimazaki Toson
- Shime, Fukuoka
- Shimizu Satomu
- Takashi Shimizu
- Shimizu Yoshinori
- Shimizu, Shizuoka
- Shimizu, Wakayama
- Shimoda, Shizuoka
- Shimodate, Ibaraki
- Shimoge District, Ōita
- Shimoichi, Nara
- Shimoji, Okinawa
- Shimokitayama, Nara
- Shimomashiki District, Kumamoto
- Yoko Shimomura
- Shimonoseki, Yamaguchi
- Shimotsu, Wakayama
- Shimotsuke Province
- Shimotsuma, Ibaraki
- Shimōsa Province
- Shimoyama, Aichi
- Goro Shimura
- Takashi Shimura

== Sh (cont'd) ==
- Shin Takahashi
- Shin-Kobe Station
- Shin Kokinshū
- Shin-Ōsaka Station
- Shinagawa Station
- Shinagawa, Tokyo
- Shinai
- Shinano Province
- Shinasahi, Shiga
- Shozo Shimamoto
- Shimbashi Station
- Shinbutsu bunri
- Shinbutsu-shūgō
- Kaneto Shindo
- Tsukihime, Lunar Legend
- Shingo, Okayama
- Shingon Buddhism
- Shingon Risshu
- Shingon-shū Chisan-ha
- Shingū, Ehime
- Shingu, Fukuoka
- Shingu, Hyogo
- Shingu, Wakayama
- Shinichiro Watanabe
- Shinidamachū
- Shinji, Shimane
- Shinjō, Yamagata
- Shinjo, Okayama
- Shinjo, Nara
- Shinjuku ni-chōme, Tokyo
- Shinjuku Station
- Shinjuku, Tokyo
- Makoto Shinkai
- Shinkaichi Station
- Shinkansen
- Shinkawa, Aichi
- ShinMaywa US-1
- Shinminato, Toyama
- Shinnyo-en
- Shinobi (video game)
- Masahiro Shinoda
- Tetsuo Shinohara
- Yoshio Shinozuka
- Shinran
- Shinsengumi
- Shinshiro, Aichi
- Shintaido
- Shinto
- Shinto music
- Shintomi, Miyazaki
- Shinwa, Kumamoto
- Shinyoshitomi, Fukuoka
- Shiogama, Miyagi
- Shiojiri, Nagano
- Shionoe, Kagawa
- Shiota, Saga
- Shippo, Aichi
- Shirahama, Wakayama
- Shirakawa, Fukushima
- Shirakawa, Gifu
- Shiraki Shizu
- Shirako
- Shiranuhi, Kumamoto
- Yuri Shiratori
- Shiribeshi Subprefecture
- Shiritori
- Shiroi, Chiba
- Shiroishi, Miyagi
- Shiroishi, Saga
- Shirokawa, Ehime
- Shirone, Niigata
- Masamune Shirow
- Shishikui, Tokushima
- Shiso
- Shisui, Kumamoto
- Shitara, Aichi
- Shito ryu
- Shitsuki District, Okayama
- Shizuoka Prefecture
- Shizuoka Shimbun
- Shizuoka, Shizuoka
- Shōbara, Hiroshima
- Shōbōgenzō
- Shōe
- Shogi
- Shogi variant
- Shōgun
- Shoboku, Okayama
- Shodokan Aikido
- Shōhō-ji (Gifu)
- Shoin
- Shōjo
- Shokawa, Gifu
- Shomuni
- Shonai, Fukuoka
- Shōnai, Ōita
- Shonan
- Shonan-Shinjuku Line
- Shōnen
- Shōnen-ai
- Shonen Knife
- Shōnen Sunday
- Shoo, Okayama
- Shōrin-ryū
- Shorinji Kempo
- Shōrō
- Shoshin
- Shōsōin
- Shotacon
- Shotokan
- Shōnen-ai
- Shōwa period
- Shōzu District, Kagawa
- Shuchi District, Shizuoka
- Shueisha
- Shugendō
- Shugo
- Shuho, Yamaguchi
- Shūnan, Yamaguchi
- Shuntō
- Shuriken
- Shuriken-jutsu
- Shūsō District, Ehime
- Shuto, Yamaguchi
- Shuto Expressway

== Si ==
- Siddham script
- Siege of Inabayama Castle
- Siege of Marune
- Siege of Miki
- Siege of Noda
- Siege of Odani
- Siege of Osaka
- Siege of Ōtsu
- Siege of Takamatsu
- Siege of Terabe
- Sieges of Nagashima
- Siege of Takatenjin (1574)
- Siege of Takatenjin (1581)
- Silent Hill
- The Silent Service
- Sino-Japanese vocabulary
- Sino-Japanese War (1894-1895)
- Sino-Japanese War (1937-1945)
- Sister Princess
- Six best Waka poets

== Sk ==
- Skies of Arcadia
- Sky Dream Fukuoka
- Skymark Airlines

== Sl ==
- Slam Dunk (manga)
- Slayers
- Slime MoriMori Dragon Quest: Shougeki No Shippo Dan
- Slow Step

== Sm ==
- SMAP

== Sn ==
- SNK Playmore
- SNK vs. Capcom (series)

== So ==
- Sōran Bushi
- Soba
- Sōbu Main Line
- Sobue, Aichi
- Social Democratic Party (Japan)
- Sodanyaku
- Sodegaura, Chiba
- Soeda, Fukuoka
- Soekami District, Nara
- SoftBank
- SoftBank Mobile
- Machiko Soga
- Sohyo
- Sōja
- Sōji-ji
- Sōjōbō
- Sōjutsu
- Sōka Gakkai
- Sōka University (Japan)
- Soka, Saitama
- Sokoban
- Sokuhi Nyoitsu
- Solid Snake
- Sōma, Fukushima
- Sōmen
- Sōmon
- Son of Godzilla
- Son Gohan
- Son Goku (Dragon Ball)
- Son Goten
- Soni, Nara
- Sonic Advance 2
- Sonic Adventure
- Sonic Adventure 2
- Sonic Crackers
- Sonic Eraser
- Sonic Heroes
- Sonic Team
- Sonic the Hedgehog
- Sonic the Hedgehog (1991 video game)
- Sonic the Hedgehog (8-bit)
- Sonic the Hedgehog 2
- Sonic the Hedgehog 2 (8-bit)
- Sonic the Hedgehog 3
- Sonic the Hedgehog CD
- Sonic X
- Sonnō jōi
- Sonobe, Kyoto
- Sony
- Sony Ericsson
- Soo District, Kagoshima
- Sorachi Subprefecture
- Soraku District, Kyoto
- Sorcerous Stabber Orphen
- Sōrin
- Sōryō, Hiroshima
- Sōtō
- Soul Blazer
- Soul Calibur
- South Manchuria Railway
- Southern All Stars
- Southern Expeditionary Army Group
- Soy sauce
- Sōya Subprefecture
- Soybean
- Soyo, Kumamoto

== Sp ==
- Space Battleship Yamato
- Space Channel 5
- Space Invaders
- Speed Racer
- Spirited Away
- Spitz (band)
- Sports Hochi

== Sq ==
- Square Enix
- Square Co.

== St ==
- Star Fox (series)
- Starmie
- Staryu
- Steel Battalion
- Stellvia of the Universe
- Stephen K. Hayes
- Strait of Tartary
- Street Fighter
- Street Fighter 2
- Street Fighter II The Movie
- Stroke order
- Studio Ghibli

== Su ==
- Subaru
- Subaru (telescope)
- Subaru Impreza
- Subaru Impreza WRX
- Subaru Legacy
- Subprefectures of Japan
- Subprefectures in Hokkaidō
- Issei Suda
- Sue, Fukuoka
- Sueyoshi, Kagoshima
- Sugamo Prison
- Sugawara no Takasue no musume
- Sugi
- Chiune Sugihara
- Ken Sugimori
- Suginami, Tokyo
- Sugita Genpaku
- Koichi Sugiyama
- Sugoroku
- Suica
- Suihou Tagawa
- Suikinkutsu
- Suikoden
- Suishō
- Suita, Osaka
- Suki, Miyazaki
- Sukiyaki
- Sukagawa, Fukushima
- Suken
- Sukumo, Kōchi
- Sumida, Tokyo
- Sumiyo, Kagoshima
- Sumiyoshi Park
- Sumo
- Sumoto, Hyōgo
- Sumoto, Kumamoto
- Sunagawa, Hokkaidō
- Sunomata, Gifu
- Sunrise (company)
- Sunto District, Shizuoka
- Masayuki Suo
- Suō Province
- The Super Dimension Fortress Macross
- The Super Dimension Fortress Macross: Do You Remember Love?
- The Super Dimension Fortress Macross: Flash Back 2012
- Super Famicom
- Super Mario 64
- Super Mario All-Stars
- Super Mario Bros.
- Super Mario Bros. 3
- Super Mario Land
- Super Mario RPG
- Super Mario World
- Super Mario World 2: Yoshi's Island
- Super Mario World: Super Mario Advance 2
- Super Metroid
- Super Mushroom
- Super Nintendo Entertainment System
- Super Saiyan
- Super Smash Bros. Melee
- Super Sonic
- Super Street Fighter 2 Turbo
- Super-Kamiokande
- Super deformed
- Supreme Commander of the Allied Powers
- Suribachi and surikogi
- Surimi
- Suruga Province
- Susa, Yamaguchi
- Susaki, Kōchi
- Susami, Wakayama
- Susanoo
- Sushi
- Susono, Shizuoka
- Susuwatari
- Suwa, Nagano
- Suwa Province
- Suzaka, Nagano
- Suzakumon
- Suzu
- Suzaka, Nagano
- Suzuka District, Mie
- Suzuki
- Ichiro Suzuki
- Kantarō Suzuki
- Suzuki method
- Suzuki Miekichi
- Seijun Suzuki
- Shunryu Suzuki
- Suzuki SV650
- Yu Suzuki
- Zenko Suzuki
- Kenichi Suzumura

== Sw ==
- Sword

== Sy ==
- Syllabary

== Sz ==
- Sichuan pepper
