= Ōnyūdō =

Japanese supernatural monster

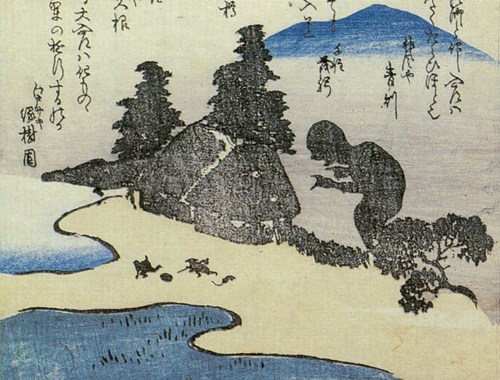
"Ōnyūdō" from the Kyōka Hyaku Monogatari by Masasumi Ryūkansaijin

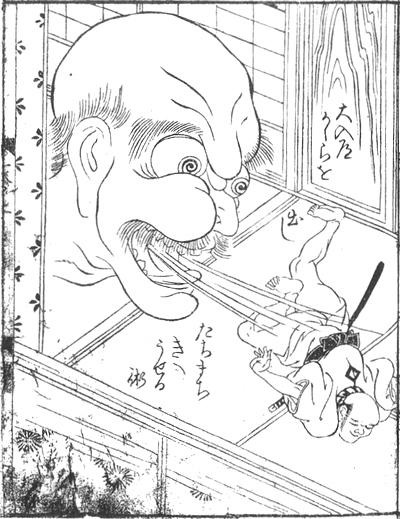
An ōnyūdō depicted in "Tengu-tsū" by Sukeyo Hirase. It was not a yōkai, but rather an artificial one created through magic using a magic lantern.

Ōnyūdō is a type of yōkai, or supernatural creature, found in Japanese folklore.

== Summary ==
The name Ōnyūdō means "big monk." However, depending on the region, legends vary: in some accounts, their appearance is described as a vague shadow or giant than a monk. Those depicted as resembling a monk (bōzu) are also referred to as Ōbōzu. Their reported size ranges from about 2 meters in height to giants as large as mountains.

Many legends portray Ōnyūdō as menacing figures, with stories claiming that those who see one may fall ill. In some tales, they are said to be foxes (kitsune) or tanuki in disguise, or even stone pagodas that have transformed into living beings. However, in many cases, their true identity remains unknown.

== Legends by area ==
=== Ōnyūdō that inflict harm on people ===
Example from Hokkaido
During the Kaei era, an Ōnyūdō was said to have appeared in an Ainu village near the Lake Shikotsu ridge and Mount Fuppushidake. According to legend, those who were stared at by its large eyes would faint as if their ki (qi) had been disturbed.
Example from Tokyo
In 1937 (Shōwa 12), during the Second World War, individuals delivering "red letters" (military summons notices printed on red paper) were reportedly attacked at the Hachiman level crossing near Akabane Station by an Ōnyūdō resembling a soldier. One such person is said to have died an unnatural death four days later. According to some accounts, the Ōnyūdō's true identity was either the ghost of a conscript who had committed suicide or a soldier beaten to death by his superiors after being criticized for failure. It is also said that, in that area, no one subsequently received a red letter. This is considered an unusual example of a human spirit becoming an Ōnyūdō.

=== Ōnyūdō that help people ===
In Azashiro, Takawagawara village, Myōzai District, Awa Province (now Ishii, Myōzai District, Tokushima Prefecture), it was said that leaving rice in the water wheel of a creek would cause an Ōnyūdō approximately two jō and eight shaku in height (about 8.5 meters) to appear. The Ōnyūdō would hull the rice for the person who left it. However, anyone who watched the hulling process would be menaced by it.

=== Ōnyūdō that animals turn into ===
Example from Iwate Prefecture
According to an oral tradition from Shiwa District, Iwate Prefecture, recorded in "Itachi no Kai (鼬の怪)" (The Weasel Monster) by Bokuseki Tamamushi:
At Kōden-ji in the Daijikō field of Tokuta, a mysterious fire reportedly flared up every night in the main temple building. From its shadow, a frightening Ōnyūdō would appear, prompting the temple’s supporters to appoint night watchmen. As the incidents occurred nightly, suspicions grew that it might be the work of a fox or tanuki. One winter morning, after a light snowfall, villagers followed weasel tracks from the temple to a small wooden shed. Upon removing the fireplace where the tracks led, they found a weasel's nest. The old weasel inside was captured and killed. Following this, the mysterious fire and the Ōnyūdō reportedly ceased to appear.
Example from the Miyagi Prefecture
At Mount Isedō near Sendai, there was a large rock said to emit a groaning sound each night. Some stories claimed it could transform into a towering Ōnyūdō. The feudal lord Date Masamune, suspicious of the phenomenon, ordered an investigation. His servants confirmed the appearance of the Ōnyūdō but reported being unable to deal with it. Masamune himself went to confront it and, upon arrival, encountered a large groaning voice followed by the appearance of an unusually large nyūdō. Unfazed, he shot an arrow at its foot. With a death cry, the nyūdō vanished, revealing an otter the size of a calf. The creature was believed to have been the source of the phenomenon. The hill has since been called Unarizaka ("groaning hill").
Unarizaka still exists in Aoba-ku, Sendai, but a local stone monument attributes the name to the groaning sounds of calves carrying loads uphill, a more widely accepted explanation than the yōkai tale.

=== Other ōnyūdō ===
Example from Toyama Prefecture
In Kurobekyō valley, Shimoniikawa District, Etchū Province, 16 Ōnyūdō were said to have appeared, startling visitors at Kanetsuri Onsen. They were described as being five to six jō tall (about 15–18 meters) and emitting a beautiful seven-colored aureola. Because this phenomenon resembled the halo effect of the Brocken spectre, some suggest the sightings were caused by the shadows of hot spring visitors refracted in the onsen's steam.
Example from Ehime Prefecture
In the mid-Edo period, near Toyobashi Bridge in Mikawa Province, a secondhand clothing merchant traveling to Nagoya reportedly encountered an Ōnyūdō about one jō and three to four shaku tall (around four meters), making it one of the smaller reported examples.
Example from Shiga Prefecture
Volume sixteen of the Edo-period miscellany "Getsudō Kenbun Shū (月堂見聞集)" contains an account titled "Ibukiyama Iji (伊吹山異事)" describing the following: One autumn night, during heavy rain at the base of Mount Ibuki, the earth reportedly shook. An Ōnyūdō appeared from the fields, its body lit by torchlight. Villagers were alarmed by the sound of its footsteps, but elders restrained them from fleeing. When the sound stopped, they found the grass along the road burned all the way to the mountain’s peak. According to the elders, the Ōnyūdō had walked from Lake Myōjin to the peak of Mount Ibuki, marking it as one of the larger reported specimens.
Example from Hyōgo Prefecture
According to the "Nishihari Kaidan Jikki (西播怪談実記)", in September of an Enpō-era year, a man named Mizutani (水谷) was hunting at night in Harima Province when he reportedly saw an Ōnyūdō so large it appeared to straddle a mountain. It was rumored to have been a mountain god warning against killing animals.
In Sayō District, during the Genroku era, a man named Heishirō Kajiya was fishing at night when he encountered an Ōnyūdō about three meters tall pulling on his net from upstream. Unshaken, he followed it until it disappeared several hundred meters away.
Also in Sayō District, a man named Gosuke Hayase was walking in the dark with a companion when they encountered an Ōnyūdō of similar size blocking their path. They fled, but Hayase found that his companion had vanished.
Example from Kumamoto Prefecture
In Shimagōko field, Toyono, Shimomashiki District, Kumamoto Prefecture (now part of Uki), there is a hill called Ima ni mo Saka. In the past, an Ōnyūdō was said to appear there, startling passersby. People later claimed that if one spoke about the phenomenon while passing the hill, a voice would reply "ima ni mo" ("even now"), after which the Ōnyūdō would appear. The hill's name is derived from this story.

== Ōnyūdō in festivals ==
Ōnyūdō of Yokkaichi

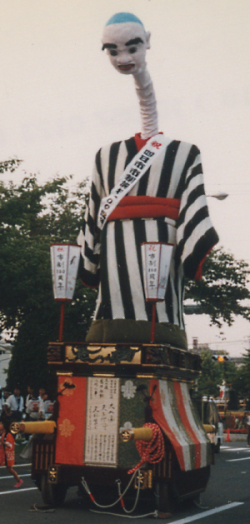
Ōnyūdō of the Yokkaichi Festival

In Yokkaichi, Mie Prefecture, the annual Yokkaichi Festival, held each October at Suwa-jinja, features a festival float depicting an Ōnyūdō. The float is designated as a Tangible Folk Cultural Property of Mie Prefecture. It originates from Okeno (now Nakanaya), a parishioner district of Suwa-jinja, and is believed to have been created during the Bunka era (1804–1818). As part of the city's religious festivities, it is thought that the use of the characters 大化 (Taika) was intended to correspond to the town name "Oke." The float is considered to be an elaboration of a costume parade event known as "Bakemono Tsukushi" (化け物尽くし) ("Procession of Monsters").
A local folktale is associated with the float. According to legend, a tanuki settled in the cellar of a soy sauce shop in Okeno, damaging agricultural produce and harassing residents by transforming into an Ōnyūdō. The townspeople created a large Ōnyūdō doll to confront it. In response, the tanuki transformed into an even larger Ōnyūdō. The townspeople then built a doll with a flexible neck. During the final confrontation, the doll demonstrated its neck-extension ability, prompting the tanuki to give up and flee.
The Ōnyūdō figure mounted on the festival float stands about 2.2 meters tall, with an overall body height of approximately 3.9 meters. Its neck, about 2.2 meters long before extension, can extend further. The large mechanical doll can also protrude its tongue and move its eyeballs. Paper dolls of the Ōnyūdō with extendable necks are sold locally as souvenirs. The figure also appears in the city's summer event, the Daiyokkaichi Festival, and serves as a symbol of Yokkaichi.

== See also ==
- List of legendary creatures from Japan
