= Odara Kofun =

- 小田良古墳 (Japanese)
- Odara Kofun Odara Kofun (Japan)
- Interactive map of Odara Kofun
- 32°38′57″N 130°29′37″E
- Type: Kofun
- Periods: Kofun period
- Location: Uki, Kumamoto, Japan
- Region: Kyushu

History
- Built: c.6th century

Site notes
- Public access: Yes (no facilities)

Odara Kofun (小田良古墳) is a Kofun period burial mound, located in the Misumi neighborhood of the city of Uki, Kumamoto Prefecture, Japan. The tumulus was designated a National Historic Site of Japan in 1979.

== Overview ==
The Odara Kofun is located at the tip of a low hill close to the coast on the northern coast of the Uto Peninsula, which juts out west from the center of the prefecture. This tumulu is thought to have been an enpun (円墳)-style round tumulus with a diameter of about 20 meters, but most of the mound has been lost, and materials for the stone burial chamber have been piled up. Archaeological excavations conducted in 1978 confirmed that the area above the tomb is now farmland 7.2 meters above sea level, and the earth had been removed to the point where the upper edge of the stone barrier around the stone chamber was visible on the field. Four sides of the barrier remain, measuring 1.9 meters east–west and 1.85 meters north–south, with the height to the gravel bed inside being 0.65 meters. The barrier is made of shaped sandstone and is 8 centimeters thick. The inside of the stone barrier is divided by two rows of partition stones running east to west, and two sections of corpse beds are set on the north–south and west sides, with round stones the size of a fist laid on the bottom. The central passage between the corpse beds is slightly lower than the corpse beds. Around this stone barrier, some of the piled stones from the walls of the stone chamber remain. The burial chamber was constructed by digging a pit measuring 3.5 meters east to west and 3.2 meters north to south. The entrance to the burial chamber is thought to face west, and there is a V-shaped recess on the west side of the stone barrier. There is also a shallow V-shaped recess in the center of the two rows of partition stones.

The four sides on the stone barrier are decorated with carvings and colors, with four circles on the north side, three circles, two ridges, and two shields on the east side of the back wall, three circles on the south side, and two circles on the west side, all of which are contained within two horizontal lines. The circles are 17-18 centimeters in diameter, with a central hole carved out, two string-like expressions on the top and bottom, and the shield is decorated with patterns, making it important as a stone barrier-type decorated kofun. There is also a red paint that appears to have been applied to the entire tomb, but its condition is poor. Excavated grave goods include knives, small beads, and bells, as well as fragments of human bones. The construction and decorative patterns suggest that the tumulus was built around the late 5th century. In order to prioritize preservation, not everything was excavated, and damaged stone was treated for preservation before being backfilled.Currently, only the outside of the stone chamber can be viewed under the roof. A life-size replica of the interior of the stone chamber, which cannot be seen on-site, is on display at the Kumamoto Prefectural Decorated Burial Mounds Museum.

== See also ==
- List of Historic Sites of Japan (Kumamoto)
- Decorated kofun
