= Suzanne (television personality) =

Japanese television personality

- スザンヌ
- Born: Sae Yamamoto; October 28, 1986 (age 39); Ueki, Kamoto District, Japan
- Education: Daichi Economic University High School
- Occupations: Actress; television personality; singer
- Agent: K Dash Stage
- Height: 1.66 m (5 ft 5 in)
- Spouse: Kazumi Saito (m. 2011; div. 2015)
- Children: 1

Sae Yamamoto (山本 紗衣, Yamamoto Sae; born 28 October 1986) better known as Suzanne (スザンヌ, Suzannu) is a Japanese variety tarento, actress, and singer. She was a member of musical groups Pabo and Aladdin. She is represented with K Dash Stage.

Suzanne dropped out from Daichi Economic University High School (now Daichi University Associate High School). She later re-enrolled from that school in April 2021, and graduated in March 2022.

She is currently studying at Japan University of Economics.

== Personal life ==
Suzanne was born on October 28, 1986, in Ueki, Kamoto District (now Kita-ku, Kumamoto), Kumamoto Prefecture

Suzanne married professional baseball starting pitcher Kazumi Saito in December 2011. Their first child, a son, was born in January 2014. However, only after a year since giving birth to her son, on March 17, 2015, Suzanne announced on her official blog that she had divorced her husband, citing their busy work schedules as the cause of the divorce, though the two promised to co-parent their son and to continue to support each other as friends.

== Discography ==
=== Singles ===
Year	Title	Notes
2007	Pabo "Koi no Hexagon"	
2008	Aladdin "Hi wa, Mata Noboru"	
2008	Hexagon All-Stars "We Love Hexagon"	
2009	Tomo to Suzanne "Deaete Yokatta / Otaiba no Onna"	
2009	Hexagon All-Stars "Naite mo ī desu ka"	
2009	Hexagon All-Stars "We Love Hexagon 2009"	
2010	Pabo "Shiawase ni Narou / Koi"	
2010	Suzanne × Suzannu "Salary Man / Daisan no Otoko / Red Eye"	Limited edition only
2010	Hexagon All-Stars "Bokura ni wa Tsubasa ga aru: Ōzora e"	

=== Videos ===
Year	Title
2007	Kyushu Seishun Ginkō: Suzanne no Suizokukan de Mermaid Show!

== Filmography ==
=== TV series ===
Regular appearances

Year	Title	Network	Notes
2006	Fri Fri Song Book	Fuji TV One Two	
2009	Pon!	NTV	"Tarento" regular Monday appearances
2010	Mame Gohan	RKB	

Quasi-regular appearances

Year	Title	Network	Notes
2007	London Hearts	TV Asahi	
2007	Akko ni Omakase!	TBS	
	School Kakumei!	NTV	Occasional appearances

Former appearances

Year	Title	Network	Notes
2006	Takemi Net	A! To Odoroku Hōsōkyoku	
2006	Peaches no @ Okiniiri	RKB	Quasi-regular appearances
2006	Kyushu Seishun Ginkō	RKB	Regular appearances
2006	Gravure Talk Audition	Fuji TV	
2007	Quiz! Hexagon II	Fuji TV	
2007	Bakushō Red Carpet	Fuji TV	Occasional appearances
2007	Sanma's Karakuri-TV	TBS	
2007	Gyōkai Quiz: Minikite	CTV	Quasi-regular appearances
2008	Taisō no Jikan.	Fuji TV	Monday appearances
2009	Face	RKB	
2009	Nius Zansu	TBS	

Dramas

Year	Title	Role	Network
2008	Muri na Renai	Madoka Himeno	KTV

=== Films ===
Year	Title	Role	Notes
2009	Inubaka: Crazy for Dogs	Suguri Miyauchi	Lead role
2010	Zebraman 2: Attack on Zebra City	Mika Misaki	
2012	Home: Aishi no Zashiki warashi	Restaurant clerk	

=== Voice acting ===
Year	Title	Role	Source
2009	Soreike! Anpanman: Da Dandan to Futago no Hoshi	Killala	
2026	Shin Gekijōban Keroro Gunsō: Fukkatsu Shite Sokkō Chikyū Metsubō no Kiki de Arimasu!	Kumamoto Announcer	

=== Advertisements ===
Title
Takeda Megane
House Foods Umakacchan
Mitsubishi Electric NTT DoCoMo D903iTV
Joyfull
Wideleisure Rakuichi Rakuza – Yume no Wonderland
Zenrin-Datacom Zenrin Chizu+Navi
Happinet Blade Blood of Cason
Kao Essential
DeNA Mobaoku
Cadbury Licaldent
Zensho Sukiya
Kyushu Railway Company Kumamoto Saikō Zansu Kankō campaign
Yukiguni Maitake Yukiguni Moyashi
Yume Pirika

=== Others ===
Year	Title	Notes	Ref.
	Takada Suzanne	Mobile phone series	
2008	Dam Channel	Presenter	
2009	Kyushu Sanko Bus: Kūkō Limousine bus	Car broadcasting announcement	
	CR Dai Komakoma Club @ Suzanne	Game machine	
2013	K Dash Stage no Nagurunara Nagure!!	Episode 96	

=== Music videos ===
Title
Noa "Yakusoku.. feat LGYankees"

== Bibliography ==
=== Photobooks ===
Year	Title	Ref.
2008	Oh! Suzanne	
2008	22	
2011	Second Season	
