= Paul Compitus =

British fashion designer (born 1966)

- Paul Compitus
- Born: 9 April 1966 (age 59); Surrey, England; United Kingdom
- Occupation: Fashion Designer

Paul William Compitus (born 9 April 1966 in Surrey, England) is a fashion designer and educator noted for his sexy, avant-garde, surreal and often futuristic style.

== Life and career ==
Compitus is a British fashion designer who worked for many of the most famous design houses. Although he primarily designed menswear, he ran his own womenswear line, Paul Compitus Fashions, until 1999. As a university lecturer he mentored and taught young designers in both the UK and in the United States. Although his work was photographed for many magazines and seen on several celebrities, he is best known for the pants worn in one of David LaChapelle's "surgery story" photographs as well as for designing costumes for the Stephen Petronio Dance Company.

Compitus attended Kingston University in England, where he received his bachelor's degree in Fashion Design in 1988. He was the first non-Japanese designer to work for the Japanese fashion house Matsuda in 1988–1989. He moved to the United States in 1989.

Compitus has designed for major brands such as Eckō Unltd., Matsuda, Rugby by Ralph Lauren, Charivari, Nautica, Rocawear as well as Whispering Smith. He was a lecturer at Kingston University, where he mentored several winners of the Levi's Young Designers Competition. He also taught at the Fashion Institute of Technology in New York City.

== Magazine references ==
"Russell's Letter" – One World (1997), Fashion Spectrum, Trend People (Italian, 1997), Neo (2005, Spanish), Detour (1997), Harper's Bazar En Espanol, The Face Magazine (June 1997), Interview (April 1997), Surface (1997), Soma, Sweater, Sportswear International, Blackbook (Autumn 1997), Raygun (November 1997), Urb, Details (1998), Paper (1997), Creme & Sugar (No.3)
