= Mazda (disambiguation) =

Mazda is a Japanese automobile manufacturer.

Mazda may also refer to:

- Ahura Mazda, the primary deity of Zoroastrianism
- Mazda (light bulb), a trademarked name used on incandescent light bulbs and vacuum tubes

== People ==
- Meherzan Mazda, Indian film and television actor
- Richard Mazda (born 1955), record producer, writer, musician, actor and director

== Related topics ==
- Matsuda - Japanese surname. The surname of the de facto founder of the above-mentioned automobile manufacturer.
