= Stephen Petronio =

American choreographer

- Born: Stephen Petronio; 20 March 1956; Newark, New Jersey
- Education: Hampshire College
- Organizations: Tanztheater Wuppertal
- Known for: Choreography; Dancing
- Awards: New York Dance & Performance Award (Bessie) (1986); The First American Choreographer Awards (1987); NEA choreography fellowships (1985-1988); New York State Council on the Arts (consecutively since 1988); Foundation for Contemporary Arts Grants to Artists Award (1999); Guggenheim Fellowship (1999); New York Foundation for the Arts (1985 and 2004)

Stephen Petronio (born March 20, 1956) is an American choreographer, dancer, and the artistic director of New York City-based Stephen Petronio Company.

== Early life and career ==
Stephen Petronio was born in Newark, New Jersey. He grew up in nearby Nutley and graduated in 1974 from Nutley High School. He received a B.A. degree from Hampshire College in Amherst, Massachusetts, where he began dancing in 1974. Before pursuing a dance career, Petronio studied pre-medicine before being inspired by the dancing of Rudolf Nureyev and Steve Paxton, with whom he studied contact improvisation. From 1982 to 1987 he was a member of Channel Z, an improvisation performance ensemble based in New York City. Other members of the ensemble included Daniel Lepkoff, Diane Madden, Robin Feld, Randy Warschaw, Paul Langland, and Nina Martin. Petronio became the first male dancer of the Trisha Brown Company (1979 to 1986), and founded Stephen Petronio Company in 1984. He has gone on to develop a distinctive and powerful language of movement in a career spanning over 35 years. The Stephen Petronio Company has toured extensively across the United States and to 26 other countries worldwide, with over 35 New York City engagements, including 15 seasons at The Joyce Theater.

Petronio has worked with songwriters, musicians, and composers, including Rufus Wainwright (Bud, 2005, Bud Suite, 2006, and BLOOM, 2006), Laurie Anderson (City of Twist, 2002), Lou Reed (The Island of Misfit Toys, 2004), Michael Nyman (Strange Attractors, 1999), James Lavelle (Strange Attractors II, 2000), Wire (MiddleSexGorge, 1990), Diamanda Galás (#4, 1997), Sheila Chandra (Not Garden, 1999), Lenny Pickett (#3, 1986), Nick Cave (Underland, 2003), Fischerspooner (Beauty and the Brut, 2008), Jonny Greenwood (Ghostown, 2010), Ryan Lott (Tragic/Love, 2009 and Singing Light, 2010), Nico Muhly (I Drink the Air Before Me, 2009), David Linton (numerous works, 1986–2001), Yoko Ono, his cousin Clams Casino (Locomotor, 2014) and the Beastie Boys.Stephen Petronio Company Repertory

He regularly collaborates with visual artists, including Robert Longo (American Landscapes, 2019)Cindy Sherman (The Island of Misfit Toys and The King is Dead, 1994 and I Drink The Air Before Me , 2009), Anish Kapoor (Strange Attractors II), Donald Baechler (Extravenous and A Mid-Summer Night’s Dream, 1997), Stephen Hannock (Not Garden, 1999), and Charles Atlas (Wrong Wrong, 1990), as well as fashion designers Benjamin Cho, Rachel Roy, Tara Subkoff/Imitation of Christ, Leigh Bowery, Tanya Sarne/Ghost, Paul Compitus, Michael Angel, Tony Cohen, Adam Kimmel, Jillian Lewis, and Manolo.

Stephen Petronio Company's resident lighting designer and long-time collaborator is Ken Tabachnick.

Petronio has been commissioned to create new works for numerous companies, including National Dance Company Wales, Ballet de Lorraine, William Forsythe's Ballett Frankfurt (1987), the Tulsa Opera (1990), the Deutsche Opera Berlin (1992), the Lyon Opera Ballet (1994), the Maggio Danza Florence (1996), and the Ricochet Dance Company of London (1998)

Stephen Petronio received a 1999 Foundation for Contemporary Arts Grants to Artists Award. Petronio received a Guggenheim Fellowship in 1988, fellowships from the New York Foundation for the Arts in 1985 and 2004, the first of the American Choreographer Awards in 1987, and a New York Dance & Performance Award (Bessie) in 1986. He has been awarded choreography fellowships from the NEA from 1985 to 1988, and company grants from the NEA, like the Advancement Program Grant in 1994. He also received the New York State Council on the Arts consecutively since 1988. In 2007 Petronio was inducted into the Nutley, New Jersey Hall of Fame.
