= Joseph Langland =

American poet (1917–2007)

- Born: February 16, 1917; Spring Grove, Minnesota, U.S.
- Died: April 9, 2007 (aged 90); New Rochelle, New York, U.S.
- Education: University of Iowa
- Occupation: Poet
- Spouse: Judith Gail Wood (m. 1943)
- Children: 3

Joseph Langland (February 16, 1917 – April 9, 2007) was an American poet.

== Life ==
Born in Spring Grove, Minnesota, Langland was raised in Northeastern Iowa on the family farm. Langland received both a bachelor's degree (1940) and a master's degree (1941) from the University of Iowa. He served in the U.S. Army as an infantryman during World War II. His first collection of poems For Harold (1945) was written for his younger brother who was killed in action in the Philippines.

After the war, Langland taught part-time at the University of Iowa and then joined the faculty of University of Wyoming, teaching there from 1948 to 1959. He then moved to the University of Massachusetts Amherst, where he founded the MFA Program for Poets & Writers. He was a faculty member at UMass from 1959 to 1979 and a professor emeritus from 1979 until his death in 2007.

His work appeared in Massachusetts Review, Paris Review, The Nation, The New Yorker.

He married Judith Gail Wood on June 26, 1943. They had three children: Joseph Thomas Jr., (1946?); Elizabeth, (1948); and Paul (1951). He died April 9, 2007, at his home in New Rochelle, New York, at the age of 90. His papers are held at Luther College in Iowa.

== Works ==
- The Green Town (1956)
- The Wheel of Summer (1963)
- An Interview and Fourteen Poems (1973)
- The Sacrifice Poems. North American Review University of Northern Iowa. 1975. ISBN 978-0-915996-01-8.
- Any Body’s Song, Doubleday, 1980 (National Poetry Series)
- A Dream of Love (A poem with etchings), Pleiades Press (1986)
- Twelve Preludes and Postludes (1988)
- Selected Poems. University of Massachusetts Press. 1992. ISBN 978-0-87023-800-0.

=== Editor ===
- Joseph Langland; Tamás Aczél; Laszlo Tikos, eds. (1973). Poetry from the Russian underground: a bilingual anthology. Translated by Joseph Langland; Tamás Aczél; Laszlo Tikos. Harper & Row. ISBN 978-0-06-012501-1.
