= Diane Madden =

American choreographer

Diane Madden (born 1958) is a modern dancer, teacher, and choreographer based in Brussels, Belgium, and New York City.

== Education ==
Madden attended Hampshire College in Amherst.

== Career ==
Beginning in 1980, she worked with the Trisha Brown Company. She was rehearsal director from 1984 to 2000. From 1982 to 1987, Madden was a member of Channel Z, an improvisational performance ensemble. Other members of Channel Z included Daniel Lepkoff, Robin Feld, Randy Warschaw, Paul Langland, Nina Martin, and Stephen Petronio.

Madden has received several awards, including two from the Princess Grace Foundation and a Bessie Award.

== Personal life ==
Madden married James Dawson in 1997.
