= Paul Langland =

American choreographer (born 1951)

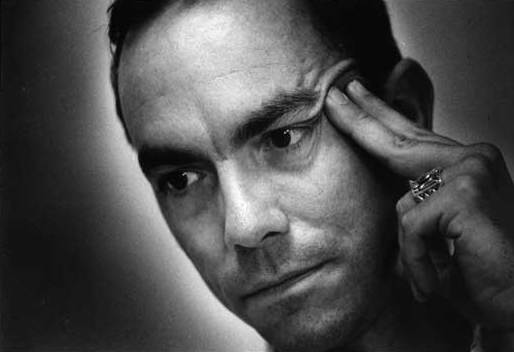
Paul Langland (photo by Johan Daveus)

Paul Langland (born February 6, 1951) is an American dancer, singer, choreographer and Arts Professor at New York University.

== Career ==
Langland's professional career began in 1972. In his work as a dancer and choreographer he has spanned many disciplines, among them the creation and development of "Allan Wayne Work" a dance technique named after his mentor. Langland is a longtime practitioner and teacher of contact improvisation. He was also a member of the Meredith Monk ensemble.

In December 1984, Langland choreographed and performed Circa 1950–51, along choreographer Le Schaetzel at Bessie Schönberg Theatre. In October 1989, Langland performed in the same theatre's Nuts (Homage to Freud).

In 1990, Langland perform in Sharon Wyrrick's Full Circle Company at the Kennedy Center Terrace Theater. Langland has also performed with Steve Paxton, Mary Overlie, Barbara Dilley, Ping Chong, David Gordon, Simone Forti, Andrea Klein and Channel Z. Other members of Channel Z included Daniel Lepkoff, Diane Madden, Robin Feld, Randy Warschaw, Stephen Petronio, and Nina Martin. His many choreographic works include "Almost Rapture" co-choreographed with Brendan McCall, which was a North America Division Finalist for Choreography in the 1998 Sixth Recontres Internationales Choreographique de Seine-Saint-Denis.

=== Teaching ===
Langland has been a professor at New York University Tisch School of the Arts since 1983. He teaches movement to students at the Experimental Theatre Wing, and was promoted to the position of Arts Professor in 2012. In addition to NYU, Langland has taught at University of Michigan, Amherst College and the International Theatre Workshop, amongst others. In recognition of his significant service to arts education, Langland was awarded the prestigious Brooklyn Arts Exchange (BAX) Arts Educator Award in 2014.

In 2009, New York University's Fales Library for Special Collections created The Paul Langland Papers, an archive to house Langland's extensive performance memorabilia from the 1920s through to the present day.

== Personal life ==
Langland is the son of poet Joseph Langland. He is married to painter Colin Cochran. They live between New York and Santa Fe.
