= Inubaka =

Japanese manga series

- Inubaka: Crazy for Dogs
- First tankōbon volume cover, featuring Suguri Miyauchi and her dog Lupin

いぬばか (Inubaka)
- Genre: Comedy
- Manga
- Written by: Yukiya Sakuragi
- Published by: Shueisha
- English publisher: NA: Viz Media
- Magazine: Weekly Young Jump (2004–2009); Monthly Young Jump (2009–2010)
- Original run: September 22, 2004 – April 28, 2010
- Volumes: 22
- Live-action film
- Directed by: Jun Yoriko
- Written by: Norie Yamada
- Music by: Edison
- Released: November 21, 2009
- Runtime: 92 minutes
- icon

Inubaka: Crazy for Dogs (いぬばか, Inubaka; lit. 'Dog Idiot') is a Japanese manga series written and illustrated by Yukiya Sakuragi. It started in Shueisha's seinen manga magazine Weekly Young Jump in September 2004, and was later transferred to Monthly Young Jump in August 2009, where it ended in April 2010. Its chapters were collected in 22 tankōbon volumes. The series was licensed in North America by Viz Media, who published 17 volumes from 2007 to 2010, before ceasing its publication. A live-action film adaptation premiered in November 2009.

== Plot ==
Sheltered and controlled by her parents for most of her life, and owner of a loyal mutt named Lupin, 18-year-old Suguri wants to move from the country-side to the big city, Tokyo, to find a career and a new life. After being kidnapped and stranded at a rest area, Lupin mates with another dog while her owner, Teppei, is not looking, shattering the latter's dream of a litter of purebred puppies. To make up for her mongrel's wayward wooing, Suguri accepts Teppei's offer to work at the pet store he manages—leading her to numerous adventures and canine antics.

== Characters ==
=== Main characters ===
Suguri Miyauchi (宮内すぐり, Miyauchi Suguri)
Portrayed by: Suzanne
Suguri is an 18-year-old dog lover known for her innocent and clumsy demeanor. Her closest companion is her mutt, Lupin, whom she views as her alter ego. As a child, she was kidnapped but later rescued by Lupin's grandfather, an event that led to her sheltered upbringing. Despite this, she shares a deep connection with dogs, intuitively understanding their needs. She works part-time at Woofles Pet Shop and develops feelings for her boss, Teppei, often displaying possessive jealousy. Coming from a wealthy family, she plans to breed Lupin, but her research into his lineage uncovers disturbing ties to her past, including a connection between her kidnapper and Lupin's family.
Teppei Iida (飯田哲平, Iida Teppei)
Portrayed by: Hidenori Tokuyama
Teppei runs a pet shop, Woofles, and resides in the apartment above it. Growing up, he frequently took in stray dogs despite his single mother's financial struggles. Though outwardly aloof, he shows deep care for both animals and people, often letting friends stay and work at his shop until they stabilize their lives. A skilled groomer with expertise in canine nutrition and breed history, he prioritizes finding dogs suitable homes over maximizing profits. His own companion is Noa, a black Labrador Retriever. He hires Suguri after recognizing her natural affinity with dogs, though her naivety sometimes tests his patience. While cautious about mixed breeds due to potential health risks and irresponsible ownership, he also eventually agrees to sell a half-Dachshund, half-Chihuahua puppy after vetting the buyer's suitability.
Kentaro Osada (長田健太郎, Osada Kentarō)
Portrayed by: Ryōsuke Okada
Kentaro, a high school friend of Teppei, is an amateur street musician who plays the guitar. After finding him homeless and unemployed, Teppei employs him at Woofles and allows him to stay in the rooftop kennels' doghouse. Initially disliking dogs, Kentaro eventually warms to them, even befriending Lupin—sharing beer with him and writing songs about him. Struggling with a pachinko gambling addiction, he once stole money from Suguri and lost it all. He harbors unrequited feelings for Kanako-sensei but fails to gain her notice. His younger sister, Mika, a junior high school student, shares his newfound appreciation of dogs.
Momoko Takeuchi (竹内桃子, Takeuchi Momoko)
Momoko is a licensed dog groomer hired by Teppei to handle the growing clientele at Woofles. As a child, she faced bullying on the subject of her weight, with only a boy named Yuu showing her kindness. Inspired by this friendship, she adopts a more healthy lifestyle and later enters into a relationship with him. However, Yuu eventually proves manipulative—exploiting her financially while secretly seeing other girls. His emotional abuse leaves Momoko distant and reserved, finding solace only in grooming dogs. With Suguri's encouragement, she ends her toxic relationship and moves into the "Woofles Girls' Dorm", an apartment above the shop leased by Teppei, alongside her Toy Poodle, Mel. Though still introverted, she gradually opens up and begins to flourish in her new environment.

=== Recurring characters ===
Chizuru Sawamura (澤村ちづる, Sawamura Chizuru)
Portrayed by: Maki Aizawa
Chizuru, a smug and spoiled customer of Woofles, desires a Chihuahua after holding a puppy at the store and becomes demanding, irritating Suguri. Her senior golden retriever, Ricky, alerts Suguri to a Chihuahua's heart condition before passing away, prompting Chizuru to adopt the Chihuahua Melon. She becomes close friends with Suguri and takes a hostess job to cover Melon's medical expenses. Despite her caring side, Chizuru often exhibits bullying behavior towards others.
Kanako Mori (森 香奈子, Mori Kanako)
A piano teacher and a regular customer at Woofles. She adored her Pomeranian, Czerny, like a daughter, spoiling her with human food, aromatherapy, and even birthday parties. After Czerny's sudden death, Kanako spirals into denial and self-recrimination, shutting down her piano school and turning to alcohol and casual relationships. Kentaro intervenes, urging her to move on, and Kanako ultimately finds solace in memories of Czerny. She initially went to Tokyo for music college, but struggled to find students for her piano school until her adoption of Czerny, who brought her a four-leaf clover on their first walk. Kanako later adopts a piebald Dachshund after sensing Czerny's spirit guiding her.
Hiroshi Akiba (阿樹場博士, Akiba Hiroshi)
Portrayed by: Ken Maeda
A young otaku, introduced by Suguri to the unconditional love dogs have for people. He purchases a French Bulldog, Zidane, and becomes passionate about dog breeds. He works as a government employee. He had a crush on Chizuru, however this crush quickly ended because of her disrespect for him. He puts Zidane on a strict diet due to weight gain and leads "Doga" classes. Living with his parents, he dreams of taking Zidane to Paris and making him a show dog. His last name references Akihabara's otaku culture.
Show Kaneko (SHOW・金子, Shō Kaneko)
Teppei's superior, and owner of Woofles chain. Show Kaneko prioritizes business over dog welfare, but genuinely loves dogs, and advocates against dog mistreatment. He treats Teppei as a little brother to be teased, and owns an Afghan Hound named Alfred. Show recognizes Suguri's bond with dogs after she impresses Alfred, who labels her "interesting." Nervous about competition from Wan Kan pet shop, he often tries to impress by displaying large dogs, like Standard Poodles or Borzois). Show coaches Suguri for a Dog Dancing Competition, revealing support for his staff's success and well-being despite an outwardly pragmatic approach to business.
Mari Yamashita (山下 マリ, Yamashita Mari)
A supermodel, known as "Yamarin" by fans and colleagues. She starred in a commercial with a Papillon from Show's store, later replaced due to drooping ears, this replacement causing her a deep depression in the aftermath of her Cocker Spaniel's death. Inspired by Suguri's care for the papillon, Yamarin buys it and names it "Lucky", forming a strong bond. Lucky becomes moral support to Yamarin in a stressful time, and Yamarin comes to deeply value his instincts, even allowing him to select the magazine for a bikini shoot. Despite Lucky's demands on her attention, Yamarin supports Kannako in coping with her grief after Czerny's death.
Kim Hyung-Joong (キム・ヒョンジュン, Kimu Hyon Jun)
Kentaro's South Korean friend and exchange student. He initially fears dogs due to their cultural association with food and a past encounter with an aggressive stray. He develops a crush on Suguri and adopts a Shiba Inu puppy named Chanta to overcome his fear. In surmounting his initial difficulties, Kim becomes a dedicated owner, but struggles to discipline Chanta due to his overwhelming love. Chanta's presence makes Kim popular among female pet owners, and he creates a photo book featuring Suguri alongside Chanta.

=== Dogs ===
Lupin (るぱん, Rupan)
Lupin is Suguri's beloved mixed-breed dog. His grandfather (whose collar Suguri wears around her neck) saved Suguri when she was kidnapped as a child. Suguri considers Lupin to be her alter ego and is unable to function without him near her. He has a knack for escaping his kennel to join her at the shop, annoying Teppei. Named after Lupin III, he shows an affinity for females and displays unusual understanding of commands, often submitting to dominant dogs. Suguri and Kim plan to breed Lupin with Chanta, hoping for predictable offspring given Chanta's pure Shiba Inu lineage. Lupin's lineage reveals a mix of German Shepherd, Kishu Inu, and other native Japanese breeds, explaining his Spitz-like appearance mistaken for a Kishu Inu by Ryusuke.
Noa (ノワ, Nowa)
Noa is Teppei's Labrador Retriever. She was intended to breed with a champion, but mated with Lupin instead, narrowly avoiding pregnancy. Well-behaved and maternal, she adopts a stray kitten and defends it from harm. Despite Teppei's reluctance, she remains sociable with Lupin and humans. Named after the French word for black, noir, she gives birth to seven puppies with a Golden Retriever named John, two of which are black like her, while the rest are golden like their father. Teppei relinquishes his desire to keep one of the black puppies when it's requested for service dog training.
Czerny (ツェルニー, Tsuerunī)
Czerny is Kanako's Pomeranian. She shares a telepathic bond with her owner, alerting her to a fire during Kanako's European work assignment. Spoiled and energetic, she bounces to express desires and showcases athleticism by catching a tennis ball and engaging in playful interactions with other characters. Czerny died due to kidney stone disease, but her spirit appears before Kanako, approving her decision to adopt a homeless dog, leaving with a smile.
Ricky (リッキー, Rikkī)
A senior Golden Retriever belonging to Chizuru that died of old age. He alerted to Suguri that Melon had a heart condition and in gratitude for Ricky's love, Chizuru adopted Melon as her own. His picture is worn on a collar around Melon's neck. Before he dies, he has a flashback of himself and Chizuru playing fetch when they very young.
Melon (めろん, Meron)
Chizuru's long-coated Chihuahua. He was given to her by Teppei due to a heart condition, which was successfully treated through surgery. Mischievous and attention-seeking, he once attacked Chizuru's purse for attention and "mounted" Chanta during training. Trained to obey Chizuru, he forms a close bond with Zidane. Despite being neutered later in the story, he exhibits territorial marking and dominant behaviors but no longer pursues female dogs in heat.
Zidane (ジダン, Jidane)
Akiba's rare French Bulldog. He is implanted with a chip for security. He aids in catching a pet store owner selling stolen dogs. Friendly and obedient, he gains weight from being fed human food by Akiba's parents. Zidane shares a close bond with Melon and conforms to Japan Kennel Club standards. Akiba aspires to make Zidane a show dog.
Rosetta (ロゼッタ, Rozetta)
Part of a litter of Papillon puppies whom Show split up to be sold between his and Teppei's stores. Show took Rosetta, saying he had huge hopes for her to be a show dog. Rosetta stars in a bread commercial with Yamashita. However, after the practice, one of Rosetta's ears droops, revealing that she is a Phalène, or a drop-eared Papillion. She is still owned by Show in a loving environment.
Lucky (ラッキー, Rakkī)
Part of a litter of Papillon puppies whom Show split up to be sold between his and Teppei's stores. He replaces his sibling in a commercial due to drooping ears. Trained by Yamashita and Suguri, he successfully completes the shoot. Show tries to buy Lucky as a mascot, but Yamashita adopts him instead. Lucky shares a close bond with Yamashita but demands all her attention for himself.
Chanta (チャンタ)
A Shiba Inu originally purchased by an elderly man who died shortly after. He is adopted by Kim and named after the tiles she mixed up during a game of mahjong that Kim was playing with Suguri. Chanta exhibits teething issues and survives electrocution thanks to Kim's quick thinking and Teppei's guidance. Affectionate and diverse, she adores Kim and is intended to be bred with Lupin to fulfill Kim's dream of seeing her happiest. Despite an incident with Melon, she is too young to bear puppies.
Alfred (アルフレッド, Arufureddo)
A pedigree Afghan Hound owned by Show. Alfred is characterized by his aloof demeanor and is trained to only obey commands by Show. Lupin finds him rather intimidating and will slink away if Alfred so much as looks at him. Alfred only obeys Show and Suguri.

== Media ==
=== Manga ===
Written and illustrated by Yukiya Sakuragi, Inubaka: Crazy for Dogs was first published in Shueisha's seinen manga magazine Weekly Young Jump on September 22, 2004. It was later transferred to Monthly Young Jump on August 18, 2009, where it ran until April 28, 2010. Shueisha collected its chapters into 22 tankōbon volumes, released from February 18, 2005, to May 19, 2010.

In North America, the manga was licensed for English release by Viz Media. 17 volumes were released from February 20, 2007, to November 9, 2010. In March 2011, Viz Media confirmed that they had put the manga on hiatus, finally canceling it.

==== Volumes ====
No.	Original release date	Original ISBN	English release date	English ISBN
1	February 18, 2005	978-4-08-876755-0	February 20, 2007	978-1-4215-1149-8
2	May 19, 2005	978-4-08-876795-6	April 17, 2007	978-1-4215-1150-4
3	August 19, 2005	978-4-08-876837-3	June 30, 2007	978-1-4215-1151-1
4	November 18, 2005	978-4-08-876879-3	August 21, 2007	978-1-4215-1152-8
5	February 17, 2006	978-4-08-877034-5	October 16, 2007	978-1-4215-1153-5
6	May 19, 2006	978-4-08-877078-9	December 18, 2007	978-1-4215-1162-7
7	August 18, 2006	978-4-08-877078-9	February 19, 2008	978-1-4215-1521-2
8	November 17, 2006	978-4-08-877127-4	April 15, 2008	978-1-4215-1783-4
9	February 19, 2007	978-4-08-877215-8	June 17, 2008	978-1-4215-1938-8
10	May 18, 2007	978-4-08-877257-8	August 19, 2008	978-1-4215-2009-4
11	August 17, 2007	978-4-08-877306-3	October 21, 2008	978-1-4215-2162-6
12	November 19, 2007	978-4-08-877347-6	April 21, 2009	978-1-4215-2591-4
13	February 19, 2008	978-4-08-877391-9	July 21, 2009	978-1-4215-2592-1
14	May 19, 2008	978-4-08-877438-1	October 20, 2009	978-1-4215-2667-6
15	August 19, 2008	978-4-08-877488-6	March 16, 2010	978-1-4215-2928-8
16	November 19, 2008	978-4-08-877541-8	July 13, 2010	978-1-4215-3167-0
17	February 19, 2009	978-4-08-877592-0	November 9, 2010	978-1-4215-3257-8
18	June 19, 2009	978-4-08-877640-8	—	—
19	August 19, 2009	978-4-08-877695-8	—	—
20	November 19, 2009	978-4-08-877736-8	—	—
21	February 19, 2010	978-4-08-877785-6	—	—
22	May 19, 2010	978-4-08-877852-5	—	—

=== Live-action film ===
A live-action film adaptation premiered on November 21, 2009.

== Reception ==
Carlo Santos praised the realistically drawn and very cute dogs, but was disappointed by the fanservice in the early chapters, and felt that the story relied on sentimentalism. AE Sparrow for IGN endorsed the first volume, but compared it to Old Yeller in its themes.
