= Matsuda =

Matsuda (written: 松田 lit. "pine ricefield") is a Japanese surname. Notable people with the surname include:

- Aoi Matsuda (松田 蒼; born 1996), Japanese badminton athlete
- Aoko Matsuda (松田青子, born 1979), Japanese writer and translator
- Eiji Matsuda (1894–1978), Mexican botanist
- Fujio Matsuda (1924–2020), president of the University of Hawaii
- Gaku Matsuda (松田 岳; born 1992), Japanese actor
- Genta Matsuda (松田 元太; born 1999), member of Travis Japan
- Haruko Matsuda (松田 治子; born 1972), Japanese badminton player
- Hideshi Matsuda (松田 秀士; born 1954), Japanese racing driver and television personality
- Hiroaki Matsuda (松田 亘哲; born 1997), Japanese baseball player
- Iwao Matsuda (松田 岩夫; 1937–2022), member of the Diet of Japan
- Iwao Matsuda (general) (松田 巌; 1895–1979), general in the Imperial Japanese Army
- Jeff Matsuda, animator for Jackie Chan Adventures and The Batman
- Jujiro Matsuda (松田 重次郎; 1875–1952), founder of Mazda Motor Corporation
- Kazuo Matsuda (松田 一夫; born 1941), Japanese ice hockey player
- Kiichi Matsuda (松田 喜一; 1887–1968), Japanese educator
- Leo Matsuda, Japanese-Brazilian-American animator
- Mari Matsuda (born 1956), American law school professor
- Mikio Matsuda (松田 幹郎; born 1949), Japanese ice hockey player
- Miyuki Matsuda (松田 美由紀; born 1961), Japanese actress
- Naoki Matsuda (松田 直樹; 1977–2011), Japanese footballer
- Natsuko Matsuda (松田 奈津子; born 1947), Japanese swimmer
- Nobuhiro Matsuda (松田 宣浩; born 1983), Japanese professional baseball player
- Rika Matsuda, survivor of Korean Air Flight 801
- Riki Matsuda (松田 力; born 1991), Japanese footballer
- Riku Matsuda (disambiguation), multiple people
- Ryuchi Matsuda (松田 隆智; 1938–2013), Japanese author and martial artist
- Ryuhei Matsuda (松田 龍平; born 1983), Japanese actor, Yusaku Matsuda's son
- Seiko Matsuda (松田 聖子; born 1962), Japanese pop singer
- Shino Matsuda (松田 紫野; born 2001), Japanese women's professional footballer
- Shota Matsuda (松田 翔太; born 1985), Japanese actor, Yusaku Matsuda's son
- So Matsuda (born 1991), Japanese Olympic mogulist
- Sorakichi Matsuda (松田 幸次郎; 1859–1891), professional wrestler
- Takafumi Matsuda (松田 隆文; born 1951), Japanese cyclist
- Takeshi Matsuda (松田 丈志; born 1984), Japanese swimmer
- Yasuko Matsuda (松田 靖子; born 1937), Japanese shot putter
- Yōji Matsuda (松田 洋治; born 1967), Japanese actor and voice actor
- Yura Matsuda (松田 悠良; born 1998), Japanese figure skater
- Yukio Matsuda (松田 征男; born 1942), Japanese rower
- Yūsaku Matsuda (松田 優作; 1949–1989), Japanese actor

== Fictional characters ==
- Takato Matsuda (Takato Matsuki), a character in the anime Digimon Tamers. (Matsuda is the character's name in the Japanese version)
- Touta Matsuda, a character in the manga and anime series Death Note.
- Takeyoshi Matsuda, a character in War and Destiny.
- Yasuke Matsuda, a character in the light novel Danganronpa/Zero
- Sean Matsuda, a character in Capcom's Street Fighter franchise.

== See also ==
- Mazda
