= Chūō, Kumamoto =

Town in Shimomashiki District, Kumamoto Prefecture, Japan

Chūō (中央町, Chūō-machi) was a town located in Shimomashiki District, Kumamoto Prefecture, Japan.

As of 2003, the town had an estimated population of 5,120 and the density of 122.75 persons per km^{2}. The total area was 41.71 km^{2}.

On November 1, 2004, Chūō, along with the town of Tomochi (also from Shimomashiki District), was merged to create the town of Misato and no longer exists as an independent municipality.
