= Tomochi, Kumamoto =

Dissolved municipality in Kumamoto prefecture, Japan

Tomochi (砥用町, Tomochi-machi) was a town located in Shimomashiki District, Kumamoto Prefecture, Japan.

In 2003, the town had an estimated population of 7,409 and a population density of 72.41 per square kilometre (187.5/sq mi). The total area was 102.32 square kilometres (39.51 sq mi).

On November 1, 2004, Tomochi, along with the town of Chūō (also in Shimomashiki District), was merged to create the town of Misato and no longer exists as an independent municipality.
