= Matsubase, Kumamoto =

Dissolved municipality in Kumamoto prefecture, Japan

Matsubase (松橋町, Matsubase-machi) was a town located in Shimomashiki District, Kumamoto Prefecture, Japan.

As of 2003, the town had an estimated population of 25,166 and the density of 659.66 persons per km^{2}. The total area was 38.15 km^{2}.

On January 15, 2005, Matsubase, along with the towns of Misumi and Shiranuhi (both from Uto District), and the towns of Ogawa and Toyono (all from Shimomashiki District), was merged to create the city of Uki and no longer exists as an independent municipality.
