= Ogawa, Kumamoto =

Dissolved municipality in Kumamoto prefecture, Japan

Ogawa (小川町, Ogawa-machi) was a town located in Shimomashiki District, Kumamoto Prefecture, Japan.

== Population ==
As of 2003, the town had an estimated population of 13,701 and the density of 328.64 persons per km^{2}. The total area was 41.69 km^{2}.

== Merge ==
On January 15, 2005, Ogawa, along with the towns of Misumi and Shiranuhi (both from Uto District), and the towns of Matsubase and Toyono (all from Shimomashiki District), was merged to create the city of Uki and no longer exists as an independent municipality.
