= Secret Life of Japan =

The Secret Life of Japan is a season of television programmes and films that was shown on Channel 4, in the United Kingdom, between Saturday 30 December 2000, and Tuesday 9 January 2001.

== Programmes and films ==
Title	Broadcast Date	Subject
Snow in Japan	2000-12-30	Jon Snow travels to Japan to examine whether the country can recover from the recession and overcome a debt of over £5 trillion. He also questions how drastic reforms, if needed, will affect the traditional way of Japanese life. He travels with journalist Mayu Kamide searching for some answers.
Teenage Japanese Killers	2000-12-30	This film examines the recent rise in violent crime in Japan. Through individual murder stories it provides an insight into 21st-century Japanese society.
Tokyo Bound: Bondage Mistresses of Tokyo	2000-12-30	This documentary follows Maxx Ginnane, an Australian film-maker, as she goes behind closed doors to meet Japanese mistresses at work.
The Dream of Garuda	2000-12-31	A convicted rapist, released from prison, pursues an obsession with his victim, seeking her in every woman he meets.
Travels Virtual Japan	2001-01-02	In this programme, Waldemar Januszczak looks at the latest in Japanese technological innovation and asks if Japan's past can explain its technological present.
Scenes by the Sea – The Life and Cinema of Takeshi 'Beat' Kitano	2001-01-02	Documentary about the actor, writer and director Takeshi 'Beat' Kitano. Uses interviews with Kitano and colleagues to paint a revealing portrait of his life and cinema.
Tokyo House	2001-01-03	The Parkinson family, from Wirral in Cheshire, go to live in a Japanese house in the suburbs of Tokyo for a month. They cook and eat Japanese food, work in Japanese jobs, entertain Japanese friends and try to be Japanese family.
Ah-So Graham Norton	2001-01-05	Graham Norton visits Tokyo where he is the houseguest of the Hoshi family. Graham experiences Tokyo nightlife, para-para discothèques, host bars and the unusual Japanese obsession with country and western line dancing.
The Bedroom	2001-01-06	A mysterious serial killer preys on the drugged prostitutes at a Japanese brothel.
Love from Bali	2001-01-06	This programme looks at the new wave of young Japanese people who are heading to Bali seeking pleasure and an escape from the cultural restrictions of Japan itself.
Tandem	2001-01-07	Drama in which two male commuters on the Japanese subway trade stories which blur the line between fantasy and the reality of their drab, everyday lives.
Suicide	2001-01-07	This programme looks at the story of Hideo Ebisawa, a devoted executive in a small electronics firm who committed suicide when his company was unable to pay the bills. It also looks at the recent phenomenal rise in Japan's suicide rate and examines the devastating consequences it has had on society.
