= Tomiai, Kumamoto =

Dissolved municipality in Kumamoto prefecture, Japan

Coordinates: 32°42′N 130°40′E

Tomiai (富合町, Tomiai-machi) was a town located in Shimomashiki District, Kumamoto Prefecture, Japan.

As of 2003, the town had an estimated population of 7,764 and the density of 396.32 persons per km^{2}. The total area was 19.59 km^{2}.

On October 6, 2008, Tomiai was merged into the expanded city of Kumamoto and no longer exists as an independent municipality. As of April 1, 2012, the area is part of the Minami-ku ward.
