= Kikuka, Kumamoto =

Town in Kamoto, Kumamoto, Japan

Kikuka (菊鹿町, Kikuka-machi) was a town located in Kamoto District, Kumamoto Prefecture, Japan.

As of 2003, the town had an estimated population of 7,402 and the density of 95.66 persons per km^{2}. The total area was 77.38 km^{2}.

On January 15, 2005, Kikuka, along with the towns of Kahoku, Kamoto and Kaō (all from Kamoto District), was merged into the expanded city of Yamaga and no longer exists as an independent municipality.
