= Kikuchi, Kumamoto =

Kikuchi 菊池市
- City
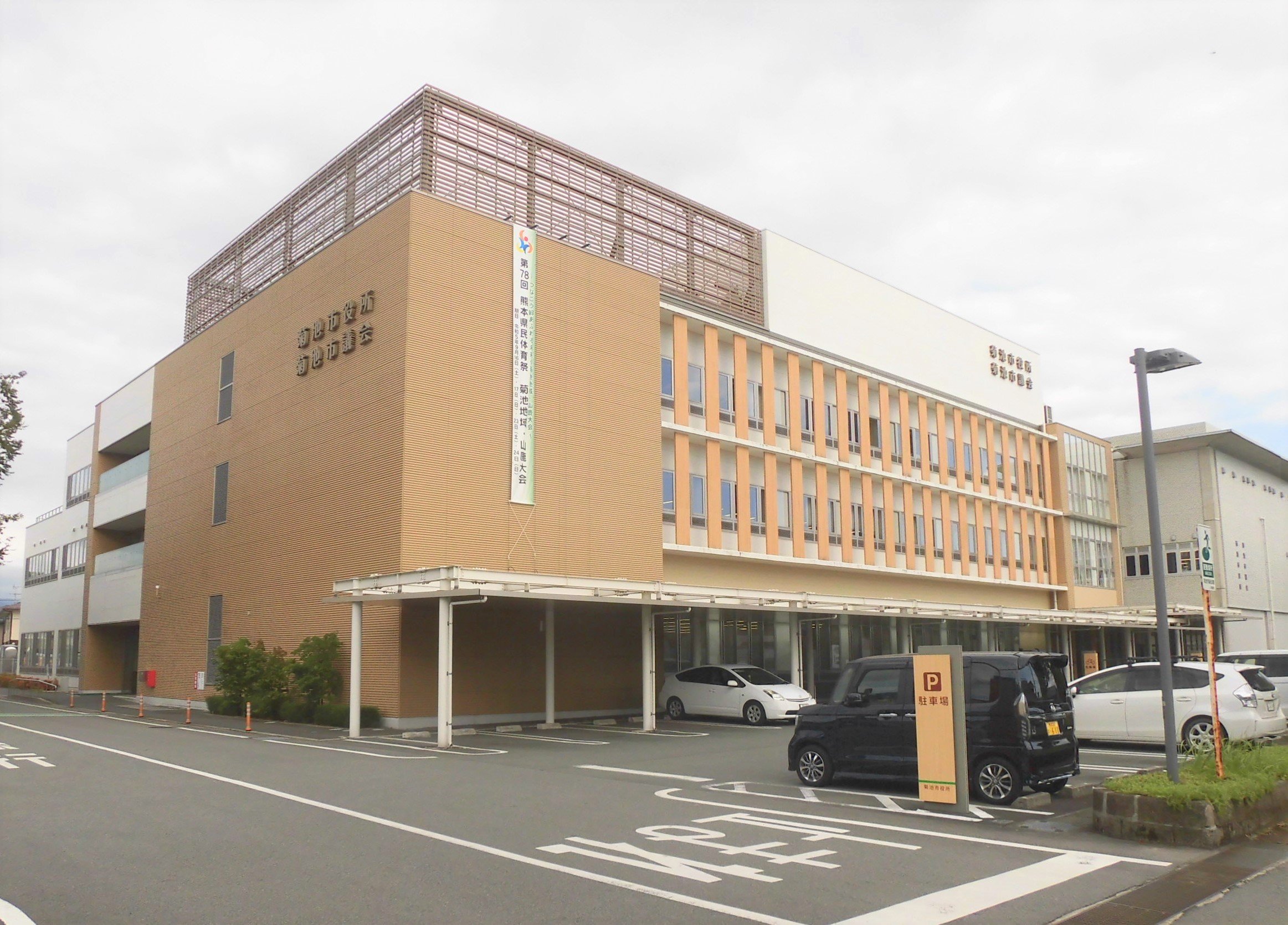
- Kikuchi City Hall

- Flag Emblem
- Interactive map of Kikuchi
- Location in Japan
- Coordinates: 32°58′46″N 130°48′48″E
- Country: Japan
- Region: Kyushu
- Prefecture: Kumamoto

Government
  - Mayor: Minoru Egashira (since April 2013)

Area
  - Total: 276.85 km^{2} (106.89 sq mi)

Population (June 30, 2024)
  - Total: 46,684
  - Density: 168.63/km^{2} (436.74/sq mi)
- Time zone: UTC+09:00 (JST)
- Climate: Cfa
- Website: Official website
- Symbols
- Bird: Japanese bush warbler
- Flower: Chrysanthemum morifolium
- Tree: Cherry blossom

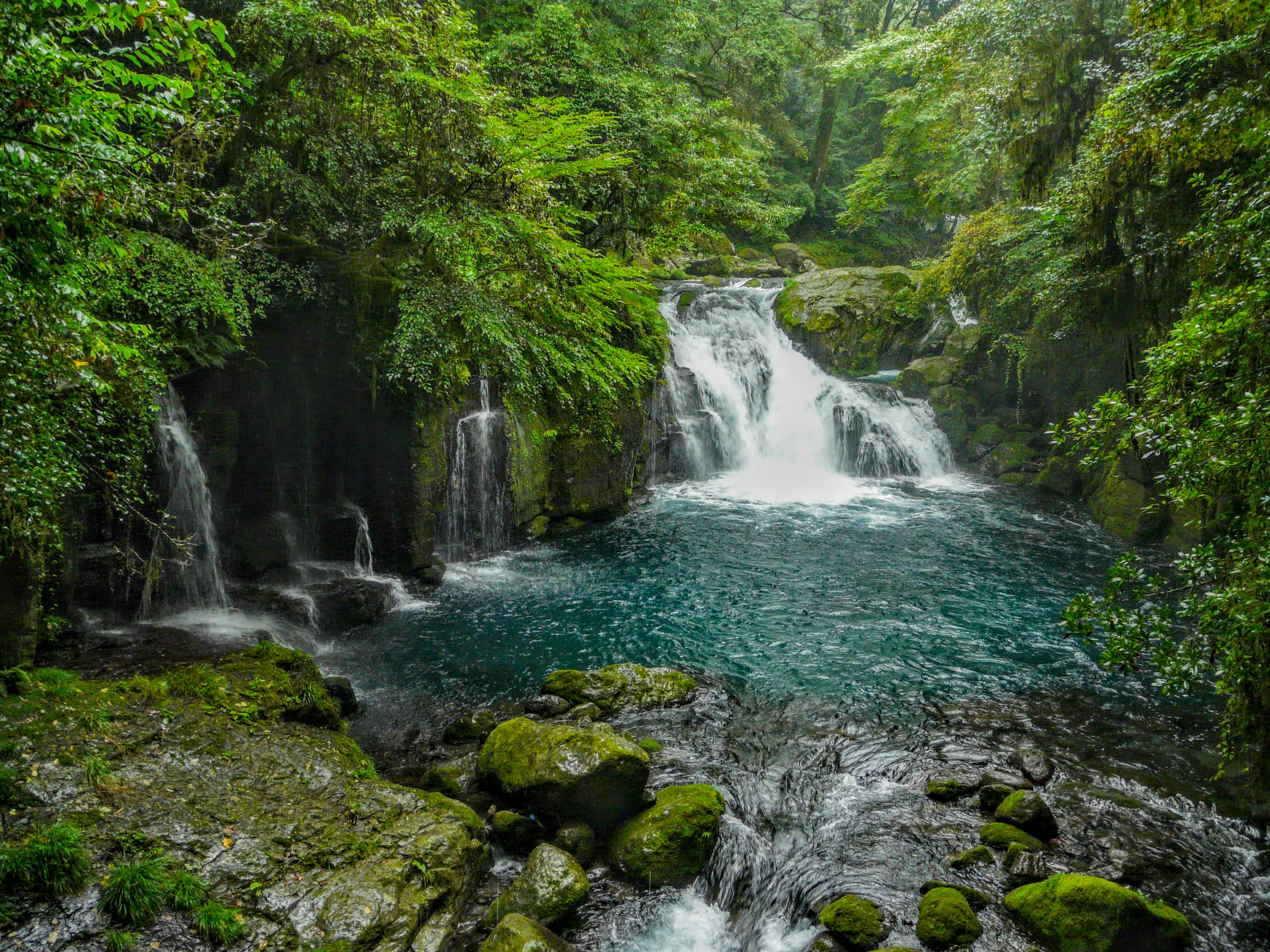
Tengu fall in the Kikuchi River

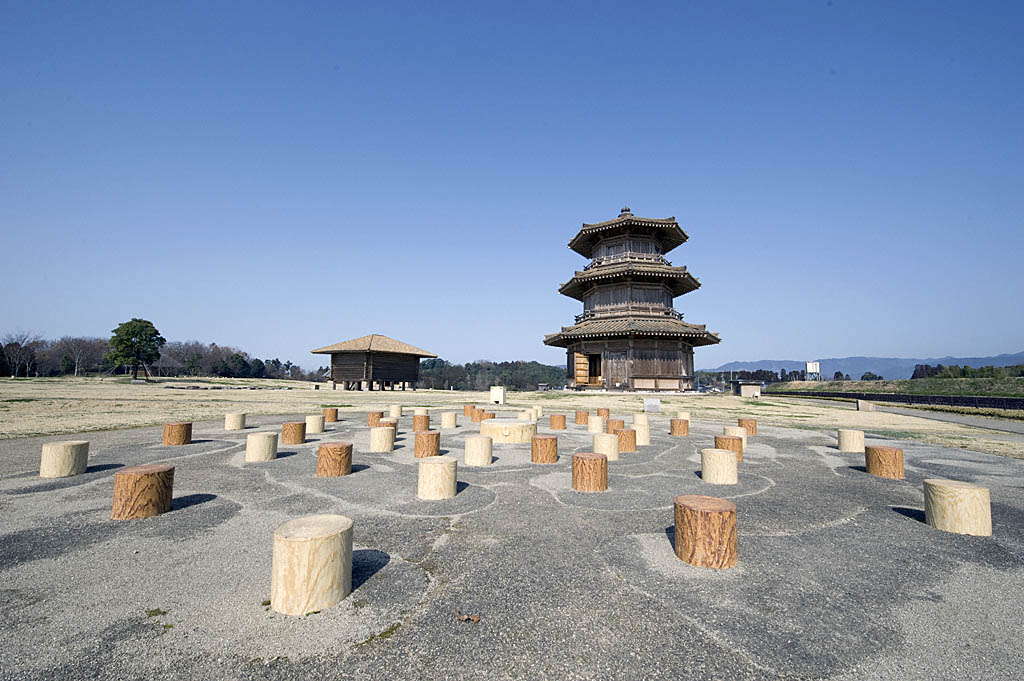
Kikuchi Castle ruins

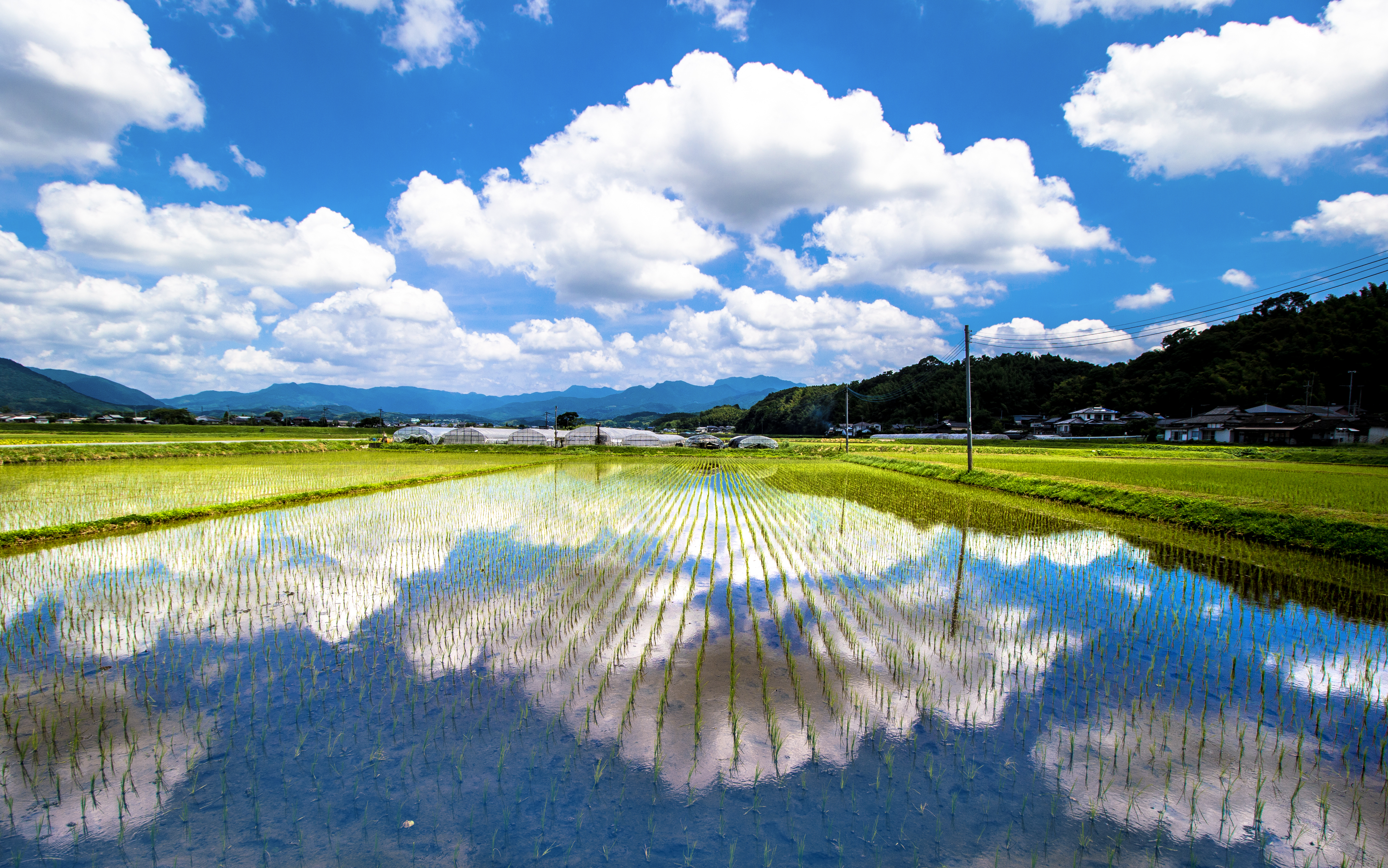
Rice fields in Kikuchi

Kikuchi (菊池市, Kikuchi-shi) is a city located in Kumamoto Prefecture on the island of Kyushu, Japan. As of 30 June 2024, the city had an estimated population of 46,684 in 20,392 households, and a population density of 170 persons per km^{2}. The total area of the city is 276.85 km^{2} (106.89 sq mi).

== Geography ==
Kikuchi is located about 25 kilometers northeast of Kumamoto City, upstream of the Kikuchi River that flows through the northern part of Kumamoto Prefecture, and the urban center in the southwest is at the northeastern edge of the Kumamoto Plain. The city is centered around Kumafu, the home base of the Kikuchi clan, which descended from the Dazaifu government officials. The eastern part is covered with natural broadleaf trees from the outer rim of Mount Aso.

=== Neighboring municipalities ===
Kumamoto Prefecture

- Aso
- Kōshi
- Kumamoto
- Ōzu
- Yamaga

Oita Prefecture

- Hita

=== Climate ===
Kikuchi has a humid subtropical climate (Köppen climate classification Cfa) with hot, humid summers and cool winters. There is significant precipitation throughout the year, especially during June and July. The average annual temperature in Kikuchi is 15.9 °C (60.6 °F). The average annual rainfall is 1,915.1 mm (75.40 in) with June as the wettest month. The temperatures are highest on average in August, at around 27.4 °C (81.3 °F), and lowest in January, at around 4.4 °C (39.9 °F). The highest temperature ever recorded in Kikuchi was 40.2 °C (104.4 °F) on 3 August 2026; the coldest temperature ever recorded was −9.9 °C (14.2 °F) on 27 February 1981.

Climate data for Kikuchi (1991−2020 normals, extremes 1977−present)
Month	Jan	Feb	Mar	Apr	May	Jun	Jul	Aug	Sep	Oct	Nov	Dec	Year
Record high °C (°F)	20.8 (69.4)	23.8 (74.8)	26.1 (79.0)	31.3 (88.3)	35.3 (95.5)	35.7 (96.3)	38.8 (101.8)	40.2 (104.4)	37.7 (99.9)	34.2 (93.6)	28.7 (83.7)	23.7 (74.7)	40.2 (104.4)
Mean daily maximum °C (°F)	10.2 (50.4)	12.0 (53.6)	15.7 (60.3)	21.0 (69.8)	25.8 (78.4)	28.0 (82.4)	31.4 (88.5)	32.9 (91.2)	29.7 (85.5)	24.6 (76.3)	18.4 (65.1)	12.4 (54.3)	21.8 (71.3)
Daily mean °C (°F)	4.4 (39.9)	6.0 (42.8)	9.5 (49.1)	14.6 (58.3)	19.5 (67.1)	23.0 (73.4)	26.6 (79.9)	27.4 (81.3)	23.9 (75.0)	18.0 (64.4)	11.9 (53.4)	6.4 (43.5)	15.9 (60.7)
Mean daily minimum °C (°F)	−1.0 (30.2)	0.1 (32.2)	3.4 (38.1)	8.2 (46.8)	13.5 (56.3)	18.7 (65.7)	22.9 (73.2)	23.2 (73.8)	19.2 (66.6)	12.2 (54.0)	6.1 (43.0)	0.7 (33.3)	10.6 (51.1)
Record low °C (°F)	−9.0 (15.8)	−9.9 (14.2)	−6.9 (19.6)	−3.4 (25.9)	1.8 (35.2)	7.0 (44.6)	14.3 (57.7)	15.1 (59.2)	5.1 (41.2)	−0.2 (31.6)	−3.9 (25.0)	−7.8 (18.0)	−9.9 (14.2)
Average precipitation mm (inches)	55.0 (2.17)	79.6 (3.13)	122.9 (4.84)	139.6 (5.50)	157.7 (6.21)	400.9 (15.78)	381.4 (15.02)	181.8 (7.16)	168.9 (6.65)	82.3 (3.24)	83.9 (3.30)	61.3 (2.41)	1,915.1 (75.40)
Average precipitation days (≥ 1.0 mm)	7.1	8.5	10.8	10.1	9.6	14.0	13.0	10.5	9.2	7.3	7.3	7.4	114.8
Mean monthly sunshine hours	133.3	139.9	163.8	178.9	182.9	111.9	162.2	197.4	170.1	181.2	150.4	138.2	1,918.8
Source: Japan Meteorological Agency

== Demographics ==
Per Japanese census data, the population of Kikuchi in 2020 is 46,416 people.

Historical population

Year	Pop.	±%
1960	58,767	—
1965	54,102	−7.9%
1970	50,211	−7.2%
1975	48,268	−3.9%
1980	49,527	+2.6%
1985	50,831	+2.6%
1990	51,610	+1.5%

Year	Pop.	±%
1995	52,545	+1.8%
2000	52,636	+0.2%
2005	51,862	−1.5%
2010	50,213	−3.2%
2015	48,167	−4.1%
2020	46,416	−3.6%

Kikuchi population statistics

== History ==
The area of Kikuchi was part of ancient Higo Province, and the location of Kikuchi Castle, an Asuka period mountain fortification. The local Kikuchi clan was a major supporter of the Southern Court during the Nanboku-cho period. During the Edo Period it was part of the holdings of Kumamoto Domain. After the Meiji restoration, the town of Kumafu and village of Kikuchi were established with the creation of the modern municipalities system on April 1, 1889. On September 1, 1956, the town of Kumafu and the villages of Kikuchi, Kawahara, Suigen, Ryumon, Hasama, Hanabusa, and Tozaki merged to form the town of Kikuchi. Kikuchi was raised to city status on August 1, 1958. On March 22, 2005, Kikuchi absorbed the towns of Shichijo and Shisui, and the village of Kyokushi (all from Kikuchi District).

== Government ==
Kikuchi has a mayor-council form of government with a directly elected mayor and a unicameral city council of 20 members. Kikuchi contributes one member to the Kumamoto Prefectural Assembly. In terms of national politics, the city is part of the Kumamoto 3rd district of the lower house of the Diet of Japan.

== Economy ==
Kikuchi has been a rice-producing area since the Edo period, and its brand rice has won first place in numerous national contests. In addition, melons, burdock, shiitake mushrooms, and other crops are cultivated, and livestock farming are also thriving and the city is the largest dairy farming area in western Japan. In terms of industry, the city has many automobile and electronics-related factories. Tourism, centered around its hot spring resorts has flourished since in the 1950s.

== Education ==
Kikuchi has ten public elementary schools and 5 public junior high schools operated by the city government and two public high schools operated by the Kumamoto Prefectural Board of Education. There is also one private high school.

== Transportation ==
=== Railways ===
Kikuchi has not had any passenger railway service since the reduction in services of the Kumamoto Electric Railway Kikuchi Line in 1986. The nearest train stations are Miyoshi Station or Higo-Ōzu Station.

=== Highways ===
- National Route 325
- National Route 387
- National Route 443

== Sister cities ==
Kikuchi is twinned with:

- Nishimera, Miyazaki, Japan
- Gimje, Jeollabuk-do, South Korea, since 1985
- Sishui County, Shandong, China, since 1994
- Tōno, Iwate, Japan, since 1998
- Cheongwon County, Chungcheongbuk-do, South Korea, since 2005

== Notable people from Kikuchi ==
- Shigeru Chiba, actor

== Local attractions ==
- Kikuchi Shrine
