= Riku Matsuda =

Riku Matsuda may refer to:

- Riku Matsuda (footballer, born 1991), Japanese footballer
- Riku Matsuda (footballer, born 1999), Japanese footballer
