= Jōnan, Kumamoto =

Dissolved municipality in Kumamoto prefecture, Japan

Coordinates: 32°42′N 130°43′E

Location of Jōnan in Kumamoto Prefecture

Jōnan (城南町, Jōnan-machi) was a town located in Shimomashiki District, Kumamoto Prefecture, Japan.

As of 2003, the town had an estimated population of 19,885 and the density of 539.18 persons per km^{2}. The total area was 36.88 km^{2}.

On March 23, 2010, Jōnan, along with the town of Ueki (from Kamoto District), was merged into the expanded city of Kumamoto and no longer exists as an independent municipality. As of April 1, 2012, the area is part of the Minami-ku ward.

The town is the home of the Kumamoto Civil Astronomical Observatory and the namesake of asteroid 21254.
