= Kyokushi, Kumamoto =

Dissolved municipality in Kumamoto prefecture, Japan

Kyokushi (旭志村, Kyokushi-mura) was a village located in Kikuchi District, Kumamoto Prefecture, Japan.

As of 2003, the village had an estimated population of 5,267 and the population density of 113.05 persons per km^{2}. The total area was 46.59 km^{2}.

On March 22, 2005, Kyokushi, along with the towns of Shichijō and Shisui (all from Kikuchi District), was merged into the expanded city of Kikuchi and no longer exists as an independent municipality.
