= Samebito =

Japanese mythological sea creature

The Samebito or Kōjin (鮫人(さめびと) or 鮫人(こうじん); lit. "Shark Man") is a creature that appears in "The Gratitude of the Samebito", a short story by Lafcadio Hearn. It is described as a shark-like humanoid with inky black skin, emerald green eyes, a face like a demon's, and a beard like a dragon's.

== Mythology ==
In the story, a man named Tōtarō meets the Samebito one day on a bridge. Although frightening, the creature turns out to be a gentle being who, as punishment for a petty fault, has been expelled from the sea by his former employer Ryūjin. Tōtarō takes pity on the creature and allows it to live in a deep pond in his garden. Meanwhile, Tōtarō has been seeking a bride and eventually falls in love with a beautiful woman he sees at a female pilgrimage at Mii-dera. He becomes deathly sick with grief upon learning that her family requires a betrothal gift of ten thousand jewels for her hand in marriage. When the Samebito learns that his master is on his deathbed, he begins to cry tears of blood which become precious rubies when they hit the ground. Through the Samebito's tears, Tōtarō eventually wins the hand of the woman with whom he is infatuated. When he has finished weeping, the Samebito is also pardoned by the dragons, and the story ends happily.

Hearn notes that the name for this being is usually read as Kōjin. The kōjin are creatures thought to live in the South China Sea which resemble ningyo, are always weaving at their looms, and whose tears become jewels.

Hearn's story appears to have been based on another story called Kōjin by Kyokutei Bakin.
