= Misato, Kumamoto =

Misato 美里町
- Town
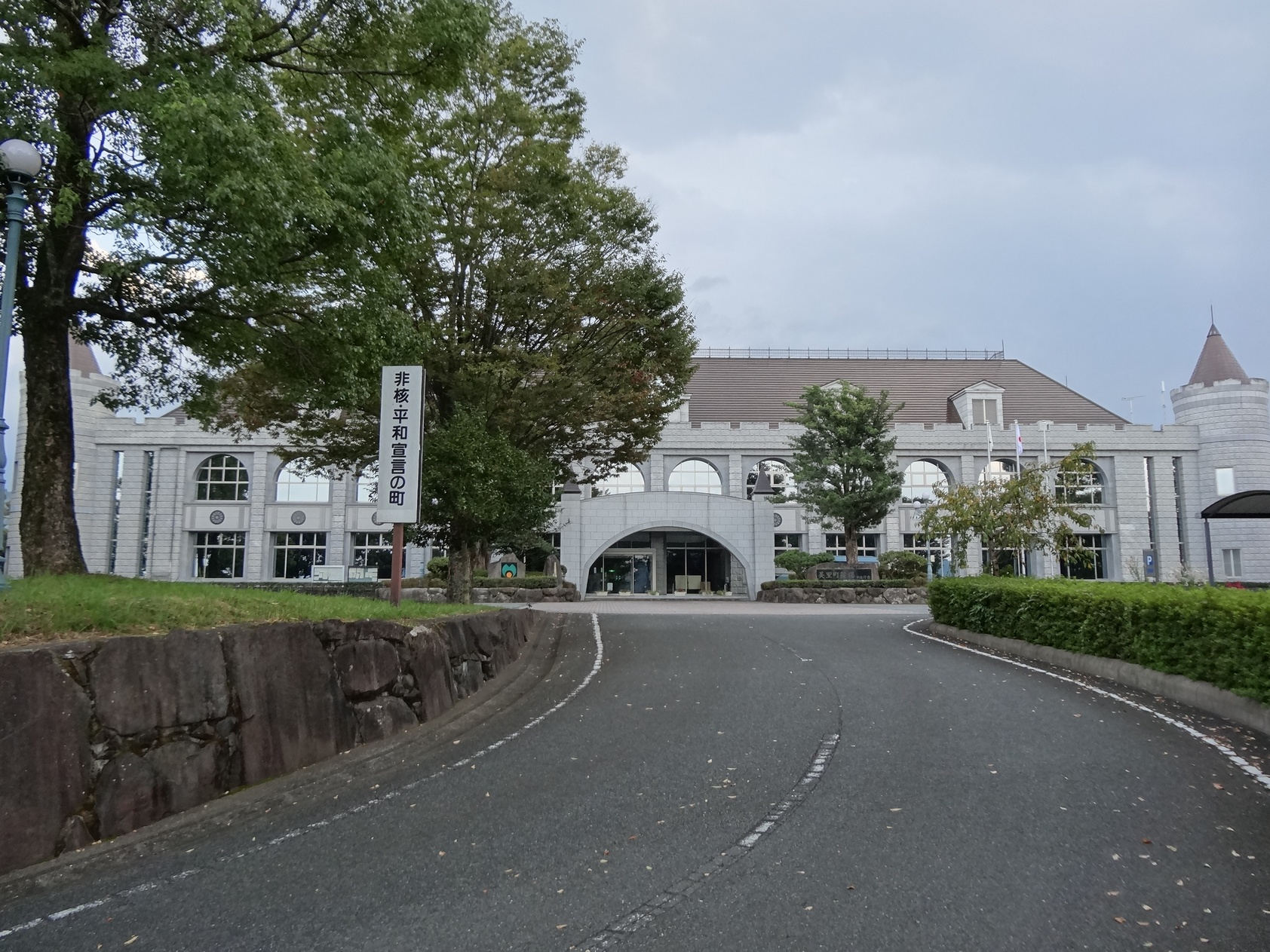
- Misato town Hall

- Flag Emblem
- Interactive map of Misato
- Location in Japan
- Coordinates: 32°38′22″N 130°47′20″E
- Country: Japan
- Region: Kyushu
- Prefecture: Kumamoto
- District: Shimomashiki

Area
  - Total: 144.00 km^{2} (55.60 sq mi)

Population (August 31, 2024)
  - Total: 8,361
  - Density: 58.06/km^{2} (150.4/sq mi)
- Time zone: UTC+09:00 (JST)
- City hall address: 1100 Baba, Misato-machi, Shimomashiki-gun, Kumamoto-ken 861-4492
- Website: Official website

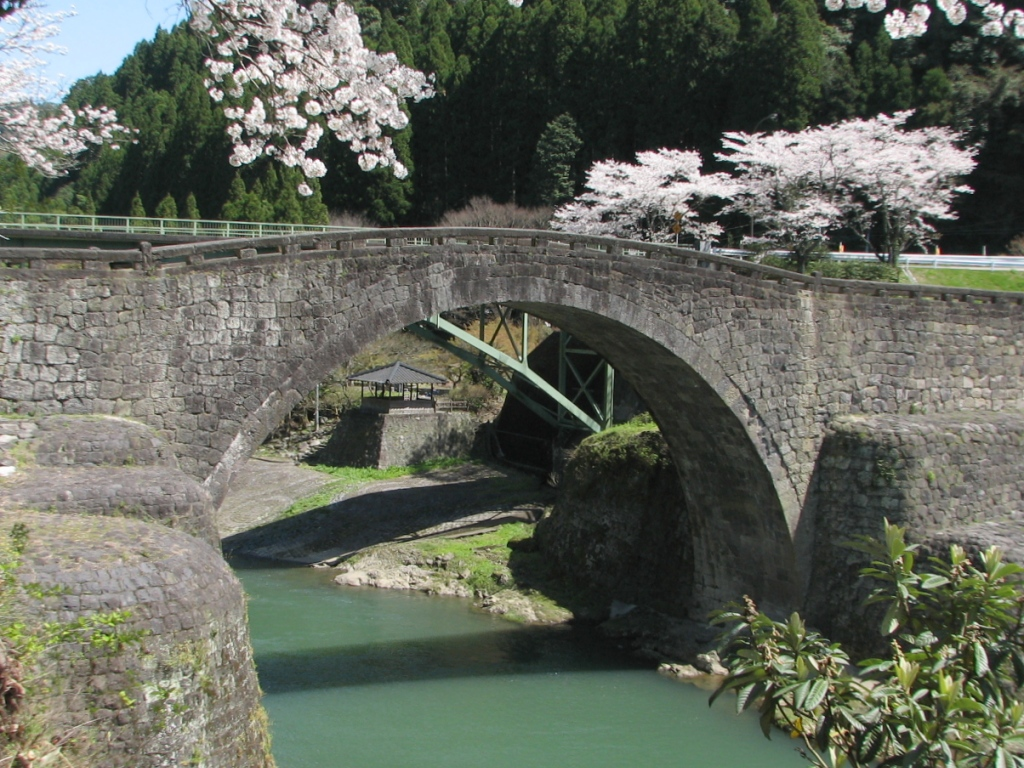
Reitai Bridge

Misato (美里町, Misato-machi) is a town located in Shimomashiki District, Kumamoto Prefecture, Japan. As of 31 August 2024, the town had an estimated population of 8,361 in 3323 households, and a population density of 58 persons per km^{2}. The total area of the town is 144.00 km^{2} (55.60 sq mi).

== Geography ==
Misato is located in the center of Kumamoto Prefecture, about 30 kilometers southeast of Kumamoto City. The urban center is in the northwest, where there is flat land at the southern end of the Kumamoto Basin, but nearly 80% of remaining area of the town is mountainous and forested. The southern part of the town occupies a corner of the Kyushu Mountains, with a series of mountains over 1000 meters high, such as Mt. Kosa, Mt. Karamata, and Mt. Kyojo. Rivers such as the Midorikawa River and the Shakain River flow through the town, and the Midorikawa Dam is located in the northeastern part of the town.

=== Neighboring municipalities ===
Kumamoto Prefecture

- Kōsa
- Mifune
- Uki
- Yamato
- Yatsushiro

=== Climate ===
Misato has a humid subtropical climate (Köppen Cfa) characterized by warm summers and cool winters with light to no snowfall. The average annual temperature in Misato is 13.2 °C. The average annual rainfall is 2333 mm with September as the wettest month. The temperatures are highest on average in August, at around 23.7 °C, and lowest in January, at around 2.1 °C.

=== Demographics ===
Per Japanese census data, the population of Misato is as shown below

Historical population
Year	Pop.	±%
1940	19,181	—
1950	24,288	+26.6%
1960	21,693	−10.7%
1970	16,579	−23.6%
1980	14,727	−11.2%
1990	14,222	−3.4%
2000	12,969	−8.8%
2010	11,388	−12.2%
2020	9,392	−17.5%

== History ==
The area of Misato was part of ancient Higo Province, During the Edo Period it was part of the holdings of Kumamoto Domain. After the Meiji restoration, the villages of Nakayama, Toshine, Nishitomochi and Higashitomochi were established with the creation of the modern municipalities system on April 1, 1889. Nishitomochi was raised to town status on April 1, 1924, and was renamed Tomochi. Nakayama and Toshine merged to form Chūō on January 1, 1955, which was raised to town status on September 1, 1975. On November 1, 2004 Chūō and Tomochi merged to form the town of Misato.

== Government ==
Misato has a mayor-council form of government with a directly elected mayor and a unicameral town council of 10 members. Misato, collectively with the city of Uki, contributes two members to the Kumamoto Prefectural Assembly. In terms of national politics, the town is part of the Kumamoto 4th district of the lower house of the Diet of Japan.

== Economy ==
Agriculture is the town's main economic activity.

== Education ==
Misato has four public elementary schools and two public junior high schools operated by the town government. The town does not have a high school.

== Transportation ==
=== Railways ===
Yamato does not have any passenger railway service. The nearest station is Matsubase Station on the JR Kyushu Kagoshima Main Line in neighboring Uki.

=== Highways ===
- National Route 218
- National Route 443
- National Route 445

== Local attractions ==
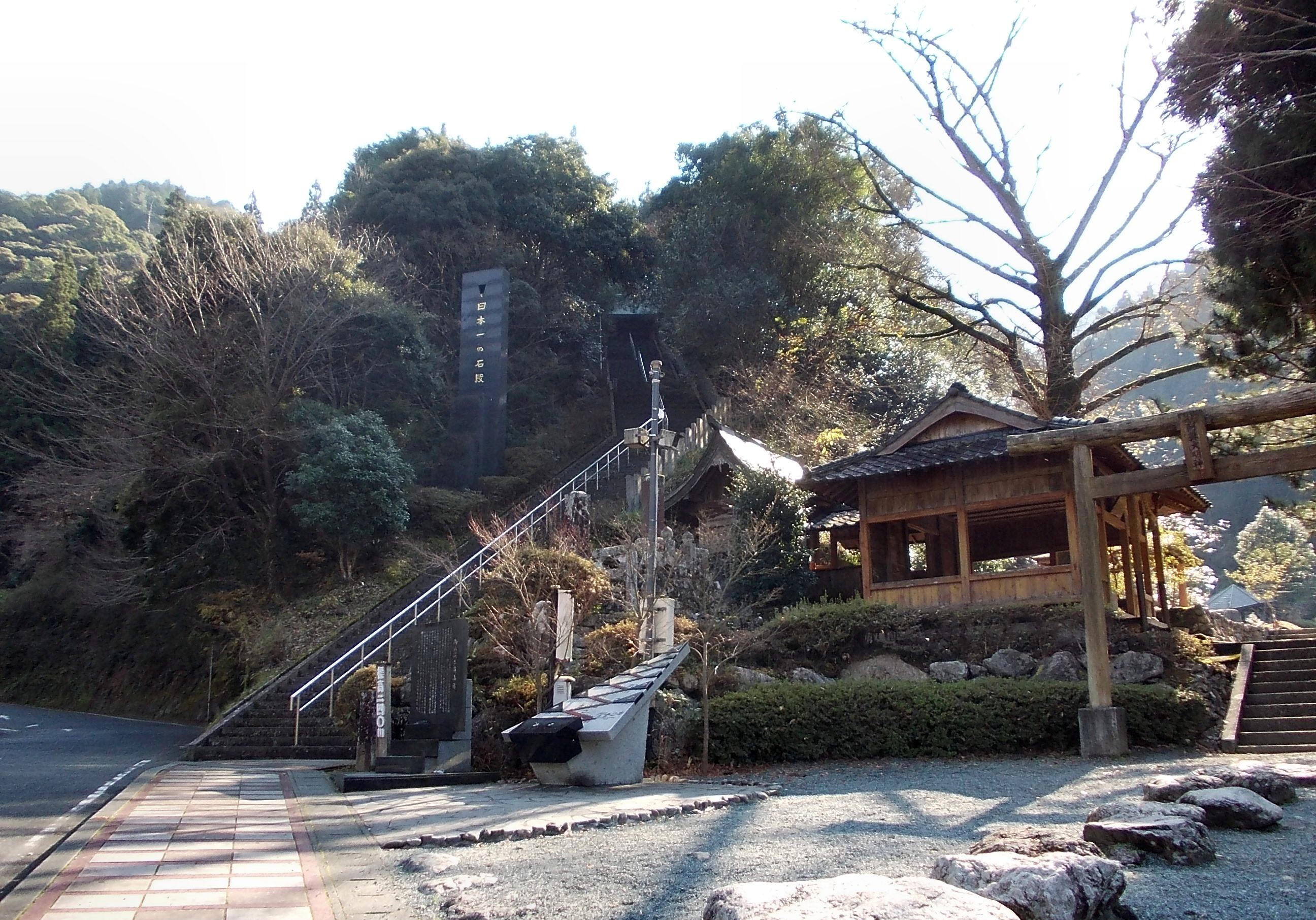
The "number one" stone stairway in Japan

- Misato is known for having the "number one" stone stairway in Japan (日本一の石段), with a total of 3,333 steps stretching over 2 km. Every November there is a festival in which challengers attempt to climb the steps within a certain amount of time.
