= Kiichi Matsuda =

Japanese educator of agriculture

- Born: December 1, 1887; Uki, Kumamoto, Japan
- Died: July 30, 1968 (aged 80)
- Occupation: Educator
- Known for: Education of practical farming to many farmers. Hirohito visited him at his farm in 1949

Kiichi Matsuda (松田 喜一, Matsuda Kiichi; December 1, 1887 – July 30, 1968) was a Japanese professor of agriculture who lived in Yatsushiro, Kumamoto, during the Taishō and Shōwa periods. Over 48 years, he taught farming techniques to 3,600 students at Matsuda Farm, his private school, and forty thousand people attended his lectures during that time.

== Early life ==
Kiichi Matsuda was born in Matsubase, now known as Uki, Kumamoto. After graduation from Kumamoto Farming School in 1905, he worked at the National Farming Experimental Station. He served as a volunteer soldier from 1907 to 1908. In 1911, he worked at Kumamoto Prefectural Farming Experimental Station, where he devised the Matsuda style of wheat culture, which was used in Kumamoto Prefecture.

== Nihon Nōyūkai ==
In 1918, Matsuda organized Nihon Nōyūkai (Japan Farmers' Association). Seven thousand people attended its inaugural meeting in Kumamoto. In the same year, he started a journal, Nō Yū (Friends of Farming). He left the Experimental Station in 1920 to start a farm in Kuroishibaru, now in Koshi, Kumamoto, but this area eventually proved poorly suited to farming. In 1925, he agreed to build a polder in Yatsushiro at the request of the governor of Kumamoto Prefecture. The following year, it was completed and named Showa Village.

== Matsuda Farm ==
The life of students at Matsuda Farm was extremely regimented, with morning ceremonies held at 5:00 AM. Kimigayo was sung, and the Flag of Japan raised every day. During the workday, the practice of agriculture continued even as meals, decried for a lack of taste and luxury, were served. Matsuda himself worked for 20 or more hours every day, and was a prolific writer who wrote fifty books. In the spring and autumn months, Matsuda made a series of lectures spanning three days, which were attended by thousands of individuals, at one point reaching 6,500 attendees.

== Later life ==
In 1928, he moved his farm in Kuroishibaru to the polder area of Yatsushiro. He was dispatched to Manchuria in 1932 to investigate its farming. In 1938, a new village was opened in Manchuria. In 1944, he was given the Blue Ribbon Medal for his devotion to agriculture. Emperor Hirohito visited his farm in June 1949, and Matsuda explained farming and products to him.

After World War II, Matsuda was investigated by American authorities, since he belonged to the Taisei Yokusankai in 1940, but he was not purged, because he presented food to the Christian women's high school, Yatsushiro Shirayuri Gakuen.

On July 30, 1968, Matsuda suddenly died during a lecture at age 80.

== Selected bibliography ==
- Ideal Farming (1928)
- Profitable Vegetables (1931)
- Lectures on the Soil and Fertilizers (1937)
- The Spirit and Techniques of Farming (1946)
- Increased Production of Rice and Wheat (1948)
- Epoch-Making Production of Wheat (1949,1950)
- Revolutionary Production of Sweet Potatoes (1953)
- Revolutionary Production of Rice (1956)
- Introduction to Breeding of Pigs (1958)
- The Relations Between Portugal and Japan (1965)
- Consciousness of Farmers in an Industrial Country (1968)
