= Kahoku, Kumamoto =

Dissolved municipality in Kamoto district, Kumamoto prefecture, Japan

Kahoku (鹿北町, Kahoku-machi) was a town located in Kamoto District, Kumamoto Prefecture, Japan.

As of 2003, the town had an estimated population of 5,065 and the density of 58.78 persons per km^{2}. The total area was 86.17 km^{2}.

On January 15, 2005, Kahoku, along with the towns of Kamoto, Kaō and Kikuka (all from Kamoto District), was merged into the expanded city of Yamaga and no longer exists as an independent municipality.
