= Kagami, Kumamoto =

Dissolved municipality in Kumamoto prefecture, Japan

Kagami (鏡町, Kagami-machi) was a town located in Yatsuhiro District, Kumamoto Prefecture, Japan.

As of 2003, the town had an estimated population of 15,738 and a density of 557.29 persons per km^{2}. The total area was 28.24 km^{2}.

On August 1, 2005, Kagami, along with the town of Senchō, and the villages of Izumi, Sakamoto and Tōyō (all from Yatsushiro District), was merged into the expanded city of Yatsushiro and no longer exists as an independent municipality.
