= Kamoto, Kumamoto =

Dissolved municipality in Kumamoto prefecture, Japan

Kamoto (鹿本町, Kamoto-machi) was a town located in Kamoto District, Kumamoto Prefecture, Japan.

As of 2003, the town had an estimated population of 8,617 and the density of 488.77 persons per km^{2}. The total area was 17.63 km^{2}.

On January 15, 2005, Kamoto, along with the towns of Kahoku, Kaō and Kikuka (all from Kamoto District), was merged into the expanded city of Yamaga and no longer exists as an independent municipality.
