= Izumi, Kumamoto =

Japanese village

Izumi 泉村
- Defunct village
- Interactive map of Izumi
- Country: Japan
- Prefecture: Kumamoto Prefecture
- District: Yatsushiro District, Kumamoto

Area
  - Total: 266.59 km^{2} (102.93 sq mi)

Population (2003)
  - Total: 2,692

Izumi (泉村, Izumi-mura) was a village located in Yatsuhiro District, Kumamoto Prefecture, Japan.

As of 2003, the village had an estimated population of 2,692 and a population density of 10.10 persons per km^{2}. The total area was 266.59 km^{2}.

On August 1, 2005, Izumi, along with the towns of Kagami and Senchō, and the villages of Sakamoto and Tōyō (all from Yatsushiro District), was merged into the expanded city of Yatsushiro and no longer exists as an independent municipality.
