= Shōe =

Shōe (証恵) (1516–1564) was a relative to Honganji Kennyo, and the administrator of Ganshō-ji. In the battle between Shōe and Oda Nobunaga, Shōe even sent out Nobunaga's brother Oda Nobuoki to take his own life. In the face of many fierce attacks, he finally accepted defeat and committed suicide.
