= Uto District, Kumamoto =

Former district in Kumamoto prefecture, Japan

Uto District (宇土郡, Uto-gun) was a district located in Kumamoto Prefecture, Japan.

As of 2003, the district had an estimated population of 19,496 and the density of 252.77 persons per square kilometer. The total area was 77.13 km^{2}.

== Former towns and villages ==
- Misumi
- Shiranuhi

== Merger ==
On January 15, 2005, the towns of Misumi and Shiranuhi merged with the towns of Matsubase, Ogawa and Toyono, all from Shimomashiki District, to form the new city of Uki. Uto District was dissolved as a result of this merger.
