= Kaō, Kumamoto =

Dissolved municipality in Kumamoto prefecture, Japan

Kaō (鹿央町, Kaō-machi) was a town located in Kamoto District, Kumamoto Prefecture, Japan.

As of 2003, the town had an estimated population of 5,099 and a density of 162.03 persons per km^{2}. The total area was 31.47 km^{2}.

On January 15, 2005, Kaō, along with the towns of Kahoku, Kamoto and Kikuka (all from Kamoto District), was merged into the expanded city of Yamaga and no longer exists as an independent municipality.
