= Ryuhoku, Kumamoto =

Dissolved municipality in Kumamoto prefecture, Japan

Ryūhoku (竜北町, Ryūhoku-machi) was a town located in Yatsushiro District, Kumamoto Prefecture, Japan.

== Population ==
As of 2003, the town had an estimated population of 8,430 and a density of 360.26 persons per km^{2}. The total area was 23.40 km^{2}.

== History ==
On October 1, 2005, Ryūhoku was merged with the town of Miyahara (also from Yatsushiro District) to create the town of Hikawa, as part of the "Great Heisei Merger" government initiative.

The hills in the east part of the town are home to several ancient Kofun tombs, of interest to archeologists studying that era.

== Economy ==
The town's output is mainly agricultural, with the major crops being nashi pears, strawberries, glutinous rice, and igusa straw for making tatami mats. Other minor crops include wheat, cabbages, tobacco, and various other vegetables and flowers. Cattle production is also increasing in popularity.
