= Tōyō, Kumamoto =

Dissolved municipality in Kumamoto prefecture, Japan

Tōyō (東陽村, Tōyō-son) was a village located in Yatsuhiro District, Kumamoto Prefecture, Japan.

As of 2003, the village had an estimated population of 2,787 and a population density of 43.17 persons per km^{2}. The total area was 64.56 km^{2}.

On August 1, 2005, Tōyō, along with the towns of Kagami and Senchō, and the villages of Izumi and Sakamoto (all from Yatsushiro District), was merged into the expanded city of Yatsushiro and no longer exists as an independent municipality. Tōyō is now officially referred to as Tōyō-machi (東陽町), or Tōyō town.

Tōyō is famous for its ginger, and every October the town holds its annual shōgamatsuri, or ginger festival. The town is also known for its old stone bridges, or ishibashi, of which many were built during the Meiji period. In addition, the town has one onsen named Seseragi.
