= Uki, Kumamoto =

Uki 宇城市
- City
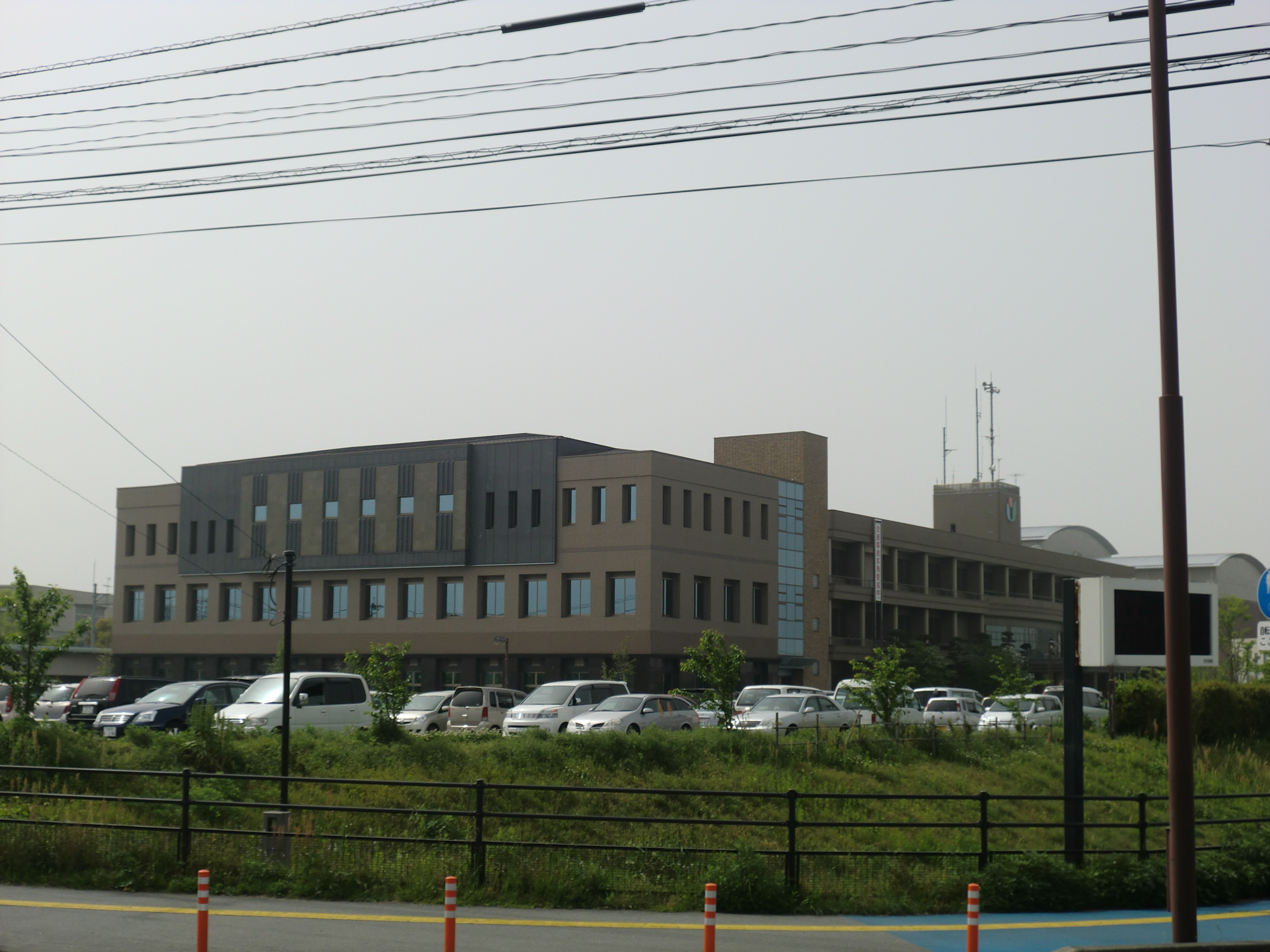
- Uki City Hall

- Flag Seal
- Location of Uki in Kumamoto Prefecture

- Location in Japan
- Coordinates: 32°38′52″N 130°41′03″E
- Country: Japan
- Region: Kyushu
- Prefecture: Kumamoto

Government
  - Mayor: Tetsuo Shinozaki (since February 2009)

Area
  - Total: 188.67 km^{2} (72.85 sq mi)

Population (September 1, 2024)
  - Total: 56,491
  - Density: 299.42/km^{2} (775.49/sq mi)
- Time zone: UTC+09:00 (JST)
- City hall address: 85 Matsubase Ono, Uki-shi, Kumamoto-ken 869-0531
- Climate: Cfa
- Website: Official website
- Symbols
- Bird: Cettia diphone
- Flower: Cosmos
- Tree: Cherry blossom

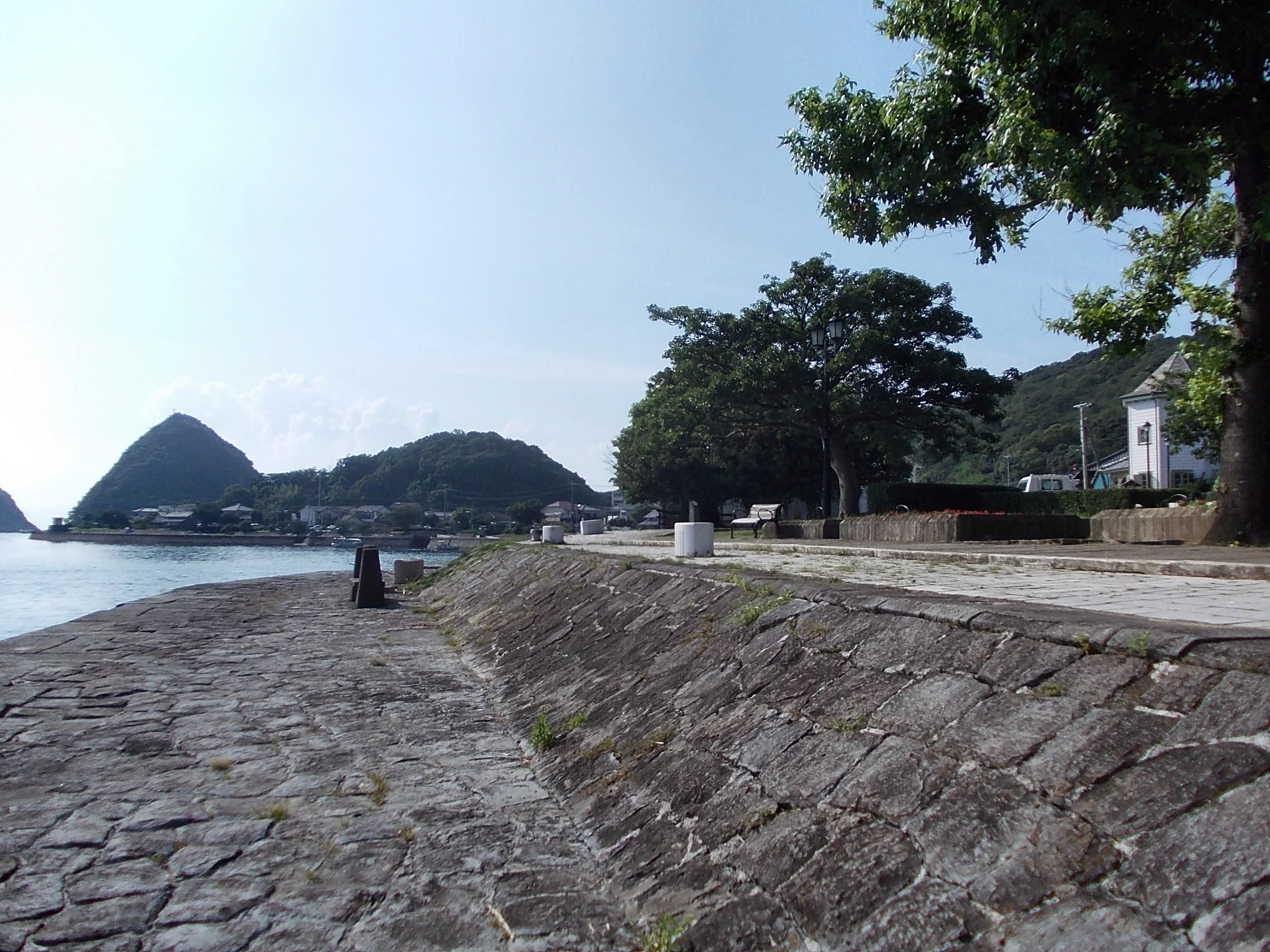
Misumi West Port

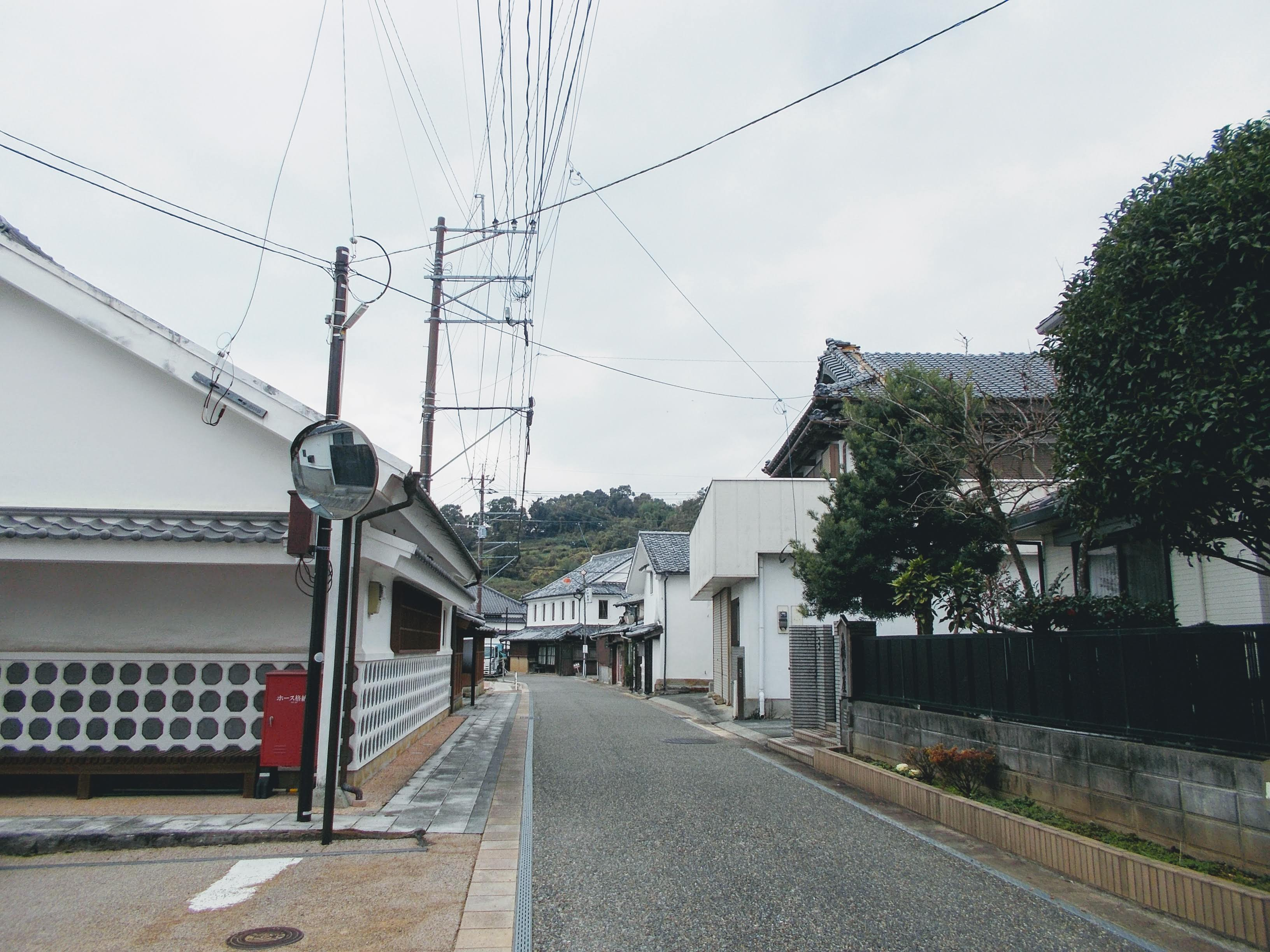
Street in Matsuae

Uki (宇城市, Uki-shi; Japanese pronunciation: [ɯ̈́.k̟ʲì, ɯ̈̀.k̟ʲi̥.ɕì]) is a city in Kumamoto Prefecture, Japan. As of 1 September 2024, the city had an estimated population of 56,491 in 25302 households, and a population density of 300 persons per km^{2}. The total area of the city is 188.67 km^{2} (72.85 sq mi).

== Geography ==
Uki occupies the southern half of the Uto Peninsula. It is located in the center of Kumamoto Prefecture, the city limits extend from the northern coast of the Yatsushiro Sea to the east inland, the south and west sides of the Uto Peninsula, and Tochijima Island, located south of the western tip of the peninsula. It is about 31.2 kilometers from east-to-west and 13.7 kilometers from north-to-south, and about 15 kilometers south of the center of Kumamoto City. The city consists of several urban concentrations, corresponding to the former municipalities with which it is comprised. The urban center is in the former Matsubase Town, and stretches over the former Ogawa Town to the south and the former Shiranui Town to the west, forming an entertainment district with general merchandise stores, restaurants, and entertainment districts. The former Toyono Town to the east and the former Mikata Town area on the west edge of the city are agricultural areas filled with greenery. Misumi Port, located in the former Misumi Town area, once flourished as the sea gateway to Kumamoto Prefecture and the starting point of the shipping route to the Amakusa Islands. Misumi West Port, built during the Meiji period, is counted as one of the "Three Great Ports of the Meiji Period" and is a component part of the UNESCO World Heritage Site Sites of Japan's Meiji Industrial Revolution: Iron and Steel, Shipbuilding and Coal Mining.

=== Neighboring municipalities ===
Kumamoto Prefecture

- Hikawa
- Kamiamakusa
- Kumamoto
- Misato
- Uto
- Tatsushiro

=== Climate ===
Uki has a humid subtropical climate (Köppen climate classification Cfa) with hot, humid summers and cool winters. There is significant precipitation throughout the year, especially during June and July. The average annual temperature in Uki is 17.1 °C (62.8 °F). The average annual rainfall is 1,869.2 mm (73.59 in) with June as the wettest month. The temperatures are highest on average in August, at around 27.8 °C (82.0 °F), and lowest in January, at around 6.8 °C (44.2 °F). The highest temperature ever recorded in Uki was 39.2 °C (102.6 °F) on 3 August 2026; the coldest temperature ever recorded was −4.6 °C (23.7 °F) on 25 January 2016.

Climate data for Misumi, Uki (1991−2020 normals, extremes 1977−present)
Month	Jan	Feb	Mar	Apr	May	Jun	Jul	Aug	Sep	Oct	Nov	Dec	Year
Record high °C (°F)	20.8 (69.4)	23.9 (75.0)	26.1 (79.0)	29.9 (85.8)	32.3 (90.1)	36.0 (96.8)	38.0 (100.4)	39.2 (102.6)	36.8 (98.2)	32.9 (91.2)	28.8 (83.8)	24.8 (76.6)	39.2 (102.6)
Mean daily maximum °C (°F)	10.3 (50.5)	11.7 (53.1)	15.1 (59.2)	20.4 (68.7)	24.9 (76.8)	27.1 (80.8)	31.1 (88.0)	32.6 (90.7)	28.9 (84.0)	23.8 (74.8)	18.1 (64.6)	12.6 (54.7)	21.4 (70.5)
Daily mean °C (°F)	6.8 (44.2)	7.7 (45.9)	10.8 (51.4)	15.4 (59.7)	19.7 (67.5)	22.9 (73.2)	26.7 (80.1)	27.8 (82.0)	24.6 (76.3)	19.7 (67.5)	14.2 (57.6)	8.9 (48.0)	17.1 (62.8)
Mean daily minimum °C (°F)	3.5 (38.3)	4.1 (39.4)	7.0 (44.6)	11.3 (52.3)	15.8 (60.4)	19.9 (67.8)	23.8 (74.8)	24.6 (76.3)	21.6 (70.9)	16.3 (61.3)	10.8 (51.4)	5.6 (42.1)	13.7 (56.6)
Record low °C (°F)	−4.6 (23.7)	−4.6 (23.7)	−2.7 (27.1)	2.5 (36.5)	8.2 (46.8)	13.6 (56.5)	17.7 (63.9)	19.3 (66.7)	12.3 (54.1)	6.0 (42.8)	1.8 (35.2)	−2.2 (28.0)	−4.6 (23.7)
Average precipitation mm (inches)	59.8 (2.35)	79.6 (3.13)	113.9 (4.48)	136.3 (5.37)	154.3 (6.07)	402.4 (15.84)	318.1 (12.52)	181.6 (7.15)	174.1 (6.85)	99.8 (3.93)	84.9 (3.34)	64.5 (2.54)	1,869.2 (73.59)
Average precipitation days (≥ 1.0 mm)	7.3	8.4	10.5	10.1	9.5	15.0	11.3	9.6	9.1	7.0	7.8	7.6	113.2
Mean monthly sunshine hours	127.8	141.8	169.9	180.6	193.1	126.0	192.5	221.1	182.0	187.8	151.3	138.1	2,012.1
Source: Japan Meteorological Agency

=== Demographics ===
Per Japanese census data, the population of Uki in 2020 is 57,032 people. Uki has been conducting censuses since 1950.

Historical population

Year	Pop.	±%
1950	76,123	—
1955	75,552	−0.8%
1960	71,168	−5.8%
1965	65,058	−8.6%
1970	61,766	−5.1%
1975	61,448	−0.5%
1980	62,412	+1.6%
1985	63,662	+2.0%

Year	Pop.	±%
1990	63,401	−0.4%
1995	64,008	+1.0%
2000	63,968	−0.1%
2005	63,089	−1.4%
2010	61,897	−1.9%
2015	59,756	−3.5%
2020	57,032	−4.6%

Uki population statistics

== History ==
The area of Uki was part of ancient Higo Province, During the Edo Period it was part of the holdings of Kumamoto Domain. After the Meiji restoration, the town of Matsubase was established with the creation of the modern municipalities system on April 1, 1889.

The city of Uki was established on January 15, 2005, as a result of the merger between the towns of Misumi and Shiranuhi (both from Uto District), and the towns of Matsubase, Ogawa and Toyono (all from Shimomashiki District).

=== Events ===
- 2016 Kumamoto earthquake
- 2026 Kumamoto earthquake

== Government ==
Uki has a mayor-council form of government with a directly elected mayor and a unicameral city council of 22 members. Uki, collectively with the town of Misato, contributes two members to the Kumamoto Prefectural Assembly. In terms of national politics, the city is part of the Kumamoto 4th district of the lower house of the Diet of Japan.

== Economy ==
Uki is a reguional commercial center, and has an economy based on agriculture, commercial fishing, food processing and light manufacturing.

== Education ==
Uki has 12 public elementary schools and five public junior high schools operated by the city government and two public high schools operated by the Kumamoto Prefectural Board of Education. The prefecture also operates three special education schools for the handicapped.

== Transportation ==
=== Railways ===
JR Kyushu - Kagoshima Main Line

■ - Matsubase - Ogawa

JR Kyushu - Misumi Line

■ - Ishiuchi Dam - Hataura - Misumi

=== Highways ===
- Kyushu Expressway
- National Route 3
- National Route 57
- National Route 218
- National Route 266

== Local attractions ==
- Ishiuchi Dam
- Odara Kofun, National Historic Site
- Shiranui - atmospheric optical phenomenon.
- Tofuku-ji - Takezaki Suenaga's (a samurai of Kamakura period) family temple. He was owner of Moko Shurai Ekotoba.

== Notable people from Uki ==
- Karina Maki, handball player
- Seiichiro Maki, football player
- Yuki Maki, football player
- Kiichi Matsuda, educator of agriculture
- Utshiharo Matsuura, dermatologist
- Tetsuya Noda, contemporary artist
- Haruki Uemura, former judo wrestler
