= Yatsushiro District, Kumamoto =

District in Kumamoto prefecture, Japan

Coordinates: 32°35′05″N 130°40′23″E

Location of Yatsushiro District in Kumamoto Prefecture

Yatsushiro (八代郡, Yatsushiro-gun) is a district located in Kumamoto Prefecture, Japan.

As of the Yatsushiro merger (but with 2003 population estimates), the district has an estimated population of 13,524 and a density of 406 persons per square kilometer. The total area is 33.29 km^{2}.

== Towns and villages ==
- Hikawa

== Mergers ==
See Merger and dissolution of municipalities of Japan.

- On August 1, 2005, the municipalities of Izumi, Kagami, Sakamoto, Senchō and Tōyō merged into the city of Yatsushiro.
- On October 1, 2005, the towns of Miyahara and Ryūhoku merged to form the new town of Hikawa.
