= Miyahara, Kumamoto =

Dissolved municipality in Kumamoto prefecture, Japan

Coordinates: 32.550°N 130.683°E

Miyahara (宮原町, Miyahara-machi) was a town located in Yatsushiro District, Kumamoto Prefecture, Japan.

As of 2003 the town had an estimated population of 5,094 and a density of 515.07 persons per km^{2}. The total area was 9.89 km^{2}.

On October 1, 2005, Miyahara, along with the town of Ryūhoku (also from Yatsushiro District), was merged to create the town of Hikawa, as part of the "Great Heisei Merger" government initiative.
