= Misumi, Kumamoto =

Dissolved municipality in Kumamoto prefecture, Japan

Coordinates: 32°36′43″N 130°28′17″E

Misumi (三角町, Misumi-machi) was a town located in Uto District, Kumamoto Prefecture, Japan.

As of 2003, the town had an estimated population of 9,840 and the density of 203.73 persons per km^{2}. The total area was 48.30 km^{2}.

On January 15, 2005, Misumi, along with the town of Shiranuhi (also from Uto District), and the towns of Matsubase, Ogawa and Toyono (all from Shimomashiki District), was merged to create the city of Uki and no longer exists, as an independent municipality.

== History ==
An Imperial Decree in July 1899 established Shimonoseki as an open port for trading with the United States and the United Kingdom.
