= Kamoto District, Kumamoto =

District of Kumamoto Prefecture, Japan

Coordinates: 32°48′N 130°42′E

Kamoto District (Japanese: 鹿本郡, Hepburn: Kamoto-gun) was a district located in Kumamoto Prefecture, Japan.

As of 2003, the district had an estimated population of 31,088 and the density of 472.39 persons per square kilometer. The total area was 65.81; km^{2}.

== Former towns and villages ==
- Kahoku
- Kamoto
- Kaō
- Kikuka
- Ueki

== Mergers ==
- On January 15, 2005 - the towns of Kahoku, Kamoto, Kaō and Kikuka were merged into the expanded city of Yamaga.
- On March 23, 2010 - the town of Ueki, along with the town of Jōnan (from Shimomashiki District), was merged into the expanded city of Kumamoto. Kamoto District was dissolved as a result of this merger.
