= Toyono, Kumamoto =

Dissolved municipality in Kumamoto prefecture, Japan

Toyono (豊野町, Toyono-machi) was a town located in Shimomashiki District, Kumamoto Prefecture, Japan.

As of 2003, the town had an estimated population of 4,925 and the density of 156.15 persons per km^{2}. The total area was 31.54 km^{2}.

On January 15, 2005, Toyono, along with the towns of Misumi and Shiranuhi (both from Uto District), and the towns of Matsubase and Ogawa (all from Shimomashiki District), was merged to create the city of Uki and no longer exists as an independent municipality.
