= Ueki, Kumamoto =

Dissolved municipality in Kumamoto prefecture, Japan

Coordinates: 32.900°N 130.683°E

Location of Ueki in Kumamoto Prefecture

Ueki (植木町, Ueki-machi) was a town located in Kamoto District, Kumamoto Prefecture, Japan.

On March 23, 2010, Ueki, along with the town of Jōnan (from Shimomashiki District), was merged into the expanded city of Kumamoto and no longer exists as an independent municipality. As of April 1, 2012, the area is part of the Kita-ku ward.

As of 2003, the town had an estimated population of 31,088 and a density of 472.39 persons/km² (293.59 persons/sq mi). The total area was 65.81 km^{2} (40.90 sq mi).

Ueki was famous for watermelons.
