= Uto Peninsula =

Peninsula in Kumamoto Prefecture, Japan

Coordinates: 32.65°N 130.55°E

Location of Uto Peninsula

The Uto Peninsula (Japanese: 宇土半島) is a peninsula in the central part of Kumamoto Prefecture in Japan. The length of the peninsula is about 18km.
