= Shichijo, Kumamoto =

Dissolved municipality in Kumamoto prefecture, Japan

Shichijō (七城町, Shichijō-machi) was a town located in Kikuchi District, Kumamoto Prefecture, Japan.

== Population ==
As of 2003, the town had an estimated population of 5,720 and a density of 279.02 persons per km^{2}. The total area was 20.50 km^{2}.

== History ==
On March 22, 2005, Shichijō, along with the town of Shisui, and the village of Kyokushi (all from Kikuchi District), was merged into the expanded city of Kikuchi and no longer exists as an independent municipality.

Shichijo means "Seven Castles" in Japanese. The town derived its name from the seven castles that surrounded the area. One of the most famous onsens in the Kumamoto-area, Kunakokujo, is constructed in the shape of castle.

== Economy ==
Shichijo is also home to award-winning rice and melons. In the center of town is the Melon Dome, which is a farmer's market located under a structure shaped like melons.
