= Sakamoto, Kumamoto =

Former village in Kumamoto Prefecture, Japan

Sakamoto 坂本村
- Former village
- Location in Japan
- Country: Japan
- Prefecture: Kumamoto
- District: Yatsuhiro

Area
  - Total: 162.82 km^{2} (62.87 sq mi)

Population (2003)
  - Total: 5,415
  - Density: 33.26/km^{2} (86.1/sq mi)

Sakamoto (坂本村, Sakamoto-mura) was a village located in Yatsuhiro District, Kumamoto Prefecture, Japan.

== Population ==
As of 2003, the village had an estimated population of 5,415 and a population density of 33.26 persons per km^{2}. The total area was 162.82 km^{2}.

== History ==
On August 1, 2005, Sakamoto, along with the towns of Kagami and Senchō, and the villages of Izumi and Tōyō (all from Yatsushiro District), was merged into the expanded city of Yatsushiro and no longer exists as an independent municipality.
