= Senchō, Kumamoto =

Dissolved municipality in Kumamoto prefecture, Japan

Senchō (千丁町, Senchō-machi) was a town located in Yatsushiro District, Kumamoto Prefecture, Japan.

== Population ==
As of 2003, the town had an estimated population of 6,838 and a density of 611.63 persons per km^{2}. The total area was 11.18 square kilometres (4.32 sq mi).

== History ==
On August 1, 2005, Senchō, along with the town of Kagami, and the villages of Izumi, Sakamoto and Tōyō (all from Yatsushiro District), was merged into the expanded city of Yatsushiro and no longer exists as an independent municipality.
