= Shisui, Kumamoto =

Dissolved municipality in Kumamoto prefecture, Japan

Shisui (泗水町, Shisui-machi) was a town located in Kikuchi District, Kumamoto Prefecture, Japan.

== Population ==
As of 2003, the town had an estimated population of 14,162 and a density of 525.10 persons per km^{2}. The total area was 26.97 km^{2}.

== History ==
On March 22, 2005, Shisui, along with the town of Shichijō, and the village of Kyokushi (all from Kikuchi District), was merged into the expanded city of Kikuchi and no longer exists as an independent municipality.
