= Shiranuhi, Kumamoto =

Dissolved municipality in Kumamoto prefecture, Japan

Shiranuhi (不知火町, Shiranuhi-machi) was a town located in Uto District, Kumamoto Prefecture, Japan.

== Population ==
As of 2003, the town had an estimated population of 9,656 and the density of 334.93 persons per km^{2}. The total area was 28.83 km^{2}.

== History ==
On January 15, 2005, Shiranuhi, along with the town of Misumi (also from Uto District), and the towns of Matsubase, Ogawa and Toyono (all from Shimomashiki District), was merged to create the city of Uki and no longer exists as an independent municipality.
