= Shimomashiki District, Kumamoto =

District in Kumamoto prefecture, Japan

Coordinates: 32.615°N 130.869°E

Location of Shimomashiki District in Kumamoto Prefecture

Shimomashiki (下益城郡, Shimomashiki-gun) is a district located in Kumamoto Prefecture, Japan.

== Population ==
Following the March 23, 2010 Kumamoto merger the district consists of the single town of Misato. After the merger, the district has an estimated population of 11,164 and a density of 77.5 persons per square kilometer. The total area is 144.03 km^{2}.

== Towns and villages ==
- Misato

== Mergers ==
See Merger and dissolution of municipalities of Japan.

- On November 1, 2004, the towns of Chūō and Tomochi merged to form the new town of Misato.
- On January 15, 2005, the towns of Matsubase, Ogawa and Toyono merged with the towns of Misumi and Shiranuhi from Uto District to form the new city of Uki.
- On October 6, 2008 the town of Tomiai was merged into the expanded city of Kumamoto.
- On March 23, 2010 the town of Jōnan, along with the town of Ueki, from Kamoto District, was merged into the expanded city of Kumamoto.
