= Index of Japan-related articles =

This page lists Japan-related articles.

== Alphabetical indices ==
- Index of Japan-related articles (0–9)
- Index of Japan-related articles (A)
- Index of Japan-related articles (B)
- Index of Japan-related articles (C)
- Index of Japan-related articles (D)
- Index of Japan-related articles (E)
- Index of Japan-related articles (F)
- Index of Japan-related articles (G)
- Index of Japan-related articles (H)
- Index of Japan-related articles (I)
- Index of Japan-related articles (J)
- Index of Japan-related articles (K)
- Index of Japan-related articles (L)
- Index of Japan-related articles (M)
- Index of Japan-related articles (N)
- Index of Japan-related articles (O)
- Index of Japan-related articles (P)
- Index of Japan-related articles (Q–R)
- Index of Japan-related articles (S)
- Index of Japan-related articles (T)
- Index of Japan-related articles (U–V)
- Index of Japan-related articles (W–X)
- Index of Japan-related articles (Y–Z)

== Navigation ==
- List of cities in Japan
- List of Japanese people
- List of records of Japan

== See also ==
- Outline of Japan
- Lists of country-related topics
