= List of cultural properties of Japan – structures (Ehime) =

This list is of the cultural properties of Japan designated in the category of structures (建造物, kenzōbutsu) for the Prefecture of Ehime.

== National Cultural Properties ==
As of 1 July 2015, forty-eight Important Cultural Properties (including three *National Treasures) with one hundred and nineteen component structures have been designated, being of national significance.

Property	Date	Municipality	Comments	Image	Coordinates	Ref.
Isaniwa Jinja 伊佐爾波神社; Isaniwa Jinja	1667	Matsuyama	designation comprises four components: the honden, mōshidono and corridor, rōmon, and kairō		33°51′03″N 132°47′20″E	
Iō-ji Hondō Zushi 医王寺本堂内厨子; Iōji hondō nai zushi	1534	Tōon			33°48′26″N 132°54′33″E	
Uwajima Castle Tenshu 宇和島城天守; Uwajima-jō tenshu	1664-5	Uwajima			33°13′10″N 132°33′55″E	
Iwaya-ji Daishidō 岩屋寺大師堂; Iwayaji Daishidō	1920	Kumakōgen			33°39′32″N 132°58′51″E	

== Prefectural Cultural Properties ==
As of 27 March 2015, thirty properties have been designated at a prefectural level.

Property	Date	Municipality	Comments	Image	Coordinates	Ref.
Enmyō-ji Yatsuashimon 円明寺八脚門; Enmyōji yatsuashimon		Matsuyama			33°53′29″N 132°44′24″E	for all refs see
Enmyō-ji Zushi 円明寺厨子; Enmyōji zushi		Matsuyama			33°53′29″N 132°44′24″E	
Meikyōkan 明教館; Meikyōkan		Matsuyama	Han school		33°50′32″N 132°46′48″E	
Bekku Ōyamazumi Jinja Haiden 別宮大山祇神社拝殿; Bekku Ōyamazumi Jinja haiden		Imabari			34°04′07″N 132°59′42″E	
Kōgan-ji Three-Storey Pagoda 興願寺三重塔; Kōganji sanjūnotō		Shikokuchūō			33°59′03″N 133°32′50″E	
Kōryū-ji Three-Storey Pagoda 興隆寺三重塔; Kōryūji sanjūnotō	1836	Saijō			33°54′20″N 133°01′31″E	
Shōbō-ji Kannondō 正法寺観音堂; Shōbōji Kannondō		Uwajima			33°18′22″N 132°36′17″E	

== Municipal Cultural Properties ==
As of 1 May 2014, two hundred and forty-one properties have been designated at a municipal level.

== Registered Cultural Properties ==
As of 1 July 2015, one hundred and ten properties have been registered (as opposed to designated) at a national level.

== See also ==
- Cultural Properties of Japan
- National Treasures of Japan
- List of Historic Sites of Japan (Ehime)
- List of Cultural Properties of Japan - paintings (Ehime)
- List of Cultural Properties of Japan - historical materials (Ehime)
- List of Cultural Properties of Japan - archaeological materials (Ehime)
