= Kasei =

Kasei (火星) is the Japanese word for Mars. It may also refer to:

== Places ==
- Kasei Valles, a canyon on Mars
- Kasei, Kenya, a village in Kenya
- Kasei, Ghana, a village in Ghana

== Transportation ==
- Mitsubishi Kasei, a World War II aircraft engine used on many Japanese warplanes
- Kasei Station, a train station on the Fujikyuko Line in Tsuru, Yamanashi, Japan
- Toritsu-Kasei Station, a train station on the Seibu Shinjuku Line in Nakano, Tokyo, Japan

== Educational institutions ==
- Tokyo Kasei-Gakuin University, a private university in Tokyo
- Tokyo Kasei-Gakuin Junior College, a women's university in Tokyo
- Tokyo Kasei University, a private university in Tokyo

== Other ==
- Kasei culture of late Edo period in Japan 1804–1829
- Asahi Kasei, a Japanese chemical conglomerate
- Rakuto Kasei, a Japanese multinational chemical company
