= Oita Marine Palace Aquarium =

Oita Marine Palace Aquarium Umitamago
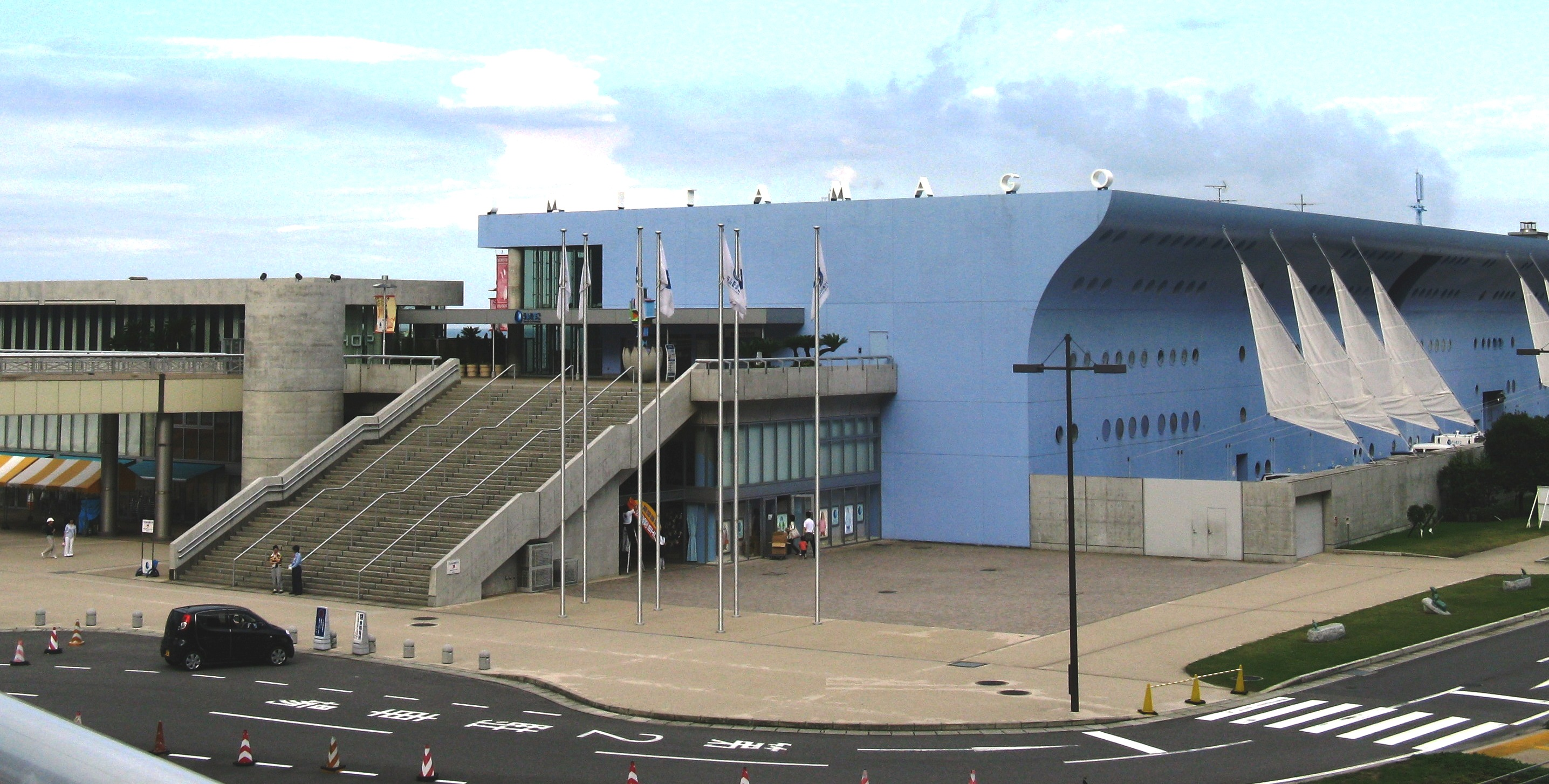
- Oita Marine Palace Aquarium Umitamago
- Interactive map of Oita Marine Palace Aquarium Umitamago
- Date opened: 1 April 2004
- Location: Oita City, Oita, Japan
- Land area: 11,000 m^{2} (120,000 sq ft)
- No. of animals: 15,000
- No. of species: 500
- Total volume of tanks: 3,500,000 litres (925,000 US gal)
- Memberships: JAZA
- Website: www.umitamago.jp/index-en/

The Oita Marine Palace Aquarium (大分マリーンパレス水族館, Ōita Marin Paresu Suizokukan) is located on the Takasaki Yamashita Coast in Oita City, Oita Prefecture, Japan. Its common name is Umitamago (うみたまご).

The aquarium opened in 1964 as the Oita Marine Palace Ecological Aquarium, and was reopened on April 1, 2004 as the Oita Marine Palace Aquarium "Umitamago". It is a member of the Japanese Association of Zoos and Aquariums (JAZA), and the aquarium is accredited as a Museum-equivalent facilities by the Museum Act from Ministry of Education, Culture, Sports, Science and Technology.

== History ==
=== Oita Ecological Aquarium Marine Palace ===
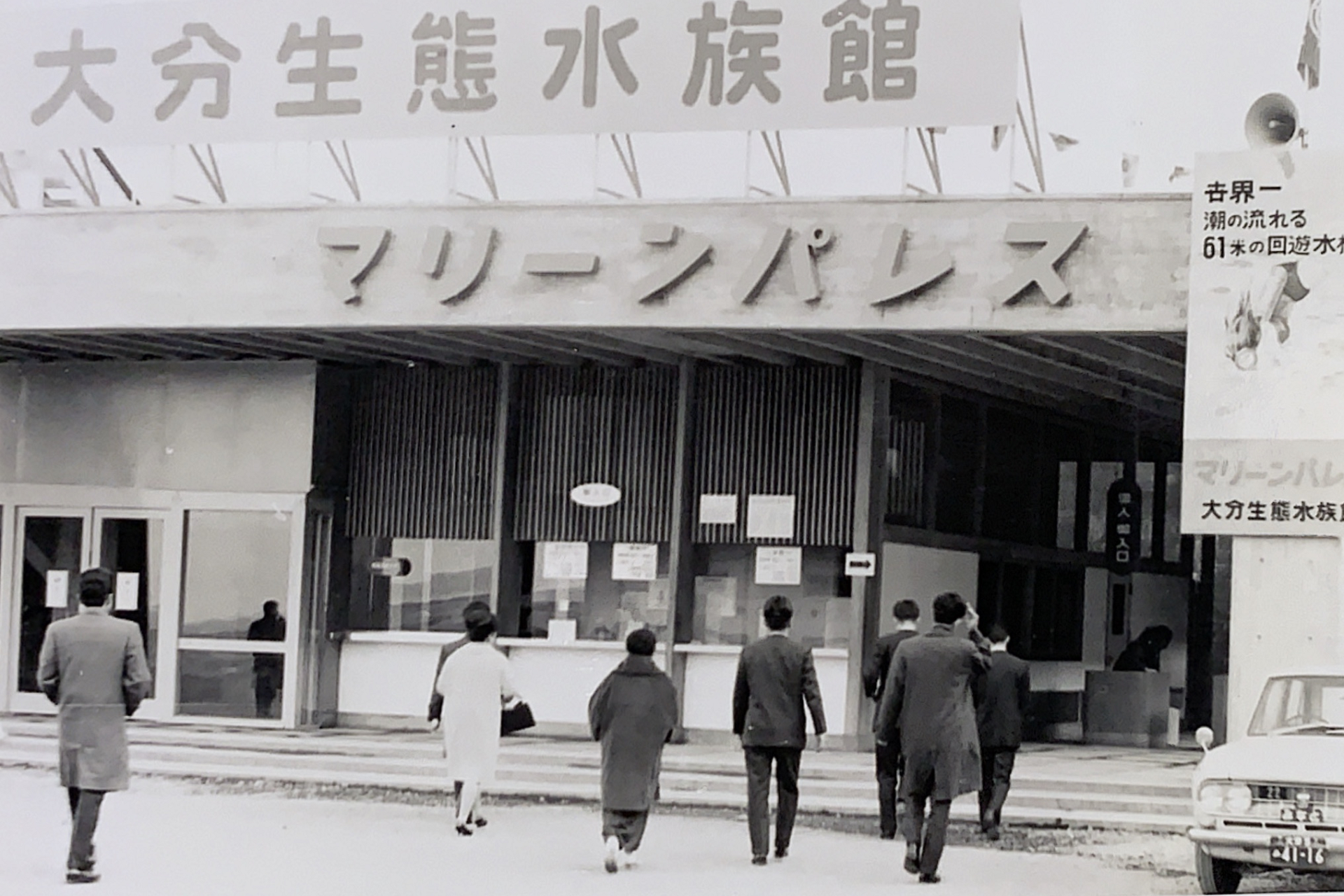
Oita Ecological Aquarium Marine Palace（1960）

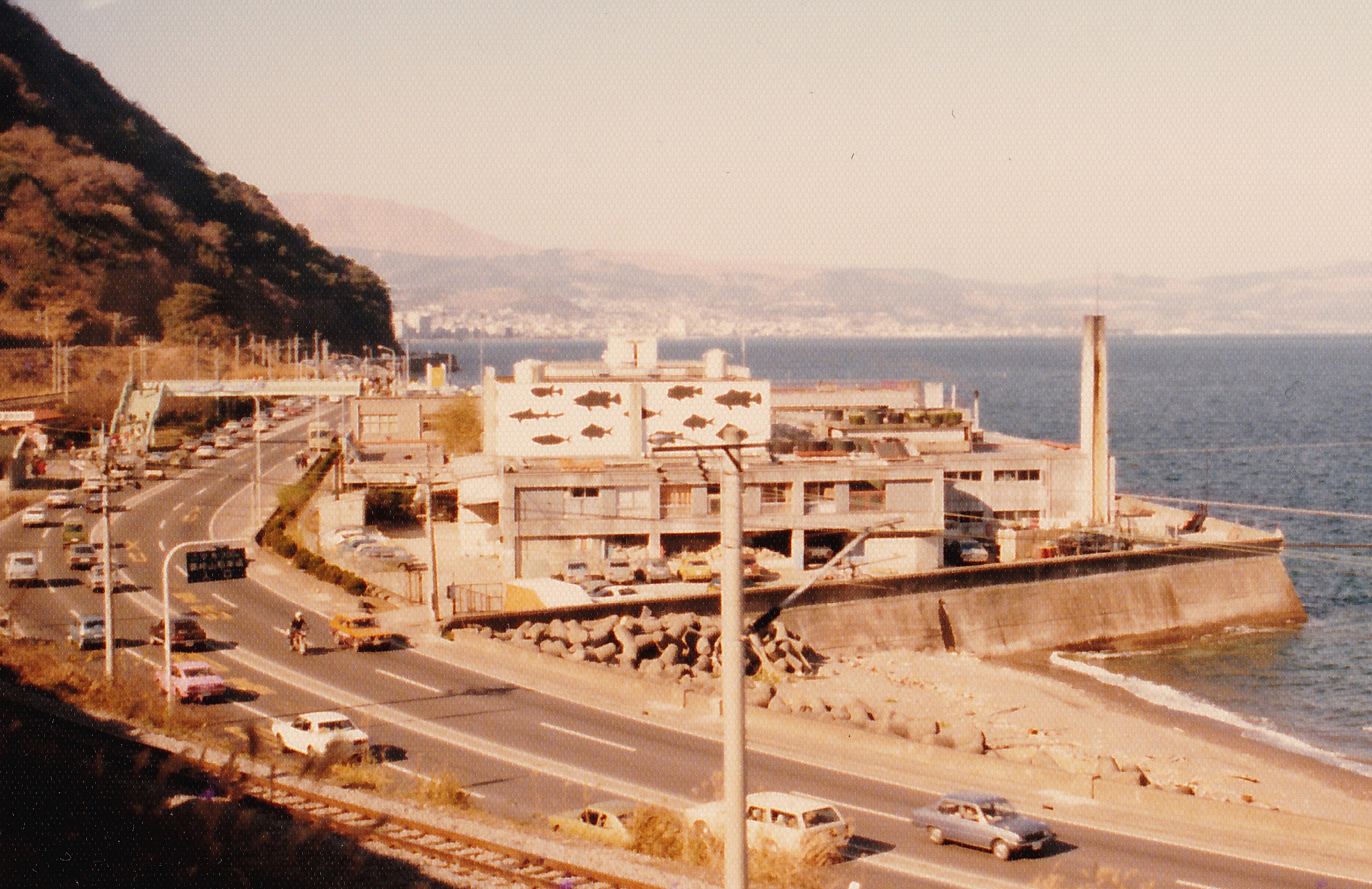
Oita Ecological Aquarium Marine Palace（1978）

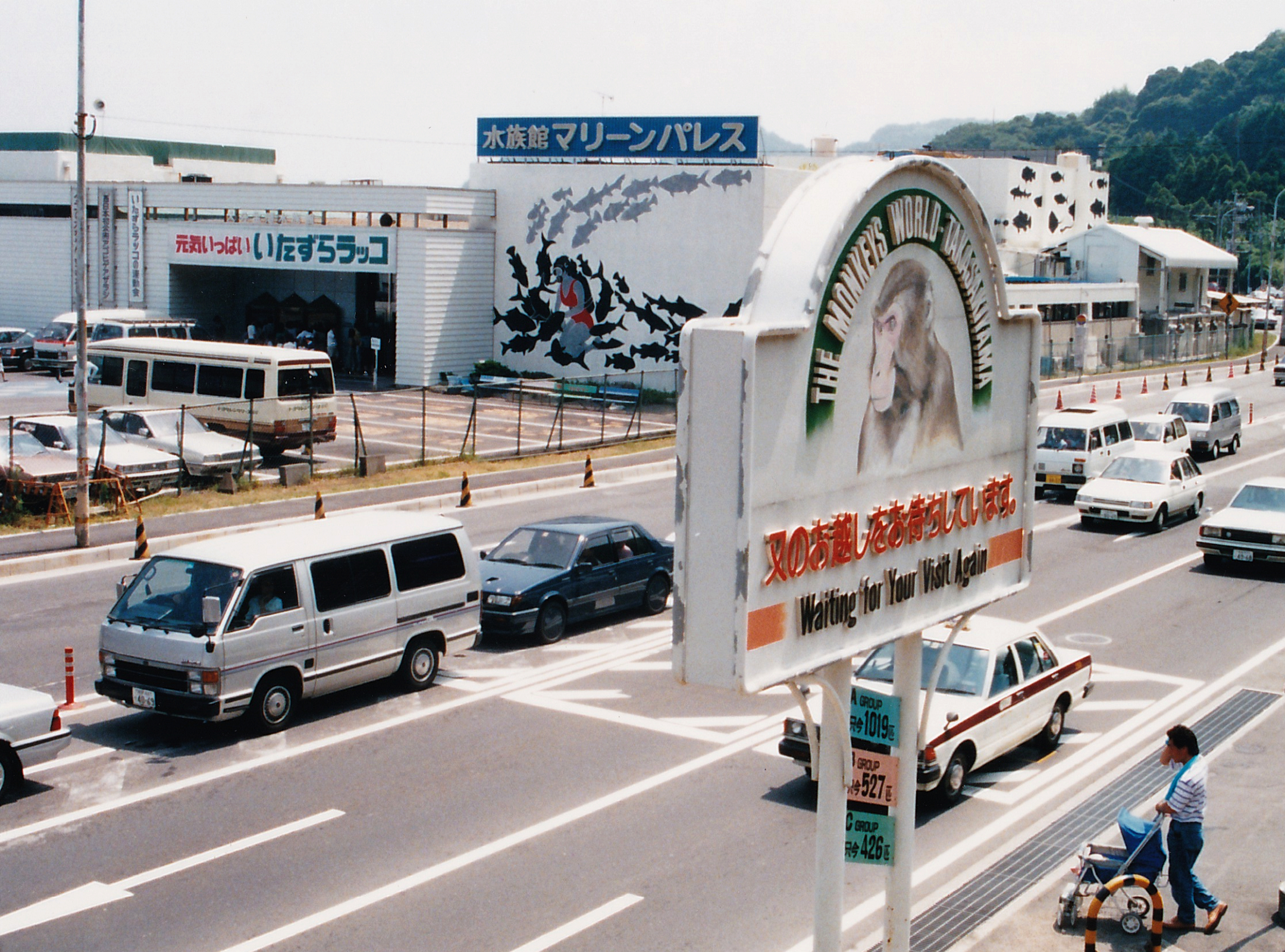
Oita Ecological Aquarium Marine Palace（1990）

The Oita Ecological Aquarium Marine Palace is the brainchild of Tamotsu Ueda, former mayor of Oita City, who was also responsible for the Takasaki Nature Zoo.

It was the first aquarium in the world to realize a tidal current type migration tank, and for the first seven years after its opening, it was the most visited aquarium in Japan. Since its opening, the aquarium has also established a research department to conduct academic research. With the widening of Betsudaikoku Road, the old building was demolished and replaced by a pedestrian walkway and road.

In March 1964, Oita Ecological Aquarium Co, Ltd. was established, and Oita Ecological Aquarium Marine Palace was opened in October.

In July 1966, an experimental corner was opened and the world's first fish acrobatics were realized in September, the Crown Prince and Princess of Japan, Emperor Hirohito and Empress Nagako visited the aquarium. In May 1967, the annual number of visitors exceeded 1 million.

In December 1968, dugongs were bred and exhibited to the public. In October 1971, the company name was changed from "Oita Marine Palace Aquarium Co.

1981, in July, the aquarium was designated as a museum by the Ministry of Education, Culture, Sports, Science and Technology.

In August 1990, the first sea otter show in Japan was opened to the public.

In September 1995, a 62 cm (2.03 ft) fry was brought in from a pregnant whale shark caught in Taiwan, and the world's first whale shark fry began captivity. Named "Jiji" and opened to the public. A new "Whale Shark Corner" was also established, displaying specimens of whale shark eggshells and fetuses. Jiji was kept for three years and eventually grew to 370 cm (12.1 ft).

On December 1, 2003, the museum was renovated due to aging and closed accordingly.

=== Opening of Oita Marine Palace Aquarium "Umitamago" ===
The new facility is the former "Oita Ecology Aquarium Marine Palace," which has been renovated and reopened on an approximate three-fold increase in size, and is located along National Route 10 between Oita and Beppu (Beedai National Route), facing Beppu Bay, approximately 1.8 km (5,900 ft) to the city border with Beppu City.

Along with its reopening, the aquarium's name was changed to Oita Marine Palace Aquarium "Umitamago".

== Gallery ==
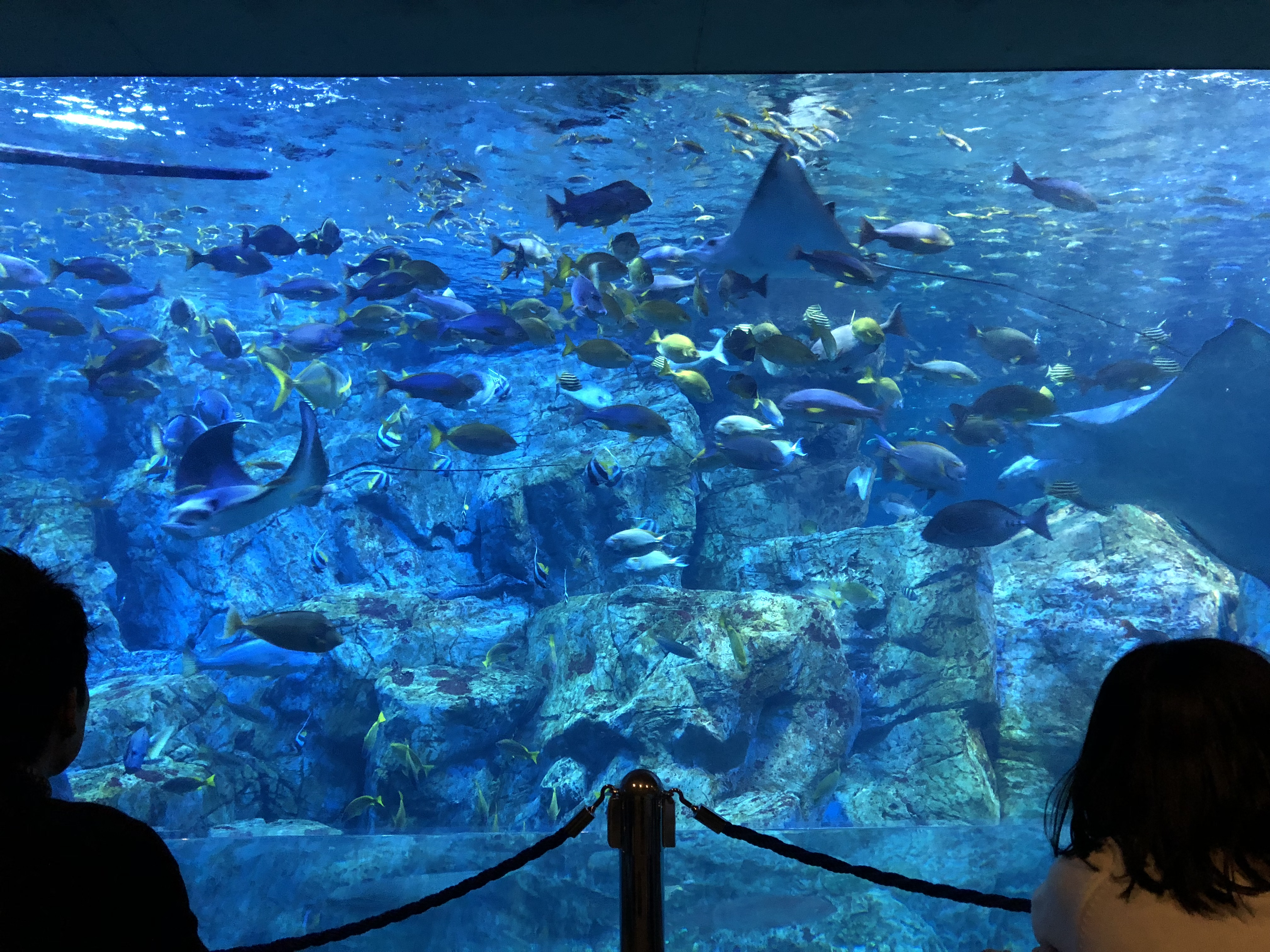

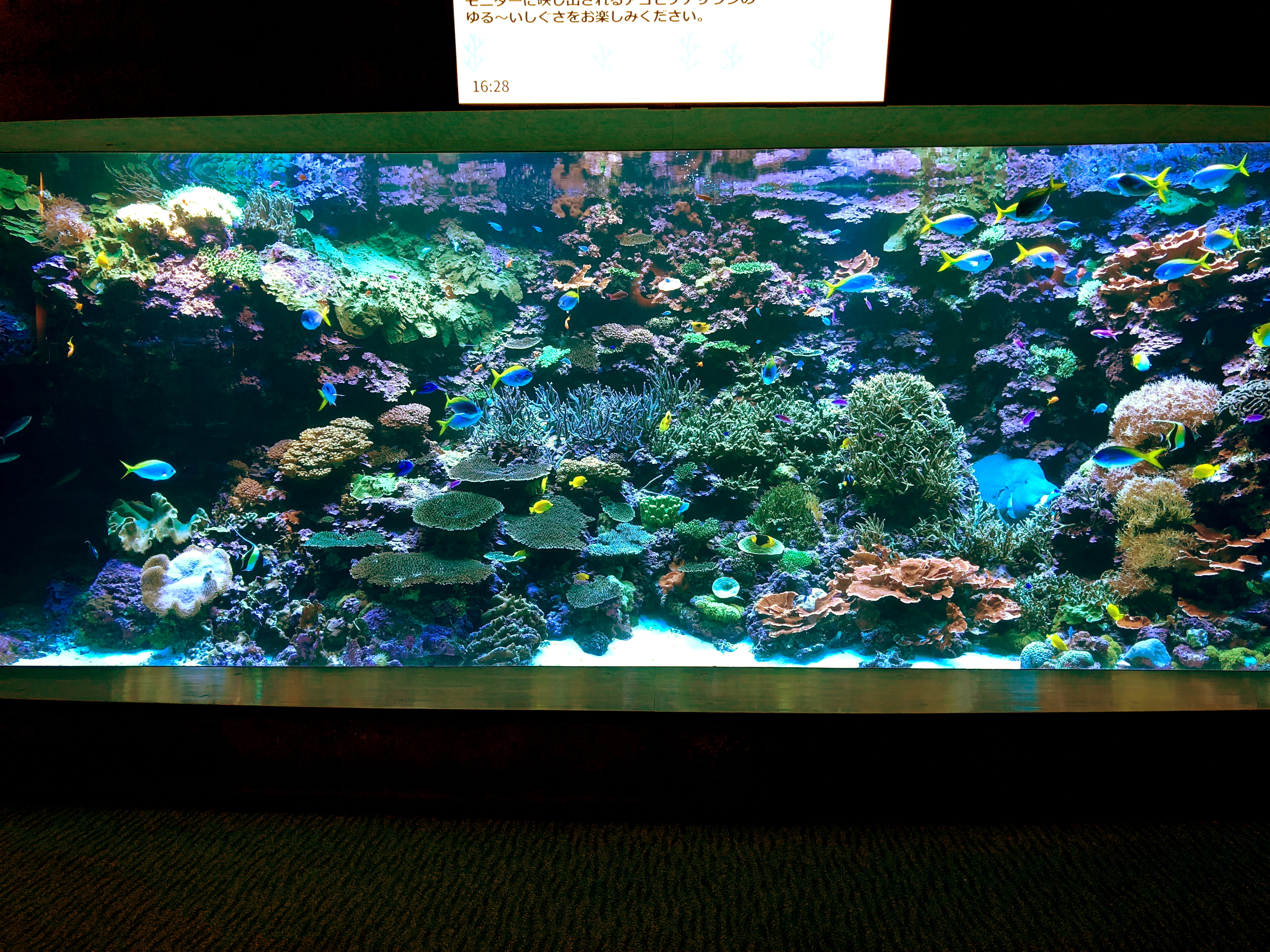

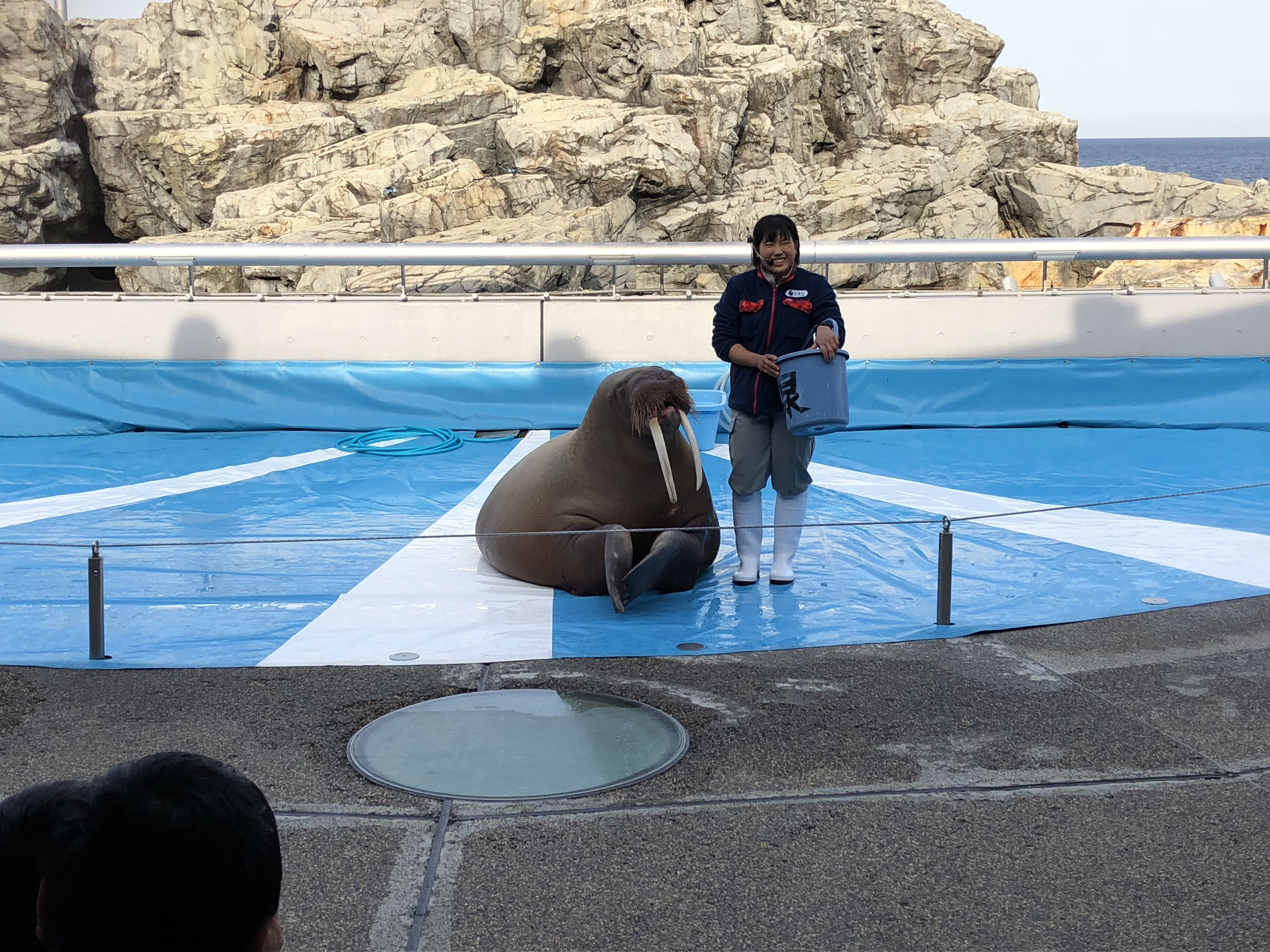

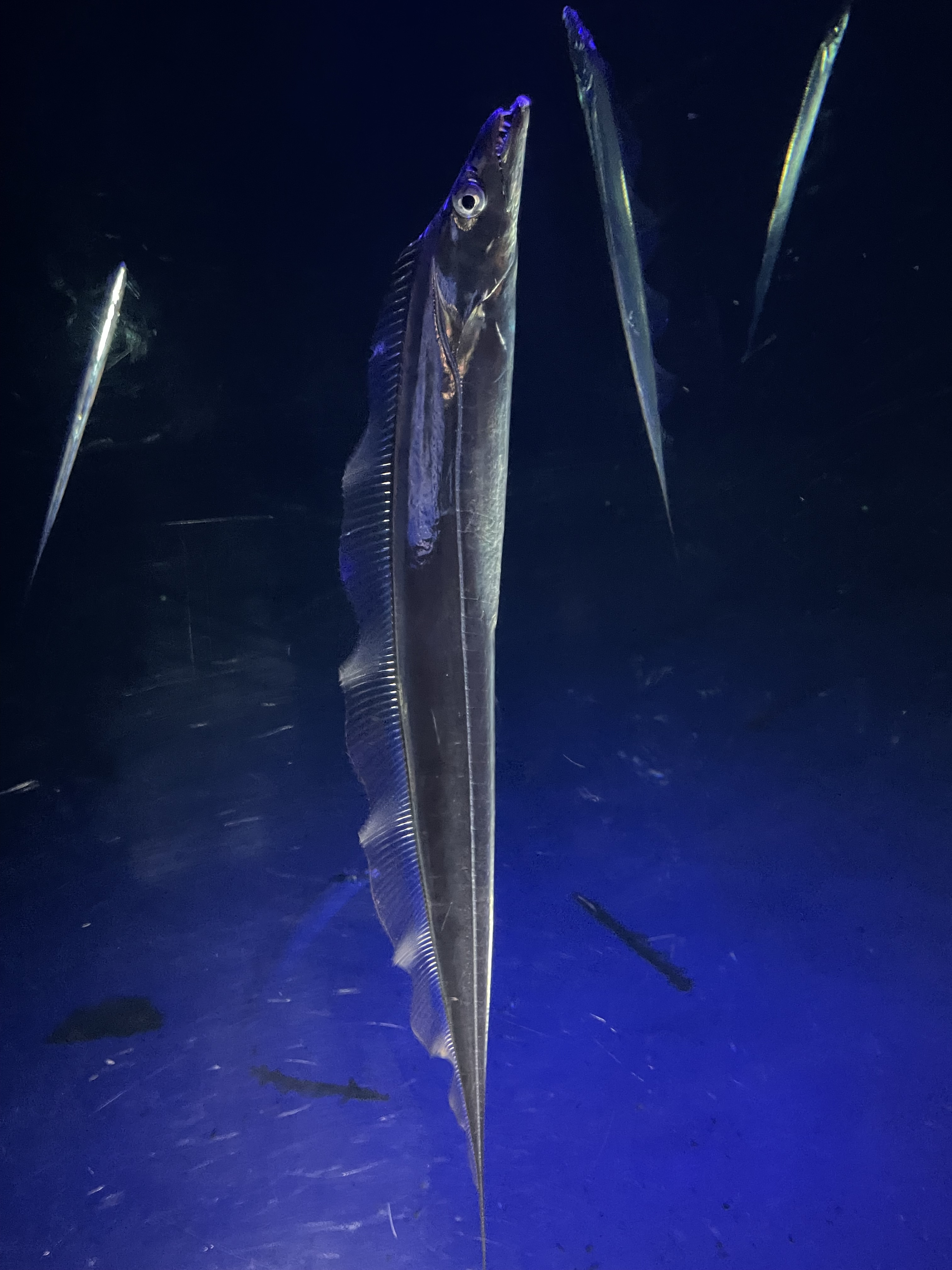

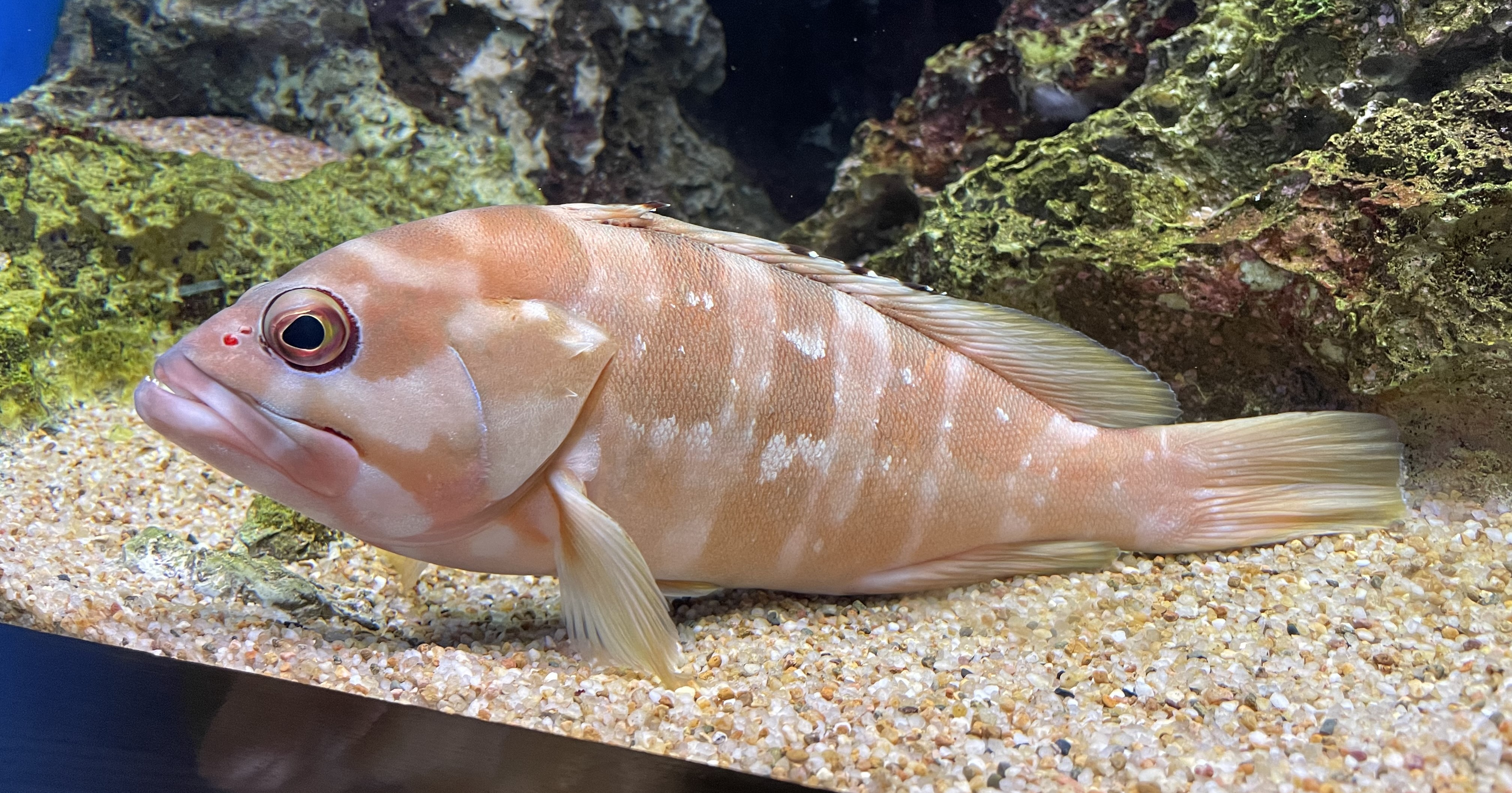

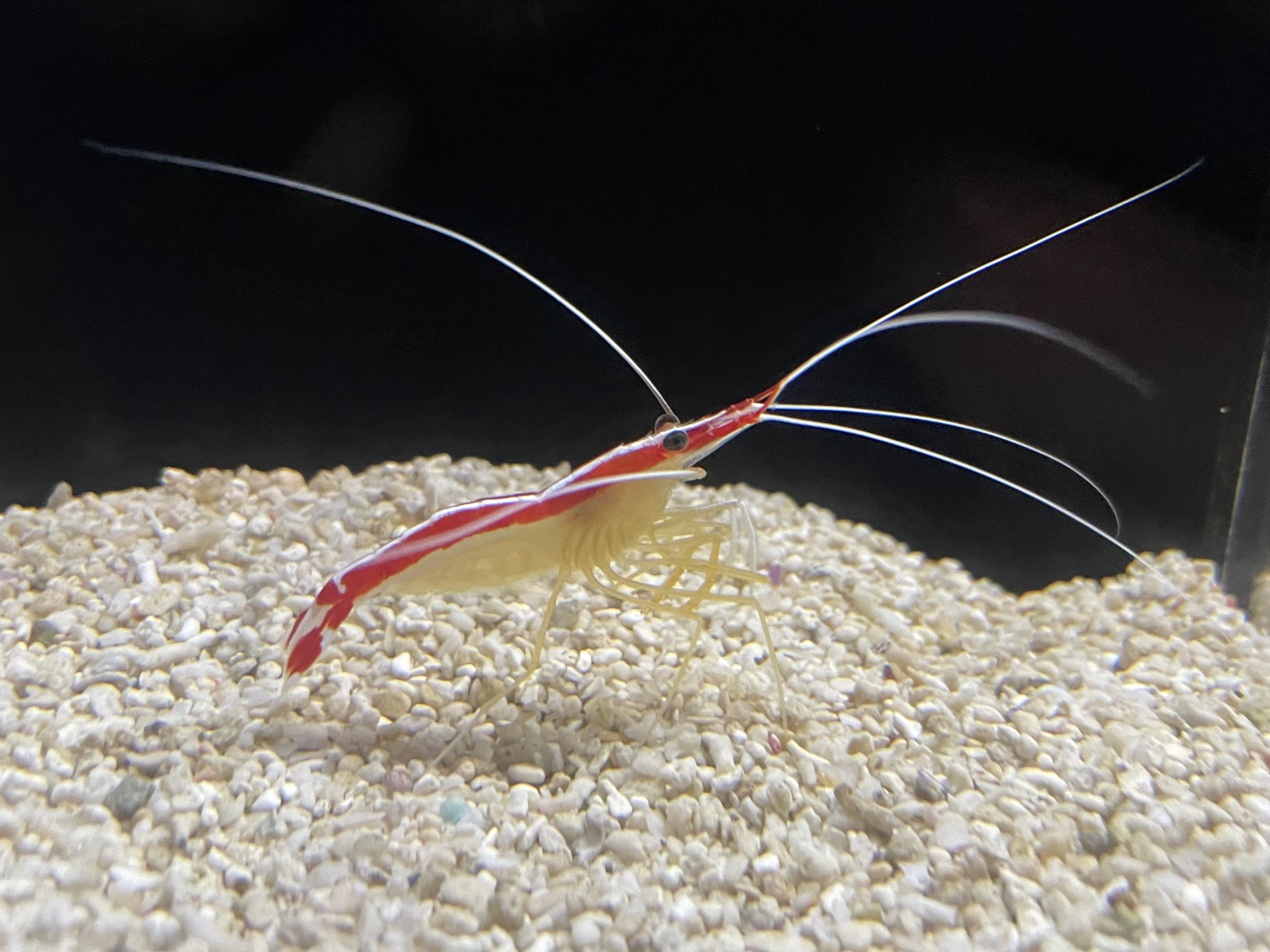

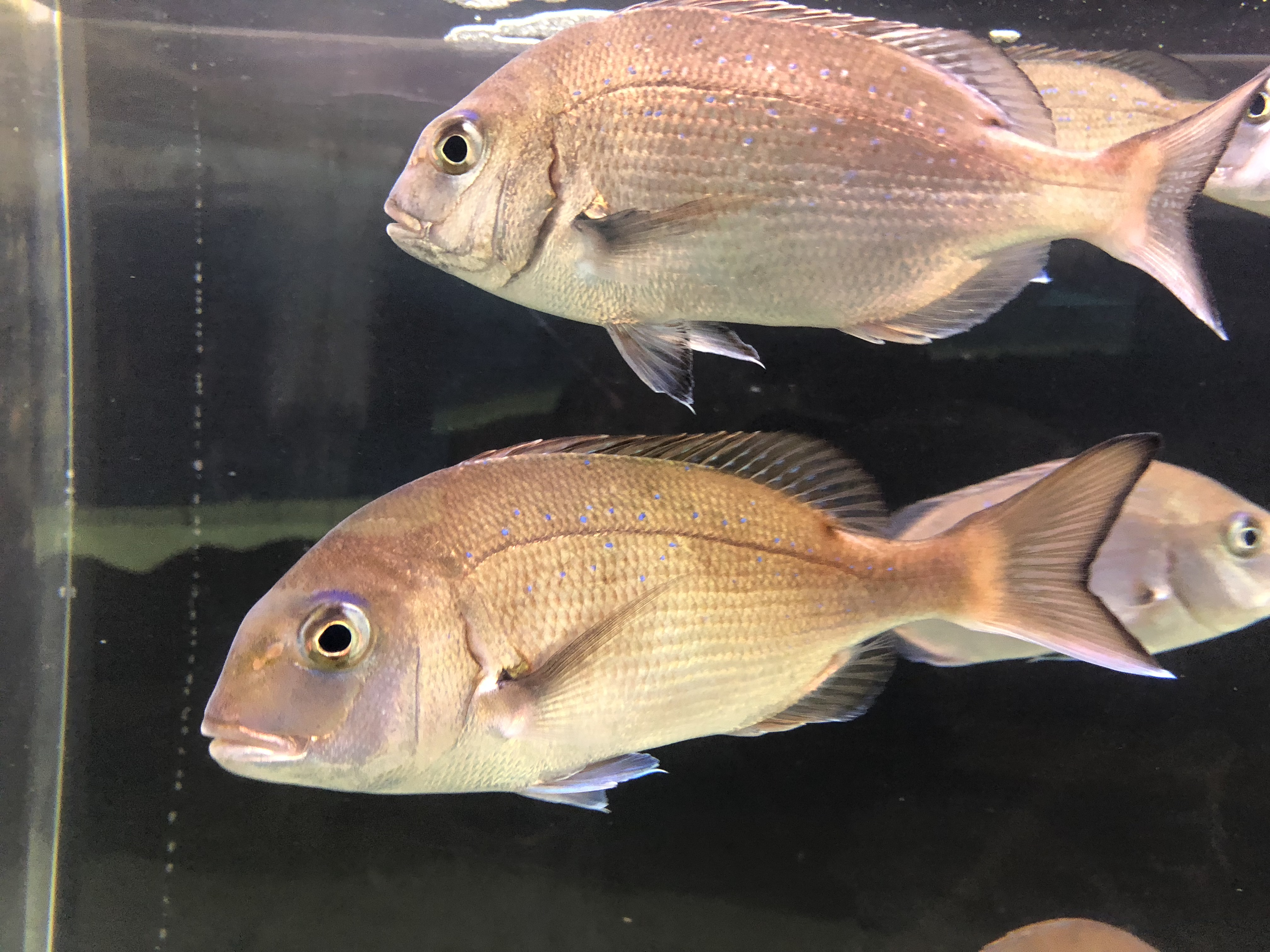

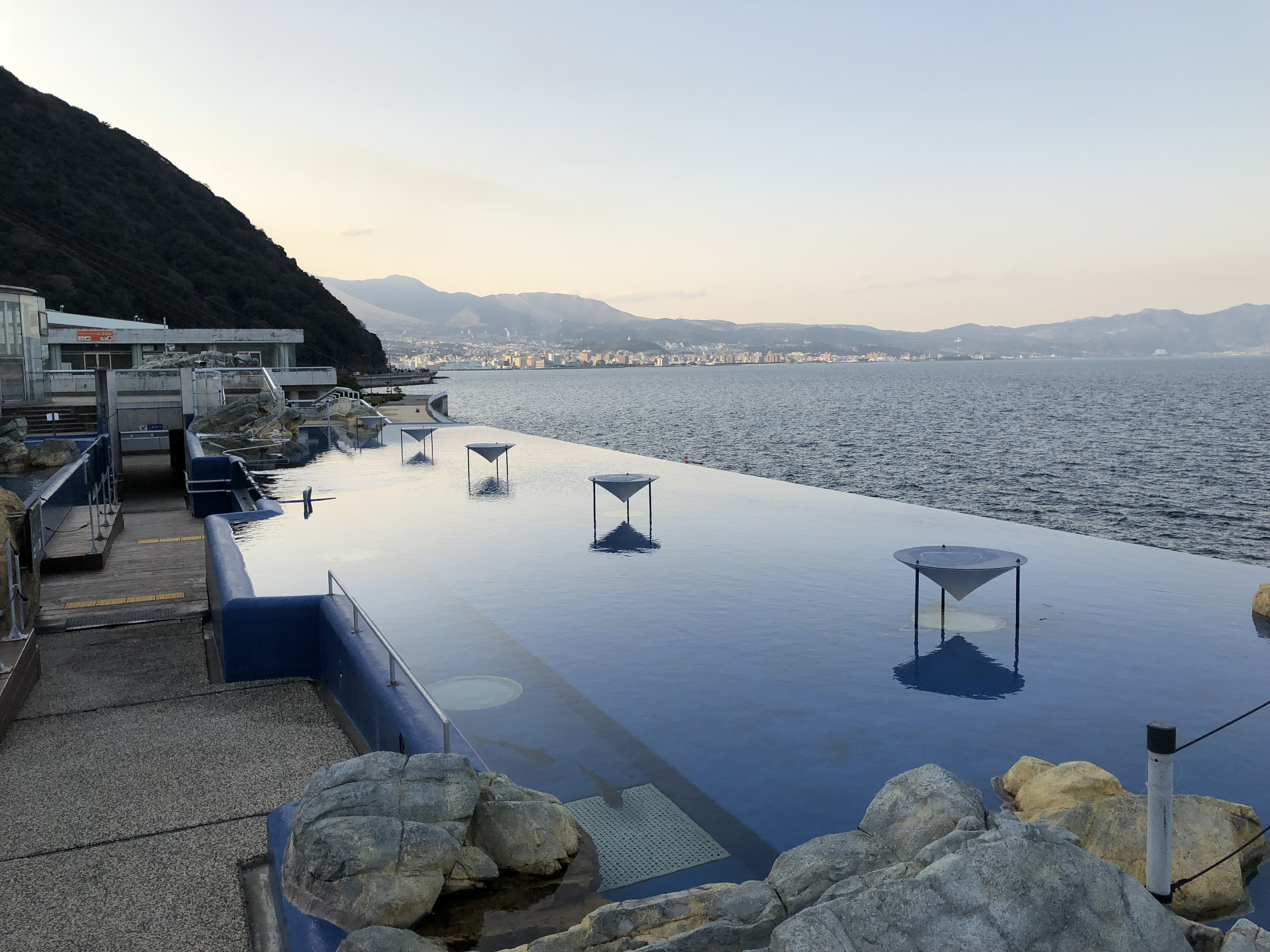

== See also ==
- Ōita Station
