= Index of Japan-related articles (E) =

This page lists Japan-related articles with romanized titles beginning with the letter E. For names of people, please list by surname (i.e., "Tarō Yamada" should be listed under "Y", not "T"). Please also ignore particles (e.g. "a", "an", "the") when listing articles (i.e., "A City with No People" should be listed under "City").

== E ==
- E1 Series Shinkansen
- E2 Series Shinkansen
- E3 Series Shinkansen
- E4 Series Shinkansen

== Ea ==
- EarthBound
- Earth Federation
- East Asian languages
- East China Sea
- East Japan Railway Company

== Eb ==
- Ebetsu, Hokkaidō
- Ebina, Kanagawa
- Ebino, Miyazaki
- Ebirah, Horror of the Deep
- Ebisu Station (Hyōgo)
- Ebisu Station (Tokyo)

== Ec ==
- Ecchi
- Echi District, Shiga
- Echigawa, Shiga
- Echigo Province
- Echizen Province
- Economic history of Japan
- Economy of Japan

== Ed ==
- Edo
- Edo period
- Edogawa Ranpo
- Edogawa, Tokyo
- Education in Japan
- Educational reform in occupied Japan

== Eh ==
- Ehime Prefecture
- Ehime Maru incident
- Ehrgeiz

== Ei ==
- Ei, Kagoshima
- Eigenji, Shiga
- Eihei-ji
- Eiheiji, Fukui
- Eikaiwa
- Eirin
- Eisai
- Eison
- El-Hazard

== Ek ==
- Ekai Kawaguchi
- Ekan Ikeguchi
- Kaori Ekuni

== El ==
- Elections in Japan

== Em ==
- Emishi
- Emoji
- Emperor Ankan
- Emperor Ankō
- Emperor Annei
- Emperor Antoku
- Emperor Bidatsu
- Emperor Buretsu
- Emperor Chōkei
- Emperor Chūai
- Emperor Chūkyō
- Emperor Daigo
- Emperor En'yū
- Emperor Fushimi
- Emperor Go-Daigo
- Emperor Go-En'yū
- Emperor Go-Fukakusa
- Emperor Go-Fushimi
- Emperor Go-Hanazono
- Emperor Go-Horikawa
- Emperor Go-Ichijō
- Emperor Go-Kameyama
- Emperor Go-Kashiwabara
- Emperor Go-Kōgon
- Emperor Go-Komatsu
- Emperor Go-Kōmyō
- Emperor Go-Mizunoo
- Emperor Go-Momozono
- Emperor Go-Murakami
- Emperor Go-Nara
- Emperor Go-Nijō
- Emperor Go-Reizei
- Emperor Go-Saga
- Emperor Go-Sai
- Emperor Go-Sanjō
- Emperor Go-Shirakawa
- Emperor Go-Suzaku
- Emperor Go-Toba
- Emperor Go-Tsuchimikado
- Emperor Go-Uda
- Emperor Go-Yōzei
- Emperor Hanazono
- Emperor Hanzei
- Emperor Heizei
- Emperor Higashiyama
- Emperor Horikawa
- Emperor Ichijō
- Emperor Ingyō
- Emperor Itoku
- Emperor Jimmu
- Emperor Jomei
- Emperor Junna
- Emperor Junnin
- Emperor Juntoku
- Emperor Kaika
- Emperor Kameyama
- Emperor Kanmu
- Emperor Kazan
- Emperor Keikō
- Emperor Keitai
- Emperor Kenzō
- Emperor Kinmei

== Em (cont'd) ==
- Emperor Kōan
- Emperor Kōbun
- Emperor Kōgen
- Emperor Kōgon
- Emperor Kōkaku
- Emperor Kōkō
- Emperor Kōmei
- Emperor Kōmyō
- Emperor Kōnin
- Emperor Konoe
- Emperor Kōrei
- Emperor Kōshō
- Emperor Kōtoku
- Emperor Meiji
- Emperor Momozono
- Emperor Monmu
- Emperor Montoku
- Emperor Murakami
- Emperor Nakamikado
- Emperor Nijō
- Emperor Ninmyō
- Emperor Ninken
- Emperor Ninkō
- Emperor Nintoku
- Emperor Ōgimachi
- Emperor Ōjin
- Emperor Reigen
- Emperor Reizei
- Emperor Richū
- Emperor Rokujō
- Emperor Saga
- Emperor Sakuramachi
- Emperor Sanjō
- Emperor Seamounts
- Emperor Seimu
- Emperor Seinei
- Emperor Seiwa
- Emperor Senka
- Emperor Shijō
- Emperor Shirakawa
- Emperor Shōkō
- Emperor Shōmu
- Emperor Suinin
- Emperor Suizei
- Emperor Sujin
- Emperor Sukō
- Emperor Sushun
- Emperor Sutoku
- Emperor Suzaku
- Emperor Takakura
- Emperor Taishō
- Emperor Tenmu
- Emperor Tenji
- Emperor Toba
- Emperor Tsuchimikado
- Emperor Uda
- Emperor Yōmei
- Emperor Yōzei
- Emperor Yūryaku
- The Emperor's Birthday
- Empress Genmei
- Empress Genshō
- Empress Go-Sakuramachi
- Empress Jitō
- Empress Kōgyoku
- Empress Kōken
- Empress Meishō
- Empress Saimei
- Empress Suiko

== En ==
- Ena, Gifu
- Ena District, Gifu
- Shūsaku Endō
- Engrish
- Enichi-ji
- Eniwa, Hokkaidō
- Enjo kōsai
- Enka
- Enkōji
- Enmyō-in
- Enmyō-ji
- Enni
- Ennichi
- Ennin
- En no Gyōja
- Enokitake
- Enola Gay
- Enomoto Takeaki
- Enoshima
- Enoshima Engi
- Enryaku-ji
- Enzan

== Es ==
- Esaki Leona
- Esashi, Iwate
- Esashi, Hokkaidō (Hiyama)
- Esashi, Hokkaidō (Soya)
- Esashi District, Hokkaidō
- Makiko Esumi

== Et ==
- Etajima, Hiroshima
- Etchū Province
- Ethnic issues in Japan
- Ethnic Japanese

== Eu ==
- Eulenburg Expedition

== Ev ==
- Everlasting (Every Little Thing album)
- Every Little Thing (band)

== Ex ==
- Excel Saga
- Extended Unix Code
