= Index of Japan-related articles (D) =

This page lists Japan-related articles with romanized titles beginning with the letter D. For names of people, please list by surname (i.e., "Tarō Yamada" should be listed under "Y", not "T"). Please also ignore particles (e.g. "a", "an", "the") when listing articles (i.e., "A City with No People" should be listed under "City").

== Da ==
- Da Pump
- Dabo
- Dabura
- Daibutsu
- Daibutsuyō
- Daigo-ji
- Dai-Ichi Kangyo Bank
- Akitaro Daichi
- Daiei
- Daiei, Tottori
- Daigo-ji
- Daihatsu
- Daikaku-ji
- Daikokuten
- Daikon
- Dai Kannon of Kita no Miyako park
- Daimoku
- Daimyō
- Daisen, Tottori
- Daisetsu Teitaro Suzuki
- Daishi
- Daitō, Osaka
- Daito Bunka University
- Daito-ryu aiki-jujutsu
- Daitō, Shimane
- Daitō, Shizuoka
- Daiwa, Hiroshima
- Daiwa, Shimane
- Daizen-ji
- Liza Dalby
- Dan Hibiki
- Dance Dance Revolution
- Dango
- Danka system
- Darius Gaiden
- Darkstalkers
- Daruma doll
- Dahrumasan ga Koronda
- Darunia
- Dashi
- Data East
- Date, Hokkaidō
- Kimiko Date
- Date Masamune
- Dating sim
- Datsun 1500, 1600, 2000 Roadster
- Datsun 510
- Dazai Osamu
- Dazaifu, Fukuoka

== De ==
- Deba bōchō
- Arudou Debito
- Dejima
- Deko Boko Friends
- Deku Scrubs
- Deku Tree
- Aiguille Delaz
- Democratic Party of Japan
- Demographics of Japan
- Deployment of Japanese troops to Iraq
- Destroy All Monsters
- Detective Conan
- Devilman
- Dewa Province

== Di ==
- Diana (Sailor Moon)
- Diddy Kong
- Diet of Japan
- Digimon
- Digivolve
- Dir En Grey
- Disability policy in Japan
- Distance (film)
- District
- Districts of Japan

== Dn ==
- D.N.Angel
- DNA²

== Do ==
- Do As Infinity
- DoCo
- Doctor Eggman
- Doctor Yellow
- Dogen Zenji
- Dōgo Onsen
- Doh Yoh
- Takako Doi
- Toshiyuki Doi
- Doi, Ehime
- Kenji Doihara
- DoJa
- Dojin game
- Dōjinshi
- Dojo
- Domo-kun
- Domon Ken Award
- Kōichi Dōmoto
- Tsuyoshi Dōmoto
- Donabe
- Donald Keene
- Donari, Tokushima
- Donburi
- Donkey Kong
- Doolittle Raid
- Doraemon
- Dororo
- Doshin the Giant
- Doshisha University
- Doshu
- Double Dragon
- Douglas MacArthur

== Dr ==
- Dr. Gero
- Dr. Mario
- Dr. Slump
- Dragon Ash
- Dragon Ball
- Dragon Ball (artifact)
- Dragon Ball (original series)
- Dragon Ball GT
- Dragon Ball Z
- Dragon Half
- Dragon Quest
- Dragon Quest Monsters
- Dragon Quest VII
- Último Dragón
- Drakengard
- Dreams Come True (band)

== Du ==
- Duck Hunt
- Dungeon Magic

== Dy ==
- Dynasty Warriors
