= Takasakiyama Natural Zoological Garden =

Monkey park in Ōita City, Ōita Prefecture

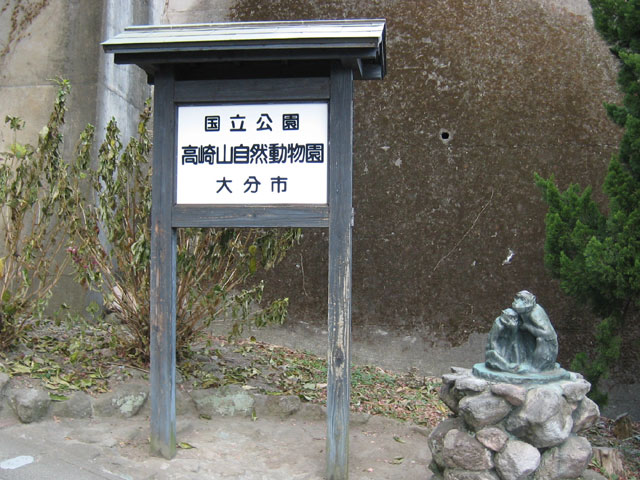
- Sign for Takasakiyama Natural Zoological Garden
- Interactive map of Takasakiyama Natural Zoological Garden
- 33.258287°N 131.532795°E
- Date opened: March 15, 1953
- Location: 3098-1 Kanzaki, Ōita City, Ōita Prefecture
- No. of animals: About 1,200 wild monkeys
- Website: http://www.takasakiyama.jp/

Takasakiyama Natural Zoological Garden (高崎山自然動物園, Takasakiyama Shizen Dōbutsuen), also called Takasakiyama Monkey Park, is a park located in Ōita City, Ōita Prefecture on Mount Takasaki (高崎山, Takasakiyama) known for its many wild Japanese macaques.

== Location ==
Mount Takasaki, the mountain on which Takasakiyama Natural Zoological Garden is located, borders Ōita City, Beppu, and Yufu. The parking lot for the zoological garden is located along Japan National Route 10 between Ōita City and Beppu and is shared with the Oita Marine Palace Aquarium.

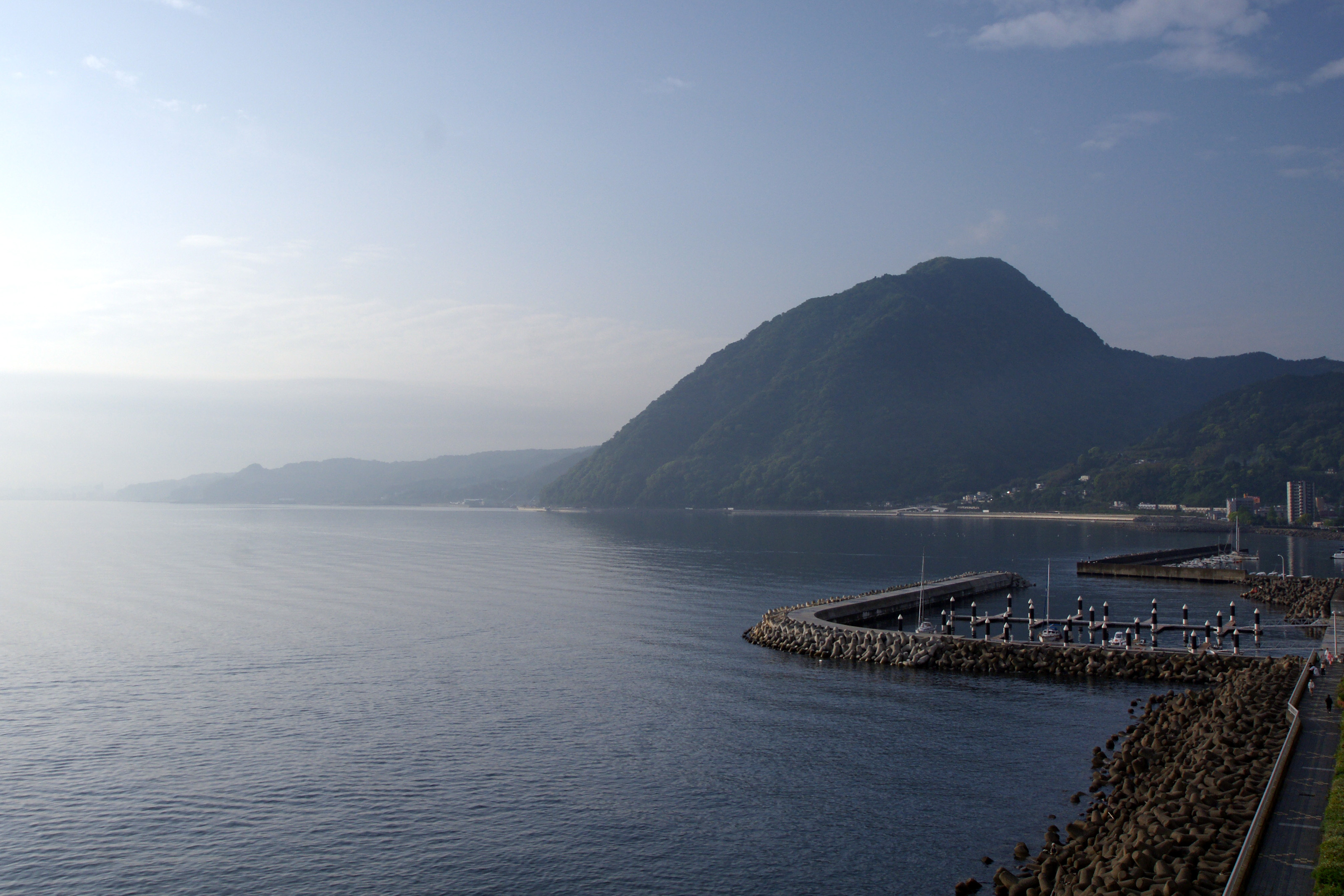
View of Mount Takasaki from Beppu

== History ==
In 1952, Ōita City Mayor Tamotsu Ueda, concerned about the damage that the Japanese macaques were doing to farms surrounding Mount Takasaki, sought to gather all of the monkeys into one location. The monkeys were fed sweet potatoes and began to remain on Mount Takasaki. In 1953, Takasakiyama Natural Zoological Garden was opened as a tourist attraction.

== Monkeys ==
The monkeys at Takasakiyama Natural Zoological Garden are Japanese macaques. Mount Takasaki is home to over 1,200 of these monkeys, and they have separated themselves into "troops" which take turns visiting the monkey park.

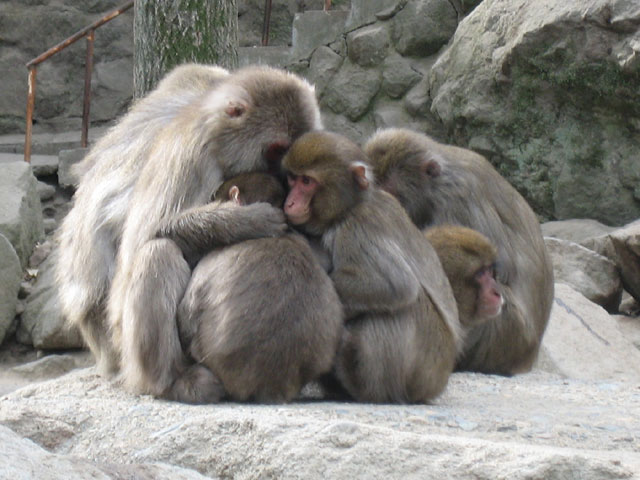
Monkeys gather together for warmth on cold days. This action is called "monkey dango" due to the monkeys resembling dango

There have been three troops observed on the mountain (named Troop A, Troop B, and Troop C), but Troop A has not been seen at the monkey park since 2002. Therefore, only Troops B and C appear at the park with Troop C visiting in the morning and Troop B in the afternoon. However, as the monkeys are wild, there are times that they do not visit the park.

The troops have complex social hierarchies. Takasakiyama made news in 2021 when Yakei, a female macaque, became the leader of Troop B. This was the first time in the park's history that a female monkey had taken the number one spot in a troop.

There are no fences or barriers separating visitors from the wild monkeys. The monkeys, being used to humans, allow visitors to come close to them and often approach visitors.

Although the monkeys are quite docile, visitors are advised to be cautious especially regarding young children. Visitors are requested not to tease or touch the monkeys, not to make eye contact with them, and not to feed them.

The monkeys are fed wheat every 30 minutes and sweet potatoes once a day. Feeding time causes the monkeys, who are usually dispersed throughout the park, to run towards the feeding location.

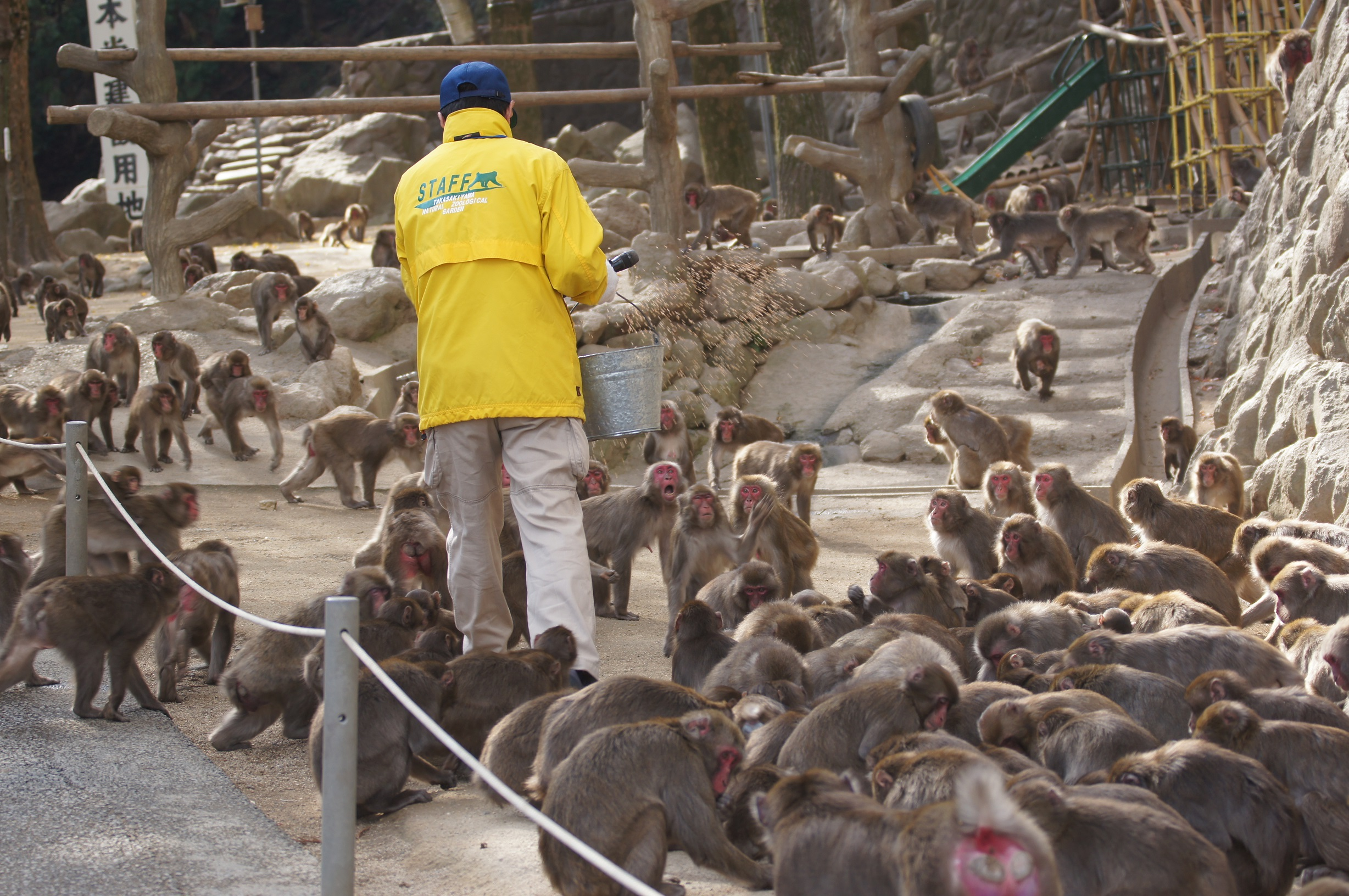
Worker feeding the monkeys at Takasakiyama

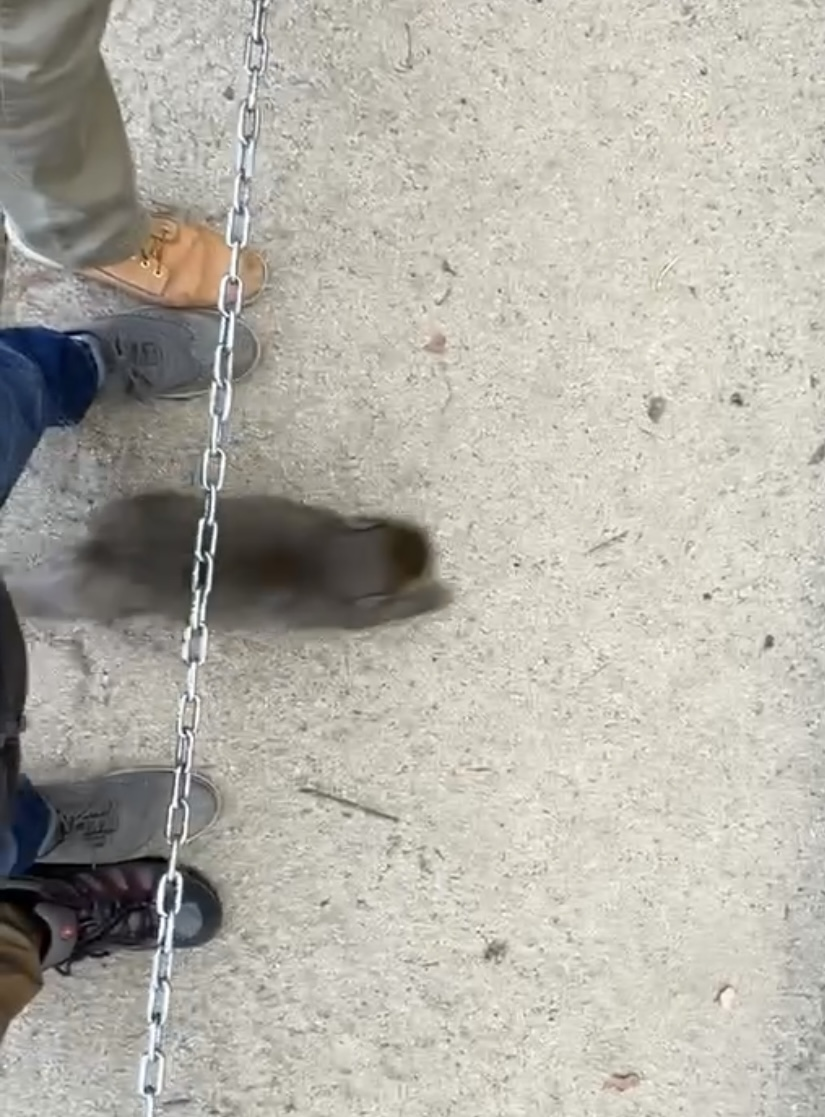
Japanese macaque runs through visitor's legs at the monkey park. This is considered to be good luck.

== Visitor information ==
=== Entrance fees ===
The admission fee is 520 yen for adults, 260 yen for children, and free for infants.

=== Hours ===
Hours are from 9:00-17:00 daily with last entry being at 16:30. There are no set closing days.

=== Access ===
From the park's entrance gate, it is about a five minute uphill walk to get to the park's main area where most of the monkeys gather. There is also an option to take a short slope car ride for 110 yen round-trip.

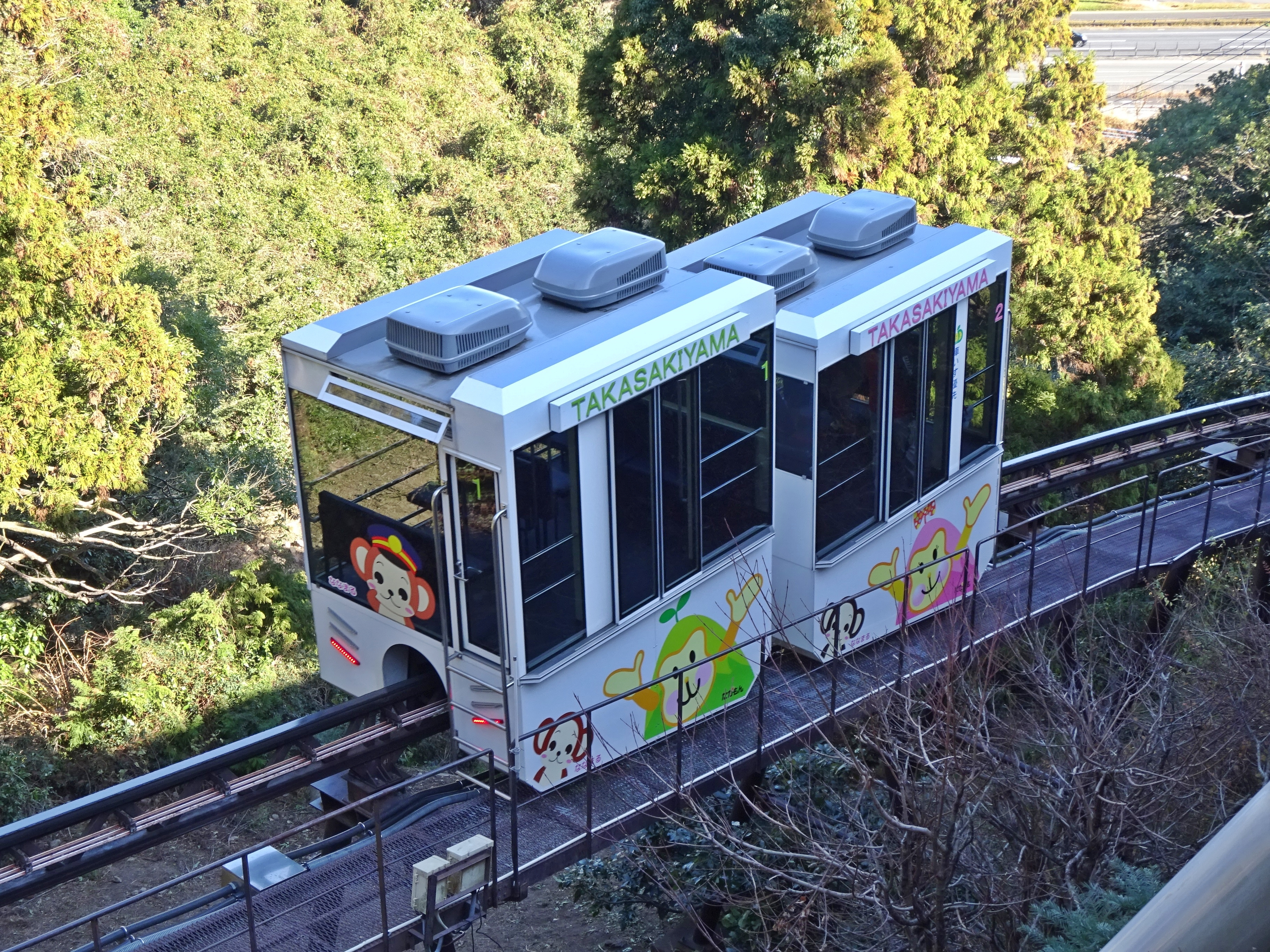
Takasaki Monkey Park's slope car
