= List of cultural properties of Japan – archaeological materials (Ehime) =

This list is of the cultural properties of Japan designated in the category of archaeological materials (考古資料, kōko shiryō) for the Prefecture of Ehime.

== National Cultural Properties ==
As of 1 February 2015, one National Treasure has been designated.

Property	Date	Municipality	Ownership	Comments	Image	Coordinates	Ref.
Excavated Artefacts from Narabarayama Sutra Mound, Iyo Province 伊予国奈良原山経塚出土品; Iyo no uni Narabarayama kyōzuka shutsudo hin	late Heian period	Imabari	Narabara Jinja (奈良原神社) (kept at Tamagawa Museum of Modern Art (玉川近代美術館))	including a bronze hōtō, a bronze sutra container, five bronze mirrors, five bronze bells, an iron bell, a gong, knives, a hairpin, a copper coin, two porcelain dishes, fragments of a vase, an earthenware bowl, and two folding fans		34°01′19″N 132°56′41″E	

== Prefectural Cultural Properties ==
As of 10 December 2014, four properties has been designated at a prefectural level.

Property	Date	Municipality	Ownership	Comments	Image	Coordinates	Ref.
Stone Sutras 石経 sekkyō	late Heian to early Kamakura period	Matsuyama	private	28 stones inscribed front and back with the Lotus Sutra		33°56′51″N 132°47′32″E	
Narrow Bronze Sword 細形銅剣 hosogata dōken		Saijō	Fukuoka Hachiman Jinja (福岡八幡神社)	discovered in 1916		33°53′46″N 133°03′14″E	
Excavated Artefacts from Kanekoyama Kofun 金子山古墳出土品; Kanekoyama kofun shutsudo hin		Niihama	Jingen-ji (慈眼寺)	earrings, two mirrors (one inscribed 口口侯王), swords, magatama, thousands of beads, and haniwa were uncovered in 1950		33°56′51″N 133°16′48″E	
Excavated Artefacts from Kawakami Jinja Kofun 川上神社古墳出土品; Kawakami Jinja kofun shutsudo hin	C6/7	Tōon	Kawakami Jinja (川上神社)	including horse fittings, iron objects, and Sue ware		33°47′59″N 132°54′50″E	

== See also ==
- Cultural Properties of Japan
- List of National Treasures of Japan (archaeological materials)
- List of Historic Sites of Japan (Ehime)
- List of Cultural Properties of Japan - historical materials (Ehime)
