= Index of Japan-related articles (G) =

This page lists Japan-related articles with romanized titles beginning with the letter G. For names of people, please list by surname (i.e., "Tarō Yamada" should be listed under "Y", not "T"). Please also ignore particles (e.g. "a", "an", "the") when listing articles (i.e., "A City with No People" should be listed above "County").

== G ==
- G Gundam
- G-men (magazine)
- G-Saviour

== Ga ==
- Gackt
- Guadalcanal campaign
- Gagaku
- Gaijin
- Gainax
- Gakkō no Kaidan
- Gakushuin
- Galaxy Express 999
- Galcian
- Gallery Fake
- Gamagori, Aichi
- Game Boy
- Game Boy Advance
- Game Boy Camera
- Game Boy Micro
- Game Boy Printer
- GameCube
- Game Freak
- Gamera
- Ganguro
- Ganon / Ganondorf
- Gantzs

== Ge ==
- Gecko
- Gedatsukai
- Geihoku, Hiroshima
- Geino, Mie
- Geinoh Yamashirogumi
- Geisei, Kōchi
- Geisha
- Gekiga
- Gekigangar III
- Genbukan
- Gendai Budō
- Genichi Taguchi
- Genichi Kawakami
- Genji monogatari (opera)
- Genjo Sanzo
- Genkai, Saga
- Genmaicha
- Genpei War
- Genrō
- Gensomaden Saiyuki
- Gentō Sokuchū
- Geography of Japan
- Gero, Gifu
- The Gerogerigegege
- Geta (footwear)

== Gh ==
- Ghidorah, the Three-Headed Monster
- Ghost in the Shell
- Ghost in the Shell 2: Innocence
- Ghost in the Shell: Stand Alone Complex
- Ghouls 'n Ghosts

== Gi ==
- Gichin Funakoshi
- Gifu Castle
- Gifu Great Buddha
- Gifu Prefecture
- Gifu, Gifu
- Giko Cat
- Ginan, Gifu
- Ginkgo biloba
- Ginowan, Okinawa
- Ginoza, Okinawa
- Ginza

== Gl ==
- Glay
- Glitch City
- Glossary of Japanese Buddhism
- Glossary of Japanese history
- Glossary of Japanese swords
- Glutinous rice

== Go ==
- Go (2001 film)
- Go (board game)
- Go players
- Go professional
- Go proverb
- Go Seigen
- Go strategy and tactics
- Go terms
- Gobō
- Gobo, Wakayama
- Godzilla
- Godzilla (1954)
- Godzilla Raids Again
- Godzilla vs. Biollante
- Godzilla vs. Gigan
- Godzilla vs. Hedorah
- Godzilla vs. Mechagodzilla
- Godzilla vs. Mothra
- Godzilla vs. the Sea Monster
- Godzilla vs The Thing
- Godzilla, King of the Monsters!
- Godzilla's Revenge
- Gohoku, Kochi
- Gojo, Nara
- Gojūon
- Gojū Ryū
- Goka, Shimane
- Gokase, Miyazaki
- Gokasho, Shiga
- Gokenin
- Gokinjo Monogatari
- Gokoku-ji
- Gokoku-ji (Okinawa)
- Gokoku Shrines
- Goku Junior
- Golden Light Sutra
- Golden Week (Japan)
- Gomashio
- Gomoku
- Goroawase
- Goseibai Shikimoku
- Gosen, Niigata
- Goshiki, Hyogo
- Heinosuke Gosho
- Goshogawara, Aomori
- Goshoura, Kumamoto
- Gospellers
- Gotanda Station
- Gotenba, Shizuoka
- Gotenks
- Gothic Lolita
- Gotō Islands
- Gotsu, Shimane

== Gr ==
- Gradius
- The Grand Line
- Grave of the Fireflies
- Gravitation (anime)
- Great Hanshin earthquake
- Great Kantō earthquake
- Great Teacher Onizuka
- Greater East Asia War
- Greater East Asia War in the Pacific
- Greater Tokyo Area
- Green tea
- Greenery Day
- Ground zero

== Gu ==
- Guan Yin
- Guandong army
- Guile (video game character)
- Guineapig films
- Gujo, Gifu
- Gundam
- Gundam - The 08th MS Team
- Gundam 0080
- Gundam 0083
- Gundam F-91
- Gundam Seed
- Gundam Wing
- Gundam Wing - Endless Waltz
- Gundam X
- Gungrave
- Gunma Prefecture
- Gushikami, Okinawa
- Gushikawa Castle (Itoman)
- Gushikawa, Okinawa
- Gusukube, Okinawa

== Gy ==
- Gyaru-moji
- Gyoda, Saitama
- Gyōki
- Gyokuon-hōsō
- Gyokuro
- Gyokusen-ji
- Gyokusen-ji (Tsuruoka)
- Gyokuto, Kumamoto
- Gyoza
- Gyūdon
