= Index of Japan-related articles (Q–R) =

This page lists Japan-related articles with romanized titles beginning with the letters Q–R. For names of people, please list by surname (i.e., "Tarō Yamada" should be listed under "Y", not "T"). Please also ignore particles (e.g. "a", "an", "the") when listing articles (i.e., "A City with No People" should be listed under "City").

== Q ==
- Qi
- Qoo
- Quarterstaff
- The Queen's Classroom

== R ==
- R-Type
- Rakuto Kasei
- Refugees International Japan
- Central Research Institute of Electric Power Industry

== Ra ==
- Rabaul
- Radar Scope
- Radical (Chinese character)
- Radical Dreamers: Nusumenai Hōseki
- Marimo Ragawa
- Raichō
- Raichu
- Raiden
- Raijū
- Railway Construction Act
- Railway Nationalization Act
- Rainbow Bridge (Tokyo)
- Rainbow Islands: The Story of Bubble Bobble 2
- Raku ware
- Rakugo
- Ramen
- Shin-Yokohama Raumen Museum
- Ran (film)
- Randori
- Ranma ½
- Rapi:t
- Rashomon
- Rashomon (film)
- Rashomon (short story)
- Rashōmon
- Rattata
- Amuro Ray

== Re ==
- Read or Die
- Read or Die: The TV
- Record of Lodoss War
- Recreation and Amusement Association
- Recruit (company)
- Red Beard
- Red seal ships
- Regions of Japan
- Regular script
- Reihoku, Kumamoto
- Reiki
- Reiyūkai
- Religion in Japan
- Ren'ai CHU!
- Renga
- Renju
- Renku
- Rennyo
- Renshi
- Rensho
- Republic of Ezo
- Resident Evil (series)
- Resona Holdings
- Respect for the Aged Day
- Reversi
- Revolutionary Girl Utena
- Rez

== Ri ==
- Rice cooker
- Rice vinegar
- Richard Sorge
- Ricoh
- Ricoh Caplio RX
- Rie Tanaka
- Rikki
- Rikuchū Province
- Rikuzen Province
- Rikuzentakata, Iwate
- Ring (film)
- Rinzai school
- Risshō Kōsei Kai
- Ritsu school
- Ritsumeikan University
- Rittō, Shiga
- Rival Schools
- River City Ransom

== Ro ==
- Robotech
- Rodan
- Rōjū
- Roketsuzome (also: Rozome)
- Rokudan
- Rokuharamitsu-ji
- Rokuhara Tandai
- Rokurokubi
- Roland Corporation
- Romanization
- Romanization of Japanese
- Ronin
- Ronin (film)
- Bondage rope harness
- Roppongi
- Roppongi Hills
- Roy (Fire Emblem)
- Royal Space Force: The Wings of Honneamise

== Ru ==
- Rubeshibe, Hokkaidō
- Ruby (programming language)
- Ruby character
- Rulers of Japan
- Rumiko Takahashi
- Rumoi, Hokkaidō
- Rumoi Subprefecture
- Ruri Hoshino
- Rurouni Kenshin
- Russo-Japanese War
- Ruth Benedict

== Ry ==
- Ryōji Noyori
- Ryoju Kikuchi
- Ryōkan
- Ryokan (Japanese inn)
- Ryoko Tani
- Ryōnan, Kagawa
- Ryotsu, Niigata
- Ryu (Street Fighter)
- Ryū (school)
- Ryu Hayabusa
- Ryūgasaki, Ibaraki
- Ryugatake, Kumamoto
- Ryuhoku, Kumamoto
- Ryuichi Abe
- Ryuichi Sakamoto
- Ryujin, Wakayama
- Ryukoku University
- Ryukyu Islands
- Ryūkyū Kingdom
- Ryukyuan languages
- Ryukyuan songs
- Ryukyu robin
- Ryūyō, Shizuoka
