= List of places of scenic beauty of Japan (Yamagata) =

This list is of the places of scenic beauty of Japan located within the Prefecture of Yamagata.

== National Places of Scenic Beauty ==
As of 1 January 2020, eight Places have been designated at a national level; Landscape of Oku no Hosomichi is a serial designation spanning twelve prefectures.

Site	Municipality	Comments	Image	Coordinates	Type	Ref.
Gyokusen-ji Gardens 玉川寺庭園; Gyokusenji teien	Tsuruoka			38°42′40″N 139°56′27″E	1	
Mount Kinpō 金峰山; Kinpō-zan	Tsuruoka			38°40′29″N 139°47′47″E	10, 11	
Yama-dera 山寺; Yamadera	Yamagata	also an Historic Site		38°18′50″N 140°26′06″E	10	
Sakai clan gardens 酒井氏庭園; Sakai-shi teien	Tsuruoka			38°43′43″N 139°49′17″E	1	
Ōnuma no Ukishima 大沼の浮島; Ōnuma no Ukishima	Asahi			38°19′57″N 140°06′44″E	7	
Kakubu-en (Honma Family Detached Residence Gardens) 本間氏別邸庭園 (鶴舞園); Honma-shi bettei teien (Kakubu-en)	Sakata			38°55′24″N 139°50′32″E	1	
Sōkō-ji Gardens 總光寺庭園; Sōkōji teien	Sakata			38°51′38″N 139°58′13″E	1	
Landscape of Oku no Hosomichi; Misaki (Daishizaki) - Motoaikai おくのほそ道の風景地 三崎（大師崎）・本合海; Oku no Hosomichi no fūkei-chi Misaki (Daishizaki)・Motoaikai	Shinjō, Yuza	designation spans twelve prefectures		38°43′37″N 140°13′33″E		

== Prefectural Places of Scenic Beauty ==
As of 1 May 2019, two Places have been designated at a prefectural level.

Site	Municipality	Comments	Image	Coordinates	Type	Ref.
Mount Maya 摩耶山; Maya-san	Tsuruoka			38°31′13″N 139°43′42″E		
Nakano Hanshirō Family Gardens 仲野半四郎氏庭園; Nakano Hanshirō-shi teien	Tendō			38°20′59″N 140°22′18″E		

== Municipal Places of Scenic Beauty ==
As of 1 May 2019, ten Places have been designated at a municipal level, including:

Site	Municipality	Comments	Image	Coordinates	Type	Ref.
Kōzen-ji Gardens 光禅寺庭園; Kōzenji-teien	Yamagata			38°14′20″N 140°20′07″E		
Godai-in Bell 五大院の時鐘; Godai-in no tokigane	Sakata					
Kaikō-ji 海向寺; Kaikōji	Sakata			38°55′09″N 139°49′50″E		
Hikarigaoka Pine Forest 光ケ丘松林; Hikarigaoka matsu-bayashi	Sakata			38°56′01″N 139°49′38″E		
Hiyoriyama Park 日和山公園; Hiyoriyama kōen	Sakata			38°55′09″N 139°49′41″E		

== See also ==
- Cultural Properties of Japan
- List of Historic Sites of Japan (Yamagata)
- List of parks and gardens of Yamagata Prefecture
