= Ōnuma no Ukishima =

Marsh in Asahi, Yamagata, Japan

- 大沼の浮島
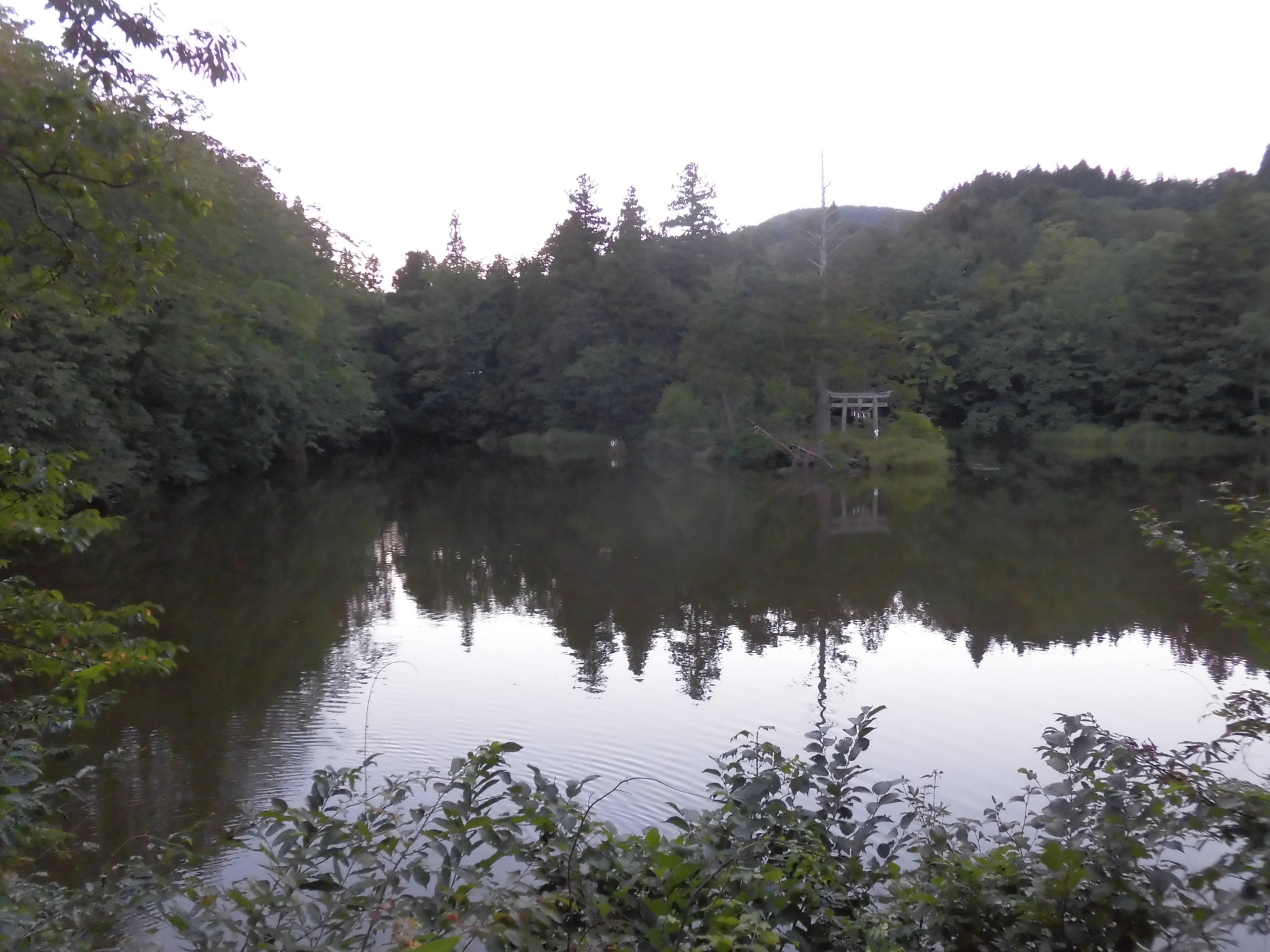
- Ōnuma no Ukishima

- Location within Yamagata Prefecture Location within Japan
- Type: Marsh
- Location: Asahi, Yamagata, Japan
- Coordinates: 38°19′57″N 140°06′44″E
- Status: Open
- National Palace of Scenic Beauty

The Ōnuma no Ukishima (大沼の浮島) is a marsh located in the town of Asahi, Yamagata Prefecture, Japan, which is a nationally designated Place of Scenic Beauty.

== Overview ==
The marsh is located in a wooded area and contains a large pond, which is noted for having over 60 floating islands of various sizes. The phenomena was first recorded in accounts dating from 681 AD, and in the Heian period the area was sacred to the Shugendō mountain cults, who used then positions of the islands is a form of divination. The priests at the pond were consulted by Minamoto no Yoritomo and the practice continued well into the Edo Period. It was proclaimed a National Place of Scenic Beauty in 1925.

== See also ==
- List of Places of Scenic Beauty of Japan (Yamagata)
