= Kinbō Shrine =

Shinto shrine in Tsuruoka, Yamagata, Japan

Kinbō Jinja 金峯神社
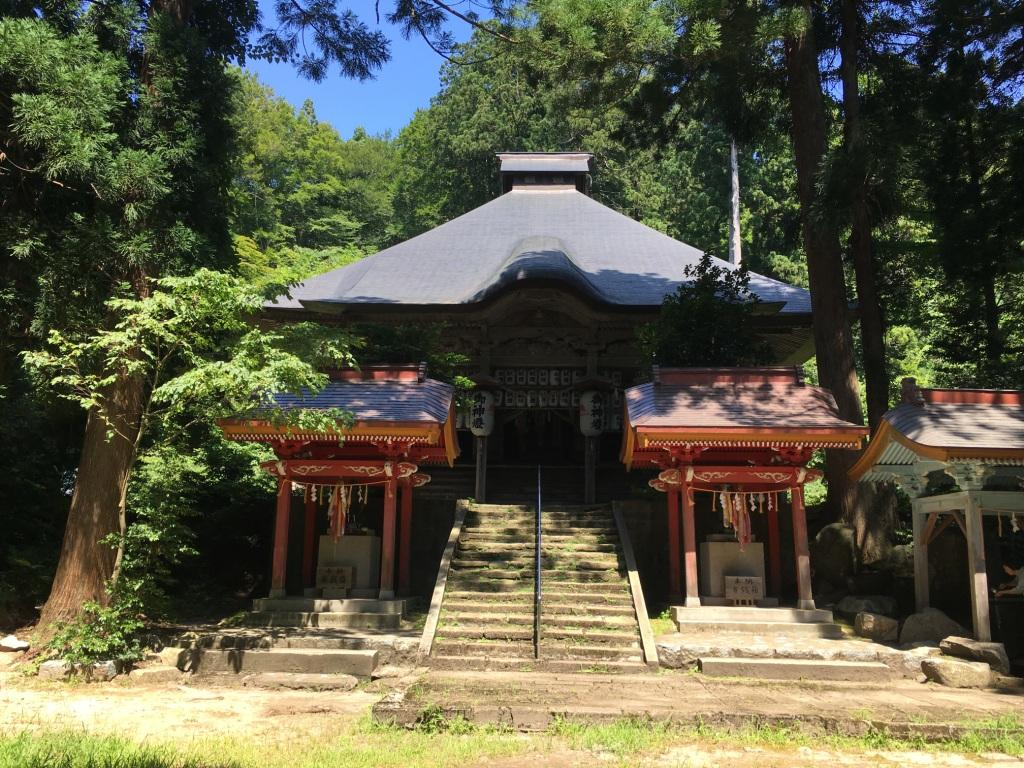
- Haiden of Kinbō Jinja

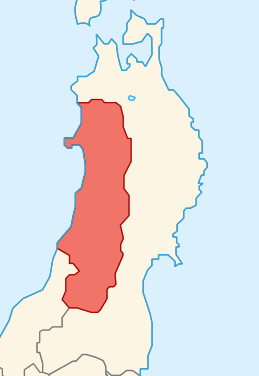
- Kinbō Jinja Kinbō Shrine (Dewa, Japan) Kinbō Shrine (Japan)

Religion
- Affiliation: Shinto
- Deity: Sukunabikona, Ōkuninushi, Kotoshironushi, Emperor Ankan
- Festival: June 15

Location
- Location: Tsuruoka, Yamagata
- Coordinates: 38°40′43.87″N 139°48′19.99″E

Architecture
- Established: early-Heian period

Website
- www.kinbou.net

Kinbō Shrine (金峯神社, Kinbō Jinja) is a Shinto shrine located in the city of Tsuruoka, Yamagata Prefecture, Japan. A former prefectural shrine under the Modern system of ranked Shinto shrines, the entire summit of Mount Kinbō behind the shrine is regarded as its honden. The mountain is designated as a National Place of Scenic Beauty. The shrine's main festival is held annually on June 15.

== History ==
The original construction of this shrine is unknown, but it is said by shrine records to have been established in the Daidō era (806-810 AD), although other shrine records indicate that it was established in the Jōryaku era (990-995 AD) as a subsidiary of the Kinpusen Jinja in Yoshino in Yamato Province. It was a place of worship for the Northern Fujiwara of Hiraizumi during the late Heian period. Under the Shinbutsu-shūgō of the pre-modern era, it was regarded as a Shingon temple and was a training center for the Shugendō Yamabushi, and was supported by Shōnai Domain during the Edo period. In 1870, after the separation of Shinto and Buddhism, it became a "Mitake Shrine". It was renamed Kinbō Jinja in 1877.

The shrine's Heiden has been designated a National Important Cultural Property.This structure has an inscription on one of its beams indicating that it was remodeled by Mogami Yoshimitsu in 1608, indicating that it pre-dates the start of the Edo period. It has a unique style, similar to that of a chapel found at Japanese Zen temples with a high roof and Chinese-style gable over its entrance.

== See also ==
- List of Shinto shrines
- List of Places of Scenic Beauty of Japan (Yamagata)
