= Index of Japan-related articles (N) =

This page lists Japan-related articles with romanized titles beginning with the letter N. For names of people, please list by surname (i.e., "Tarō Yamada" should be listed under "Y", not "T"). Please also ignore particles (e.g. "a", "an", "the") when listing articles (i.e., "A City with No People" should be listed under "City").

== Na ==
- Nabari, Mie
- Nabemono
- Nachikatsuura, Wakayama
- Nadasaki, Okayama
- Nadia: The Secret of Blue Water
- Naga District, Mie
- Naga District, Wakayama
- Naga, Wakayama
- Nagahama, Ehime
- Nagahama, Shiga
- Nagai, Yamagata
- Go Nagai
- Nagai Kafu
- Nagaizumi, Shizuoka
- Nagako
- Nagakura Shinpachi
- Nagakute, Aichi
- Nagano, Nagano
- Nagano Prefecture
- Nagano Shinkansen
- Nagaoka, Niigata
- Nagaoka District, Kōchi
- Nagaokakyō
- Nagaokakyō, Kyoto
- Nagareyama, Chiba
- Nagasaki Prefecture
- Nagasaki, Nagasaki
- Masahiko Nagasawa
- Miki Nagasawa
- Masatoshi Nagase
- Nagashima
- Nagashima, Kagoshima
- Nagashima Island, Kagoshima
- Nagashima, Mie
- Shigeo Nagashima
- Nagashino Castle
- Nagasu, Kumamoto
- Nagatachō, Tokyo
- Nagato, Yamaguchi
- Nagato Province
- Nagatsuka Takashi
- Yōko Nagayama
- Nagi, Okayama
- Naginata
- Naginatajutsu
- Nago, Okinawa
- Nagoya
- Nagoya Airport
- Nagoya Castle
- Nagoya Grampus Eight
- Nagoya Line (Kintetsu)
- Nagoya Station
- Nagoya, Saga
- Chuichi Nagumo
- Naha, Okinawa
- Nahari, Kōchi
- Nairan
- Naito Torajiro
- Naka, Hyogo
- Naka District, Shimane
- Naka District, Tokushima
- Yuji Naka
- Nakabaru, Saga
- Nakae Chomin
- Nakagami District, Okinawa
- Nakagawa, Tokushima
- Nakagawa Hidemasa
- Nakagawa, Fukuoka
- Nakagusuku Bay
- Nakagusuku, Okinawa
- Nakahama Manjiro
- Chūya Nakahara
- Nakahechi, Wakayama
- Nakajima, Ehime
- Nakajima, Fukushima
- Nakajima, Ishikawa
- Nakajima Aircraft Company
- Nakajima Atsushi
- Nakajima B5N
- Nakajima B6N
- Nakajima G10N
- Nakajima Ki-115
- Nakajima Ki-116
- Nakajima Ki-201
- Nakajima Ki-43
- Nakajima Kikka
- Nakakawane, Shizuoka
- Nakama, Fukuoka
- Yoshiro Nakamatsu
- Nakamichi
- Suzuka Nakamoto
- Nakamura, Kochi
- Masato Nakamura
- Nakane Chie
- Hiroyuki Nakano
- Nakano Station (Tokyo)
- Nakano, Nagano
- Nakano, Tokyo
- Nakasendō
- Nakashima District, Aichi
- Yasuhiro Nakasone
- Hideo Nakata
- Hidetoshi Nakata
- Nakatado District, Kagawa
- Nakatane, Kagoshima
- Nakatosa, Kōchi
- Nakatsu, Ōita
- Nakatsu, Wakayama
- Nakatsu Station (Hankyu)
- Nakatsu Station (Osaka Municipal Subway)
- Nakatsue, Ōita
- Nakatsugaru District, Aomori
- Nakatsugawa, Gifu
- Nakatsukasa
- Nakayama, Ehime
- Nakayama, Tottori
- Nakayama, Yamagata
- Nakayama-dera
- Nakijin, Okinawa
- Nakiri bocho
- Namba
- Namba Station
- Namboku Line (Osaka)
- Namboku Line (Kobe)
- Namboku Line (Sapporo)
- Namboku Line
- Chūhei Nambu
- NAMC YS-11
- Namco
- Namek
- Namerikawa, Toyama
- Namie Amuro
- Namikata, Ehime
- Namino, Kumamoto
- Nanakusa-no-sekku
- Nanao, Ishikawa
- Nanayama, Saga
- Nanboku-chō period
- Nandan, Hyogo
- Nangō, Miyagi
- Nangō, Miyazaki (Higashiusuki)
- Nangō, Miyazaki (Minaminaka)
- Naniwa-ku, Osaka
- Nanjō
- Nanjo Bunyu
- Nanjō District, Fukui
- Nankai Electric Railway
- Nankan, Kumamoto
- Nanking Massacre
- Nanko, Hyogo
- Nankoku, Kōchi
- Nansei, Mie
- Nanto, Mie
- Nanto Rokushū
- Nanto Shichi Daiji
- Nanto, Toyama
- Nan'yō, Yamagata
- Naokawa, Ōita
- Naoiri, Ōita
- Naoiri District, Ōita
- Naoshima, Kagawa
- Nara, Nara
- Nara Line (Kintetsu)
- Nara period
- Nara Prefecture
- Naraku
- Narashino, Chiba
- Narita International Airport
- Narita, Chiba
- Narita-san
- Naritasan Kurume Bunin
- Nariwa, Okayama
- Naruhito
- Naruko, Miyagi
- Naruto
- Naruto jutsu
- Naruto, Tokushima
- National (brand)
- National Defense Academy of Japan
- National Diet Library
- National Police Agency
- National Public Safety Commission
- Natori, Miyagi
- Natsume Sōseki
- Nattō
- Nausicaä of the Valley of the Wind (film)
- Nausicaä of the Valley of the Wind (manga)
- Nawa, Tottori
- Nayoro, Hokkaidō
- Naze Nani Nadesico
- Naze, Kagoshima

== Ne ==
- NEC
- NEC Earth Simulator
- Negima!: Magister Negi Magi
- Nejime, Kagoshima
- Nekketsu Kōha Kunio-kun
- Nemophila
- Nemuro, Hokkaidō
- Nemuro Peninsula
- Nemuro Strait
- Nemuro Subprefecture
- Neo Geo (console)
- Neo Geo CD
- Neo Geo Pocket
- Neo Geo Pocket Color
- Neon Genesis Evangelion
- Nerima, Tokyo
- NES 2
- Netsuke
- New Beginning
- New Central Airlines
- New Chitose Airport
- New Frontier Party
- New Komeito Party
- New Conservative Party
- New Party Sakigake
- New Zealand Story
- Newtype
- Michiko Neya
- Neyagawa, Osaka
- NHK

== Ni ==
- Niboshi
- Nichihara, Shimane
- Nichinan, Miyazaki
- Nichinan, Tottori
- Nichiren
- Nichiren Buddhism
- Nichiren Shōshū
- Nichiren-shū
- Nigatsu-dō
- Nights into Dreams...
- Nihon Keizai Shimbun
- Nihon-shiki Rōmaji
- Nihonmatsu, Fukushima
- Nihon Ki-in
- Nihon Shoki
- Nihon University
- Niigata Prefecture
- Niigata University
- Niigata, Niigata
- Niihama, Ehime
- Niimi Nankichi
- Niimi, Okayama
- Niitsu, Niigata
- Niiza, Saitama
- Nijō Castle
- Nijō, Fukuoka
- Miho Nikaido
- Nikkatsu
- Nikkei 225
- Nikkō, Tochigi
- Nikkō (priest)
- Nikolai of Japan
- Nikon
- Nikon F
- Nima District, Shimane
- Nima, Shimane
- Ningen-sengen
- Ninja
- Ninja Gaiden
- Ninja in popular culture
- Ninjaken
- Ninjutsu
- Ninohe, Iwate
- Ninomiya Sontoku
- Ninomiya, Kanagawa
- Ninomiya, Tochigi
- Ninshō
- Nintendo
- Nintendo 64
- Nintendo DS
- Nintendo Entertainment System
- Nintendo Family Computer
- Nintendo Seal of Quality
- Nintendo Virtual Boy
- Nio
- Nio, Kagawa
- Nippon Budokan
- Nippon Cargo Airlines
- Nippon Professional Baseball
- Nippon Sei Ko Kai
- Nippon Telegraph and Telephone
- Nippon Television
- Nippon Yusen
- Nipponbashi
- Nipponzan-Myōhōji-Daisanga
- Nirasaki, Yamanashi
- Nirayama, Shizuoka
- Nisei
- Nishi-tokyo, Tokyo
- Nishiarita, Saga
- Nishiawakura, Okayama
- Nishiazai, Shiga
- Nishibiwajima, Aichi
- Nishida Kitaro
- Nishigoshi, Kumamoto
- Nishihara, Kumamoto
- Nishihara, Okinawa
- Nishiharu, Aichi
- Nishi Hongan-ji
- Nishiiyayama, Tokushima
- Nishiizu, Shizuoka
- Nishikamo District, Aichi
- Nishikasugai District, Aichi
- Miwa Nishikawa
- Takahiro Nishikawa
- Takanori Nishikawa
- Nishiki, Akita
- Nishiki, Kumamoto
- Nishiki, Yamaguchi
- Nishiki-e
- Nishikunisaki District, Ōita
- Nishimatsuura District, Saga
- Nishimera, Miyazaki
- Nishimorokata District, Miyazaki
- Hiroyuki Nishimura
- Nishimuro District, Wakayama
- Nishinippon Shimbun
- Nishinomiya, Hyogo
- Nishinoomote, Kagoshima
- Nishinoshima, Shimane
- Nishio, Aichi
- Ishin Nishio
- Satoru Nishita
- Nishitama, Tokyo
- Nishitosa, Kochi
- Nishiumi, Ehime
- Nishiusuki District, Miyazaki
- Nishiuwa District, Ehime
- Nishiwaki, Hyogo
- Nishiyoshino, Nara
- Nismo
- Nissan
- Nissan 200SX
- Nissan Fairlady
- Nissan Frontier
- Nissan Maxima
- Nissan Mutual Life Insurance
- Nissan Pathfinder
- Nissan S30
- Nissan Skyline GT-R
- Nissan Z-car
- Nisshin, Aichi
- Nissin Foods
- Nita District, Shimane
- Nita, Shimane
- Nitto Records
- Niwa District, Aichi
- Niyodo, Kōchi

== No ==
- Nobeoka, Miyazaki
- Noboribetsu, Hokkaidō
- Noda Castle
- Junko Noda
- Noda, Kagoshima
- Noda, Chiba
- Nodachi
- Nodagawa, Kyoto
- Nōgata, Fukuoka
- Nogi District, Shimane
- Hideyo Noguchi
- Isamu Noguchi
- Noguchi Museum
- Noh
- Noichi, Kōchi
- Noir (anime)
- Nojiri, Miyazaki
- Nokami, Wakayama
- Nōmi, Hiroshima
- Hideo Nomo
- Nomura Group
- Yoshitaro Nomura
- Nomura, Ehime
- Kokona Nonaka
- Nonogram
- North Korean abductions of Japanese
- Northern Fujiwara
- Nori
- Noriko Hidaka
- Nose, Osaka
- Nosegawa, Nara
- Noshiro, Akita
- Noto Peninsula
- Noto Province
- Notogawa, Shiga
- Notsu, Ōita
- Notsuharu, Ōita
- Nozomi (probe)
- Nozomi (train)
- Nozomi Witches

== Nt ==
- NTT DoCoMo

== Nu ==
- Nue
- Nukata District, Aichi
- Nukata, Aichi
- Nukekubi
- Numakuma District, Hiroshima
- Numakuma, Hiroshima
- Numata, Gunma
- Numazu, Shizuoka
- Nunchaku

== Ny ==
- Nyoi-bo
- Nyorai
- Nyūkawa, Gifu
