= Sōkō-ji =

Buddhist temple in Sakata, Yamagata, Japan

- 總光寺
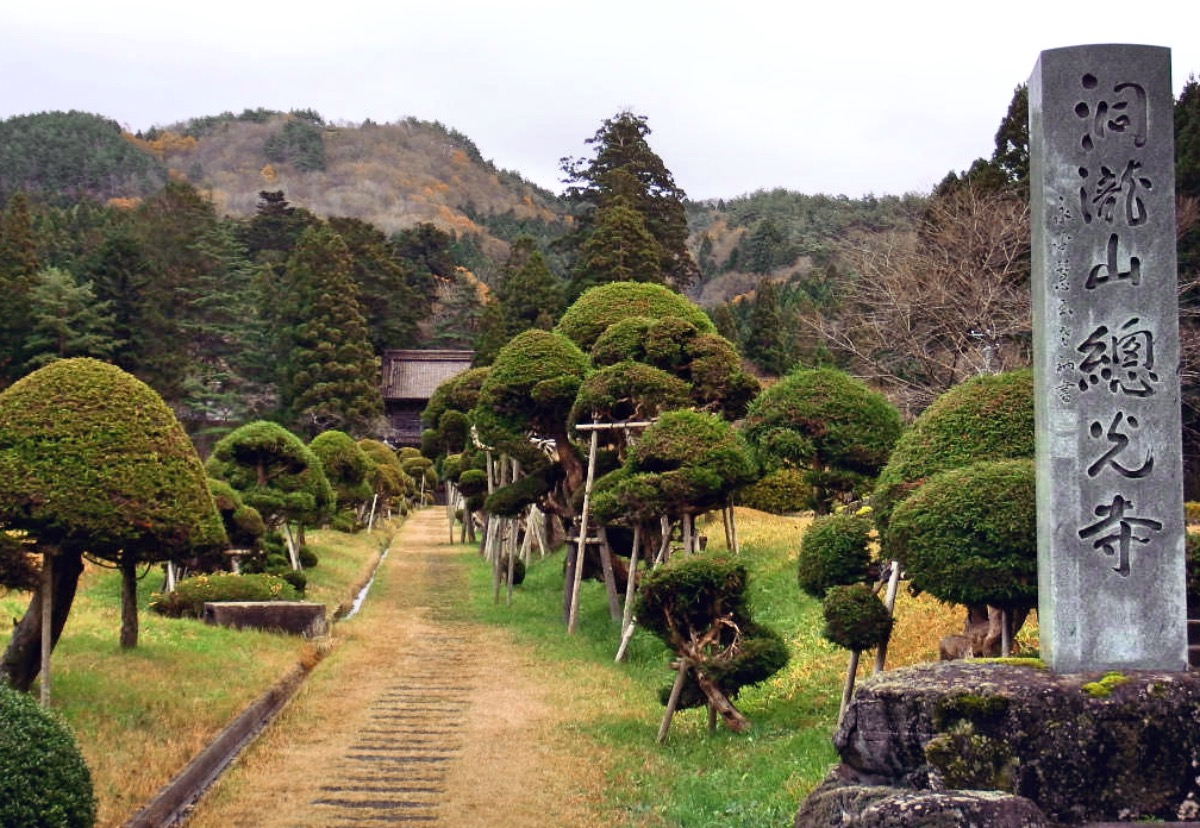
- Soko-ji Entry

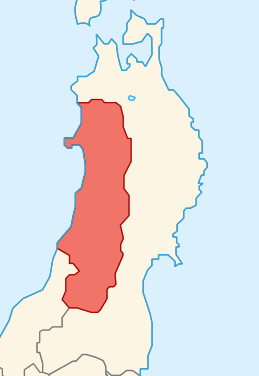
- Sōkō-ji Sōkō-ji (Dewa, Japan) Sōkō-ji (Japan)

Religion
- Affiliation: Buddhism
- Deity: Sho-Kannon
- Rite: Sōtō school of Japanese Zen

Location
- Location: 8 Sōkōjizawa, Sakata-shi, Yamagata-ken 999-6831
- Country: Japan
- Coordinates: 38°51′38″N 139°58′13″E

Architecture
- Completed: 1384

Website
- www.sokoji-sakata.com

Sōkō-ji (總光寺), is a Buddhist temple belonging to the Sōtō school of Japanese Zen located in the city of Sakata, Yamagata Prefecture, Japan. Its main image is a statue of Sho-Kannon bosatsu. The Japanese garden at this temple was designated a National Place of Scenic Beauty in 1996.

== History ==
Sōkō-ji was founded in 1384 by Getsuan Ryoen (1348-1425), under the sponsorship of local warlord Satō Masanobu, a descendant of the famed warrior Satō Tsugunobu, who was killed at the Battle of Yashima while defending Minamoto no Yoshitsune. The temple gate was completed in 1811. The temple served as the bodaiji of the successive daimyō of Dewa-Matsuyama Domain, a subsidiary domain of Shōnai Domain.

The temple garden was reconstructed in 1756 in the style of Kobori Enshū after most of the temple was destroyed in a fire. Also of note at the temple is a row of 120 cryptomeria trees lining the entry to the temple, which are trimmed in a form of topiary art to resemble mushrooms. These trees are over 400 years old, and are a Yamagata Prefectural Natural Monument.

The temple is located ten minutes by car from Amarume Station on the JR East Uetsu Main Line.

== See also ==
- List of Places of Scenic Beauty of Japan (Yamagata)
