= Gyokusen-ji (Tsuruoka) =

Buddhist temple in Tsuruoka, Yamagata, Japan

- 玉川寺
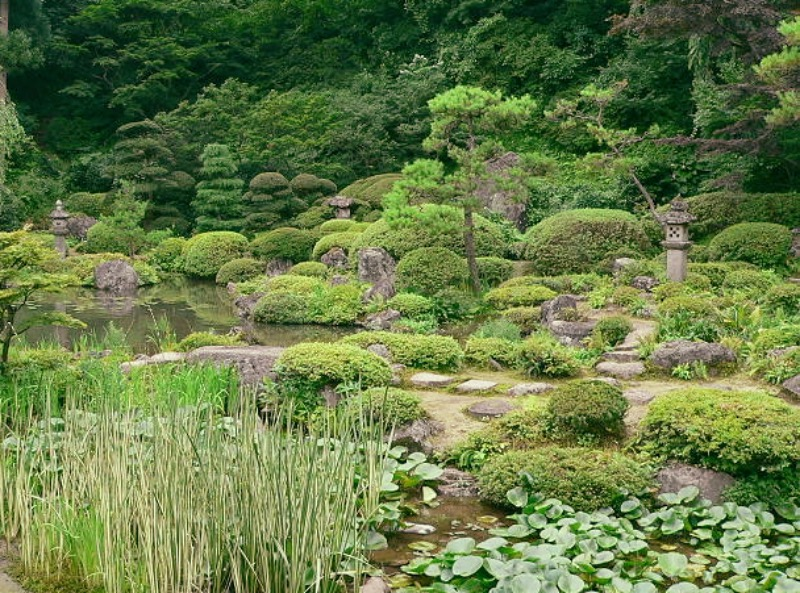
- Tsuruoka Gyokusen-ji garden

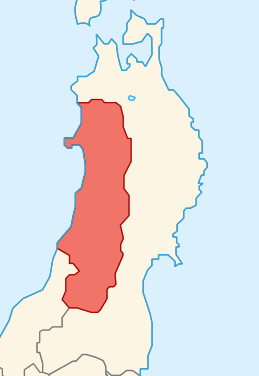
- Gyokusen-ji Gyokusen-ji (Tsuruoka) (Dewa, Japan) Gyokusen-ji (Tsuruoka) (Japan)

Religion
- Affiliation: Buddhism
- Deity: Sho-Kannon
- Rite: Sōtō school of Japanese Zen

Location
- Location: 35 Haguro-Tamagawa, Tsuruoka-shi, Yamagata-ken 997-0121
- Country: Japan
- Coordinates: 38°42′40″N 139°56′27″E

Architecture
- Completed: 1251

Website
- www.gyokusenji.or.jp/gaiyo/

Gyokusen-ji (玉川寺), is a Buddhist temple belonging to the Sōtō school of Japanese Zen located in the city of Tsuruoka, Yamagata Prefecture, Japan. Its main image is a statue of Sho-Kannon bosatsu. The Japanese garden at this temple was designated a National Place of Scenic Beauty in 1987.

== History ==
Gyokusen-ji was founded in 1251 by Ryoken Homei, a priest from Korea who had studied at Kinzan-ji in Hangzhou, China, and who had been accepted as a disciple by Dōgen at Eihei-ji upon coming to Japan. It fell into disrepair and was restored by the Murakami clan of Echigo Province in 1453.

The temple garden dates from the 1453 reconstruction, but was extensively renovated in subsequent centuries and its current form is believed to date from around the 1650s. It is locate dot the east of the main temple buildings, and contains a waterfall and large pond, and many ornamental stones.

The temple is located twenty minutes by car from Tsuruoka Station.

== See also ==
- List of Places of Scenic Beauty of Japan (Yamagata)
