= Index of Japan-related articles (U–V) =

This page lists Japan-related articles with romanized titles beginning with the letters U and V. For names of people, please list by surname (i.e., "Tarō Yamada" should be listed under "Y", not "T"). Please also ignore particles (e.g. "a", "an", "the") when listing articles (i.e., "A City with No People" should be listed under "City").

== Ub–Ud ==
- Ube, Yamaguchi
- Ubuyama, Kumamoto
- Uchi-deshi
- Uchiko, Ehime
- Uchimizu
- Uchimura Kanzō
- Uchinomi, Kagawa
- Uchinoura, Kagoshima
- Uchita, Wakayama
- Uchiumi, Ehime
- Uda District, Nara
- Udon
- Udon kiri
- Udono, Mie

== Ue–Uj ==
- Uechi-ryū
- Ueda, Nagano (former city)
- Ueda, Nagano (new city)
- Ueda Akinari
- Bin Ueda
- Makoto Ueda (architecture critic)
- Makoto Ueda (poetry critic)
- Yūji Ueda
- Ueki, Kumamoto
- Kazuhide Uekusa
- Nobuo Uematsu
- Ueno, Gunma
- Ueno, Okinawa
- Ueno, Mie
- Ueno, Tokyo
- Ueno Station
- Morihei Ueshiba
- Moriteru Ueshiba
- Uesugi Kenshin
- Ugajin
- Kazushige Ugaki
- Ugo Province
- Uirō
- Uji
- Ujitawara

== Uk–Ul ==
- Ukan
- Uke (martial arts)
- Uken
- Ukichiro Nakaya
- Ukiha District, Fukuoka
- Ukiha, Fukuoka
- Ukiyo-e
- Ukyō-ku, Kyoto
- Ultimate Muscle
- Ultra Games
- Ultraman
- Ulysses 31

== Um–Uo ==
- Uma District, Ehime
- Umaji, Kōchi
- Umami
- Ume
- Ume, Ōita
- Umeda
- Mochio Umeda
- Umeda Station
- Kazuo Umezu
- Umi, Fukuoka
- Unagisaki hōchō
- Uncanny valley
- Underground (Murakami book)
- Unit 731
- United Nations University
- United States Forces Japan
- Universal Century
- University of Tokyo
- Unkei
- Unno Juza
- Sōsuke Uno
- Unseen world
- Uoshima, Ehime
- Uozu, Toyama

== Ur ==
- Uraga Channel
- Urashima Tarō
- Urasoe, Okinawa
- Urawa, Saitama
- Urawa Red Diamonds
- Urayasu
- Ureshino, Mie
- Ureshino, Saga
- Urokotori
- Urusei Yatsura
- Usa District, Ōita
- Usa, Ōita
- Usagi Tsukino
- Usagi Yojimbo
- Ushibuka, Kumamoto
- Ushiku, Ibaraki
- Ushimado, Okayama
- Ushizu, Saga
- USS Greeneville (SSN-772)
- Usu (mortar)
- Usui Mikao
- Usui, Fukuoka
- Usuki, Ōita

== Us–Uz ==
- Usa Jingū
- Ushiku Daibutsu
- Ushiku, Ibaraki
- Uta-garuta
- Hikaru Utada
- Utagawa Hiroshige
- Utagawa school
- Utamakura
- Utamakura (Utamaro)
- Utamaro
- Utano, Nara
- Utashinai, Hokkaidō
- Utazu
- UTF-2000
- Uto District, Kumamoto
- Uto, Kumamoto
- Utsunomiya
- Uub (Dragon Ball)
- Uwa, Ehime
- Uwajima, Ehime
- Uzen Province

== V ==
- Vagabond (manga)
- Vaio
- Vajrayana
- Vandread
- Vegalta Sendai
- Vegeta
- Vegeta Saga
- VHS
- Villages of Japan
- Video Girl Ai
- Virtua Fighter
- Visas and Virtue
- The Vision of Escaflowne
- Vissel Kobe
- Visual kei
- Vocaloid
- Voice acting in Japan
- Voices of a Distant Star
