= Index of Japan-related articles (C) =

This page lists Japan-related articles with romanized titles beginning with the letter C. For names of people, please list by surname (i.e., "Tarō Yamada" should be listed under "Y", not "T"). Please also ignore particles (e.g. "a", "an", "the") when listing articles (i.e., "A City with No People" should be listed under "City").

== C ==
- C-HTML

== Ca ==
- Cabinet of Japan
- Calpis
- Canon (company)
- Capcom
- Capital of Japan
- Capsule hotel
- Captain Tsubasa
- Cardcaptor Sakura
- Casio
- Castle in the Sky
- The Castle of Cagliostro
- Castle town
- Castlevania
- Catgirl

== Ce ==
- Celestial Legend Ceres
- Cell (dragonball)
- Cell Games
- Central Japan Railway Company
- Central League
- Central Research Institute of Electric Power Industry

== Ch ==
- Champloose
- Chansey
- Chapatsu
- Characters of Naruto
- Char Aznable
- Chara
- Charter Oath
- Chatan, Okinawa
- Chen Kenichi
- Chi-Chi
- Chiba, Chiba
- Mamoru Chiba
- Chiba Prefecture
- Chiben Gakuen
- ChibiChibi
- Chibiusa
- Chibu, Shimane
- Chichibu, Saitama
- Chigasaki, Kanagawa
- Takako Chigusa
- Chihayaakasaka, Osaka
- Chikamatsu Monzaemon
- Chikugo Province
- Chikugo River
- Chikugo, Fukuoka
- Chikuho, Fukuoka
- Chikujō District, Fukuoka
- Chikuma, Nagano
- Chikusa, Hyogo
- Chikusa-ku, Nagoya
- Chikushi District, Fukuoka
- Chikushino, Fukuoka
- Chikuzen Province
- Children's Day
- Chimata-No-Kami
- Chimecho
- China, Kagoshima
- Chindōgu
- Chinen, Okinawa
- Chino, Nagano
- Chinpara
- Chinzei, Saga
- Chiryu, Aichi
- Chita, Aichi
- Chita District, Aichi
- Chitose, Hokkaidō
- Chitose, Ōita
- Chiyoda, Hiroshima
- Chiyoda, Saga
- Chiyoda, Tokyo
- Chiyonofuji Mitsugu
- Chizu Express
- Chizu, Tottori
- Cho Tsunatatsu
- Chobits
- Chobits characters
- Chobits Media Information
- Chocobo
- Chofu Airport
- Chōfu, Tokyo
- Chōgen
- Chopsticks
- Choshi, Chiba
- Choyo, Kumamoto
- Chrono Break
- Chrono Cross
- Chrono Cross Plot
- Chrono Trigger
- Chrysanthemum
- Chrysanthemum Throne
- Chūbu Centrair International Airport
- Chūbu region
- ChuChu Rocket!
- Chūgoku region
- Chuka, Okayama
- Chun-Li
- Chunan, Kagawa
- Chunichi Dragons
- Chunichi Shimbun
- Chūō Line
- Chūō Main Line
- Chūō Shinkansen
- Chūō-ku (disambiguation)
- Chūō-ku, Chiba
- Chūō-ku, Fukuoka
- Chūō-ku, Kobe
- Chūō-ku, Osaka
- Chūō-ku, Sapporo
- Chūō, Tokyo
- Chūō, Kumamoto

== Ci ==
- Cinema of Japan
- Circuit (country subdivision)
- Cities of Japan
- City designated by government ordinance (Japan)
- City Hunter
- A City with No People

== Cj ==
- CJK characters

== Cl ==
- Clamp (manga artists)
- Classy Crush
- Cloistered rule

== Co ==
- Code Geass
- Comfort women
- Combined Fleet
- Comet Hyakutake
- Comet Ikeya–Seki
- Comic book
- Comic Party
- Coming of age
- Communications in Japan
- Computer Go
- Conqueror (Band-Maid album)
- Constitution of Japan
- Convention of Kanagawa
- Conveyor belt sushi
- Copy protection in Japan
- Core city
- Corsola
- Cosplay
- County
- Cowboy Bebop
- Cowboy Bebop: The Movie
- Cowboy Bebop Media Information

== Cr ==
- Crayon Shin-chan
- Cream Lemon
- Crest of the Stars
- Crime in Japan
- Criminal Code of Japan
- Crotch rope
- Crystalis

== Cu ==
- Cuisine of Japan
- Culture of Japan

== Cy ==
- Cyrillization of Japanese
