= Index of Japan-related articles (0–9) =

This page lists Japan-related articles with titles beginning with a numeral or a symbol. For names of people, please list by surname (i.e., "Tarō Yamada" should be listed under "Y", not "T").

== Symbol ==
- .hack
  - .hack//GIFT
  - .hack//Legend of the Twilight
  - .hack//SIGN
- @onefive

== 0 ==
- 0rphen
- 0 Series Shinkansen

== 1 (one) ==
- 18th Infantry Regiment
- 100 Series Shinkansen
- 100-yen shop
- 1518 (album)
- 1955 System
- 1964 Summer Olympics
- 1998 Winter Olympics

== 2 ==
- 200 Series Shinkansen
- 23 special wards
- 25143 Itokawa
- 2channel

== 3 ==
- 300 Series Shinkansen

== 4 ==
- 400 Series Shinkansen
- 47 Ronin

== 5 (five) ==
- 500 Series Shinkansen

== 6 ==
- 64DD

== 7 ==
- 700 Series Shinkansen
- 700T Series Shinkansen
- 735–737 Japanese smallpox epidemic

== 8 ==
- 800 Series Shinkansen

== See also ==
- List of Japan-related topics
