= Toshiyuki Doi =

Japanese freestyle skier (born 1978)

Toshiyuki Doi (born 18 May 1978) is a Japanese freestyle skier who specializes in the skicross discipline.

He made his World Cup debut in January 2008 with a nineteenth place in Les Contamines. One week later he finished among the top ten for the first time, with a seventh place in Kreischberg. He would repeat this placement once before the season was over; in March in Valmalenco. In the 2008–09 season his best result is a 21st place from Lake Placid in January.
