= Index of Japan-related articles (P) =

This page lists Japan-related articles with romanized titles beginning with the letter P. Names of people are listed by surname (i.e., "Tarō Yamada" should be listed under "Y", not "T") and initial particles (e.g. "a", "an", "the") are ignored (i.e., "A City with No People" is listed under "City").

== Pa ==
- Pac-Man
- Pachinko
- Pacific League
- Pacific Ocean
- Pacific Overtures
- Pacific Theater of Operations
- Pacific War
- Pan (Dragon Ball)
- Panasonic
- Panasonic Q
- Panty fetishism
- Paper Mario
- Para Para
- Paradigm City
- Paradise Kiss
- PaRappa the Rapper
- Parasite singles
- Pauline (Nintendo)

== Pc ==
- PC Engine

== Pe ==
- PE'Z
- Peace Preservation Law
- The Peanuts
- Pentax
- Pente
- Perfect Blue
- Personal Digital Cellular
- A Personal Matter

== Ph ==
- Phantasy Star Online
- Philippine Airlines Flight 434

== Pi ==
- Piccolo (Dragon Ball)
- Pikachu
- The Pillow Book
- The Pillows
- Pilotwings
- Pistol Opera
- Pizzicato Five

== Pl ==
- Planetes
- PlayStation
- PlayStation 2
- PlayStation 3
- PlayStation Portable
- Plaza Accord

== Po ==
- Pokémon
- Pokémon Card Game
- Pokémon Colosseum
- Pokémon FireRed and LeafGreen
- Pokémon Pikachu
- Pokémon Stadium 2
- Pole Position
- Politics of Japan
- Pom Poko
- Ponzu
- Porco Rosso
- Pornography in Japan
- Port Island
- Porunga
- Post-Occupation Japan
- Posthumous name
- Potsdam Conference
- Potsdam Declaration
- Poupée Girl
- Power Stone

== Pr ==
- Prefecture
- Prefectures of Japan
- Pretty Sammy
- Prime Minister of Japan
- Prince Asaka (Yasuhiko)
- Prince Higashikuni Naruhiko
- Prince Hisaaki
- Prince Koreyasu
- Prince Morikuni
- Prince Morinaga
- Prince Munetaka
- Prince Narinaga
- Prince Nashimoto (Morimasa)
- Prince Nashimoto Moriosa
- The Prince of Tennis
- Princess Peach
- Prince Shōtoku
- Princess Mononoke
- Princess Tutu
- Princess Zelda
- Production I.G
- Program (The Animatrix)
- Project A-ko
- Project Sugita Genpaku
- Provinces of Japan
- Provincial temple

== Pu ==
- Puni Puni Poemy
- Pure Land Buddhism
- PURPLE
- Puyi
- Puyo Puyo
