= Enmyō-in =

Buddhist temple in Kimitsu, Japan

- 圓明院
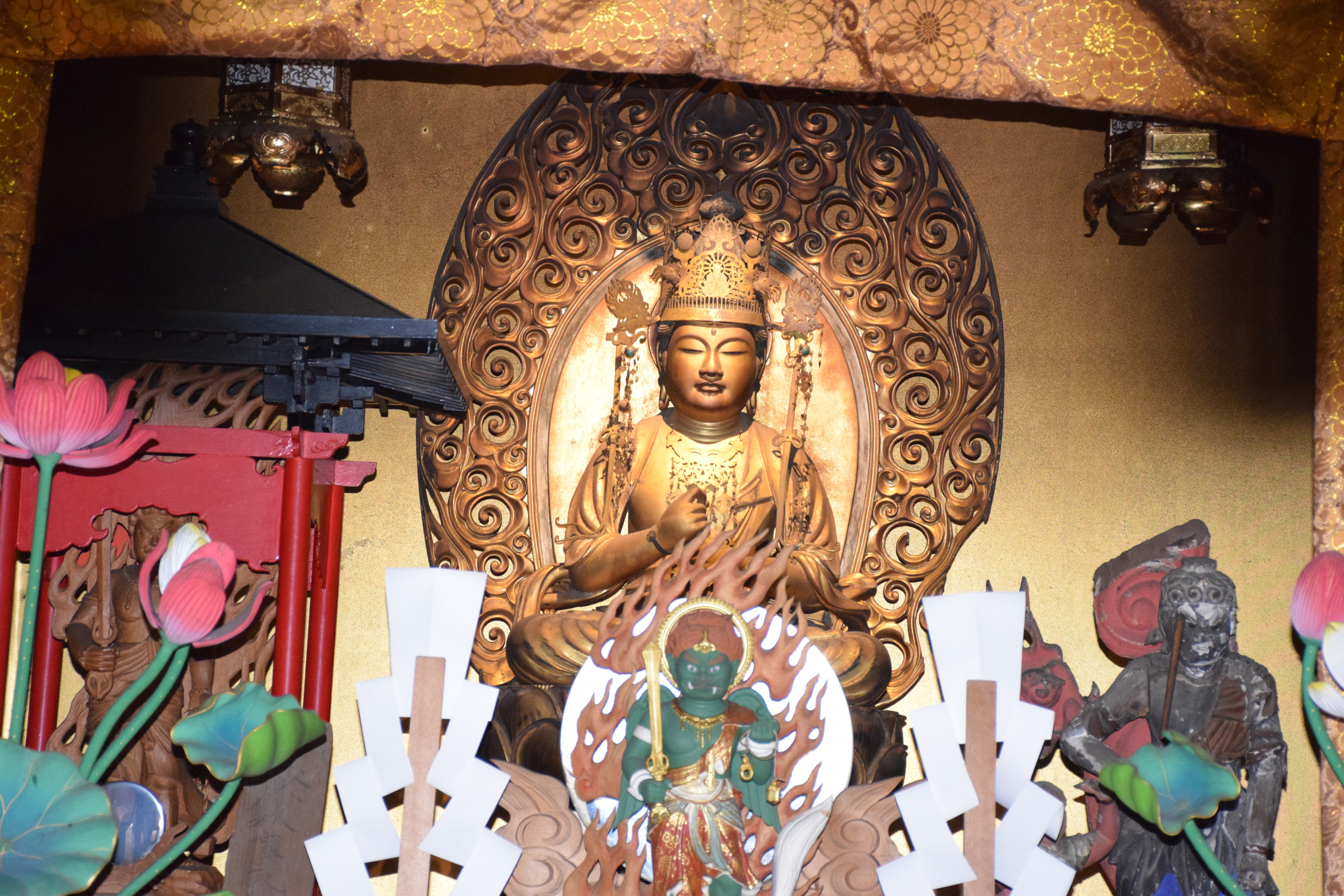

Religion
- Affiliation: Buddhism
- Deity: Fudō Myōō
- Rite: Shingon Chisan-ha

Location
- Location: 1535 Yamamoto, Kimitsu, Chiba Prefecture
- Country: Japan
- Interactive map of Enmyō-in
- Coordinates: 35°20′N 140°03′E

Architecture
- Completed: Early Kamakura period, ca. 1185-

Website
- sensin.net/enmyou/

Enmyō-in (圓明院) is a Buddhist temple of the Shingon Chisan-ha located in the city of Kimitsu in Chiba Prefecture. Its honzon, or primary object of veneration, is a statute of Fudō Myōō. A well-known kaya, or Japanese nutmeg-yew tree, of almost 5.4 meters in circumference is located within the temple grounds. A small hall was built at Enmyō-in in 1989 dedicated to prayers for traffic safety.

== History ==
The origins of Enmyō-in are unclear, but it is traditionally thought to have been founded in the early Kamakura period, and was an early Shugendō temple. It fell in ruin, but was revived during the Keian years of the Edo period, approximately 1648-1652.
