= Kasei, Kenya =

Kasei
- Location within Kenya
- Coordinates: 1.97°N 35.2°E
- Country: Kenya
- Province: Rift Valley Province
- Time zone: UTC+3 (EAT)

Kasei is a settlement in Kenya's Rift Valley Province.
