= Rakuto Kasei =

Japanese chemical company

Rakuto Kasei Industrial Co., Ltd. 洛東化成工業株式会社
- Company type: Private K.K.
- Industry: Chemicals
- Founded: 1952
- Headquarters: Otsu City, Japan
- Key people: Hiroshi Asada, President; Osamu Tanida, Director; Goro Kawabata, Director; Hiroaki Yoshida, Auditor
- Products: Industrial enzymes, animal feed additives, dishwashing detergent, fertilizer, and color deepening agents

Rakuto Kasei is a Japanese multinational chemicals company, with their headquarters in Otsu City, Japan and offices in Yokneam, Israel. They produce chemical products, including animal feed additives, dishwashing detergent, fertilizer, and color deepening agents for blue jeans.

== Offices ==
Rakuto's Japanese operations are based in Otsu City, in the Konan region, south of Lake Biwa. The company employs approximately 50 people, and performs biotechnology research in addition to manufacturing, for which it holds patents in the EU. Rakuto Kasei is a supporting member of the Japanese Society for Biotechnology.

Rakuto Kasei (Israel) Ltd. was established in 1990 as a joint venture with the Japanese company. Their Israeli operation is run by its president, Dr. Roni Bornstein, and involves industrial enzymes, nutraceuticals, pharmaceuticals, optical brighteners, whiteners, textile auxiliaries, wine technology, and food distribution. In 2006, the company entered into an investment partnership with Israeli manufacturing company Biodalia Technologies to market biopesticides and bioinsecticides to develop products for the food and beverage industry. Rakuto Kasei Israel has developed food division which is primarily importing and distributing Asian premium including Kikkoman Soy sauce, JFC products, Sapporo Beer and more. Dr. Roni Bornstein has served as the Chairman of the Israel Japan chamber of commerce and Friendship Society between the years 1998-2004 and was reelected to the same post in September 2009.
