= Enmyō-ji =

Buddhist temple in Ehime Prefecture, Japan

Coordinates: 33°53′29.3″N 132°44′24.1″E

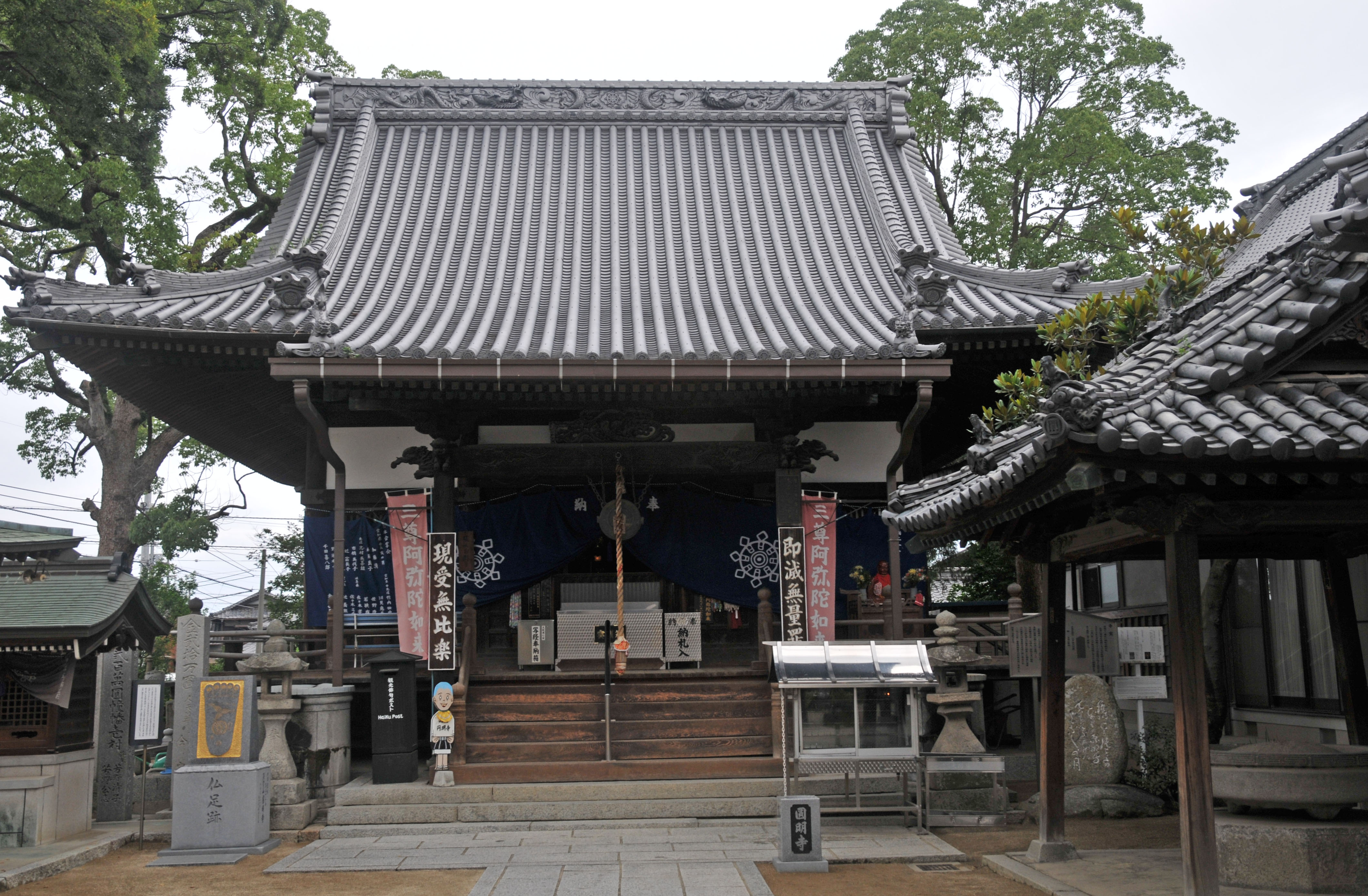
Enmyō-ji Hondō

Enmyō-ji (円明寺) is a Shingon Buddhist temple in Matsuyama, Ehime Prefecture, Japan. It is Temple 53 on the Shikoku 88 temple pilgrimage.

== History ==
Said to have been founded by Gyōki, the temple was largely destroyed during the wars of the sixteenth century and has been rebuilt.

== Buildings ==
- Yatsuashi-mon (late seventeenth century with Muromachi period elements) (Prefectural Cultural Property)

== See also ==
- Shikoku 88 temple pilgrimage
