= Nagako =

Nagako is an uncommon Japanese given name for females. Although written romanized the same way, the kanji can be different. Notable people with the name include:

- Princess Kuni Nagako (久邇宮良子女王), later Empress Nagako of Japan (皇后良子)
- Fujiwara no Nagako (藤原長子; 1079–1119), Japanese servant of two Japanese tennōs during the Heian period
- Nagako Konishi (小西 奈雅子; born 1945), Japanese composer
- Nagako Konoe (近衛 長子; 1218–1275), Empress of Japan as the consort of Emperor Go-Horikawa
- Nagako Mori (森 奈賀子; born 1975), Japanese snowboarder, specializing in halfpipe riding
- Nagako Nabeshima (鍋島 榮子; 1855–1941), Japanese aristocratic
- Nagako Nagaoka (長岡 良子; 1903–1983/1984), Japanese medium, spiritual healer and religious leader
