= List of cultural properties of Japan – historical materials (Ehime) =

This list is of the cultural properties of Japan designated in the category of historical materials (歴史資料, rekishi shiryō) for the Prefecture of Ehime.

== National Cultural Properties ==
As of 1 February 2015, one Important Cultural Property has been designated, being of national significance.

Property	Date	Municipality	Ownership	Comments	Image	Coordinates	Ref.
Materials relating to the Meguro Mountain Model 目黒山形関係資料; Meguro yamagata kankei shiryō	Edo period	Matsuno	Kentoku-ji (建徳寺) (kept at Meguro Furusatokan (目黒ふるさと館))	2,011 items; the model dates from 1665		33°09′45″N 132°41′39″E	

== Prefectural Cultural Properties ==
As of 10 December 2014, two properties has been designated at a prefectural level.

Property	Date	Municipality	Ownership	Comments	Image	Coordinates	Ref.
Botchan Ressha 坊っちゃん列車; Botchan ressha	1887	Matsuyama	Iyo Railway			33°51′02″N 132°47′07″E	
Sasayama Mountain Model 篠山山形模型; Sasayama yamagata mokei	1656/7	Uwajima	Taga Jinja (多賀神社)			33°13′43″N 132°33′42″E	

== See also ==
- Cultural Properties of Japan
- List of National Treasures of Japan (historical materials)
- List of Historic Sites of Japan (Ehime)
- Iyo Province
