= Kamishima Island, Amakusa =

Island in the Amakusa archipelago of Japan

Kamishima Island
Native name: 上島 Kamishima
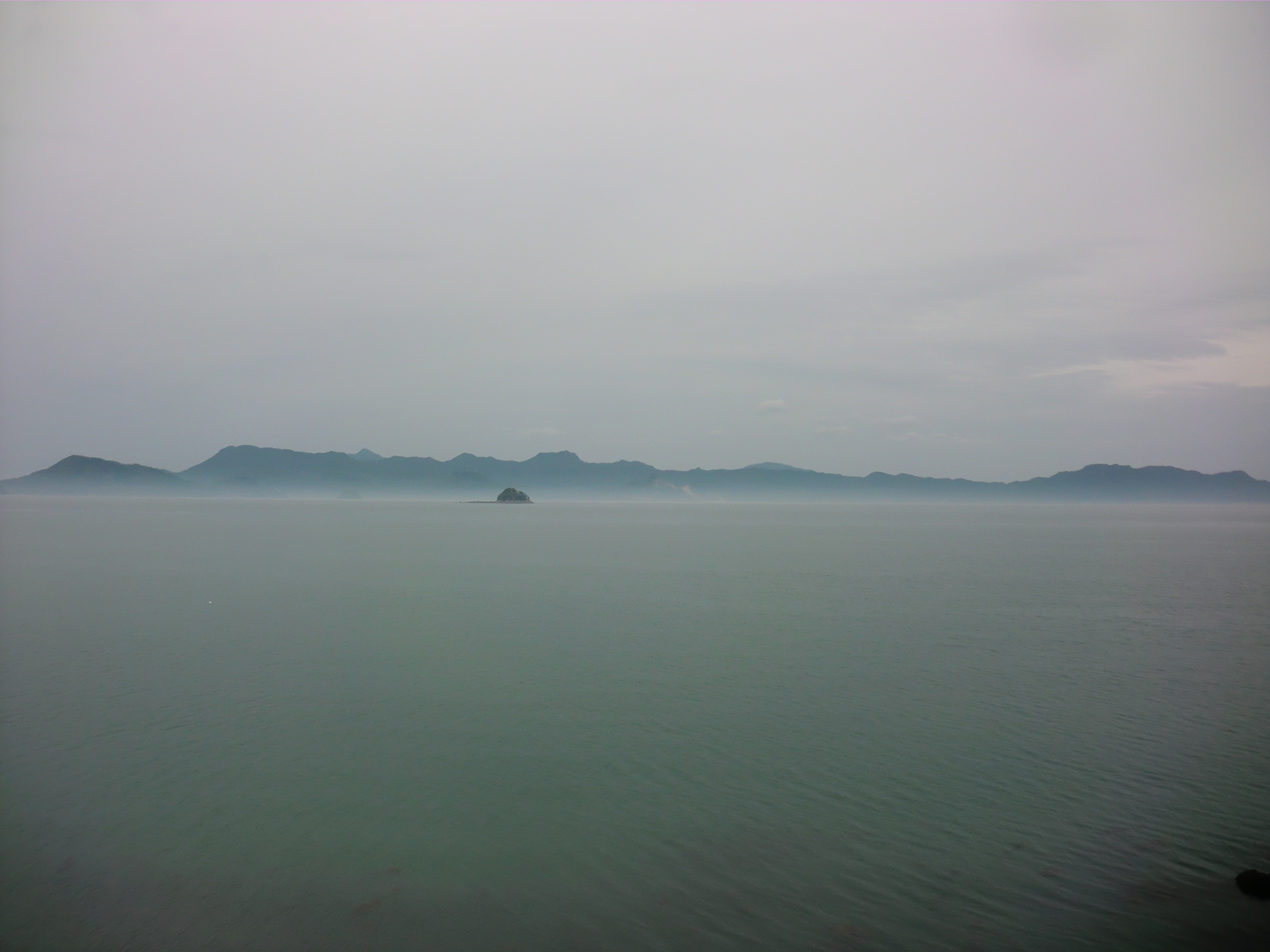
- The view of Kamishima from the Hisatsu Orange Railway

- Location within Kumamoto Prefecture

Geography
- Location: Ariake Sea, Yatsushiro Sea
- Coordinates: 32°26′0″N 130°20′0″E
- Archipelago: Amakusa
- Area: 225.32 km^{2} (87.00 sq mi)
- Length: 25 km (15.5 mi)
- Width: 15 km (9.3 mi)
- Highest elevation: 682 m (2238 ft)
- Highest point: mount Kuratake

Administration
- Japan
- Prefecture: Kumamoto Prefecture

Demographics
- Population: 34412 (2000)
- Pop. density: 153/km^{2} (396/sq mi)
- Ethnic groups: Japanese

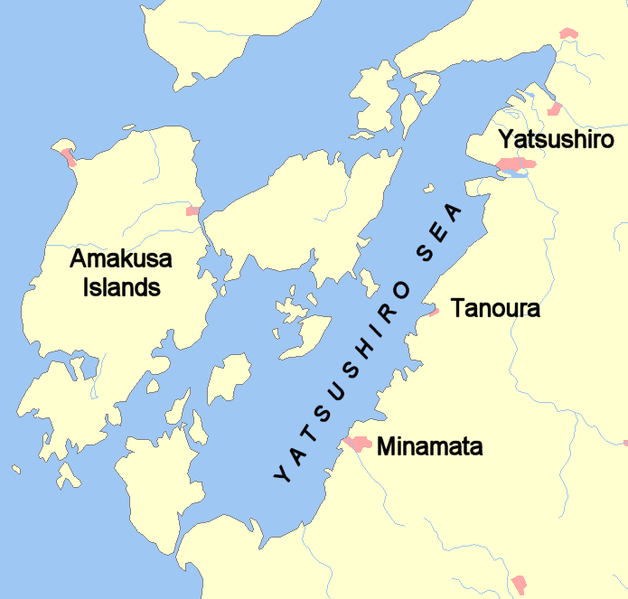

Kamishima (上島, Kamishima) (also erroneously named Ueshima Island) is the second largest island in the Amakusa archipelago of Japan. Its coasts are washed by Yatsushiro Sea and Shimabara Bay of Ariake Sea, both being the part of East China Sea. The western part of Kamishima Island is administered as part of Amakusa city, while eastern part is administered as part of Kami-Amakusa city. The island's highest peak is Mount Kuratake 682 m (2,238 ft).

== Transportation ==
The Five Bridges of Amakusa connects the Kamishima Island to the Kyushu mainland since 1966. Additionally, the Amakusa-seto Oohashi connects Kamishima to Shimoshima island - the largest island in Amakusa archipelago. The national roads serving the island are the Route 266 and Route 324

== Climate ==
Kamishima Island is located in the humid subtropical climate zone (Köppen Cfa), with four distinct seasons. Winters tend to be sunny, windy, and relatively dry; snow falls occasionally in the higher elevations, but seldom near sea level. Spring in Kamishima Island starts off mild, but ends up being hot and humid. The summer tends to be Kamishima's wettest season, with the tsuyu (梅雨, tsuyu; "plum rain") — the rainy season — occurring between early June (average: June 7) to late July (average: July 21). The island's weather is affected by the nearby Liman current while being shielded from the warm Kuroshio Current off the coast of Kyushu island, resulting in a wetter and colder climate than should be expected at those latitudes.

Climate data for Matsushima, Kamishima (1981–2010)
| Month | Jan | Feb | Mar | Apr | May | Jun | Jul | Aug | Sep | Oct | Nov | Dec | Year |
|---|---|---|---|---|---|---|---|---|---|---|---|---|---|
| Mean daily maximum °C (°F) | 10.5 (50.9) | 11.8 (53.2) | 15.1 (59.2) | 20.3 (68.5) | 24.4 (75.9) | 27.2 (81.0) | 30.9 (87.6) | 32.3 (90.1) | 29.0 (84.2) | 24.0 (75.2) | 18.3 (64.9) | 13.0 (55.4) | 21.4 (70.5) |
| Daily mean °C (°F) | 6.1 (43.0) | 7.1 (44.8) | 10.2 (50.4) | 14.9 (58.8) | 19.0 (66.2) | 22.5 (72.5) | 26.4 (79.5) | 27.2 (81.0) | 24.1 (75.4) | 18.7 (65.7) | 13.3 (55.9) | 8.3 (46.9) | 16.5 (61.7) |
| Mean daily minimum °C (°F) | 1.7 (35.1) | 2.4 (36.3) | 5.4 (41.7) | 9.9 (49.8) | 14.2 (57.6) | 18.7 (65.7) | 22.9 (73.2) | 23.3 (73.9) | 20.3 (68.5) | 14.2 (57.6) | 8.8 (47.8) | 3.8 (38.8) | 12.1 (53.8) |
| Average precipitation mm (inches) | 72.9 (2.87) | 87.8 (3.46) | 139.2 (5.48) | 145.9 (5.74) | 176.8 (6.96) | 363.8 (14.32) | 373.5 (14.70) | 184.6 (7.27) | 169.3 (6.67) | 84.9 (3.34) | 89.2 (3.51) | 64.2 (2.53) | 1,959 (77.13) |
| Mean monthly sunshine hours | 114.4 | 129.6 | 151.6 | 177.1 | 181.8 | 139.0 | 195.9 | 217.4 | 182.9 | 182.0 | 142.1 | 130.4 | 1,945.4 |
Source: Japan Meteorological Agency

== Attractions ==
- Myūi Observatory
- Five Bridges of Amakusa

== Notable people ==
- Amakusa Shirō

== See also ==
=== Islands with similar names ===
- Kami-shima
- Kamino-shima
- Kamijima, Ehime

=== Other related ===
- Amakusa
- Shimoshima Island, Amakusa
- This article incorporates material from Japanese Wikipedia page 上島 (天草諸島), accessed 4 August 2017
