= Amakusa (disambiguation) =

Amakusa is a series of islands belonging to Japan.

Amakusa may also refer to:

- Amakusa, Kumamoto, Japan
- Amakusa, Kumamoto (town), Japan
- Amakusa Airfield, a Japanese airport
- Amakusa Airlines, a Japanese airline based at the airport of the same name
- Amakusa District, Kumamoto, Japan
- Amakusa Sea, a sea area extending to the west of Shimoshima Island, Amakusa in Japan
- Amakusa Shirō (c. 1621 – 1638), Japanese Roman Catholic martyr
- Japanese escort ship Amakusa, an Etorofu-class escort ship of the Imperial Japanese Navy
- JS Amakusa, a Hiuchi-class support ship of the Japanese Maritime Self-Defense Force
- Yuki Sato (born 1985), Japanese professional wrestler known under the ring name Amakusa
