= Nagashima Island, Kagoshima =

Island in the Amakusa islands of Japan

Nagashima Island
Native name: 長島 Nagashima
- Location within Kumamoto Prefecture

Geography
- Location: Yatsuhiro Sea, East China Sea
- Coordinates: 32°09′00″N 130°09′0″E
- Length: 16 km (9.9 mi)
- Width: 11 km (6.8 mi)
- Highest elevation: 403 m (1322 ft)
- Highest point: mount Dainaka-dake

Administration
- Japan
- Prefecture: Kagoshima Prefecture
- city: Nagashima

Demographics
- Population: 10120 (2000)
- Pop. density: 112/km^{2} (290/sq mi)
- Ethnic groups: Japanese

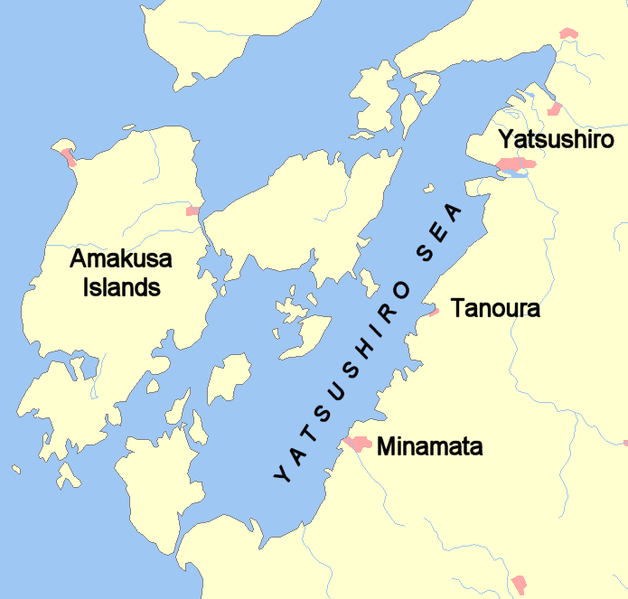

Nagashima (長島, Nagashima) is an island in the Amakusa islands, south of Shimoshima Island. Its coasts are washed by Yatsuhiro Sea, Hachimannoseto strait and East China Sea. Nagashima Island, together with Shishi-jima, Shoura Island and Ikara islands, has been administered as part of Nagashima town since 2006. The island's highest peak is Mount Dainaka-dake 403 m (1,322 ft), although Mount Yatake is only slightly lower at 402 m (1,319 ft)

== Transportation ==
Nagashima Island is connected to the Kyushu mainland by the Kuronoseto Oohashi bridge (completed in 1974) over 400-meter wide strait. It is also connected to Ikara Island by Ikara Oohashi since 1990 and to Shoura Island since 1966. The national roads serving the island is Route 389.

A ferry line also connects Nagashima Island to the Shimoshima island.

== History ==
Nagashima is believed to be the place where Tangerine (Citrus unshiu) was introduced to Japan in the early Edo period. Later in the Edo period the island was notable for its fruit gardens and horse grazing meadows. Modern Nagashima is concentrated on the food industry, in particular on alcoholic beverages, garments, shoes, and electronics manufacture.

== Climate ==
Nagashima Island is located in the humid subtropical climate zone (Köppen Cfa), with four distinct seasons. The island never sees snowfall during the winter. Spring in Shimoshima Island starts off mild, but ends up being hot and humid. The summer tends to be Shimoshima's wettest season, with the tsuyu (梅雨, tsuyu; "plum rain") — the rainy season — occurring between early June (average:Jun.7) to late July (average:Jul.21). The island's weather is affected by the nearby Liman current while being shielded from the warm Kuroshio Current by the Kyushu island, resulting in wetter and colder climate than should be expected at lower 30`s latitudes.

== Attractions ==
- Sasue Kofun at 32.152693°N 130.116102°E

== See also ==
- Amakusa
- Nagashima, Kagoshima
