= Yushima (island) =

Island in Kumamoto Prefecture, Japan

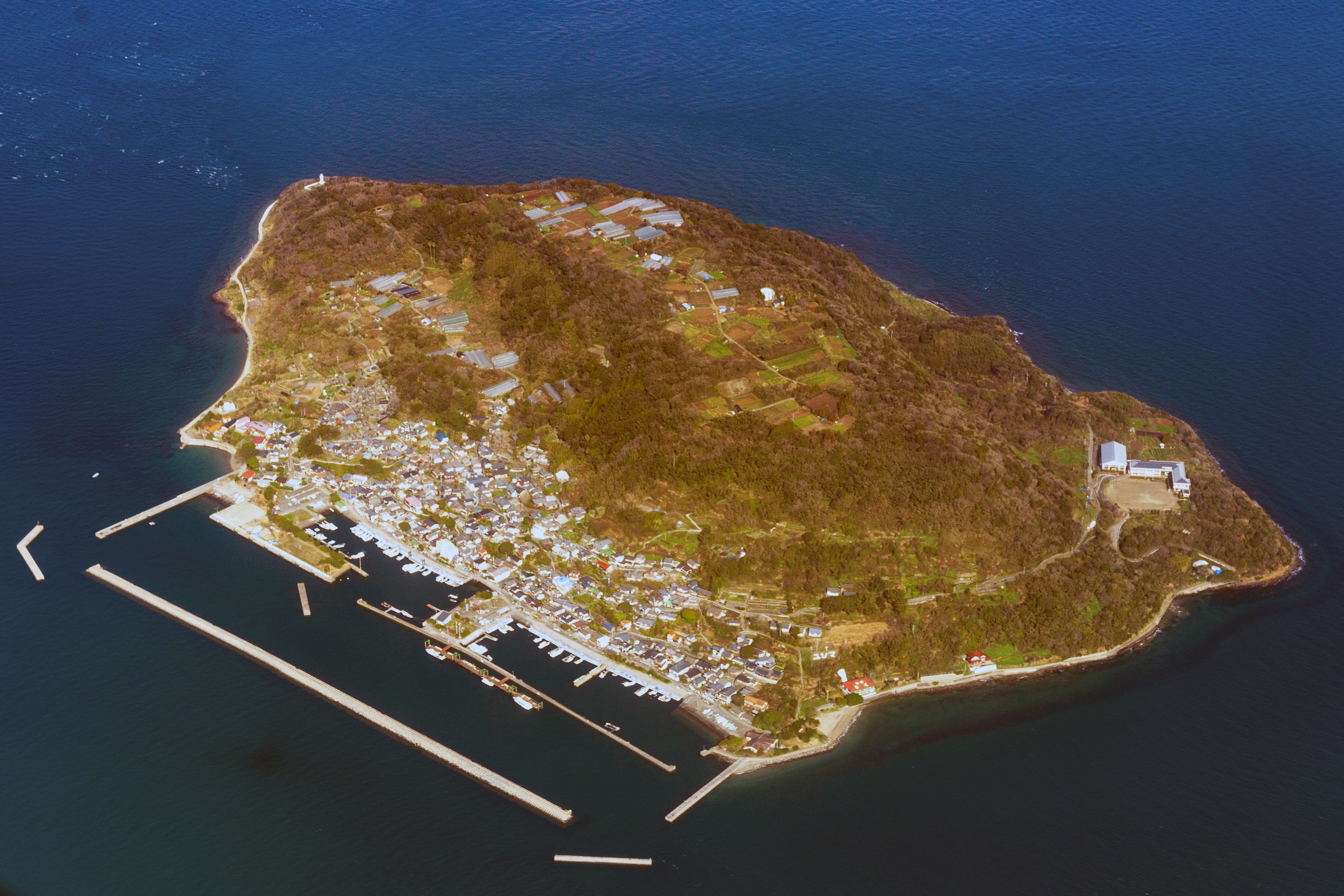
- Aerial view of Yushima, 2019
- Interactive map of Yushima

Geography
- Coordinates: 32°36′10″N 130°20′15″E
- Archipelago: Amakusa Islands
- Area: 0.52 km^{2} (0.20 sq mi)
- Coastline: 3.5 km (2.17 mi)

Administration
- Japan
- Prefecture: Kumamoto

Yushima is an island situated between Ōyano-jima in the Amakusa Islands and the Shimabara Peninsula.. It is located in Oyano-machi, Kamiamakusa City, Kumamoto Prefecture. This article also covers Yushima Village (Yushima-mura), Amakusa District, which was formerly situated within this same area.

== Overview ==
It is an island located in the Ariake Sea, located approximately 9 kilometers offshore from Ehido Port in Oyano Town. It has a circumference of approximately 3.5 km, and an elevation of approximately 100 meters. The island's topography is flat and table-like, formed by a layer of basalt approximately 10 meters thick resting atop sandstone and mudstone.

During the Shimabara Rebellion, the ringleaders gathered on this island to devise their strategies, earning it the nickname "Dangō-jima" (Consultation Island).また、The island is home to a large number of cats and bears the nickname "cat island." As of May 2024, it is estimated that there are approximately 200 cats for a population of about 260 people.

There are groves of akou trees spread across the island.

The Yushima Lighthouse, located on the island, was first lit on December 1, 1916 (Taisho 5).

The surnames "Matsuo," "Mori," "Watanabe," "Takahashi," and "Koga" account for the vast majority of the islanders' surnames.

== History ==
- As of the Bakumatsu period, it belonged to Kamimura in Amakusa District.
- 1880 (Meiji 13) — Separated from Kamimura to become Yushima Village. (320 households; population: 1,608)
- April 1, 1889 (Meiji 22) — With the enactment of the Town and Village System, Yushima Village was established as an independent municipality. (336 households; population: 1,456)
- April 1, 1954 (Showa 29) - Yushima Village merged with Noboritate Town, Kamimura, Nakamura, and Iwamura to form Oyano Town. It became a large administrative division of that town.
- March 31, 2004 (Heisei 16) — Oyanomachi merged with Ryūgatakedake-machi, Matsushima-machi, and Hime-domachi to form the City of Kami-Amakusa. The area subsequently became Yushima, Oyanomachi, within the new city.

== Transportation ==
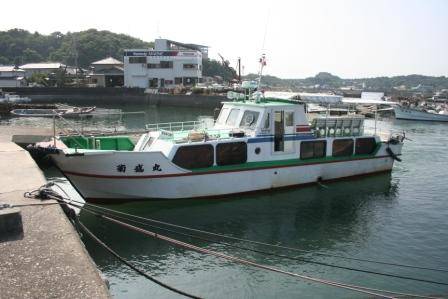
Yushima Shosen's Kikumorimaru (Photographed in September 2009)

There is no public transportation on the island. Residents primarily use motorcycles for getting around. For transportation to and from the island, a regular ferry service operates five round trips daily between Ehido Port and Yushima Port in Kamiamakusa City. The journey takes approximately 25 minutes, and the fare is 800 yen for adults (junior high school age and older) and 400 yen for children (Yushima Shosen).

To reach Ehido Port, take the Kyushu Sanko Bus "Amakusa-go" from the Kumamoto Sakuramachi Bus Terminal or Kumamoto Station, alight at "Sanparu," and then transfer to the SUN Marine Bus Central Loop Line. If traveling by private vehicle, the port is located 35 km from the Matsubase Interchange on the Kyushu Expressway.

From February 1962 to September 2007, services also operated to Misumi Port, running one round trip per day. Currently, services to Misumi Port are operated as charter flights.

== Schools ==
- Kamiamakusa City Yushima Elementary School
- Kamiamakusa City Yushima Junior High School

== Notable locations ==
- Yushima West Beach
- Yushima Higashi Swimming Beach
- Yushimamine Park
- The Monument at Dangōjima
- Yushima Post Office

== See also ==
- List of islands of Japan
