= Harima no Tsubone =

Japanese samurai woman

Harima no Tsubone (播磨局)

Chief of the Amakusa clan Castellan of Hondo castle
- In office 1233–Unknown
- Preceded by: Amakusa Taneuji
- Succeeded by: Amakusa Tanezane

Military service
- Unit: Amakusa clan

Harima no Tsubone (播磨局) was a Japanese female samurai warlord and chief of Amakusa clan during the mid-Kamakura period (1185–1333). She was the daughter of Amakusa Taneuji, a warrior from Hizen Province. She is best known for her role in defending Shimoshima island during the Mongol invasions of Japan. Her given name was Ōkura no Ōiko (大蔵太子). (Note: Ōiko is read as "oo-iko". According to Bun'e Kakuta, it is a type of female name classified as "rank-type" derived from birth order, with types such as "chikako" and "mikako." "Taiko" means eldest daughter. ^ Daughter. Inherited Oe from her father (present-day Ōe, Amakusa City, Kumamoto Prefecture).)

== Life ==
Harima no Tsubone's father, Amakusa Taneuji, who was descended from the Ōkura clan, was the lord of the newly developed territory of Shimoshima Island in Amakusa. Shimoshima is connected to Kamishima island, and through it to Kyushu mainland.

In 1233, he entrusted the position of head of the territory, which was part of her main estate, to his daughter Harima, thereby making her the head of the Amakusa clan. She received Hondo Castle (ほんどじょう), a mountain castle, as her property and was allied with the daimyo of the Okura clan.

In 1281, during the Mongol invasions of Japan, Harima no Tsubone personally led troops into battle and achieved military success due to the miraculous power of Suwa Myojin. In 1283, she had a branch shrine of Suwa Taisha established within her territory, known as the Moto-watari Suwa Shrine. Additionally, she founded the Kemmyōji temple in Kamegawa as her father's memorial temple and donated temple land. Having no children of her own, she adopted her nephew, Tanezane, as her heir, who then succeeded her as the head of the Amakusa clan. Tanezane also distinguished himself in battle and was appointed to a high position within the Amakusa clan during the Mongol invasions.

== See also ==
- List of female castellans in Japan

== Bibliography ==
- Matsumoto, Masaki, ed. (1985), Placenames of Kumamoto Prefecture (book), Nihon Rekishi Chimei Daikei (in Japanese), Heibonsha, ISBN 9784582910520
- Kakuta, Bun'e, ed. (1980), Japanese Women's Names (book), Kyōiku-sha Rekishi Shinsho: Nihon-shi (in Japanese), Kyōiku-sha, ISBN 9784315401813
- The Editorial Committee of Reihoku Town History, ed. (1984), Reihoku Town History (book) (in Japanese), Reihoku Town
