= Yushima =

Yushima may refer to:

== Places ==
- Yushima (island), a Japanese island in the Amakusa group
- Yushima Seidō, a Confucian temple (聖堂) in Yushima, Tokyo, Japan
- Yushima Tenmangū, a Shinto shrine in Bunkyō ward of Tokyo, Japan

=== Stations ===
- Yushima Station (Iwate) - (油島駅) in Ichinoseki, Iwate
- Yushima Station (Tokyo) - (湯島駅) in Bunkyō, Tokyo

== Other ==
- Yushima Formation, a palaeontological formation in Japan
- The Romance of Yushima, 1955 Japanese romance drama film
