= Shimoshima Island, Amakusa =

Largest island in the Amakusa archipelago

Shimoshima Island
Native name: 下島 Shimoshima
- Location in Kumamoto Prefecture Location in Kyushu Location in Japan

Geography
- Location: Ariake Sea, East China Sea
- Coordinates: 32°26′11″N 130°5′1″E
- Archipelago: Amakusa
- Area: 574.01 km^{2} (221.63 sq mi)
- Length: 44 km (27.3 mi)
- Width: 21 km (13 mi)
- Coastline: 301.2 km (187.16 mi)
- Highest elevation: 538.4 m (1766.4 ft)
- Highest point: mount Tenjiku

Administration
- Japan
- Prefecture: Kumamoto Prefecture

Demographics
- Population: 87191 (2000)
- Pop. density: 152/km^{2} (394/sq mi)
- Ethnic groups: Japanese

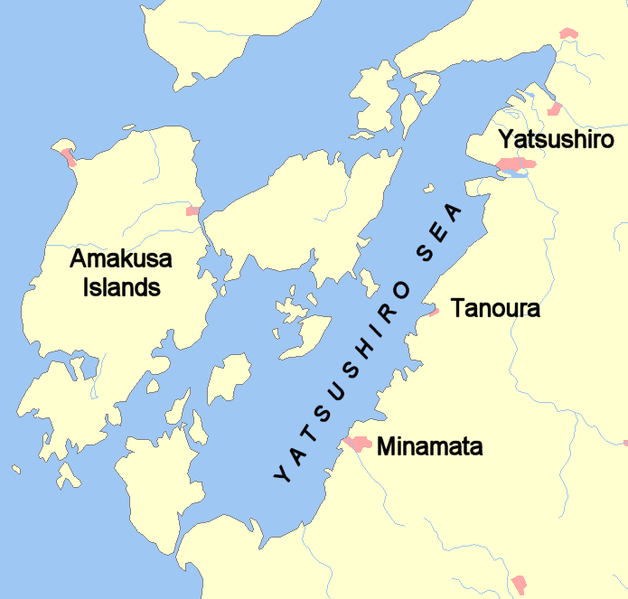

Shimoshima (Japanese: 下島, Hepburn: Shimoshima) is the largest island in the Amakusa archipelago. Its coasts are washed by Ariake Sea, Amakusa-nada sea, East China Sea and Yatsushiro Sea. Most of Shimoshima Island is administered as part of Amakusa city, with 67 km^{2} patch on north-west coast belonging to the town of Reihoku. The island's highest peak is Mount Tenjiku 538.4 m (1,766 ft).

== Transportation ==
Shimoshima is connected to Kamishima island, and through it to Kyushu mainland, by Amakusa-seto Oohashi bridge (completed in 1966) and pedestrian bridge over 70-meter wide tidal channel. It is also connected by Ushibukahaiyao Bridge to the Gezu Island on the southern tip. The national roads serving the island are the Route 266, Route 324 and Route 389.

The Amakusa Airfield on the north of the island provide scheduled services to the Itami Airport, Fukuoka Airport and Kumamoto Airport since opening in 2000.

The public transportation inside the island is provided by the extensive bus network with the hub in Hondo Bus Center near the bridge to the mainland.

At least five ferry lines also connect the Shimoshima island to other islands in Kagoshima, Kumamoto and Nagasaki prefectures.

== Climate ==
Shimoshima Island is located in the humid subtropical climate zone (Köppen Cfa), with four distinct seasons. During the winter, the higher elevations see some snowfall, but the lower, populated areas seldom do. Spring in Shimoshima Island starts off mild, but ends up being hot and humid. The summer tends to be Shimoshima's wettest season, with the tsuyu (梅雨, tsuyu; "plum rain") — the rainy season — occurring between early June (average:Jun.7) to late July (average:Jul.21). The island's weather is affected by the nearby Liman current while being shielded from the warm Kuroshio Current by a part of the Kyushu island, resulting in wetter and colder climate than should be expected at lower 30's latitudes.

Climate data for Hondo, Shimoshima (1981–2010)
Month	Jan	Feb	Mar	Apr	May	Jun	Jul	Aug	Sep	Oct	Nov	Dec	Year
Mean daily maximum °C (°F)	10.5 (50.9)	11.9 (53.4)	15.2 (59.4)	20.6 (69.1)	24.9 (76.8)	27.5 (81.5)	31.2 (88.2)	32.4 (90.3)	29.0 (84.2)	23.9 (75.0)	18.2 (64.8)	13.0 (55.4)	21.6 (70.9)
Daily mean °C (°F)	6.1 (43.0)	7.0 (44.6)	10.0 (50.0)	14.8 (58.6)	19.0 (66.2)	22.5 (72.5)	26.4 (79.5)	27.1 (80.8)	23.9 (75.0)	18.6 (65.5)	13.2 (55.8)	8.2 (46.8)	16.4 (61.5)
Mean daily minimum °C (°F)	1.9 (35.4)	2.5 (36.5)	5.3 (41.5)	9.5 (49.1)	13.9 (57.0)	18.5 (65.3)	22.7 (72.9)	23.1 (73.6)	20.1 (68.2)	14.2 (57.6)	9.0 (48.2)	4.0 (39.2)	12.1 (53.8)
Average precipitation mm (inches)	84.0 (3.31)	92.7 (3.65)	150.7 (5.93)	164.3 (6.47)	193.8 (7.63)	357.3 (14.07)	356.1 (14.02)	213.1 (8.39)	194.5 (7.66)	92.5 (3.64)	99.9 (3.93)	79.3 (3.12)	2,075.9 (81.73)
Mean monthly sunshine hours	106.2	125.6	150.7	176.4	181.9	132.0	182.2	212.3	184.9	189.3	145.4	127.3	1,914.8
Source: Japan Meteorological Agency

== Attractions ==
- Amakusa Christian museum
- "Dolphin`s world" public aquarium
- Tomioka Castle
- Sakitsu Cathedral

== See also ==
- Amakusa
- Kamishima Island, Amakusa
- 5 Pairs of Shoes - a novel written in 1907, involving Shimoshima island
- This article incorporates material from Japanese Wikipedia page 下島 (天草諸島), accessed 3 August 2017
