= Ōyano-jima =

Native name: 大矢野島
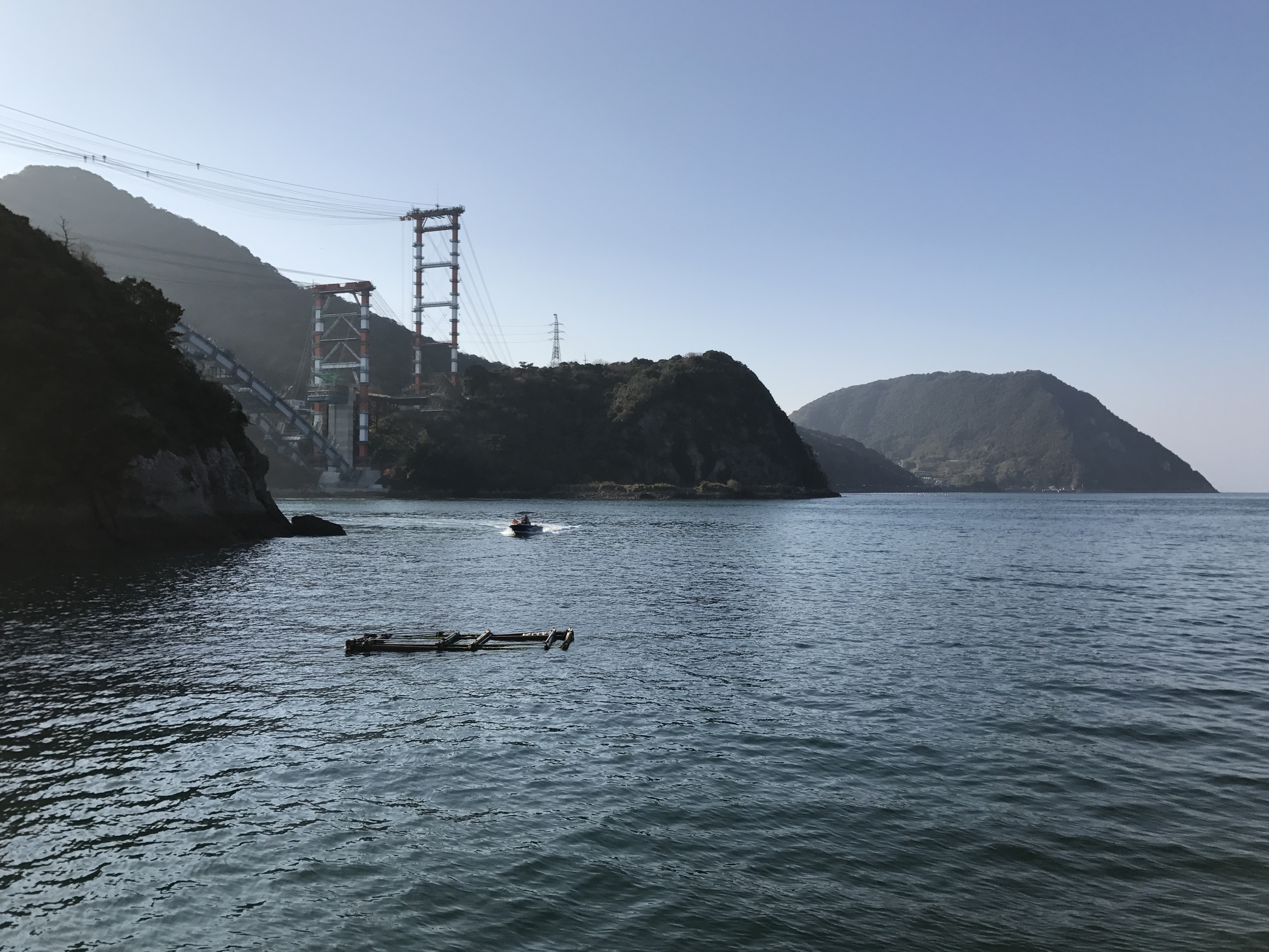
- North-eastern part of Ōyanojima and Temmonkyo bridge

- Location within Japan

Geography
- Location: Ariake Sea
- Coordinates: 32°35′N 130°26′E
- Archipelago: Amakusa
- Area: 29.88 km^{2} (11.54 sq mi)
- Length: 8 km (5 mi)
- Width: 3 km (1.9 mi)
- Coastline: 55.4 km (34.42 mi)
- Highest elevation: 229 m (751 ft)
- Highest point: Tobidake

Administration
- Japan
- Prefectures: Kumamoto Prefecture
- City: Kami-Amakusa

Demographics
- Population: 14,729 (2005)
- Pop. density: 493/km^{2} (1277/sq mi)
- Ethnic groups: Japanese

Ōyano-jima (大矢野島), also spelt as Ōyanojima It is administered as part of the city of Kami-Amakusa. It is connected to the Japanese mainland since 1966 by Five Bridges of Amakusa. The Japan National Route 266 passes through the island. The island primary industry is aquaculture of fish and shrimps. Large part of island belongs to Unzen-Amakusa National Park.

== Geography ==
Ōyano-jima is an irregular shape, with a ragged, elongated outline oriented at north-south axis. The highest mount is Tobidake (飛岳) which stands at 229 m. Ōyano-jima is the third largest island in the Amakusa group lying west of Kyushu, Japan. It is a northernmost island in the archipelago and serves as a gateway to entire Amakusa.

== Climate ==
Ōyano-jima has a humid subtropical climate (Köppen climate classification Cfa) with very warm summers and mild winters. Precipitation is significant throughout the year; The summer tends to be Ōyano-jima's wettest season, with the tsuyu (梅雨 tsuyu, "plum rain") — the rainy season — occurring between early June (average:Jun.7) to late July (average:Jul.21).

== Notable people ==
- Amakusa Shirō (leader of Shimabara rebellion)
