= Amakusa 1637 (disambiguation) =

Amakusa 1637 may refer to:

- Amakusa 1637, manga written by Michiyo Akaishi
- Shimabara Rebellion, led by Amakusa Shirō, began in 1637

== See also ==
- Amakusa (disambiguation)
