= Ōyano, Kumamoto =

Dissolved municipality in Kumamoto prefecture, Japan

Ōyano (大矢野町, Ōyano-machi) was a town located in Amakusa District, Kumamoto Prefecture, Japan.

== Population ==
As of 2003, the town had an estimated population of 17,017 and a density of 448.05 persons per km^{2}. The total area was 37.98 km^{2}.

== Geography ==
On March 31, 2004, Ōyano, along with the towns of Himedo, Matsushima and Ryūgatake (all from Amakusa District), was merged to create the city of Kami-Amakusa and no longer exists as an independent municipality.

The main island comprising Ōyano is still called Ōyano Island, and is connected to mainland Kyushu by the first of the "Amakusa Five Bridges", Tenmonbashi. Ōyano is connected to the rest of Kami-Amakusa City by the second through fifth bridges: Oyanobashi, Nakanobashi, Maejimabashi, and Matsushimabashi.

== Attractions ==
Oyano Island is home to the Amakusa Shiro Memorial Hall, a museum that documents the history of the Amakusa-Shimabara Rebellion of 1637.
