= Unzen-Amakusa National Park =

National Park in Kyūshū, Japan

- 雲仙天草国立公園
- IUCN category II (national park)
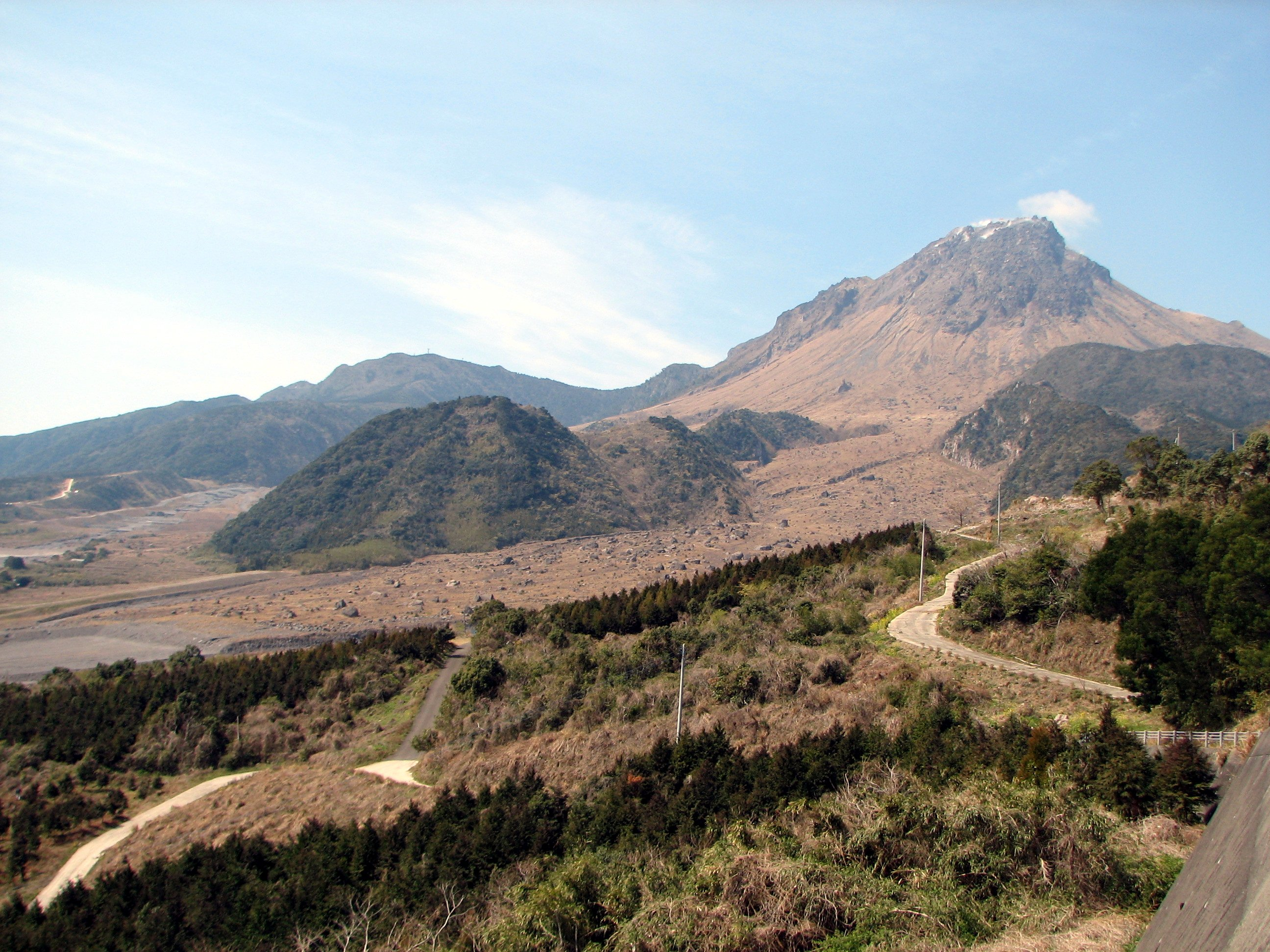
- Mount Unzen

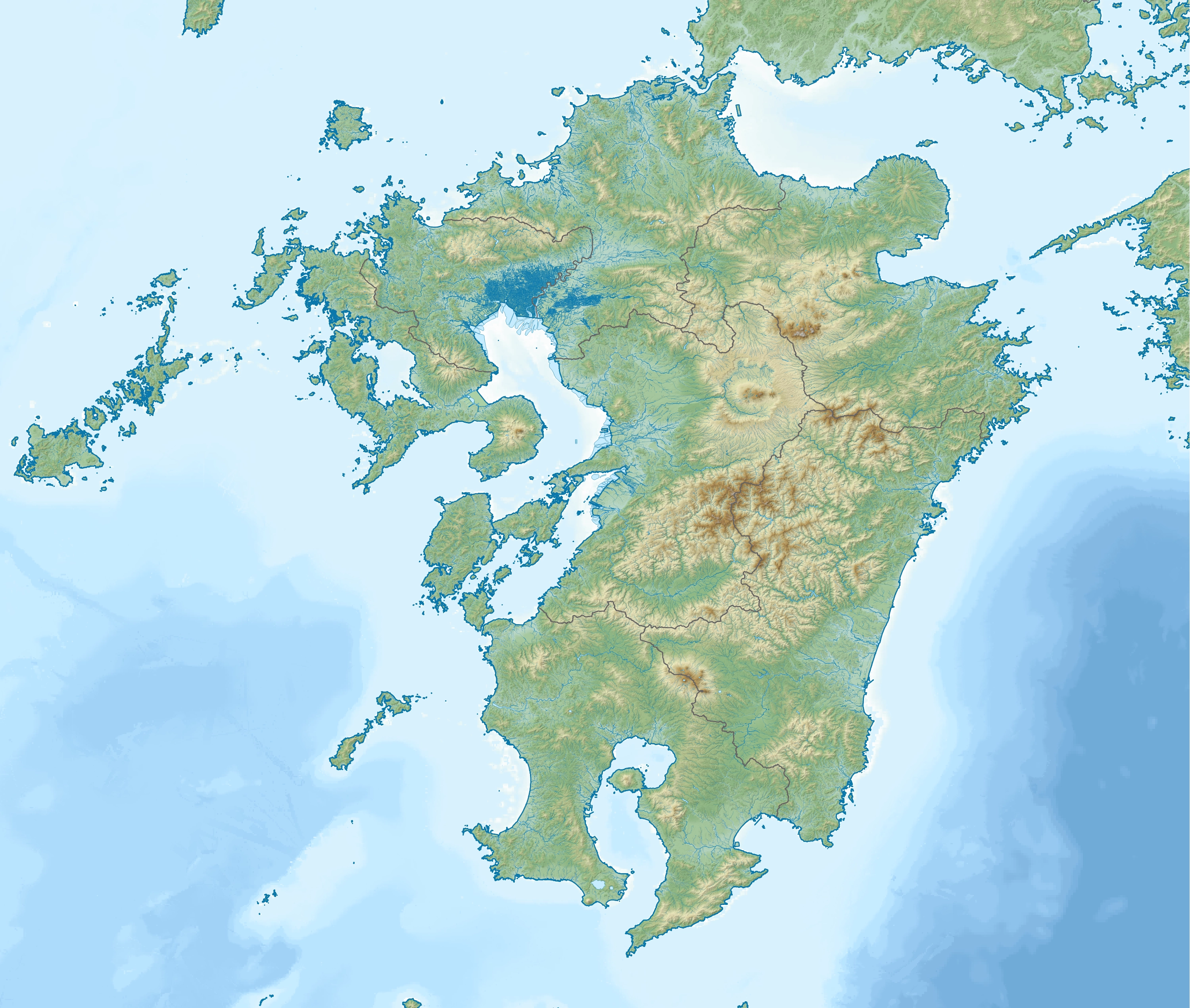
- Location within Kyushu Location within Japan
- Location: Kyūshū, Japan
- Coordinates: 32°45′00″N 130°16′00″E
- Area: 282.79 km^{2} (109.19 sq mi)
- Established: 16 March 1934
- Governing body: Ministry of the Environment (Japan)

Unzen-Amakusa National Park (雲仙天草国立公園, Unzen-Amakusa Kokuritsu Kōen) is a national park in Nagasaki, Kumamoto, and Kagoshima Prefectures, Japan. Established in 1934, the park derives its name from Mount Unzen, an active volcano at the middle of the Shimabara Peninsula, and the Amakusa islands in the Yatsushiro Sea. The area is closely connected to the early history of Christianity in Japan, and the park encompasses numerous areas related to Kakure Kirishitan.

== History ==
The park was established as the Unzen National Park in 1934 and, after extension, in 1956 renamed the Unzen-Amakusa National Park.

== Related municipalities ==
- Kagoshima: Nagashima
- Kumamoto: Amakusa, Kami-Amakusa, Reihoku
- Nagasaki: Minamishimabara, Shimabara, Unzen

== See also ==
- List of national parks of Japan
- Shimabara Rebellion
- Kakure Kirishitan
- Hidden Christian Sites in the Nagasaki Region
