= Japan National Route 323 =

Road in Saga prefecture, Japan

National Route 323
- 国道323号
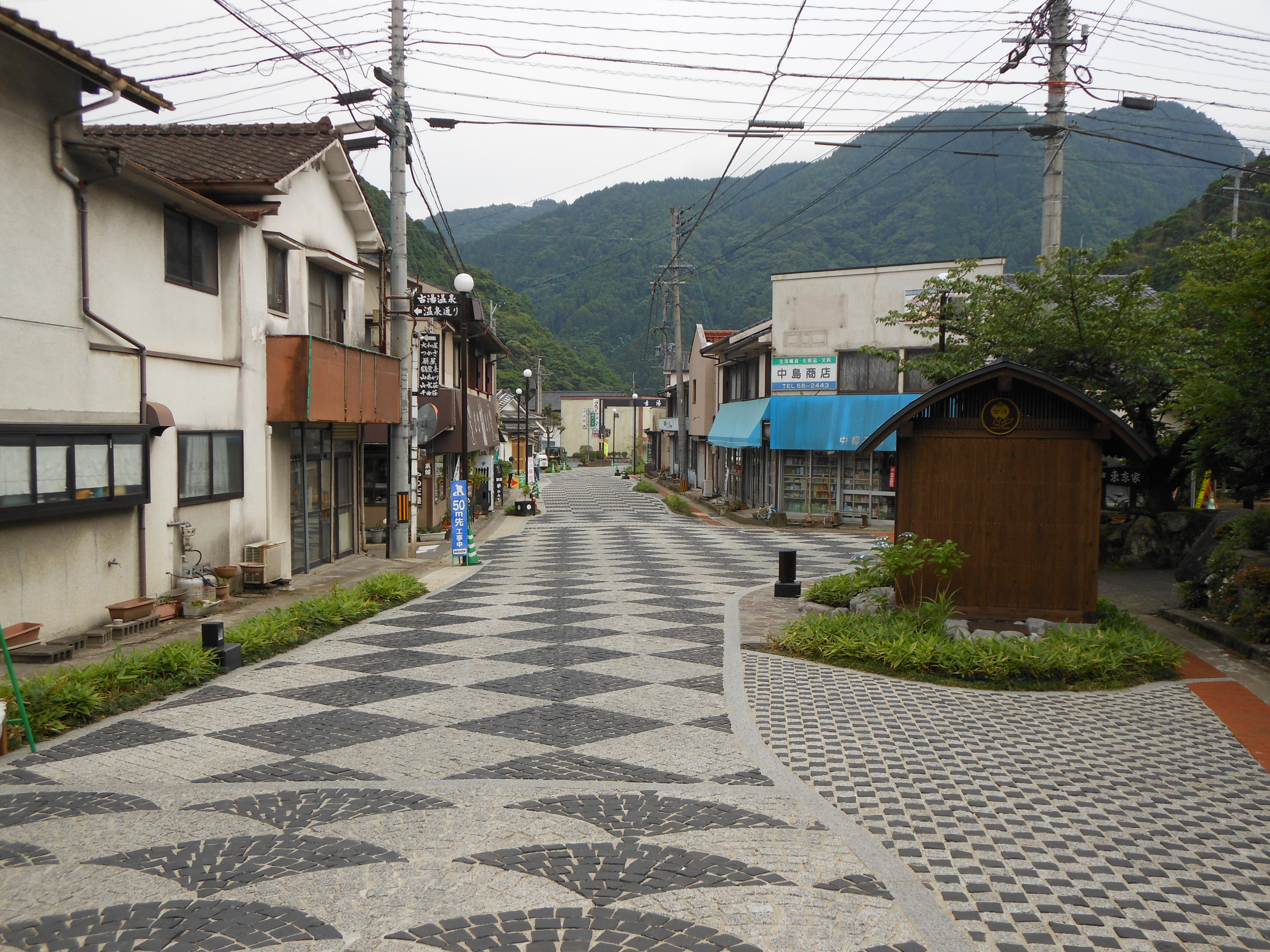

Route information
- Length: 46.8 km (29.1 mi)

Location
- Country: Japan

Highway system
- National highways of Japan; Expressways of Japan
← National Route 322	→ National Route 324

National Route 323 is a national highway of Japan connecting the cities of Saga and Karatsu in Saga prefecture in Japan, with a total length of 46.8 km (29.08 mi).
