= Azuma, Kagoshima =

Dissolved municipality in Kagoshima prefecture, Japan

Azuma (東町, Azuma-chō) was a town located in Izumi District, Kagoshima Prefecture, Japan.

As of 2003, the town had an estimated population of 7,091 and the density of 99.77 persons per km^{2}. The total area was 71.07 km^{2}.

On March 20, 2006, Azuma was merged into the expanded town of Nagashima and no longer exists as an independent municipality.
