= Ryugatake, Kumamoto =

Dissolved municipality in Kumamoto prefecture, Japan

Ryūgatake (龍ヶ岳町, Ryūgatake-machi) was a town located in Amakusa District, Kumamoto Prefecture, Japan.

== Population ==
As of 2003, the town had an estimated population of 4,904 and a density of 280.39 persons per km^{2}. The total area was 17.49 km^{2}.

== History ==
On March 31, 2004, Ryūgatake, along with the towns of Himedo, Matsushima and Ōyano (all from Amakusa District), was merged to create the city of Kami-Amakusa and no longer exists as an independent municipality.
