= Amakusa Airlines =

Regional airline of Japan

Amakusa Airlines Co., Ltd. 天草エアライン株式会社 Amakusa Earain Kabushiki-gaisha

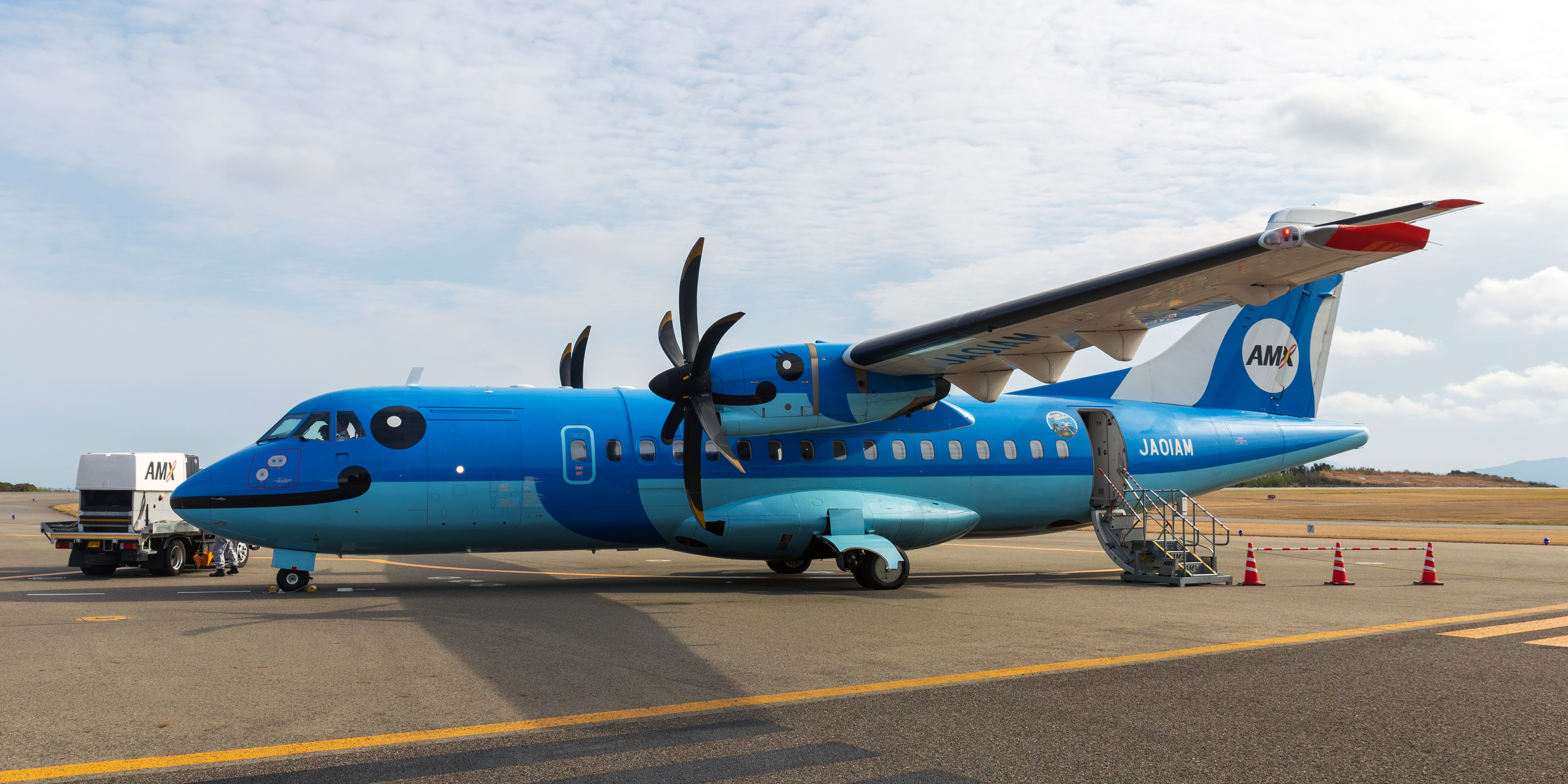
- Amakusa Airlines ATR 42-600 at Amakusa Airport
IATA	ICAO	Call sign
MZ	AHX	AMAKUSA AIR
- Founded: October 12, 1998; 27 years ago
- Commenced operations: March 23, 2000; 26 years ago
- Hubs: Amakusa Airfield
- Focus cities: Kumamoto Airport
- Fleet size: 1
- Destinations: 4
- Headquarters: Amakusa, Kumamoto Prefecture, Japan
- Key people: Toru Okushima (CEO)
- Website: www.amx.co.jp

Amakusa Airlines is a Japanese regional airline based in Amakusa, Kumamoto Prefecture, Japan. It operates regional services from and to Amakusa. Its main hub is Amakusa Airfield, with a focus city in Kumamoto Airport.

== History ==
The airline was established on 12 October 1998 and started operations on 23 March 2000, with services from Amakusa to Fukuoka and Kumamoto. It is owned by the municipal government (80% stake) and Japan Airlines. On 1 October 2004, it began service between Kumamoto and Matsuyama. On 18 April 2006, it cumulatively carried over 50,000 passengers. On 1 September 2008, it stopped the service between Kumamoto and Matsuyama. Three days later, on 4 September, it began the service between Kumamoto and Kobe. On 31 March 2010, it stopped the service between Kumamoto and Kobe.

In 2015 the airline took delivery of their ATR 42-600 as the first Japanese airline. The airplane went into service on 20 February 2016 after retiring their De Havilland Canada Dash 8-100 on 19 February 2016.

== Destinations ==
Amakusa Airlines serves the following destinations (as of May 2021):

City	Island	IATA	ICAO	Airport	Notes	Refs
Amakusa	Kyushu	AXJ	RJDA	Amakusa Airfield	Hub	
Fukuoka	Kyushu	FUK	RJFF	Fukuoka Airport		
Kobe	Honshu	UKB	RJBE	Kobe Airport	Terminated	
Kumamoto	Kyushu	KMJ	RJFT	Kumamoto Airport	Focus city	
Matsuyama	Shikoku	MYJ	RJOM	Matsuyama Airport	Terminated	
Osaka	Honshu	ITM	RJOO	Itami Airport		

=== Codeshare agreements ===
Amakusa Airlines codeshare with the following airlines:

- All Nippon Airways
- Japan Airlines

== Fleet ==
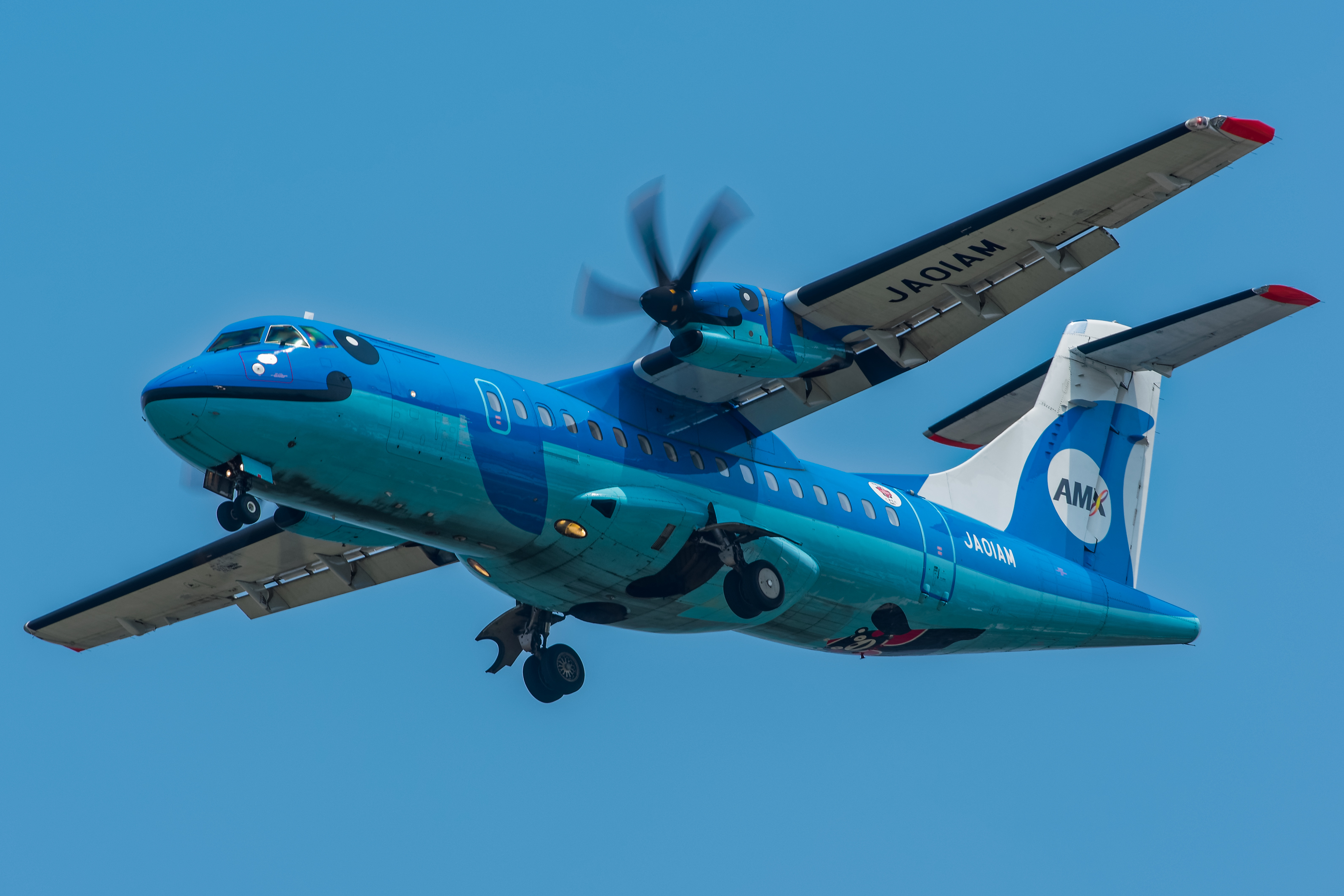
Amakusa Airlines ATR 42-600

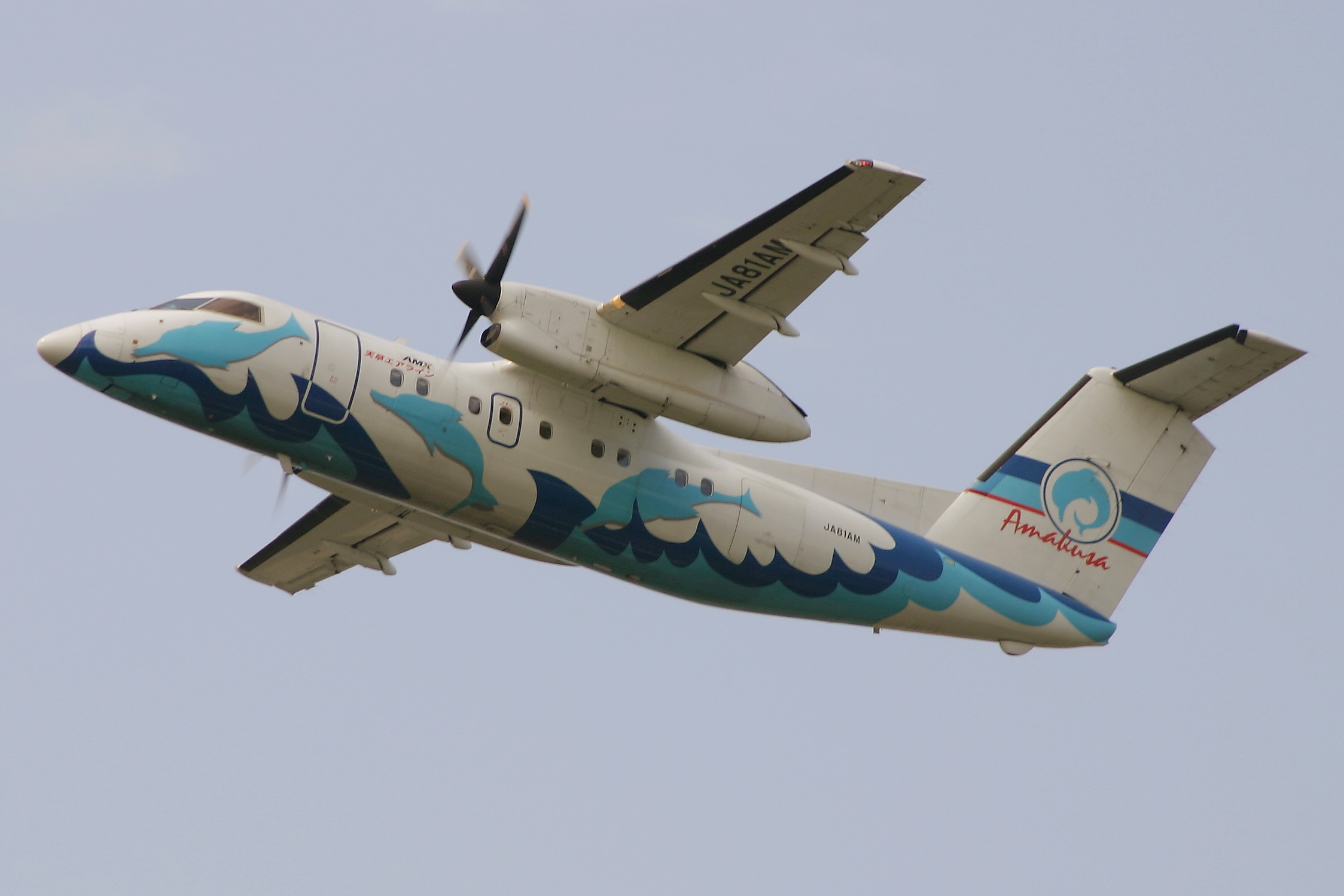
A former Amakusa Airlines Bombardier Dash 8-103 in the previous livery (2010).

=== Current fleet ===
As of July 2026, Amakusa Airlines operates the following aircraft:

Amakusa Airlines fleet
Aircraft	In fleet	On order	Passengers
ATR 42-600	1	0	48
Total	1	0	

=== Former fleet ===
As of August 2025, Amakusa Airlines operated 1 ATR 42-600.

In the past, Amakusa Airlines has previously operated the following aircraft types:

Aircraft	Total
De Havilland Canada Dash 8-100	1
Eurocopter Dauphin	1
