= Himedo, Kumamoto =

Dissolved municipality in Kumamoto prefecture, Japan

Himedo (姫戸町, Himedo-machi) was a town located in Amakusa District, Kumamoto Prefecture, Japan.

As of 2003, the town had an estimated population of 3,534 and a density of 182.73 persons per km^{2}. The total area was 19.34 km^{2}.

On March 31, 2004, Himedo, was merged with the towns of Matsushima, Ōyano and Ryūgatake (all from Amakusa District), was merged to create the city of Kami-Amakusa and no longer exists as an independent municipality.
