= Matsushima, Kumamoto =

Dissolved municipality in Kumamoto prefecture, Japan

Matsushima (松島町, Matsushima-machi) was a town located in Amakusa District, Kumamoto Prefecture, Japan.

As of 2003, the town had an estimated population of 8,711 and a density of 170.14 persons per km^{2}. The total area was 51.20 km^{2}.

On March 31, 2004, Matsushima, along with the towns of Himedo, Ōyano and Ryūgatake (all from Amakusa District), was merged to create the city of Kami-Amakusa and no longer exists as an independent municipality.
