= Amakusa Sea =

Sea area extending to the west of Shimoshima Island, Amakusa in Japan

Coordinates: 32°20′N 129°50′E

Location of Amakusa Nada

Amakusa Nada (Japanese: 天草灘) is a sea area extending to the west of Shimoshima Island, Amakusa in Japan.

It is bounded by Gotō Islands and cape Nomo in the north, and by Kuronoseto (黒ノ瀬戸) and Nagashima (長島海峡) straits in the south.
