= Five Bridges of Amakusa =

Road in Japan

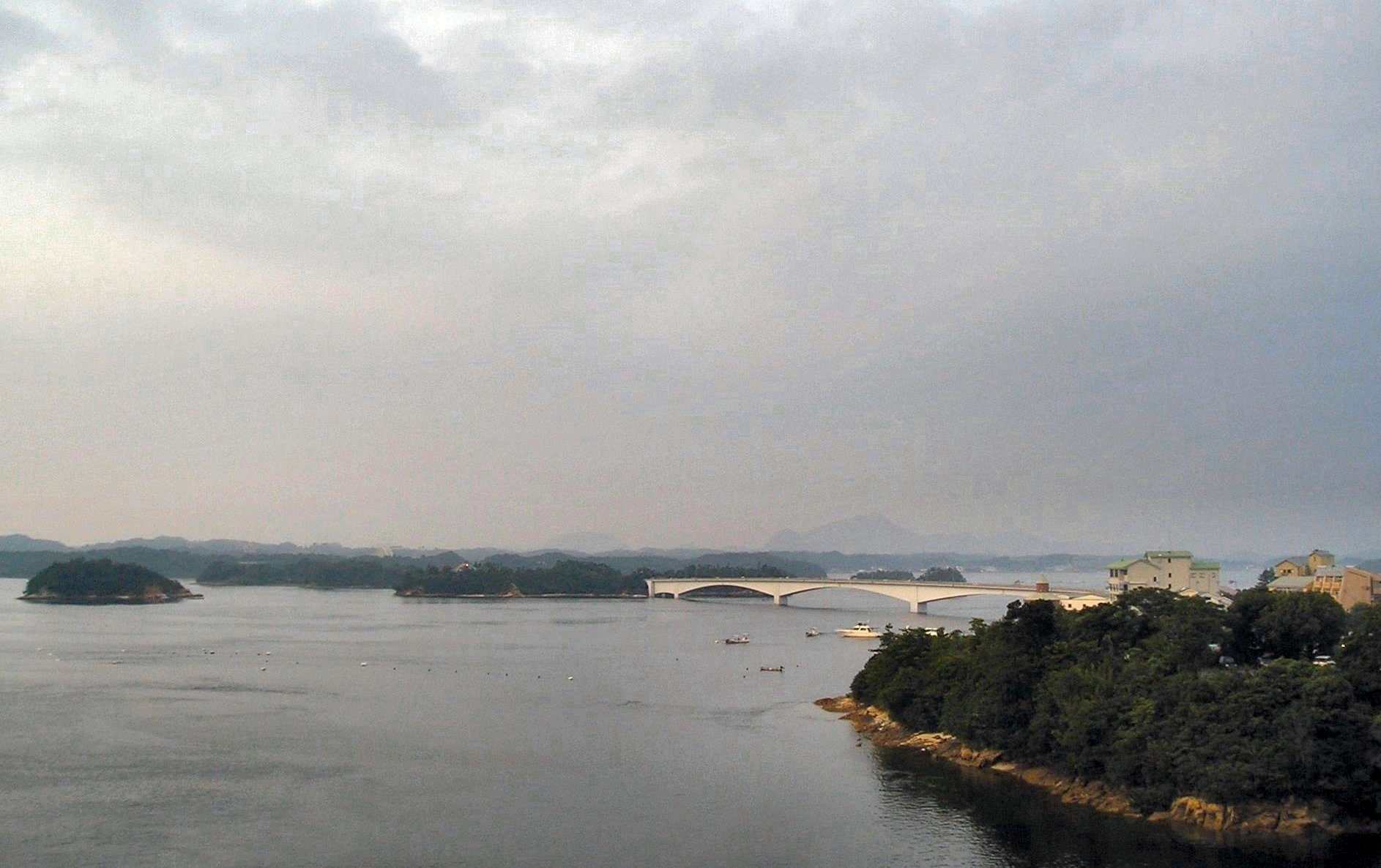
View of Amakusa islands, showing the Matsushima Bridge, connecting to Maeshima island.

Five Bridges of Amakusa (天草五橋, Amakusa Gokyō) are five road bridges in southern Japan, linking the Kyushu mainland (Kumamoto Prefecture) and the Amakusa Islands. The bridges connect the islands of Ōyano-jima, Nagaura-jima, Ike-jima, and Maeshima, and were completed on September 24, 1966. The Five Bridges gave hope and confidence in the development of Japan's bridge-construction technology, and changed the lives of those living at the Amakusa Islands (see survey below: Evaluation). Tourists come to view the area's scenery and many islands, and the roads are called the Amakusa Pearl Line, based on the products of cultured pearls.

== Significance ==
The completion of these bridges coincided with the popularization of automobiles in Japanese families, with the launch of the Nissan Sunny 1000cc series and the Toyota Corolla 1100cc series, foretelling the so-called "My Car" age. The Five Bridges started as toll roads and were expected to continue for 39 years, but the explosive motorization collected tolls much faster, and ended the payment after nine years (in 1975).

== Bridges ==
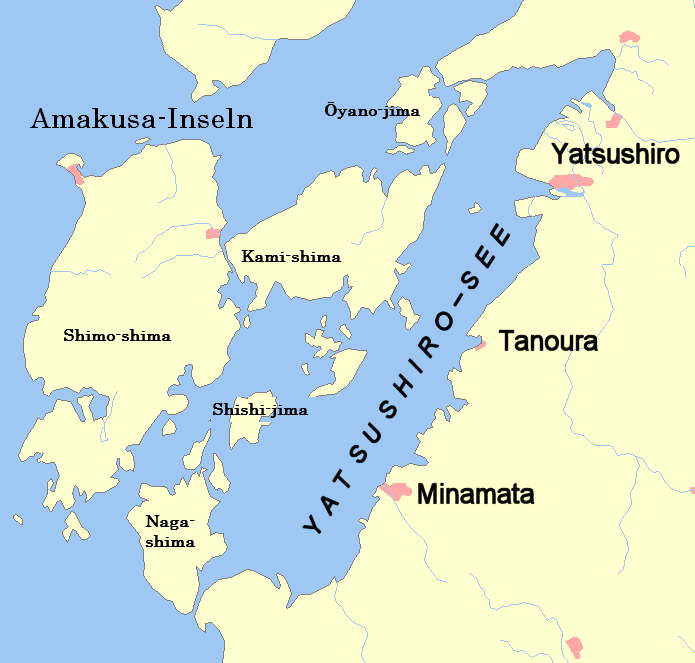
Map of islands with bridges.

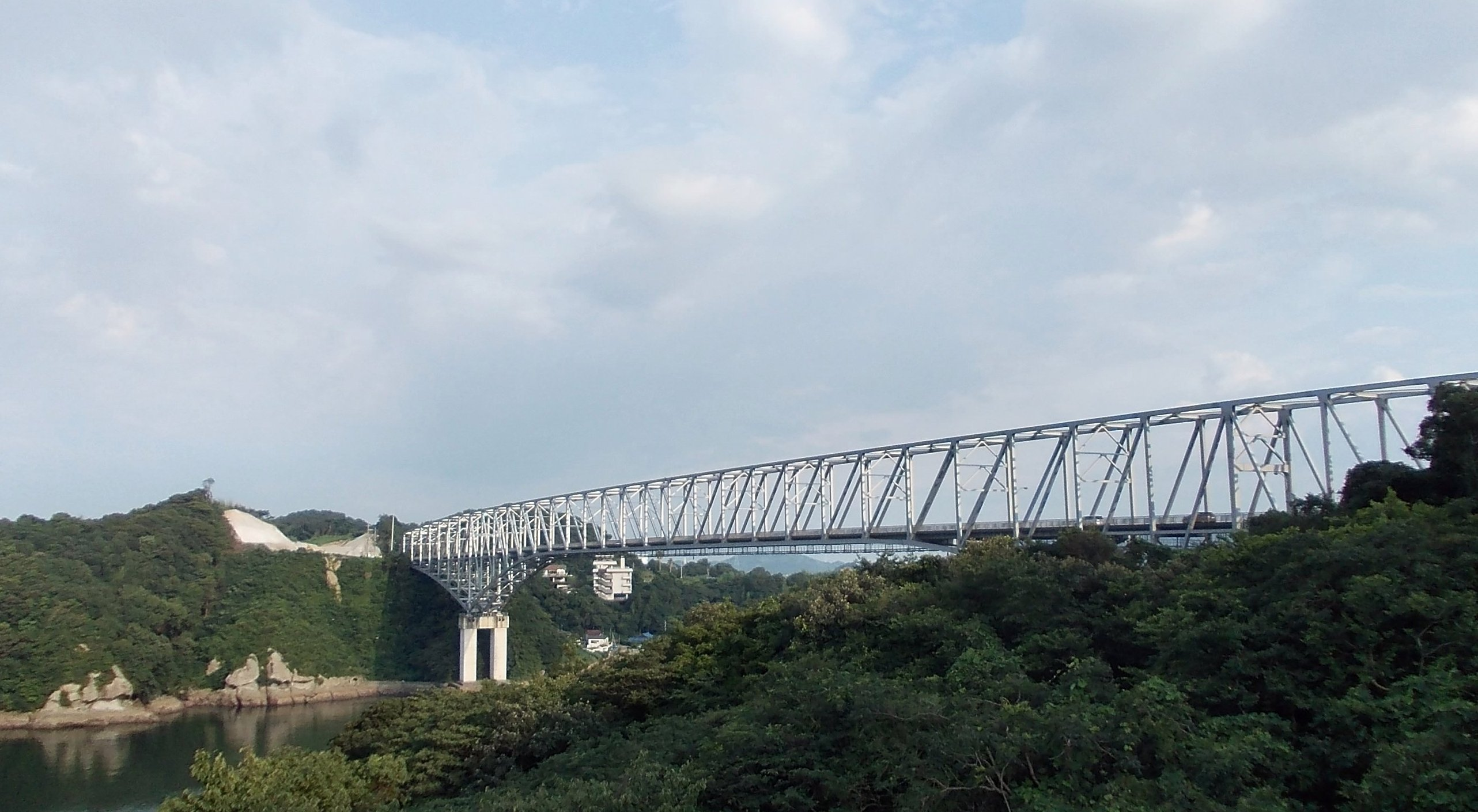
Tenmon Bridge

In Japanese, a bridge is known as a hashi, but when the word "hashi" is used after words, the forms "bashi" or "kyō" may be used instead, depending on the situation, sometimes interchangeably.

=== Tenmon Bashi (or Tenmon Kyō) ===
This bridge connects Misumi, the tip of the Uto Peninsula, Kumamoto Prefecture with Maeshima island. A continuous truss bridge of pearl color, it is 502 metres long (1,647 ft), 42 metres (138 ft) above sea level, and 6.5 metres wide (21 ft).

=== Ōyano Bashi ===
It connects Ōyano-jima and Nagaura-jima. It is a 249-by-17-metre high (817 ft × 56 ft high) Langer Truss bridge of pale yellow color.

=== Nakano Hashi ===
This bridge connects Nagaura-jima and Ooike-jima islands. It is a rigid-frame bridge, of concrete color, measuring 361 by 15 metres high (1,184 ft × 49 ft high).

=== Maeshima Bashi ===
This is a rigid-frame bridge of concrete color, connecting Ooike-jima and Maeshima. It is 520 by 9 metres high (1,706 ft × 30 ft high).

=== Matsushima Bashi (Hashi) ===
This is a pipe-arch bridge, painted in red, connecting Maeshima and Matsushimachō, Aizu, Kami-Amakusa. It is 178 metres long (584 ft), 17 metres high (56 ft), and 6.5 m wide (21 ft).

== History ==
The following are major events in the history of the bridges:

- 1936: Kumamoto Prefecture Assemblyman Jishu Mori (1890–1973) stated the need for bridges connecting Amakusa Islands and mainland of Kyushu.
- 1954: Kumamoto Prefecture started the investigation of Amakusa bridges.
- 1956: Japan Traffic Corporation also began investigation of Amakusa bridges.
- 1956: Japan Traffic Corporation created a branch for the construction of bridges.
- September 24, 1966: Service of the bridges started as a toll road.
- August 10, 1975: The payment as a toll road was discontinued.

== Evaluation ==
The road agency evaluated the construction of the Five bridges of Amakusa in 1976 (10 years later), by questionnaires. The results were:

- Traffic networks greatly improved. 93.4%
- Traffic accidents greatly increased. 93.2%
- Trade greatly increased. 75.6%
- Amakusa area greatly developed. 68.8%
- Public hazards increased. 67.9%
- Oneness of Kyushu and Amakusa. 65.4%
- Shopping became convenient. 60.3%
- Living conditions improved. 43.7%
- Toll road fares too high. 41.6% (toll road discontinued on August 10, 1975)
- Public morals deteriorated. 32.1%
- Income of people increased. 22.1%
- Oneness of Amakusa increased. 21.9%
- Increase of jobs. 16.3%
- Prices of commodities lowered. 10.2%

== See also ==
- History of Kumamoto Prefecture
