= Nagashima, Kagoshima =

Nagashima 長島町
- Town
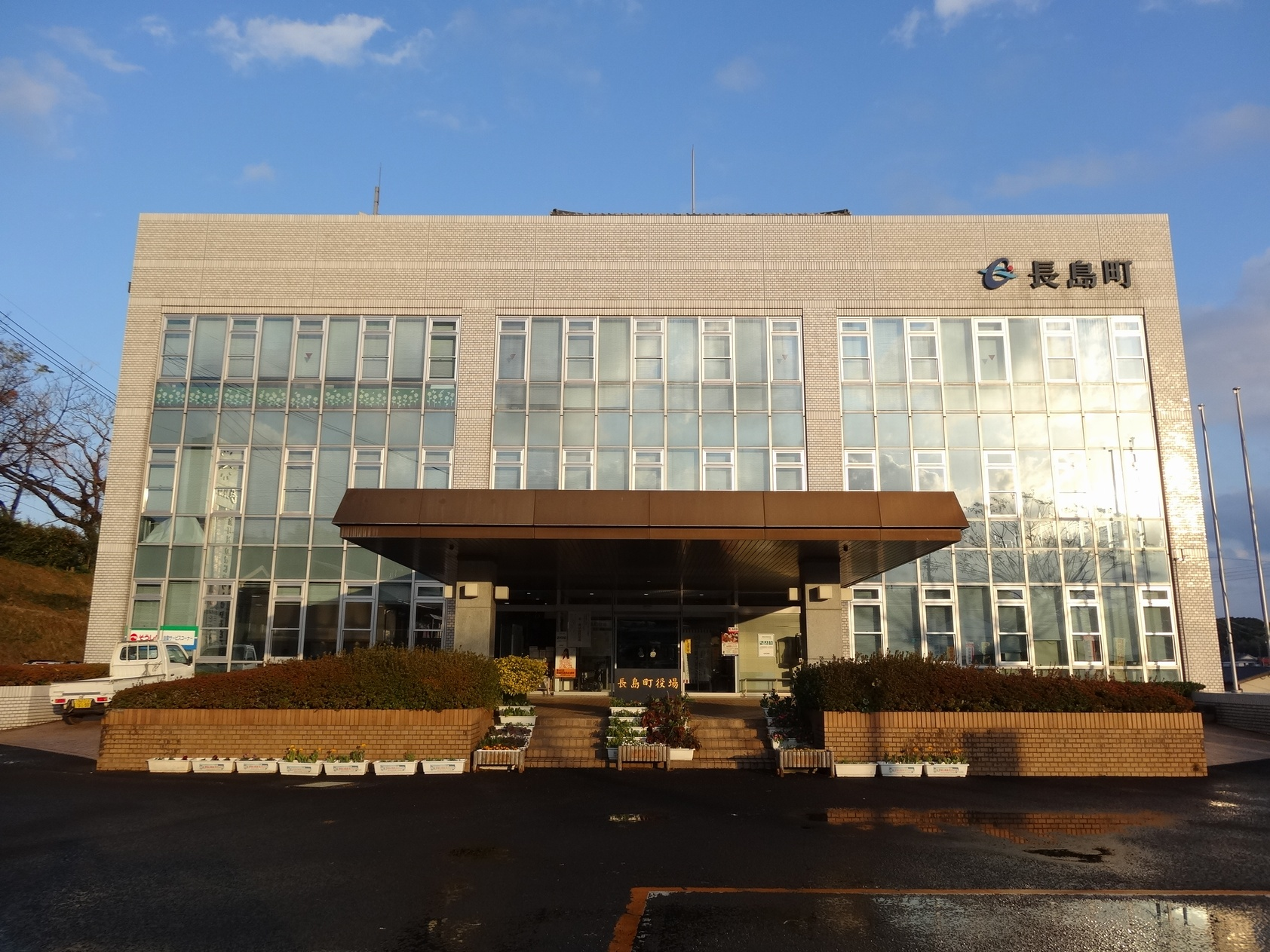
- Nagashima Hall

- Flag Seal
- Location of Nagashima in Kagoshima Prefecture

- Location in Japan
- Coordinates: 32°11′57″N 130°10′37″E
- Country: Japan
- Region: Kyushu
- Prefecture: Kagoshima
- District: Izumi

Area
  - Total: 116.19 km^{2} (44.86 sq mi)

Population (January 31, 2024)
  - Total: 9,618
  - Density: 82.78/km^{2} (214.4/sq mi)
- Time zone: UTC+09:00 (JST)
- City hall address: 1875 Takanosu, Nagashima-cho, Izumi-gun, Kagoshima-ken 899-1498
- Website: Official website
- Symbols
- Flower: Narcissus
- Tree: Camellia japonica

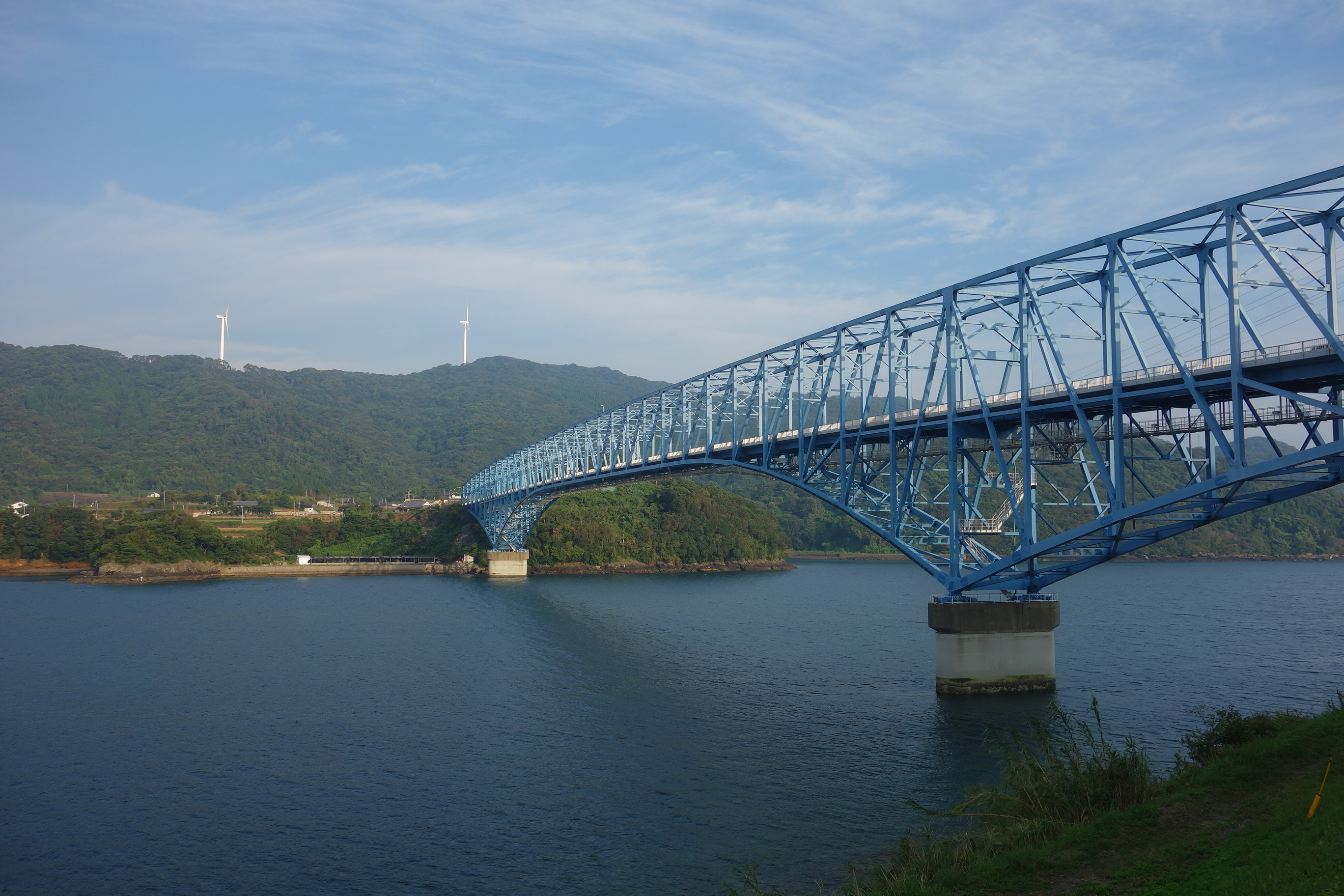
Kuronoseto Bridge

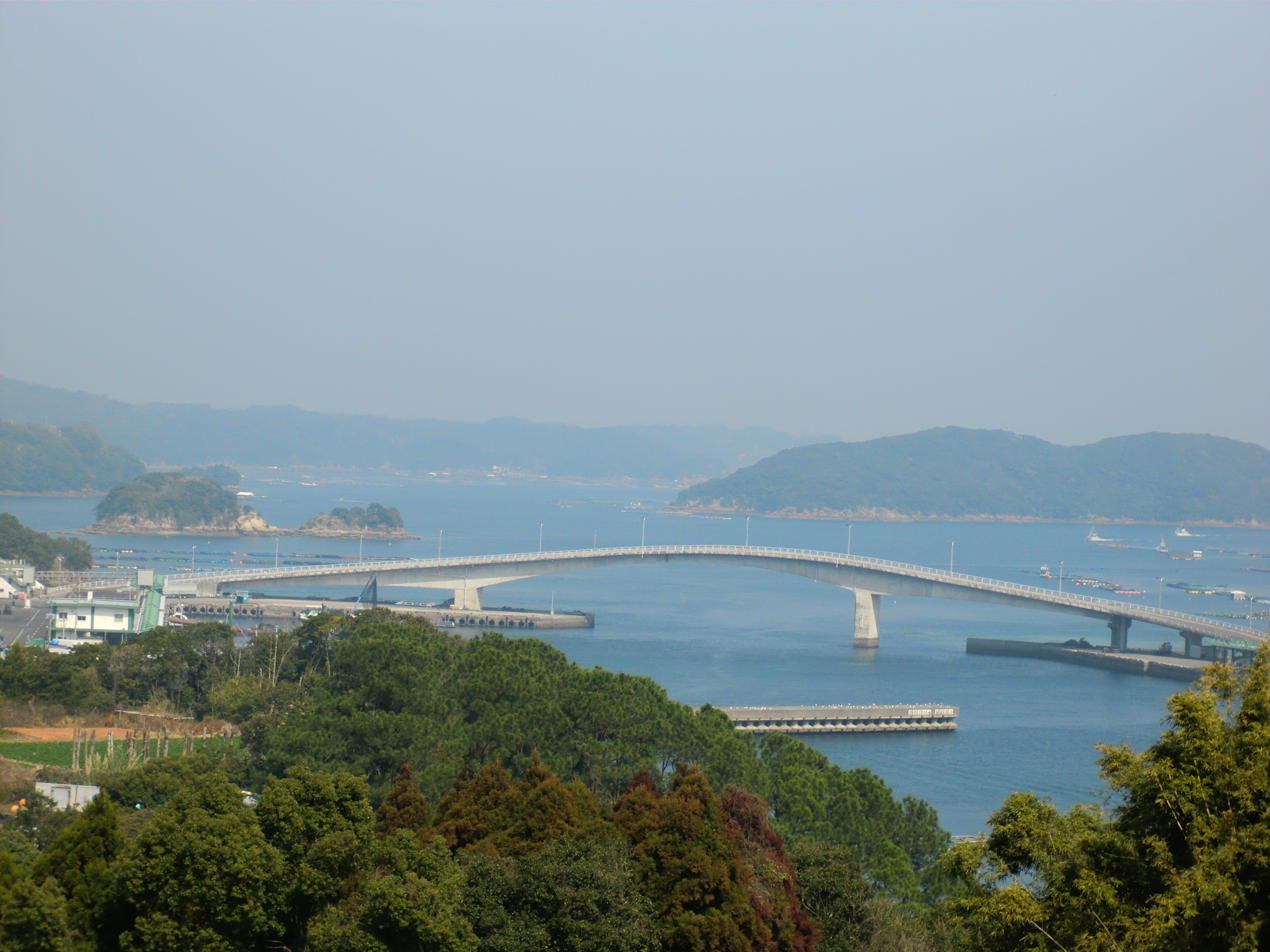
Takeshima Bridge

Nagashima (長島町, Nagashima-chō) is a town located in Izumi District, Kagoshima Prefecture, Japan. As of 31 January 2024, the town had an estimated population of 9618 in 4386 households, and a population density of 83 people per km^{2}. The total area of the town is 116.19 km^{2} (44.86 sq mi).

== Geography ==
Located in the northwestern tip of Kagoshima Prefecture, Nagashima consists of the entire area of Nagashima Island, comprising the majority of town area, and the inhabited islands of Morourajima, Ikarashijima, and Shishijima. It is located just south of Amakusa. The west coast faces the East China Sea, and the north and east coast the Yatsushiro Sea. The southern end is separated from Kyushu by the Kuronoseto Strait, which is about 300 meters wide, and is connected to (Akune City) on the opposite shore by the Kuronoseto Oohashi bridge.

=== Neighbouring municipalities ===
Kagoshima

- Akune

=== Climate ===
Nagashima has a humid subtropical climate (Köppen Cfa) characterized by warm summers and cool winters with light to no snowfall. The average annual temperature in Nagashima is 17.1 °C. The average annual rainfall is 2343 mm with September as the wettest month. The temperatures are highest on average in August, at around 26.9 °C, and lowest in January, at around 7.7 °C.

=== Demographics ===
Per Japanese census data, the population of Nagashima is as shown below:

Historical population
Year	Pop.	±%
1940	15,995	—
1950	22,050	+37.9%
1960	21,179	−4.0%
1970	15,929	−24.8%
1980	14,840	−6.8%
1990	13,801	−7.0%
2000	12,552	−9.1%
2010	11,105	−11.5%
2020	9,705	−12.6%

== History ==
Nagashima is originally within ancient Higo Province. In 778, a ship carrying Japanese envoys to the Tang Dynasty was washed ashore, and the place name Karakuma is still known from this event. During the Sengoku period the island came under the control of the Shimazu clan. At this time, the island was transferred from Higo Province to Satsuma Province. During the Edo period, it was part of Satsuma Domain. The villages of Higashinagashima and Nishinagashima were established with the creation of the modern municipalities system on April 1, 1889. Higashinagashima was elevated to town status on July 10, 1956, and renamed Azuma. Nishinagashima was raised to town status on January 1, 1960, and renamed Nagashimai. On March 20, 2006 - Nagashima merged with Azuma.

== Government ==
Nagashima has a mayor-council form of government with a directly elected mayor and a unicameral town council of 14 members. Nagashima, together with Akune contributes one member to the Kagoshima Prefectural Assembly. In terms of national politics, the town is part of the Kagoshima 3rd district of the lower house of the Diet of Japan.

== Economy ==
Nagashima is primarily a farming and fishing community. Nagashima's chief exports are sweet potatoes, shōchū, and yellowtail. Some of Kagoshima's most well known shōchū is distilled in Nagashima. Such brands include Shimabijin (Beautiful Islander), Shimaotome (Island maiden), Shimamusume (Island Daughter), and DanDan ("thank you" in Kagoshima dialect).

== Education ==
Nagashima has nine public elementary schools and five public junior high schools by the town government. The town does not have a high school.

== Transportation ==
=== Railways ===
The town does not have any passenger railway service. The nearest train station is Izumi Station on the JR Kyushu Kyushu Shinkansen and the Hisatsu Orange Railway Hisatsu Orange Railway Line.

=== Highways ===
- National Route 389

== Local attractions ==
- Gyōnindake (traveler's mountain) has view of Amakusa and some of the smaller islands around Nagashima.
- Hotel Nagashima has an Onsen center
- A Jōmon era tomb which celebrates an annual festival

== See also ==
- Nagashima Island, Kagoshima
