= Amakusa Airfield =

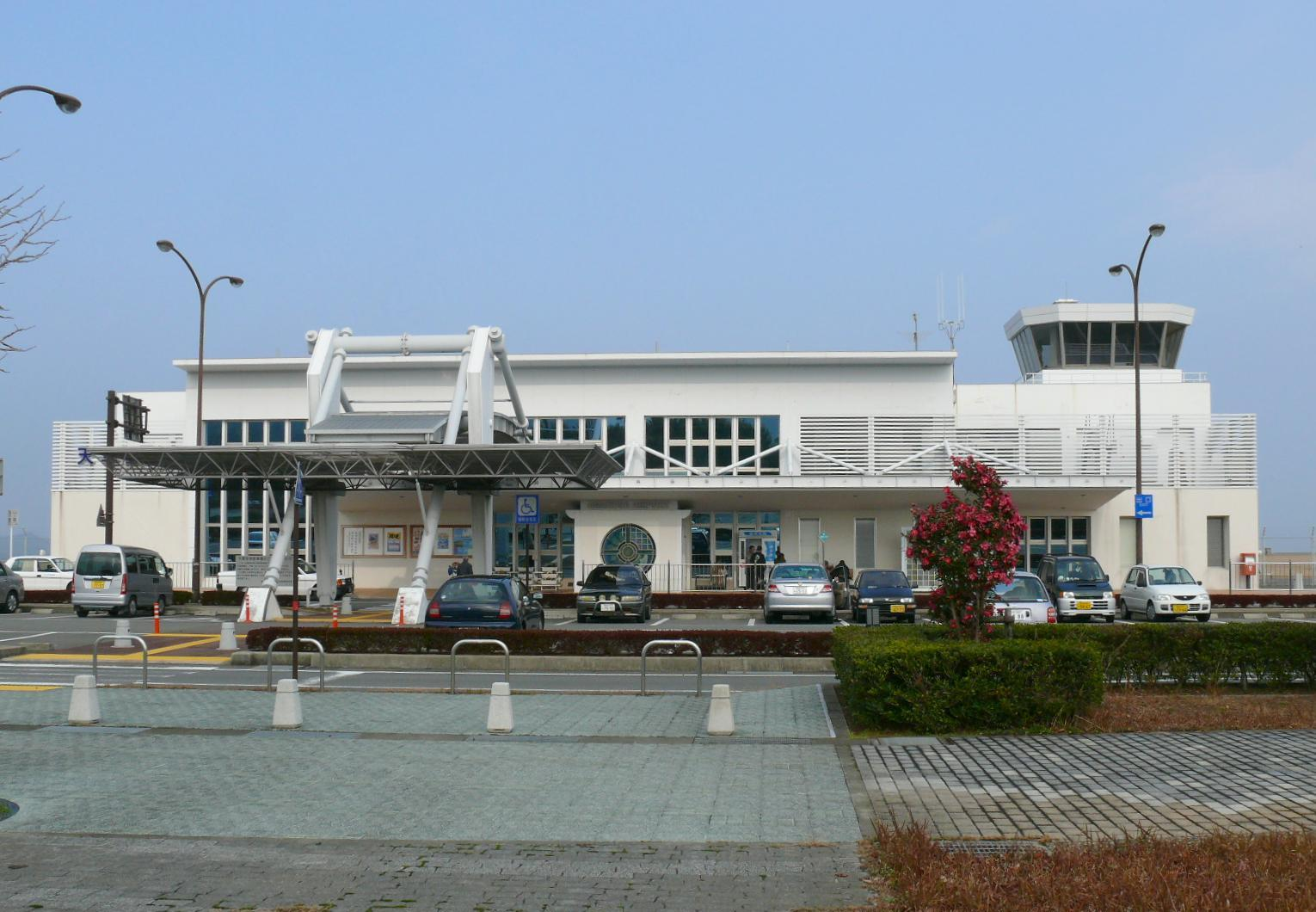
- Amakusa Airfield terminal building
- IATA: AXJ; ICAO: RJDA

Summary
- Airport type: Public
- Owner: Kumamoto Prefecture government
- Serves: Amakusa
- Hub for: Amakusa Airlines
- Elevation AMSL: 340 ft / 104 m
- Coordinates: 32°28′56″N 130°09′32″E
- Website: pref.kumamoto.jp

Map
- Location in Kumamoto Prefecture Location in Japan

Runways
Direction	Length		Surface
Direction	m	ft	Surface
13/31	1,000	3,281	Asphalt concrete

Statistics (2014)
- Passengers: 62,759
- Cargo (metric tonnes): 2
- Source: Japanese AIP at AIS Japan; Osaka Ministry of Land, Infrastructure and Transport Civil Aviation Bureau

Amakusa Airfield (天草飛行場) is an airport 2.3 NM (4.3 km; 2.6 mi) northwest of Amakusa, Kumamoto, Japan, on the Amakusa Islands (IATA: AXJ, ICAO: RJDA) in Japan. Locals often refer to it as Amakusa Airport. It is on the northern side of the Amakusa Islands, northwest of Amakusa city. It is used by only one airline, Amakusa Airlines, which is based there.

== History ==
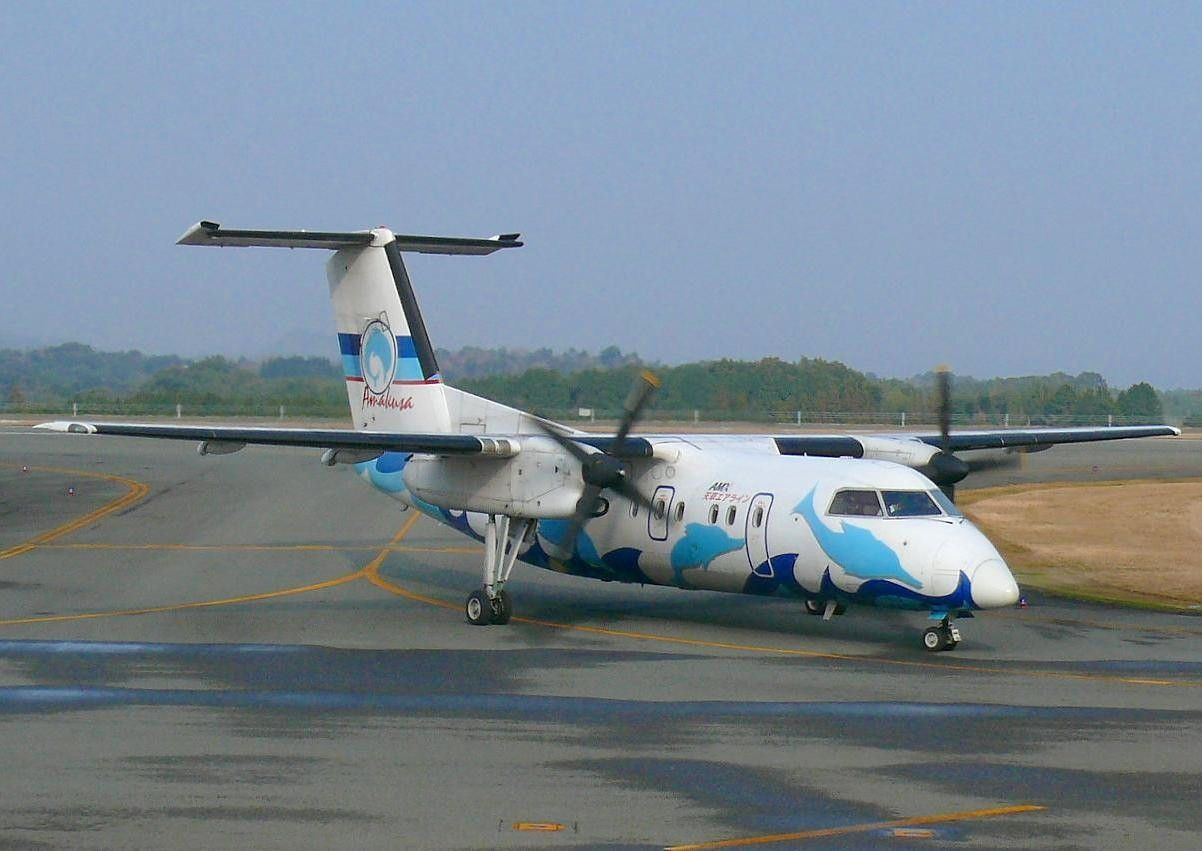
DHC-8-103 of Amakusa Airlines taxiing at Amakusa Airfield

On September 6, 1982, the governor of Kumamoto Prefecture announced plans for a small airport during a regular press conference. On December 26, 1990, the Ministry of Land, Infrastructure and Transport approved the construction of the airfield. Construction began in 1992. The first plane that landed at this airport was a DHC-8 of Amakusa Airlines on November 19, 1999. The airfield was opened for public use on March 23, 2000.

In the spring of 2000, it had round trips between Amakusa Islands and Kumamoto twice a day. Starting from December 1, 2005, the operating time was extended from (8:00 am ～ 7:00 pm) to (7:40 am ～ 8:30 pm). It now has three round trips between Amakusa Airfield and Fukuoka Airport and one round trip between Amakusa Airfield and Kumamoto Airport (also one round trip between Kumamoto Airport and Kobe Airport) per day while using the same aircraft. Since this airfield is served only by Amakusa Airlines and this airline only has one aircraft, the ATR 72 is the only regularly scheduled aircraft that uses this airfield.

== Airlines and destinations ==
=== Passenger ===
Airlines	Destinations
Amakusa Airlines	Fukuoka, Kumamoto

== Airport communications ==
- Air / Ground (130.775 MHz)

== Runway information ==
Operations and Statistics
Passenger movements
2001	83,654	2007	73,410
2002	83,868	2008	60,086
2003	76,161	2009	70,138
2004	76,123	2010	70,138
2005	72,866	2011
2006	74,847
Airfreight movements in tonnes
2001	0	2007	6
2002	0	2008	4
2003	3	2009	2
2004	3	2010
2005	3	2011
2006	7
Aircraft movements
2001	1,914	2007	2,033
2002	1,850	2008	1,896
2003	1,842	2009	1,559
2004	1,723	2010
2005	1,679	2011
2006	1,859

Landings are made using VOR/DME approach on runway 13/31. The airport has a single runway, 13/31, which is 1,000 m × 30 m (3,281 ft × 98 ft) and is constructed of asphalt concrete. The lighting systems on runway 13/31 are High Intensity Runway Lights, Runway End Identification Lights, and Precision Approach Path Indicator (PAPI).

== Airport facilities ==
- 1st Floor
  - Information Office
  - Departure
  - Arrival Lobby
  - Amakusa Airlines Headquarters
  - Washrooms
  - Breast-feeding room
  - Tourist Information
  - Shop
  - Taxi bus
- 2nd Floor
  - Observation deck
  - Administration Office

== Ground transport ==
All ground transport is located on the first floor.

=== Bus ===
Kyushu Sanko Bus (九州産交バス) operate bus routes from airport to Amakusa city.

=== Road ===
The airport is connected by Kumamoto Prefecture Amakusa Highway No.334 and Itsuwa Road No.47.
