= Kami-Amakusa =

Kamiamakusa 上天草市
- City
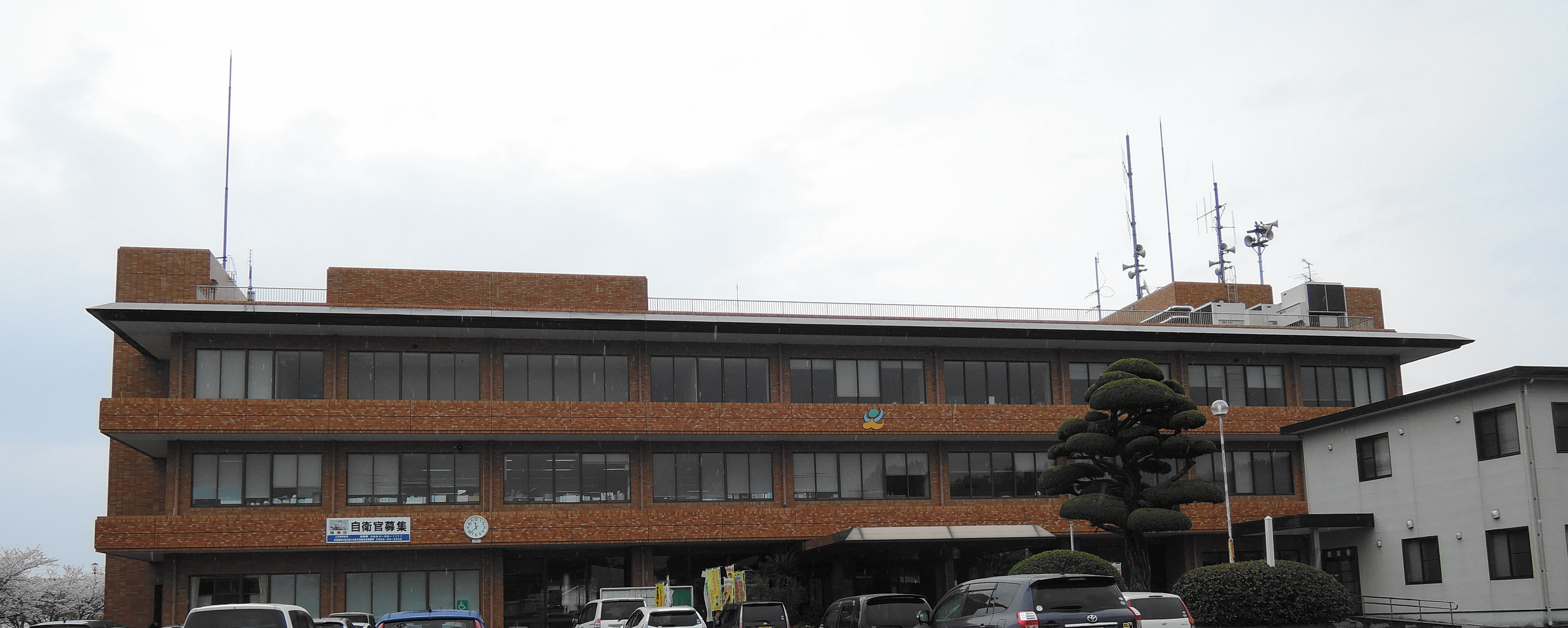
- Kamiamakusa City hall

- Flag Emblem
- Interactive map of Kamiamakusa
- Location in Japan
- Coordinates: 32°35′15″N 130°25′50″E
- Country: Japan
- Region: Kyushu
- Prefecture: Kumamoto

Area
  - Total: 126.67 km^{2} (48.91 sq mi)

Population (July 31, 2024)
  - Total: 23,824
  - Density: 188.08/km^{2} (487.12/sq mi)
- Time zone: UTC+09:00 (JST)
- City hall address: 1514 Oyano-cho Kami, Kamiamakusa-shi, Kumamoto-ken 869-3692
- Climate: Cfa
- Website: Official website
- Symbols
- Bird: Warbling white-eye
- Flower: Sakura
- Tree: Pine

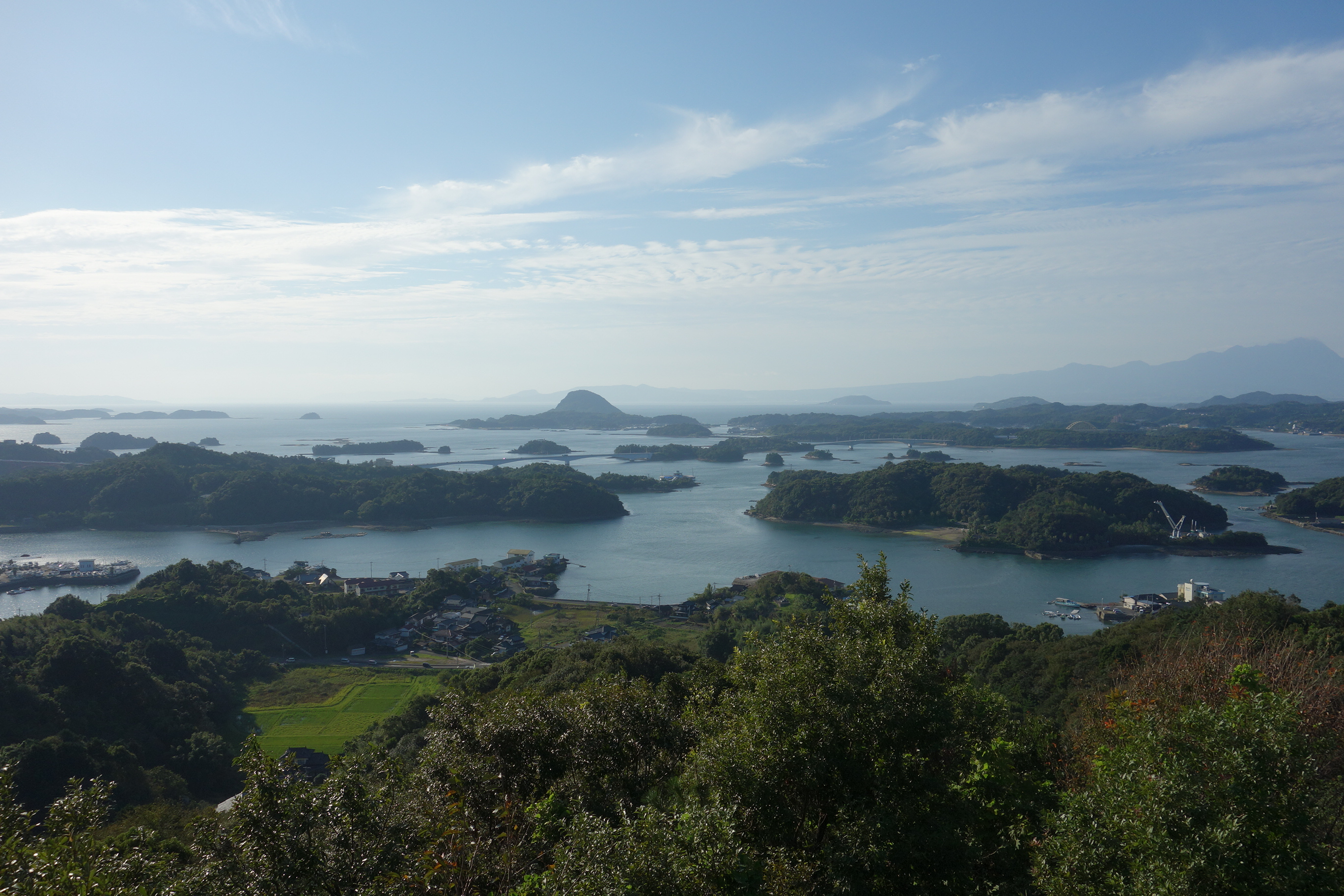
Amakusa Matsushima

Kamiamakusa (上天草市, Kamiamakusa-shi) is a city located in Kumamoto Prefecture, Japan. As of 31 July 2024, the city had an estimated population of 23,824 in 11085 households, and a population density of 190 persons per km^{2}. The total area of the city is 126.67 km^{2} (48.91 sq mi).

== Geography ==
Kamiamakusa covers the western coast of one of the two main islands, Kamishima (上島, "Upper Island") and ten smaller inhabited islands (including Ōyano-jima) and numerous uninhabited islets located the central-west Kumamoto Prefecture, in between the Yatsushiro Sea and the East China Sea. Parts of the city are within the borders of the Unzen-Amakusa National Park.

=== Neighboring municipalities ===
Kumamoto Prefecture

- Amakusa
- Uki

=== Climate ===
Kamiamakusa has a humid subtropical climate (Köppen climate classification Cfa) with hot, humid summers and cool winters. There is significant precipitation throughout the year, especially during June and July. The average annual temperature in Kamiamakusa is 16.8 °C (62.2 °F). The average annual rainfall is 2,019.9 mm (79.52 in) with June as the wettest month. The temperatures are highest on average in August, at around 27.5 °C (81.5 °F), and lowest in January, at around 6.5 °C (43.7 °F). The highest temperature ever recorded in Kamiamakusa was 38.0 °C (100.4 °F) on 3 August 2026; the coldest temperature ever recorded was −6.5 °C (20.3 °F) on 25 January 2016.

Climate data for Matsushima, Kamiamakusa (1991−2020 normals, extremes 1977−present)
Month	Jan	Feb	Mar	Apr	May	Jun	Jul	Aug	Sep	Oct	Nov	Dec	Year
Record high °C (°F)	21.3 (70.3)	24.0 (75.2)	26.2 (79.2)	29.0 (84.2)	32.4 (90.3)	34.6 (94.3)	37.4 (99.3)	38.0 (100.4)	36.4 (97.5)	31.7 (89.1)	28.9 (84.0)	25.6 (78.1)	38.0 (100.4)
Mean daily maximum °C (°F)	10.5 (50.9)	11.9 (53.4)	15.4 (59.7)	20.4 (68.7)	24.7 (76.5)	27.1 (80.8)	31.0 (87.8)	32.4 (90.3)	29.1 (84.4)	24.1 (75.4)	18.3 (64.9)	12.8 (55.0)	21.5 (70.6)
Daily mean °C (°F)	6.5 (43.7)	7.4 (45.3)	10.6 (51.1)	15.1 (59.2)	19.3 (66.7)	22.7 (72.9)	26.6 (79.9)	27.5 (81.5)	24.4 (75.9)	19.3 (66.7)	13.7 (56.7)	8.6 (47.5)	16.8 (62.3)
Mean daily minimum °C (°F)	2.3 (36.1)	2.9 (37.2)	5.8 (42.4)	10.1 (50.2)	14.6 (58.3)	19.2 (66.6)	23.2 (73.8)	23.8 (74.8)	20.7 (69.3)	15.1 (59.2)	9.5 (49.1)	4.4 (39.9)	12.6 (54.7)
Record low °C (°F)	−6.5 (20.3)	−5.6 (21.9)	−2.9 (26.8)	−0.4 (31.3)	5.5 (41.9)	10.9 (51.6)	16.3 (61.3)	17.5 (63.5)	9.2 (48.6)	4.6 (40.3)	−0.6 (30.9)	−3.9 (25.0)	−6.5 (20.3)
Average precipitation mm (inches)	70.6 (2.78)	90.9 (3.58)	122.8 (4.83)	145.4 (5.72)	158.7 (6.25)	416.7 (16.41)	352.7 (13.89)	199.4 (7.85)	177.8 (7.00)	106.2 (4.18)	95.6 (3.76)	74.1 (2.92)	2,019.9 (79.52)
Average precipitation days (≥ 1.0 mm)	8.4	8.9	11.1	10.0	9.4	14.9	12.4	10.5	9.7	6.9	8.4	8.2	118.8
Mean monthly sunshine hours	129.1	139.4	169.3	185.0	193.1	127.2	191.9	222.5	183.2	188.8	151.1	137.3	2,018
Source: Japan Meteorological Agency

== Demographics ==
Per Japanese census data, the population of Kamiamakusa in 2020 is 24,563 people. Kamiamakusa has been conducting censuses since 1920.

Historical population

Year	Pop.	±%
1920	39,984	—
1925	39,622	−0.9%
1930	41,036	+3.6%
1935	42,157	+2.7%
1940	41,103	−2.5%
1945	54,951	+33.7%
1950	55,050	+0.2%
1955	53,921	−2.1%
1960	51,439	−4.6%
1965	47,914	−6.9%
1970	42,136	−12.1%

Year	Pop.	±%
1975	41,541	−1.4%
1980	40,682	−2.1%
1985	39,900	−1.9%
1990	38,316	−4.0%
1995	36,667	−4.3%
2000	35,314	−3.7%
2005	32,502	−8.0%
2010	29,901	−8.0%
2015	27,006	−9.7%
2020	24,563	−9.0%

Kami-Amakusa population statistics

== History ==
The area of Kamiamakusa was part of ancient Higo Province, During the Edo Period it was tenryō territory under direct control of the Tokugawa shogunate and administered from the office of the Nagasaki bugyō.

The city of Kamiamakusa was established on March 31, 2004, from the merger of the towns of Himedo, Matsushima, Ōyano and Ryūgatake (all from Amakusa District).

== Government ==
Kamiamakusa has a mayor-council form of government with a directly elected mayor and a unicameral city council of 16 members. Kamiamakusa contributes one member to the Kumamoto Prefectural Assembly. In terms of national politics, the city is part of the Kumamoto 4th district of the lower house of the Diet of Japan.

== Economy ==
Kamiamakusa has a mixed economy dominated by agriculture, commercial fishing and light manufacturing. Tourism also plays a major role.

== Education ==
Kamiamakusa has 11 public elementary schools and six public junior high schools operated by the city government and one public high school operated by the Kumamoto Prefectural Board of Education.

== Transportation ==
=== Railways ===
Kamiamakusa has no passenger railway service. The nearest train station is Misumi Station on the JR Kyushu Misumi Line in Uki City.

=== Highways ===
- National Route 266
- National Route 324

== Local attractions ==
- Five Bridges of Amakusa
- Unzen-Amakusa National Park

== Notable people from Kamiamakusa ==
- Amakusa Shirō - The leader of the Shimabara Rebellion in 1638.
