= Japan National Route 266 =

Road in Kumamoto prefecture, Japan

National Route 266
- 国道266号
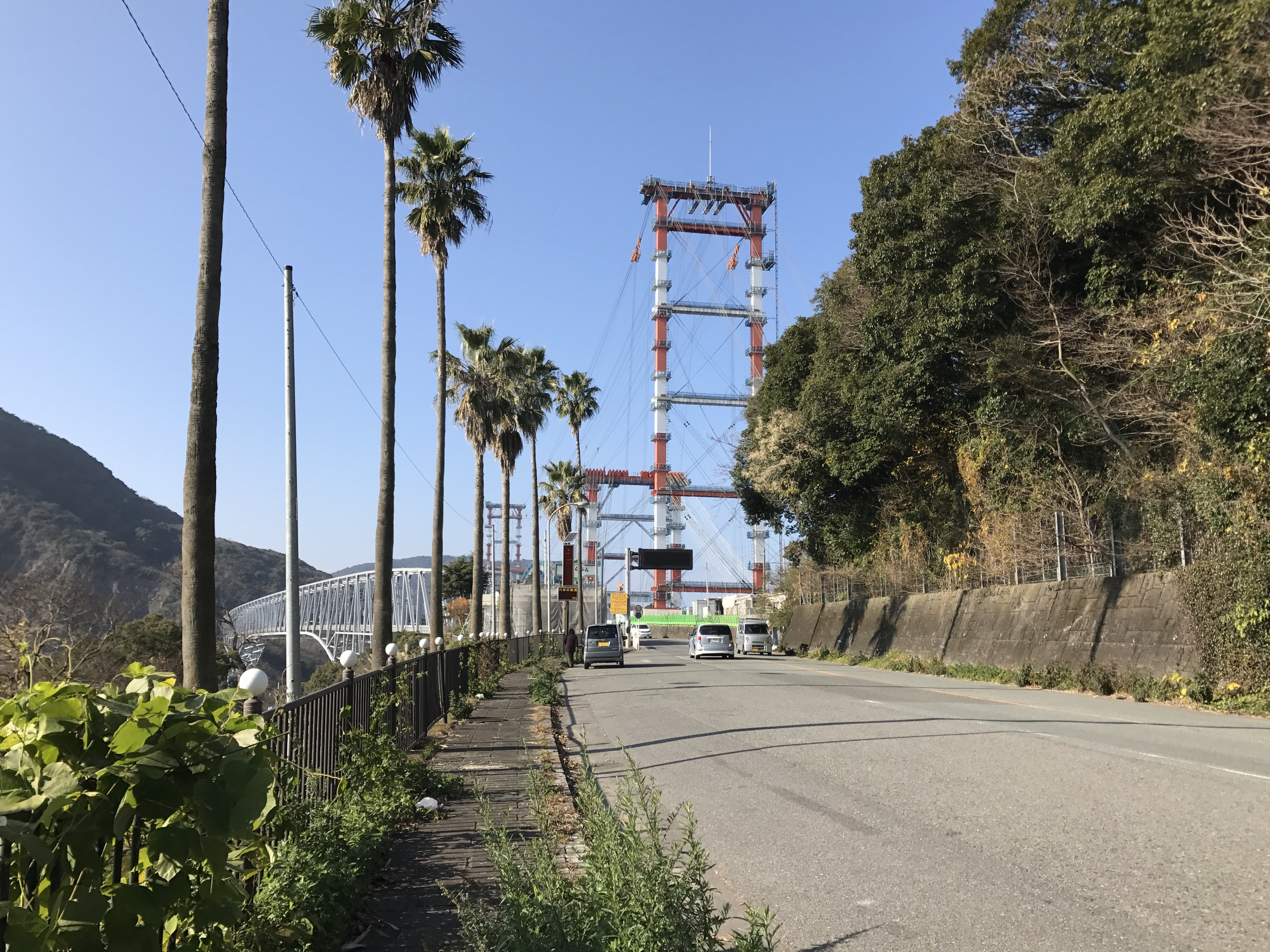

Route information
- Length: 155.3 km (96.5 mi)

Location
- Country: Japan

Highway system
- National highways of Japan; Expressways of Japan
← National Route 265	→ National Route 267

National Route 266 is a national highway of Japan connecting Amakusa, Kumamoto and Chūō-ku, Kumamoto in Japan, with a total length of 155.3 km (96.5 mi).

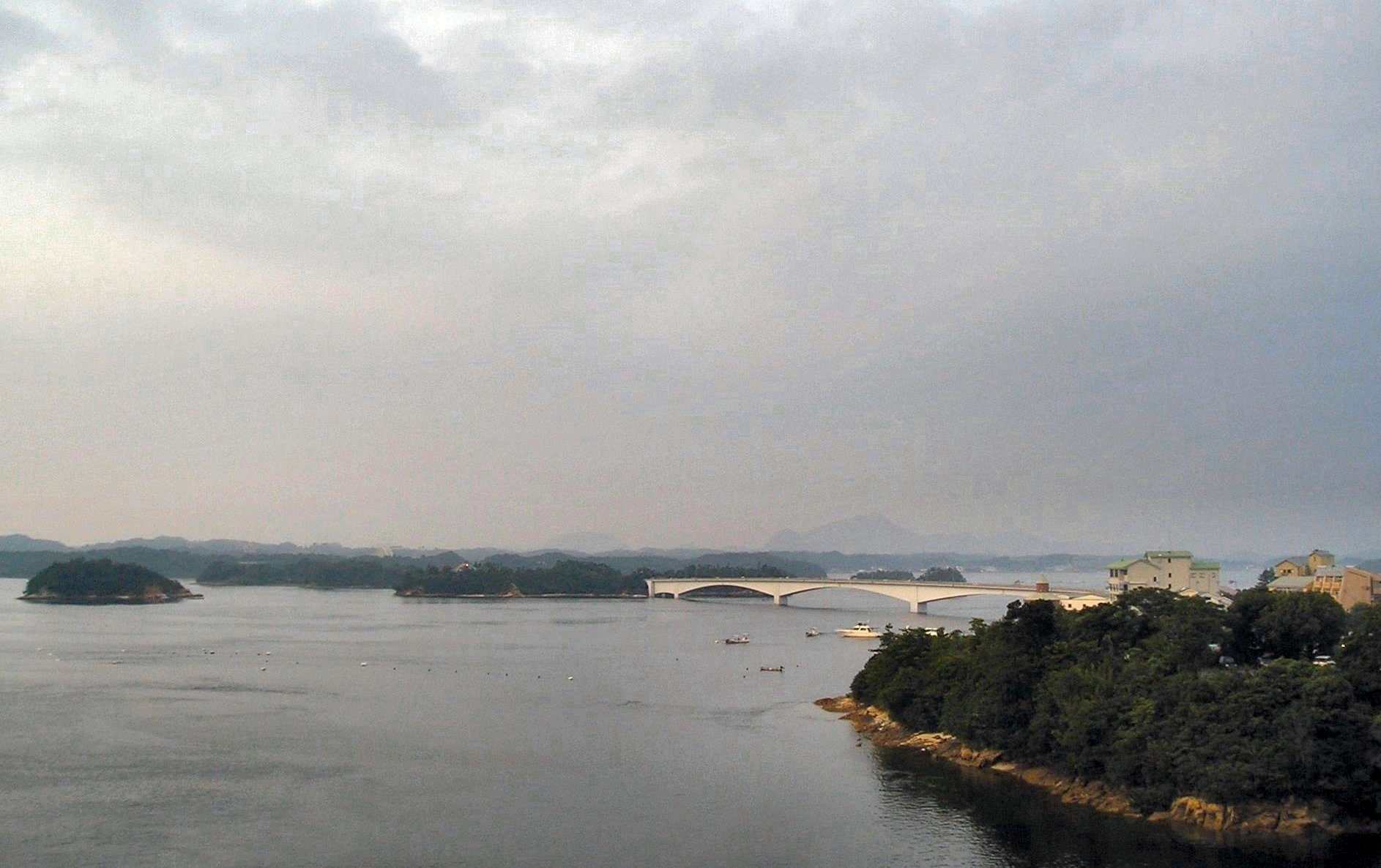
Amakusa Pearl Line-the Maeshima No.4 Bridge, Kami-Amakusa, Kumamoto
