= Japan National Route 324 =

Road in Japan

National Route 324
- 国道324号

Route information
- Length: 84.4 km (52.4 mi)

Location
- Country: Japan

Highway system
- National highways of Japan; Expressways of Japan
← National Route 323	→ National Route 325

National Route 324 is a national highway of Japan connecting the cities of Nagasaki and Uki, Kumamoto, with a total length of 84.4 km (52.44 mi).

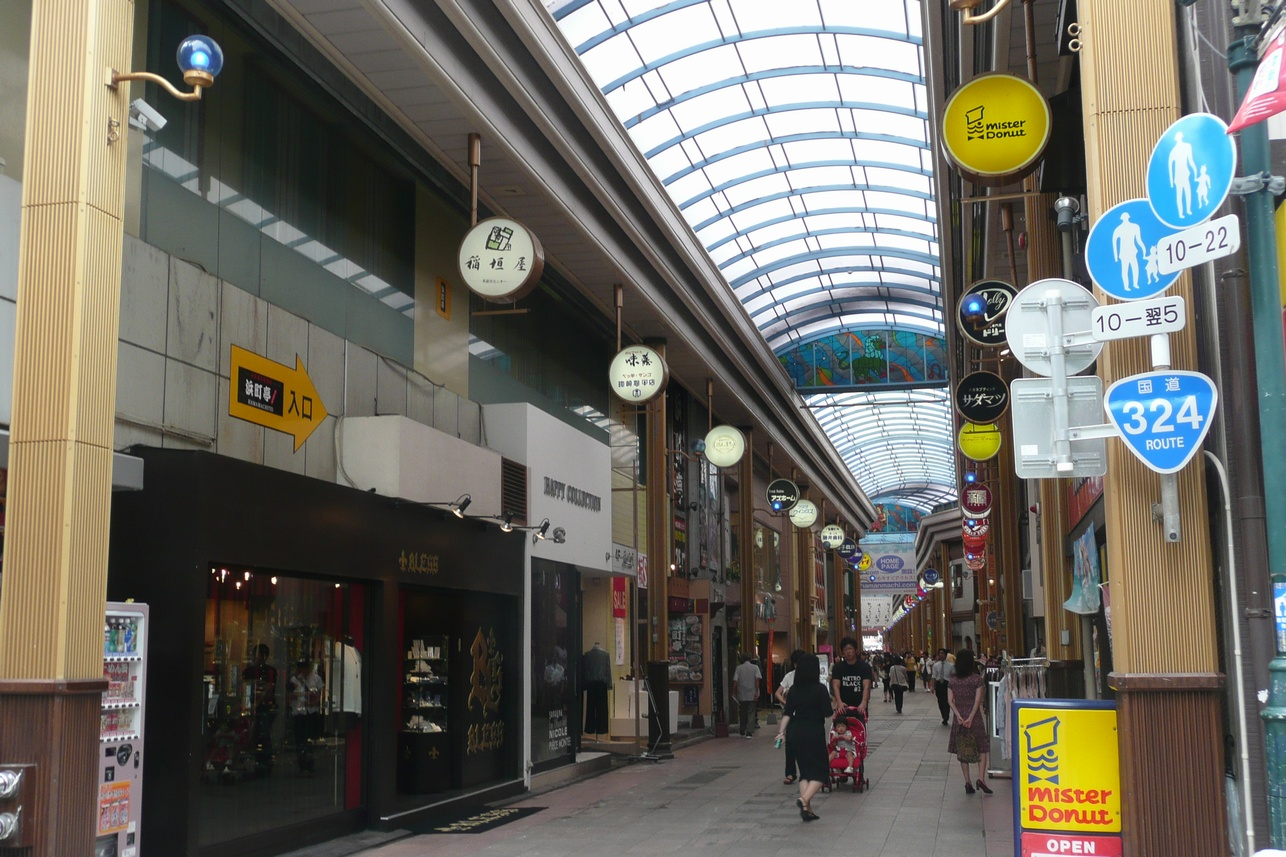
Hamanomachi East side, Nagasaki City
