= Amakusa =

Group of islands

Coordinates: 32°24′N 130°07′E

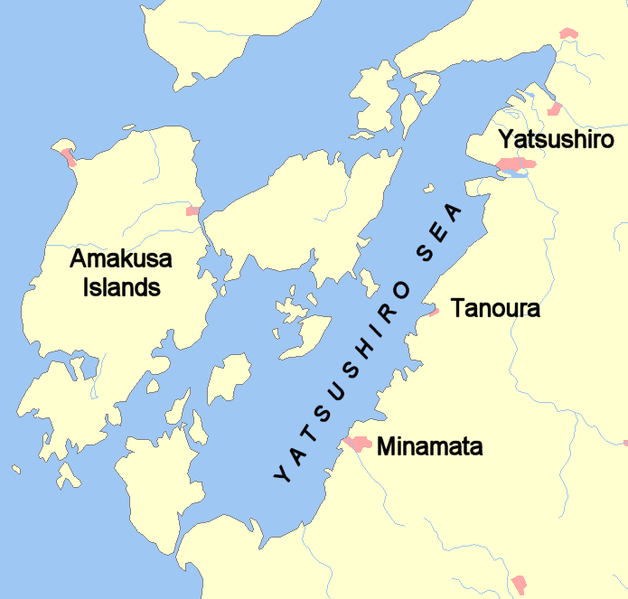
Amakusa islands at Yatsushiro Sea, in Japan. The largest island (left) is Shimoshima.

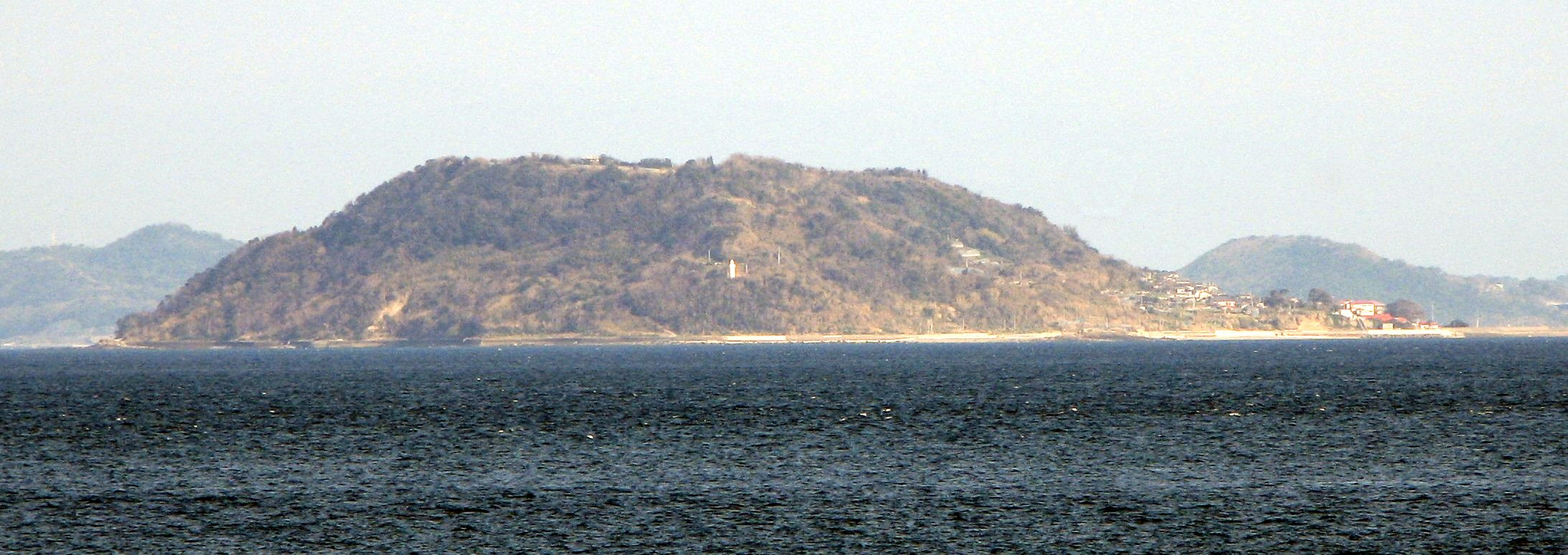
View of Amakusa islands (with Yushima, Kami-Amakusa in foreground).

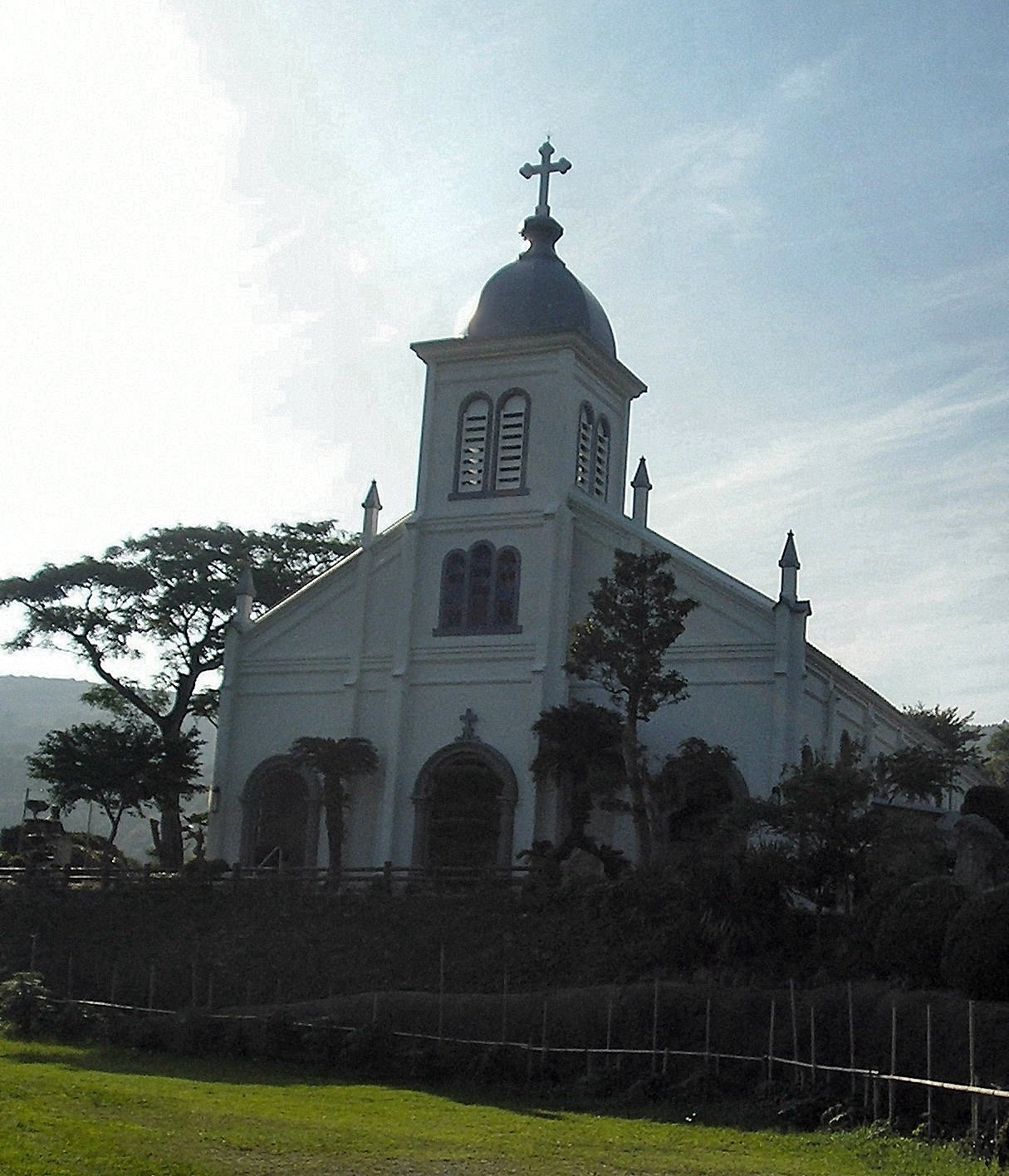
Ōe Catholic Church

Amakusa (天草; Japanese pronunciation: [ä̀.mä́.kɯ̥̈.sä̀, -sä́]) is a series of islands off the west coast of Kyushu, the southernmost of the four main islands of Japan.

== Geography ==
The largest island of the Amakusa group is Shimoshima, which is 26.5 miles long and 13.5 miles at its widest (42.6 km × 21.7 km). It is situated at 32°20'N, 130°E, separated from the rest of Kumamoto Prefecture by the Yatsushiro Sea.

While lacking high mountains with only four peaks surpassing 1,500 feet (460 m), the island terrain is ruggedly hilly. To cope with the lack of flat arable land, farming is carried out on a terrace system of cultivation.

== History ==
Amakusa, along with the neighboring Shimabara Peninsula, became the site of the Shimabara rebellion in the 17th century, led by Christians. Following the rebellion, Kakure Kirishitan, the Christians who had survived, continued to practice their faith in secret, despite severe persecution.

== Economy ==
Amakusa produces a little coal and pottery stone, both being used by the potters of Hirado ware and Satsuma ware. Many kilns remain on the islands today, and pottery and pottery stone are still exported.

Amakusa pottery has been recognised by the government. The retail company Muji brought out its own line of Hakuji home ware, which is produced out of ground translucent Amakusa stones kneaded into clay, using traditional techniques.

== People ==
Hidenoshin Koyama, who built Thomas Blake Glover's House in Glover Garden, came from this island.

Kenta and Ko-shin, two of the three members of Wanima come from the island of Amakusa.

== Government ==
At present, the islands are organized as Amakusa District, Amakusa City, and Kami-amakusa City, all of which are under the administration of Kumamoto Prefecture.

== Transport ==
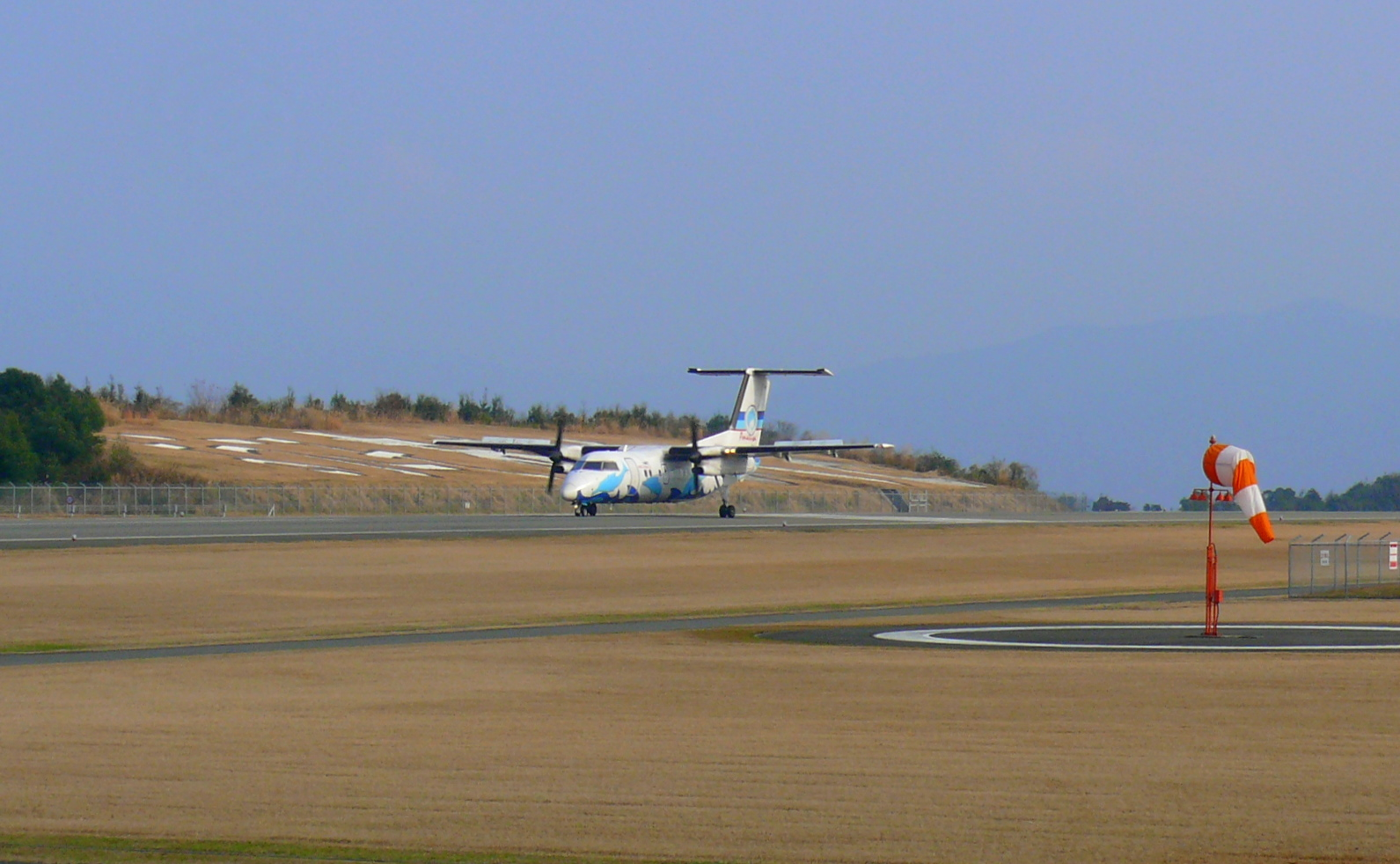
Amakusa Airfield, with DHC-8 plane on runway.

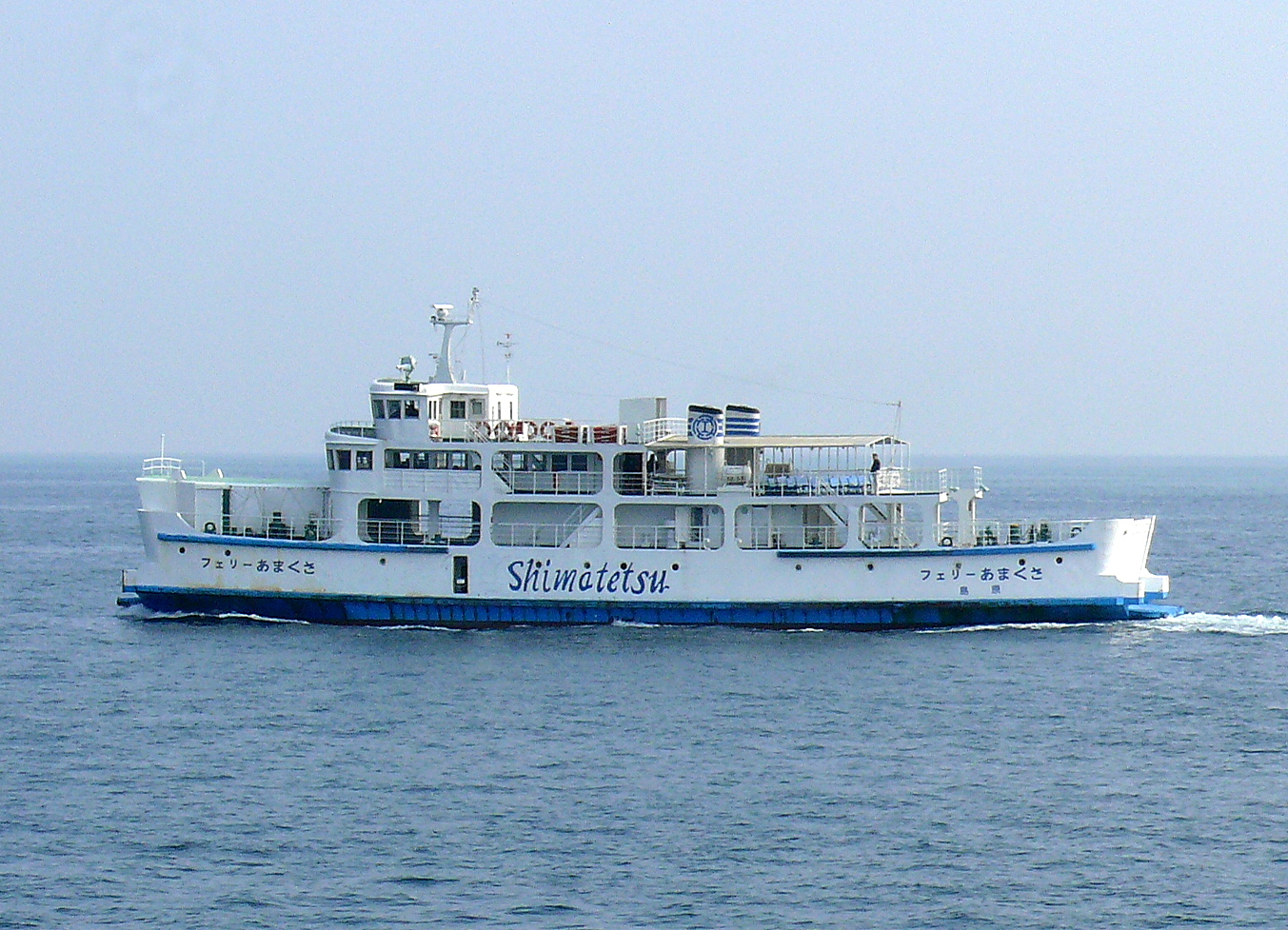
A Shimatetsu Ferry boat, transporting passengers between islands.

The islands are served by Amakusa Airfield, located on the north end of Shimoshima. The islands are connected to the mainland by the Five Bridges of Amakusa and by ferry from Hondo and Matsushima.

There are also ferries between the islands and the neighboring prefectures of Kagoshima Prefecture and Nagasaki Prefecture. The ferry from Oniike on the north Shimoshima to Kuchinotsu, at the southern tip of the Shimabara Peninsula, is run by the Shimabara Railway and operates hourly each day. The ferry boat from Tomioka Port in Reihoku, sailing north to Mogi in Nagasaki Prefecture, is operated by Yasuda Sangyo Kisen Co. Ltd. Two ferries from Shinwa and Ushibuka, in the south of Shimoshima, connect Amakusa to Nagashima in Kagoshima Prefecture.

== Sources ==
- Rowthorn, Chris; Justin Ellis; Ray Bartlett (2005). Japan. Lonely Planet. ISBN 1-74059-924-1.
