= Amakusa, Kumamoto =

Amakusa 天草市
- City
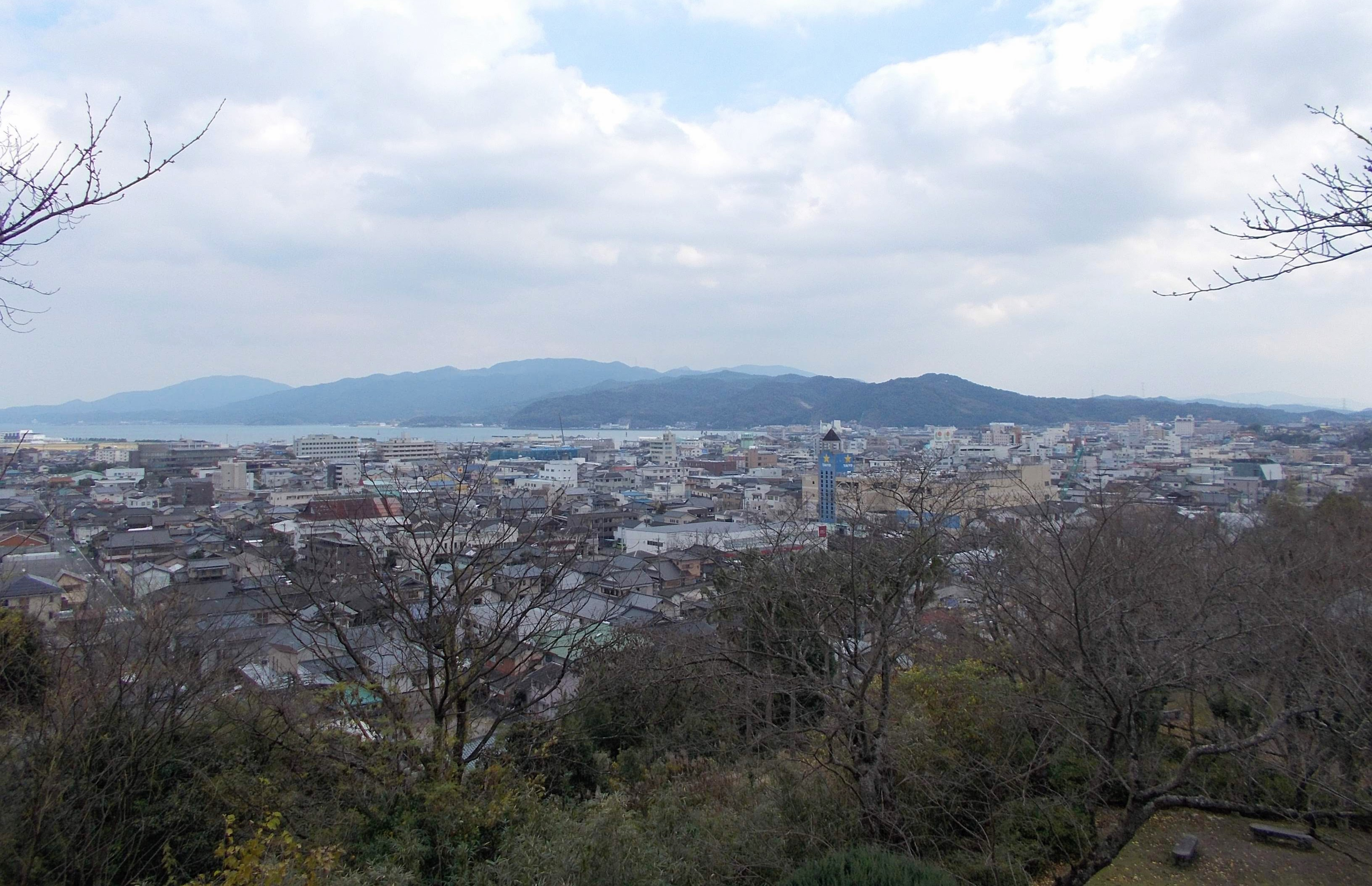
- Panorama view of Amakusa, from Jyunkyō Park

- Flag Emblem
- Interactive map of Amakusa
- Location in Kumamoto Prefecture Location in Kyushu Location in Japan
- Coordinates: 32°27′31″N 130°11′35″E
- Country: Japan
- Region: Kyushu
- Prefecture: Kumamoto

Government
  - Mayor: Shoji Baba

Area
  - Total: 683.82 km^{2} (264.02 sq mi)

Population (August 31, 2024)
  - Total: 72,243
  - Density: 105.65/km^{2} (273.62/sq mi)
- Time zone: UTC+09:00 (JST)
- City hall address: 8-1 Higashihamamachi, Amakusa-shi, Kumamoto-ken 863-0014
- Climate: Cfa
- Website: Official website
- Symbols
- Bird: Larus canus
- Flower: Hibiscus hamabo
- Tree: Ficus superba

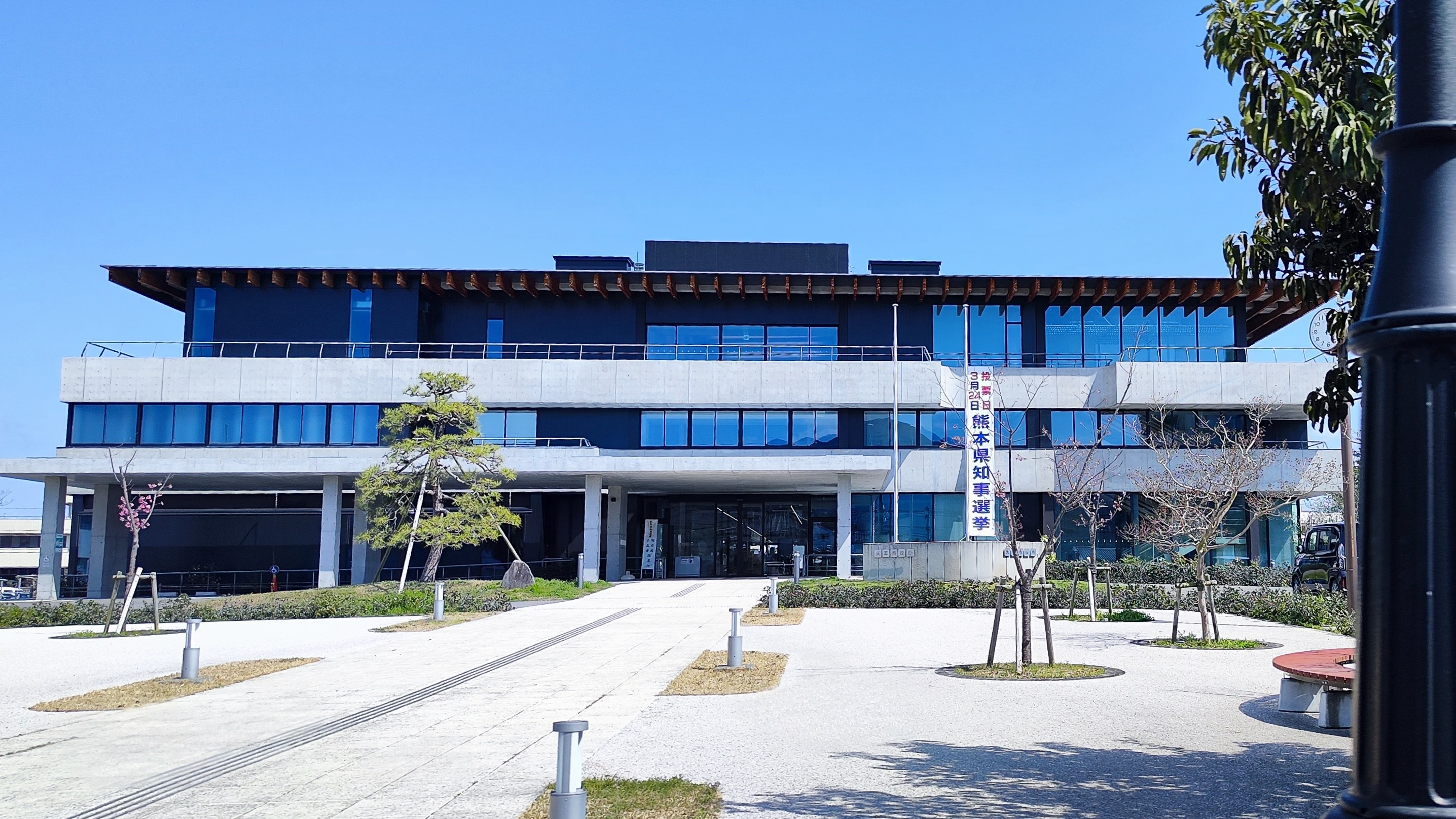
Amakusa City-hall

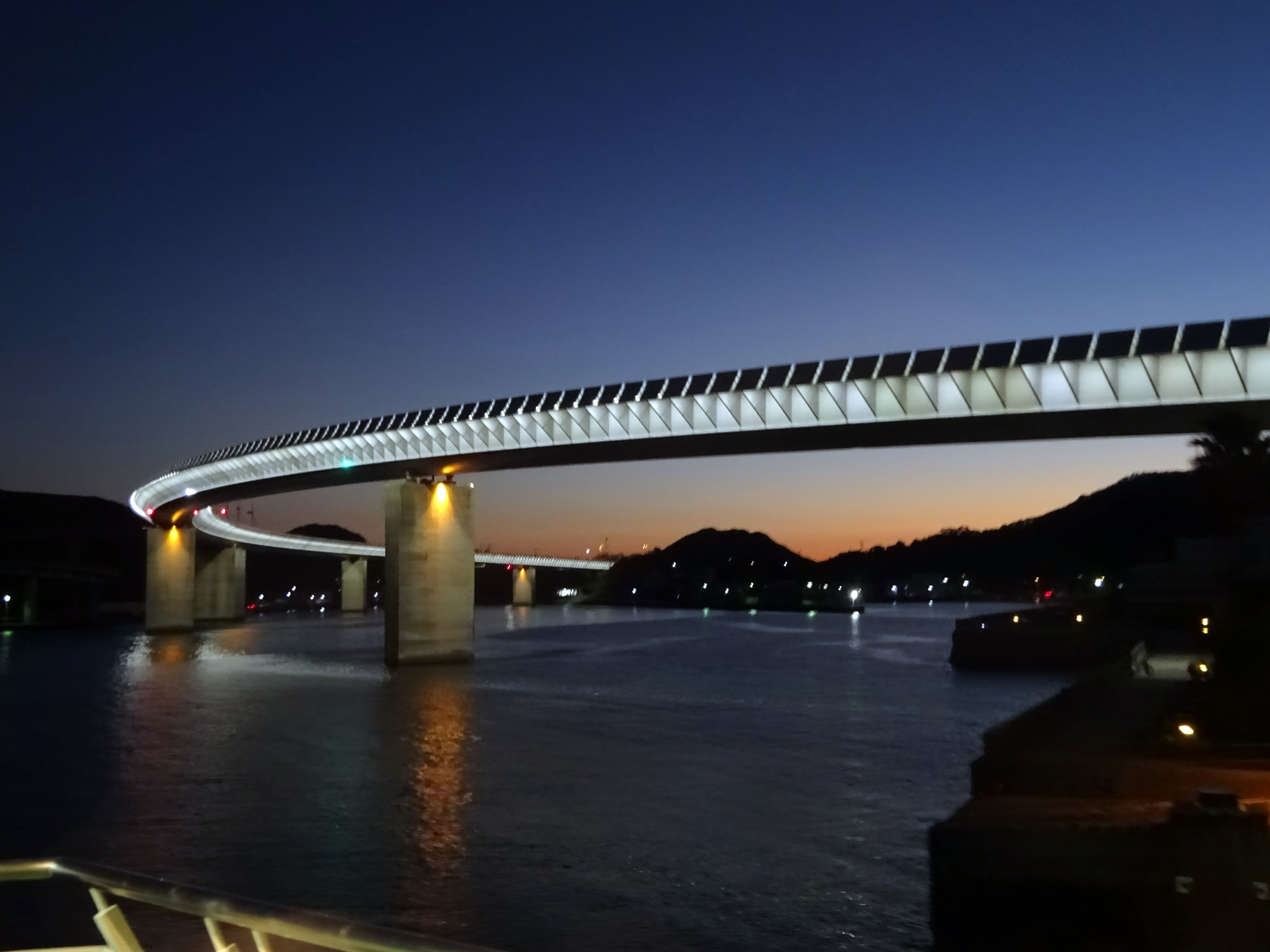
A night view of Ushibuka Haiya Bridge

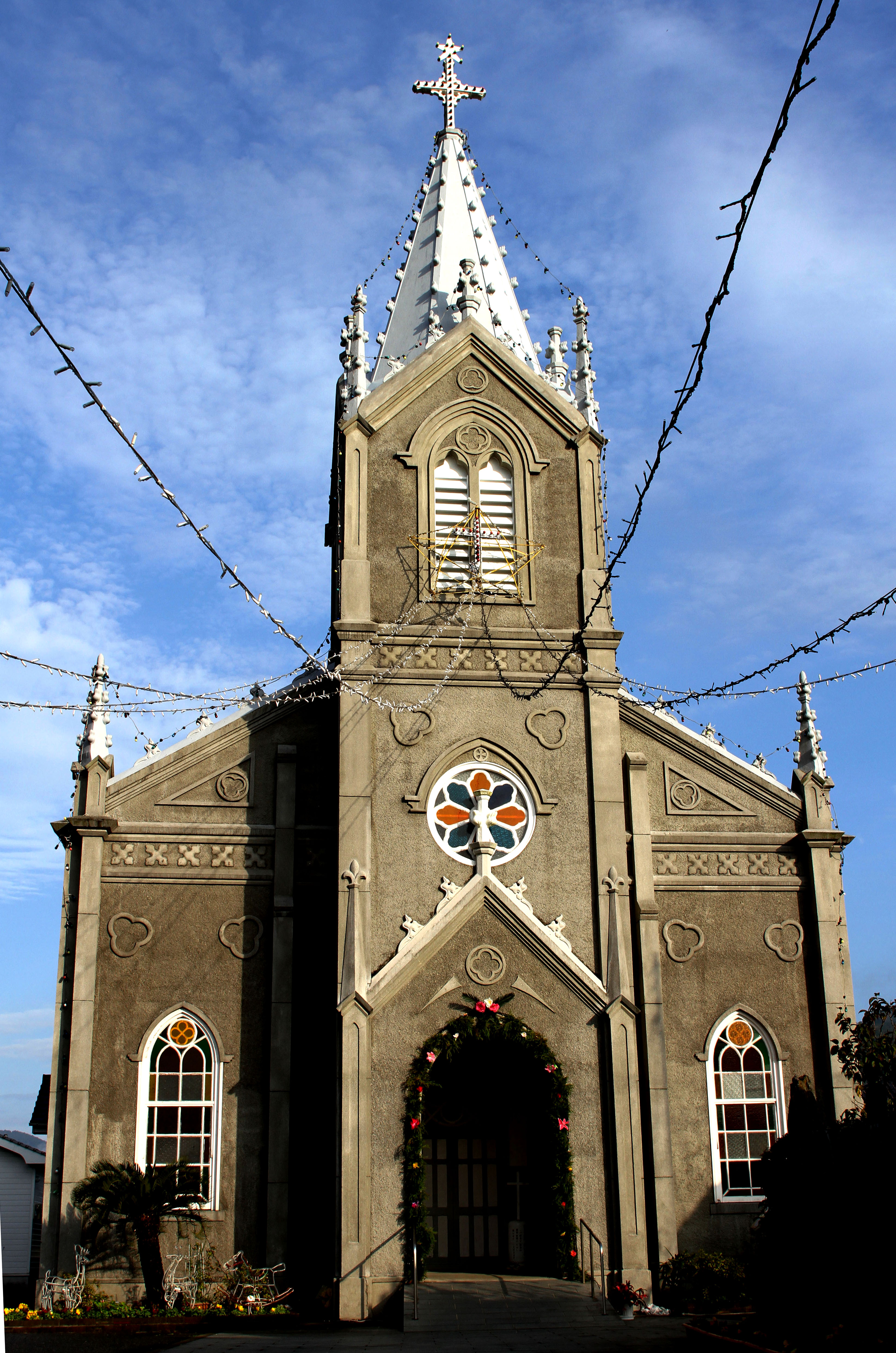
Sakitsu Catholic Church

Amakusa (天草市, Amakusa-shi; Japanese pronunciation: [ä̀.mä́.kɯ̥̈.sä̀, -sä́(.ɕì)]) is a city located in Kumamoto Prefecture, Japan. As of 31 August 2024, the city had an estimated population of 72,243 in 36029 households, and a population density of 110 persons per km^{2}. The total area of the city is 683.82 km^{2} (264.02 sq mi).

== Geography ==
Amakusa covers the majority of two main islands, Kamishima (上島, "Upper Island") and Shimoshima (下島, "Lower Island") (天草諸島), and six smaller inhabited islands and numerous uninhabited islets located the central-west Kumamoto Prefecture, in between the Yatsushiro Sea and the East China Sea. Large parts of the city are within the borders of the Unzen-Amakusa National Park.

=== Neighboring municipalities ===
Kumamoto Prefecture

- Kamiamakusa
- Reihoku

=== Climate ===
Amakusa has a humid subtropical climate (Köppen climate classification Cfa) with hot summers and cool winters. Precipitation is significant throughout the year, and is heaviest from May to August. The average annual temperature in Amakusa is 18.2 °C (64.8 °F). The average annual rainfall is 2,109.8 mm (83.06 in) with June as the wettest month. The temperatures are highest on average in August, at around 28.3 °C (82.9 °F), and lowest in January, at around 8.6 °C (47.5 °F). The highest temperature ever recorded in Amakusa was 39.6 °C (103.3 °F) on 20 August 2013; the coldest temperature ever recorded was −7.0 °C (19.4 °F) on 25 January 2016.

Climate data for Ushibuka, Amakusa (1991−2020 normals, extremes 1949−present)
Month	Jan	Feb	Mar	Apr	May	Jun	Jul	Aug	Sep	Oct	Nov	Dec	Year
Record high °C (°F)	21.8 (71.2)	23.6 (74.5)	24.6 (76.3)	29.2 (84.6)	32.3 (90.1)	33.9 (93.0)	37.5 (99.5)	39.6 (103.3)	37.1 (98.8)	34.0 (93.2)	28.2 (82.8)	24.0 (75.2)	39.6 (103.3)
Mean maximum °C (°F)	17.9 (64.2)	19.1 (66.4)	21.8 (71.2)	25.2 (77.4)	28.6 (83.5)	30.4 (86.7)	34.3 (93.7)	35.8 (96.4)	33.4 (92.1)	29.7 (85.5)	24.6 (76.3)	20.0 (68.0)	36.5 (97.7)
Mean daily maximum °C (°F)	11.8 (53.2)	13.0 (55.4)	16.1 (61.0)	20.3 (68.5)	24.2 (75.6)	26.5 (79.7)	30.4 (86.7)	32.2 (90.0)	29.6 (85.3)	25.0 (77.0)	19.6 (67.3)	14.2 (57.6)	21.9 (71.4)
Daily mean °C (°F)	8.6 (47.5)	9.4 (48.9)	12.2 (54.0)	16.3 (61.3)	20.1 (68.2)	23.1 (73.6)	27.0 (80.6)	28.3 (82.9)	25.6 (78.1)	21.1 (70.0)	16.0 (60.8)	10.8 (51.4)	18.2 (64.8)
Mean daily minimum °C (°F)	5.5 (41.9)	6.0 (42.8)	8.6 (47.5)	12.6 (54.7)	16.6 (61.9)	20.5 (68.9)	24.3 (75.7)	25.4 (77.7)	22.7 (72.9)	17.8 (64.0)	12.8 (55.0)	7.6 (45.7)	15.0 (59.1)
Mean minimum °C (°F)	0.7 (33.3)	1.0 (33.8)	3.3 (37.9)	7.2 (45.0)	12.5 (54.5)	16.8 (62.2)	21.2 (70.2)	22.7 (72.9)	18.4 (65.1)	12.6 (54.7)	5.3 (41.5)	2.1 (35.8)	−0.2 (31.6)
Record low °C (°F)	−3.4 (25.9)	−3.4 (25.9)	−1.6 (29.1)	2.0 (35.6)	9.4 (48.9)	12.6 (54.7)	18.0 (64.4)	18.8 (65.8)	14.1 (57.4)	7.4 (45.3)	2.8 (37.0)	−1.5 (29.3)	−3.4 (25.9)
Average precipitation mm (inches)	79.7 (3.14)	95.4 (3.76)	124.7 (4.91)	158.1 (6.22)	178.7 (7.04)	409.6 (16.13)	348.9 (13.74)	200.7 (7.90)	204.0 (8.03)	96.5 (3.80)	106.5 (4.19)	96.4 (3.80)	2,109.8 (83.06)
Average snowfall cm (inches)	1 (0.4)	1 (0.4)	0 (0)	0 (0)	0 (0)	0 (0)	0 (0)	0 (0)	0 (0)	0 (0)	0 (0)	0 (0)	1 (0.4)
Average precipitation days (≥ 1.0 mm)	10.6	9.6	11.1	10.0	9.5	14.3	10.4	9.5	9.5	6.5	8.6	10.0	119.6
Average snowy days (≥ 1 cm)	0.3	0.4	0	0	0	0	0	0	0	0	0	0	0.7
Average relative humidity (%)	65	64	66	69	73	82	82	77	73	66	67	65	71
Mean monthly sunshine hours	105.4	121.7	160.9	180.9	189.7	124.1	193.1	227.9	192.0	191.0	147.2	118.4	1,954.5
Source: Japan Meteorological Agency

Climate data for Hondo, Amakusa (1991−2020 normals, extremes 1977−present)
Month	Jan	Feb	Mar	Apr	May	Jun	Jul	Aug	Sep	Oct	Nov	Dec	Year
Record high °C (°F)	22.0 (71.6)	23.2 (73.8)	26.5 (79.7)	29.5 (85.1)	32.9 (91.2)	35.2 (95.4)	37.9 (100.2)	38.8 (101.8)	36.5 (97.7)	33.3 (91.9)	27.9 (82.2)	25.1 (77.2)	38.8 (101.8)
Mean daily maximum °C (°F)	10.7 (51.3)	12.2 (54.0)	15.5 (59.9)	20.7 (69.3)	25.2 (77.4)	27.3 (81.1)	31.3 (88.3)	32.5 (90.5)	29.1 (84.4)	24.0 (75.2)	18.4 (65.1)	12.9 (55.2)	21.7 (71.0)
Daily mean °C (°F)	6.2 (43.2)	7.2 (45.0)	10.3 (50.5)	14.9 (58.8)	19.2 (66.6)	22.6 (72.7)	26.5 (79.7)	27.3 (81.1)	24.0 (75.2)	18.9 (66.0)	13.4 (56.1)	8.3 (46.9)	16.6 (61.8)
Mean daily minimum °C (°F)	2.1 (35.8)	2.6 (36.7)	5.3 (41.5)	9.5 (49.1)	14.0 (57.2)	18.8 (65.8)	22.9 (73.2)	23.4 (74.1)	20.2 (68.4)	14.6 (58.3)	9.1 (48.4)	4.1 (39.4)	12.2 (54.0)
Record low °C (°F)	−7.0 (19.4)	−5.6 (21.9)	−3.1 (26.4)	0.4 (32.7)	6.4 (43.5)	10.9 (51.6)	16.6 (61.9)	17.5 (63.5)	11.7 (53.1)	3.4 (38.1)	−0.2 (31.6)	−3.2 (26.2)	−7.0 (19.4)
Average precipitation mm (inches)	83.1 (3.27)	96.1 (3.78)	132.6 (5.22)	157.2 (6.19)	169.9 (6.69)	405.3 (15.96)	340.5 (13.41)	215.0 (8.46)	195.4 (7.69)	111.9 (4.41)	108.4 (4.27)	91.6 (3.61)	2,106.3 (82.93)
Average precipitation days (≥ 1.0 mm)	9.9	9.8	10.8	10.2	9.5	15.1	12.3	10.5	10.1	7.1	9.1	9.9	124.3
Mean monthly sunshine hours	108.8	126.6	163.1	183.7	190.7	119.2	178.2	216.0	179.8	184.3	142.4	120.9	1,915.7
Source: Japan Meteorological Agency

=== Demographics ===
Per Japanese census data, the population of Amakusa in 2020 is 75,783 people. Amakusa has been conducting censuses since 1920. Amakusa has the distinction of being the fastest depopulating city in Japan since the last census (2005).

Historical population

Year	Pop.	±%
1920	122,297	—
1925	121,482	−0.7%
1930	125,165	+3.0%
1935	123,495	−1.3%
1940	123,580	+0.1%
1945	167,936	+35.9%
1950	169,508	+0.9%
1955	169,880	+0.2%
1960	158,882	−6.5%
1965	142,346	−10.4%
1970	127,636	−10.3%

Year	Pop.	±%
1975	122,513	−4.0%
1980	121,574	−0.8%
1985	118,765	−2.3%
1990	112,068	−5.6%
1995	107,823	−3.8%
2000	102,907	−4.6%
2005	96,473	−6.3%
2010	89,091	−7.7%
2015	82,739	−7.1%
2020	75,783	−8.4%

Amakusa population statistics

== History ==
The area of Amakusa was part of ancient Higo Province, During the Edo Period it was tenryō territory under direct control of the Tokugawa shogunate and administered from the office of the Nagasaki bugyō. After the Meiji restoration, the villages of Takahama, Fukurengi, Shimoda and Oe were established in Amakusa District, Kumamoto with the creation of the modern municipalities system on April 1, 1889. On September 21, 1956, these villages merged to form the town of Amakusa. The city of Amakusa was established on March 27, 2006, from a merger between the former cities of Hondo and Ushibuka, and the towns of Amakusa, Ariake, Goshoura, Itsuwa, Kawaura, Kuratake, Shinwa and Sumoto from Amakusa District.

== Government ==
Amakusa has a mayor-council form of government with a directly elected mayor and a unicameral city council of 26 members. Amakusa, together with the town of Reihoku contributes three members to the Kumamoto Prefectural Assembly. In terms of national politics, the city is part of the Kumamoto 4th district of the lower house of the Diet of Japan.

== Economy ==
Amakusa has a rural economy dominated by agriculture and commercial fishing. Tourism also plays a major role.

Amakusa Airlines is headquartered in Amakusa.

== Education ==
Amakusa has 17 public elementary schools and 13 public junior high schools operated by the city government and four public high school operated by the Kumamoto Prefectural Board of Education. There is also one private high school. The prefecture also operates one school for the handicapped.

== Transportation ==
=== Airports ===
- Amakusa Airfield

=== Railways ===
Amakusa has no passenger railway service. The nearest train station is Misumi Station on the JR Kyushu Misumi Line in Uki City.

=== Highways ===
- National Route 266
- National Route 324
- National Route 389

== Sister city relations ==
- Encinitas, California, United States

== Local attractions ==
=== Sightseeing ===
- Alegria Gardens
- Amakusa Christian Museum
- Amakusa Dolphin Marine Land
- Ōe Catholic Church
- Sakitsu Church
- Shimoda Onsen hot springs
- Tanasoko Castle ruins, National Historic Site
- Unzen-Amakusa National Park
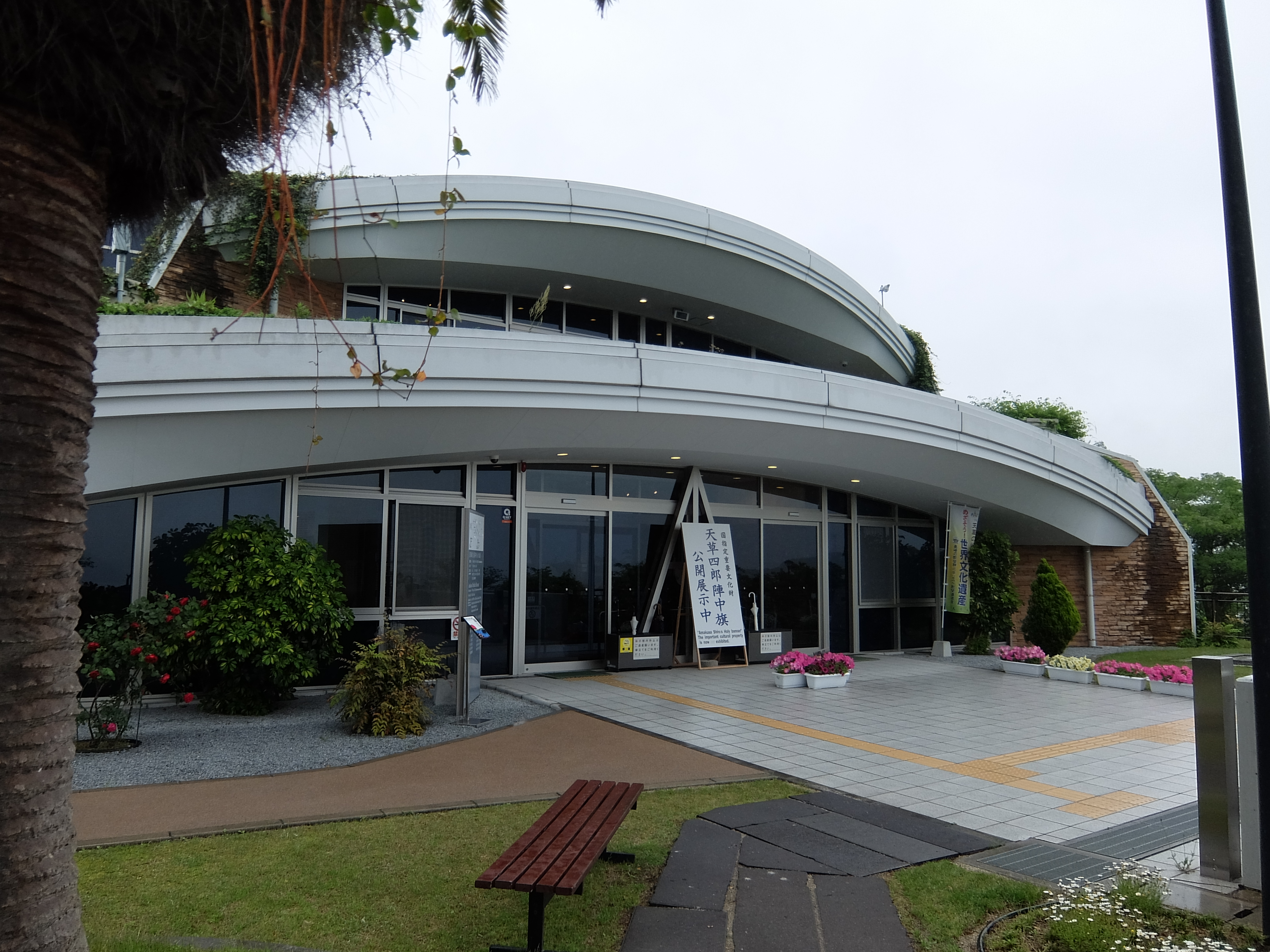
Amakusa Christian Museum

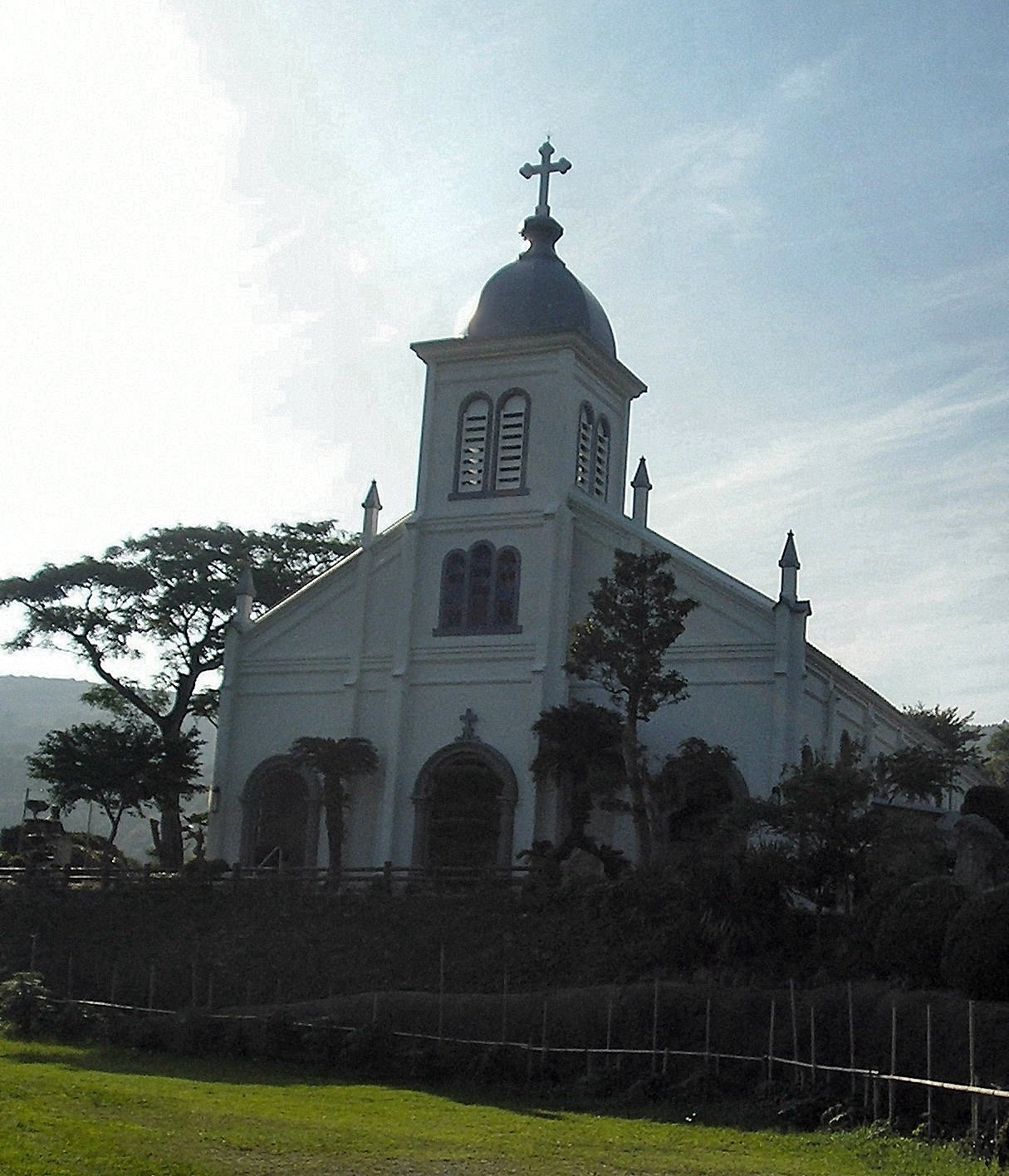
Ōe Catholic Church

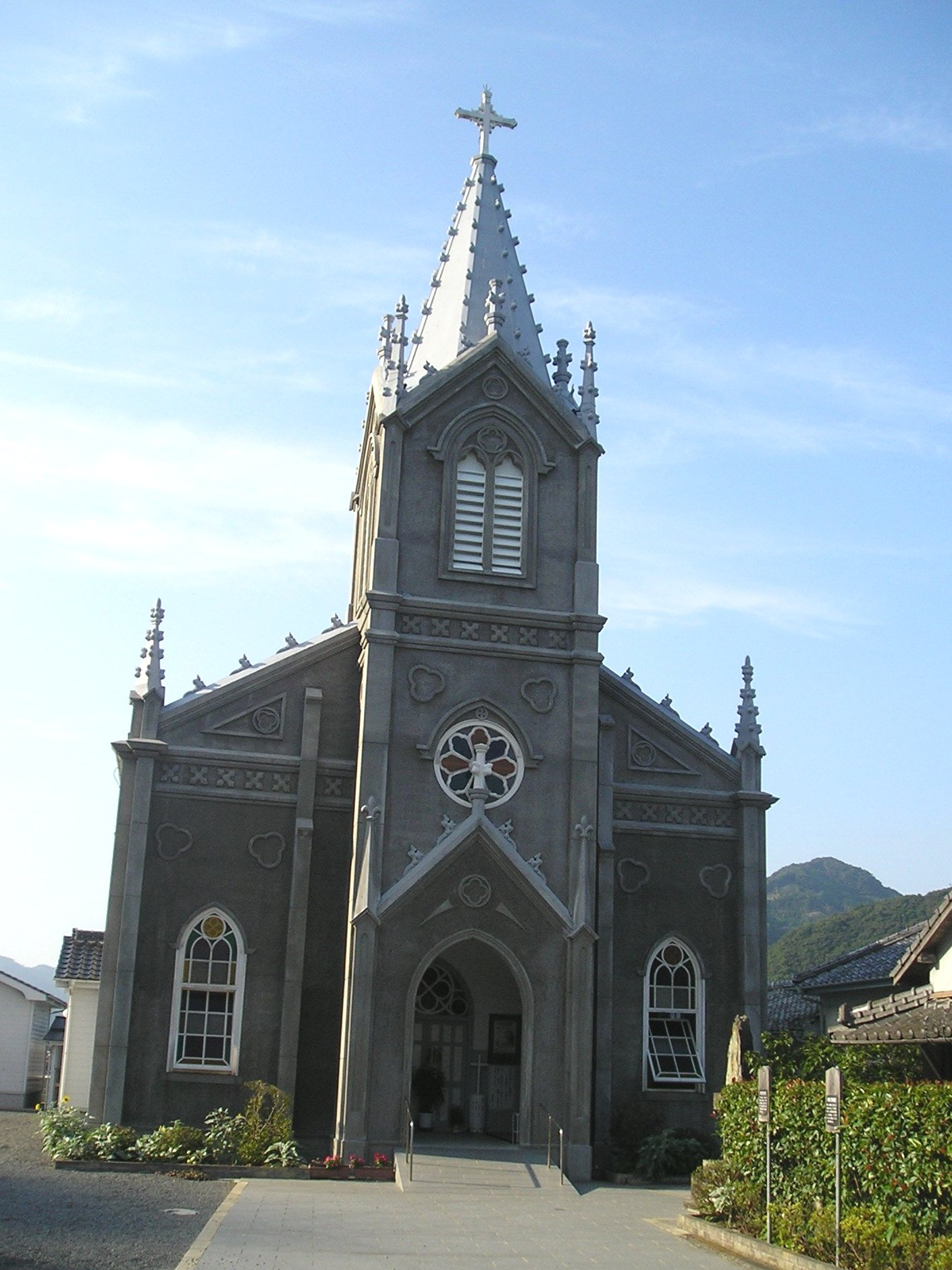
Sakitsu Catholic Church

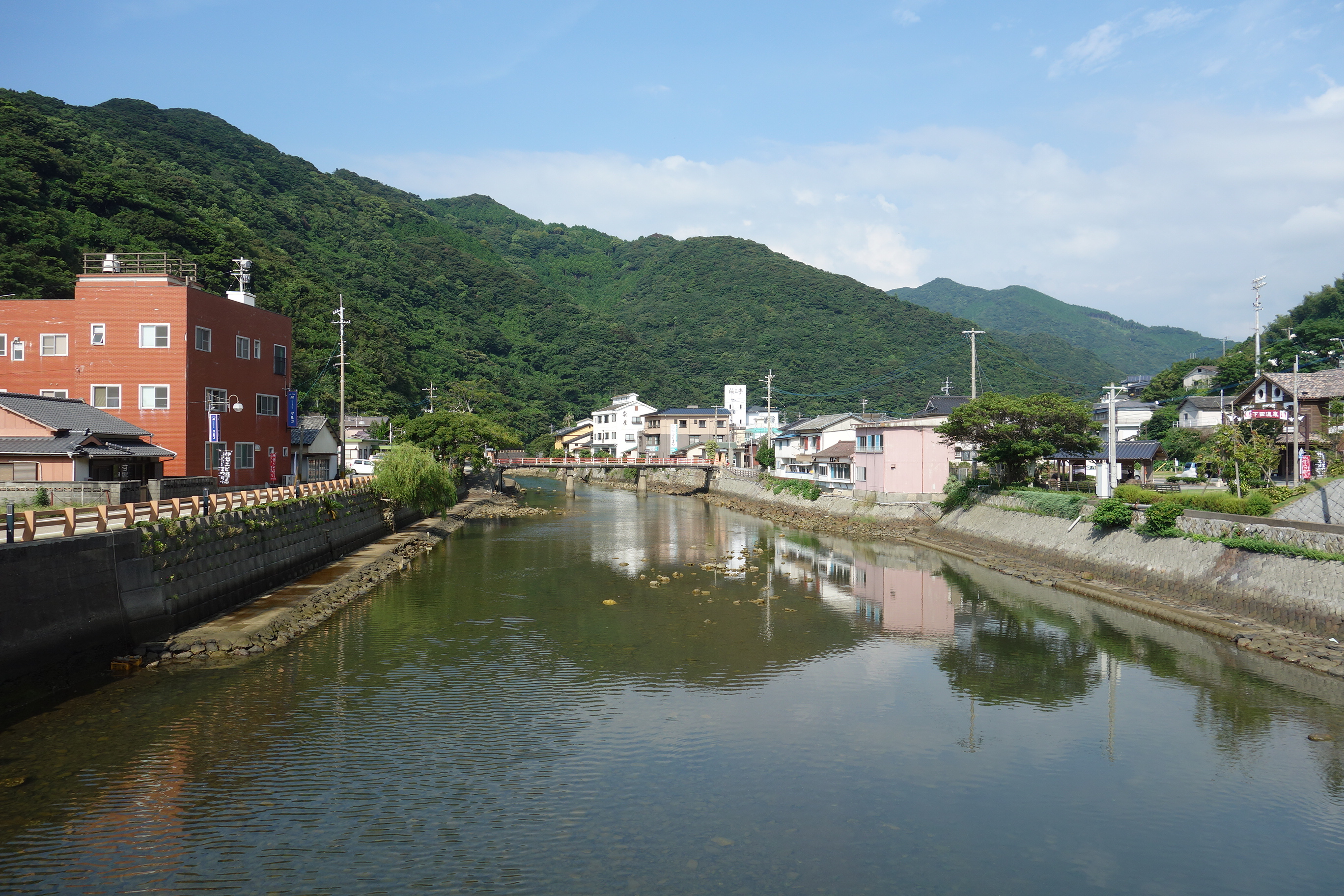
Shimoda Onsen hot springs

== Notable people ==
- Michiko Ishimure, writer
- Kundō Koyama, film writer
- Tochihikari Masayuki, sumo wrestler
- Hiroyuki Sonoda, statesman
- Sunao Sonoda, statesman
- Yoshiki Tanaka, novelist
