= Itsuwa =

Itsuwa may refer to:

- Itsuwa, Kumamoto, a former town in Amakusa District, Kumamoto Prefecture, Japan
- Itsuwa (A Certain Magical Index), a character in the light novel series A Certain Magical Index

== People with the surname ==
- Mayumi Itsuwa (五輪 真弓, born 1951), Japanese singer-songwriter
