= Amakusa District, Kumamoto =

District in Kumamoto Prefecture, Japan

Coordinates: 32°30′29″N 130°02′51″E

Location of Amakusa District in Kumamoto Prefecture

Amakusa (天草郡, Amakusa-gun) is a district located in Kumamoto Prefecture, Japan.

Following the March 27, 2006 Amakusa merger the district consists of the single town of Reihoku. After the merger, the district has an estimated population of 9,105 and a density of 135.77 persons per km^{2}. The total area is 67.06 km^{2}.

== Towns and villages ==
- Reihoku

== Mergers ==
- On March 31, 2004 the towns of Himedo, Matsushima, Ōyano and Ryūgatake merged to form the new city of Kami-Amakusa.
- On March 27, 2006 the towns of Amakusa, Ariake, Goshoura, Itsuwa, Kawaura, Kuratake, Shinwa and Sumoto merged with the cities of Hondo and Ushibuka to form the new city of Amakusa.

== Transport ==
Ferry from Itsuwa Oniike on the north of the Amakusa Peninsular to Kuchinotsu at the southern tip of the Shimabara Peninsula is run by the Shimbara Railway Co. Services operate frequently each day.

  http://www.shimatetsu.co.jp/

Ferry from Tomioka Port in northern Amakusa to Mogi/Motegi in Nagasaki Prefecture is operated by Yasuda Sangyo Kisen Co.Ltd https://web.archive.org/web/20110810174645/http://kisen.yasuda-gp.net/kouro02/index.html
