= Michiko Ishimure =

Japanese writer and activist (1927–2018)

- 石牟礼道子
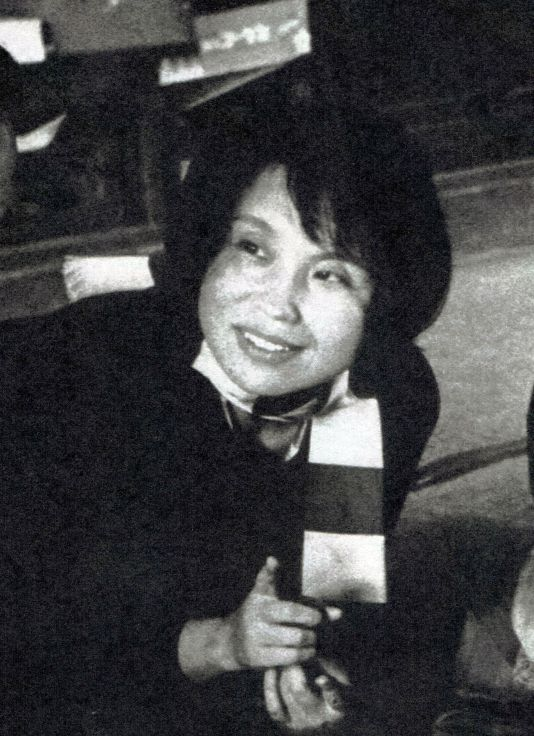
- Born: 11 March 1927; Kawaura, Kumamoto Prefecture, Japan
- Died: 10 February 2018 (aged 90); Kumamoto, Kumamoto Prefecture, Japan
- Known for: writer, activist, environmentalist, writing
- Notable work: Paradise in the Sea of Sorrow: Our Minamata Disease, Story of the Sea of Camellias, Lake of Heaven

Michiko Ishimure (石牟礼道子, Ishimure Michiko; 11 March 1927 – 10 February 2018) was a Japanese writer and activist.

She won the 1973 Ramon Magsaysay Award, among the most prestigious awards in Asia, for publicizing writings about Minamata disease, which was extremely controversial at the time.

== Select works ==
- Paradise in the Sea of Sorrow: Our Minamata Disease (1969) translated into English by Livia Monnet and into German by Ursula Graefe.
- Story of the Sea of Camellias (1976) translated into English by Livia Monnet
- Lake of Heaven (1997) translated into English by Bruce Allen.
- Anima no tori (Birds of Spirit) (1999)
- Shiranui: A Contemporary Noh Drama translated into English by Bruce Allen.
