= Ariake, Kumamoto =

Town in Japan

Ariake (有明町, Ariake-machi) was a town located in Amakusa District, Kumamoto Prefecture, Japan.

As of 2003, the town had an estimated population of 6,109 and a density of 102.43 persons per km^{2}. The total area was 59.64 km^{2}.

On March 27, 2006, Ariake, along with the cities of Hondo and Ushibuka, and the towns of Amakusa, Goshoura, Itsuwa, Kawaura, Kuratake, Shinwa and Sumoto (all from Amakusa District), was merged to create the new city of Amakusa and no longer exists as an independent municipality.
