= Goshoura, Kumamoto =

Dissolved municipality in Kumamoto prefecture, Japan

Goshoura (御所浦町, Goshoura-machi) was a town located in Amakusa District, Kumamoto Prefecture, Japan.

As of 2003, the town had an estimated population of 3,890 and a density of 192.96 persons per km^{2}. The total area was 20.16 km^{2}.

On March 27, 2006, Goshoura, along with the cities of Hondo and Ushibuka, and the towns of Amakusa, Ariake, Itsuwa, Kawaura, Kuratake, Shinwa and Sumoto (all from Amakusa District), was merged to create the new city of Amakusa and no longer exists as an independent municipality.
