= Hondo, Kumamoto =

Dissolved municipality in Kumamoto prefecture, Japan

Coordinates: 32°27′N 130°12′E

Hondo 本渡市 ほんどし
- City
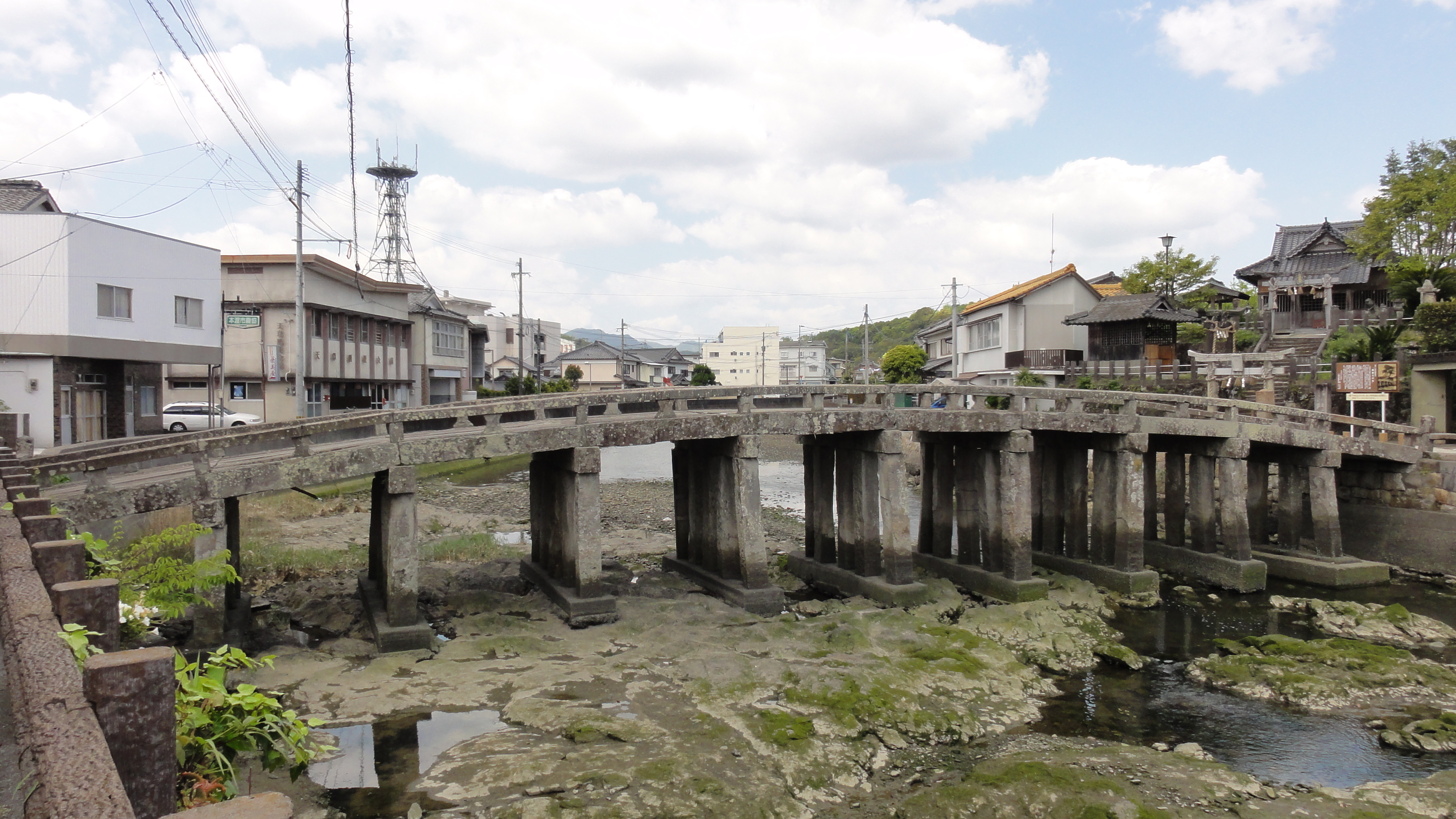
- Gion Bridge

- Flag Seal
- Interactive map of Hondo
- Country: Japan
- Region: Kyushu
- Prefectures of Japan: Kumamoto
- Merged: March 27, 2006

Area
  - Total: 144.81 km^{2} (55.91 sq mi)

Population (2005)
  - Total: 39,944
  - Density: 275.84/km^{2} (714.42/sq mi)

Hondo (本渡市, Hondo-shi) was a city in Kumamoto Prefecture, Japan. The city was founded on April 1, 1954.

As of 2003, the city had an estimated population of 40,838 and the density of 281.99/km^{2} (730.4/sq mi). The total area was 144.82 km^{2} (55.92 sq mi).

On March 27, 2006, Hondo was merged with the city of Ushibuka and the towns of Amakusa, Ariake, Goshoura, Itsuwa, Kawaura, Kuratake, Shinwa and Sumoto (all from Amakusa District) to create the new city of Amakusa and no longer exists as an independent municipality of Japan.
