= Reihoku, Kumamoto =

Reihoku 苓北町
- Town
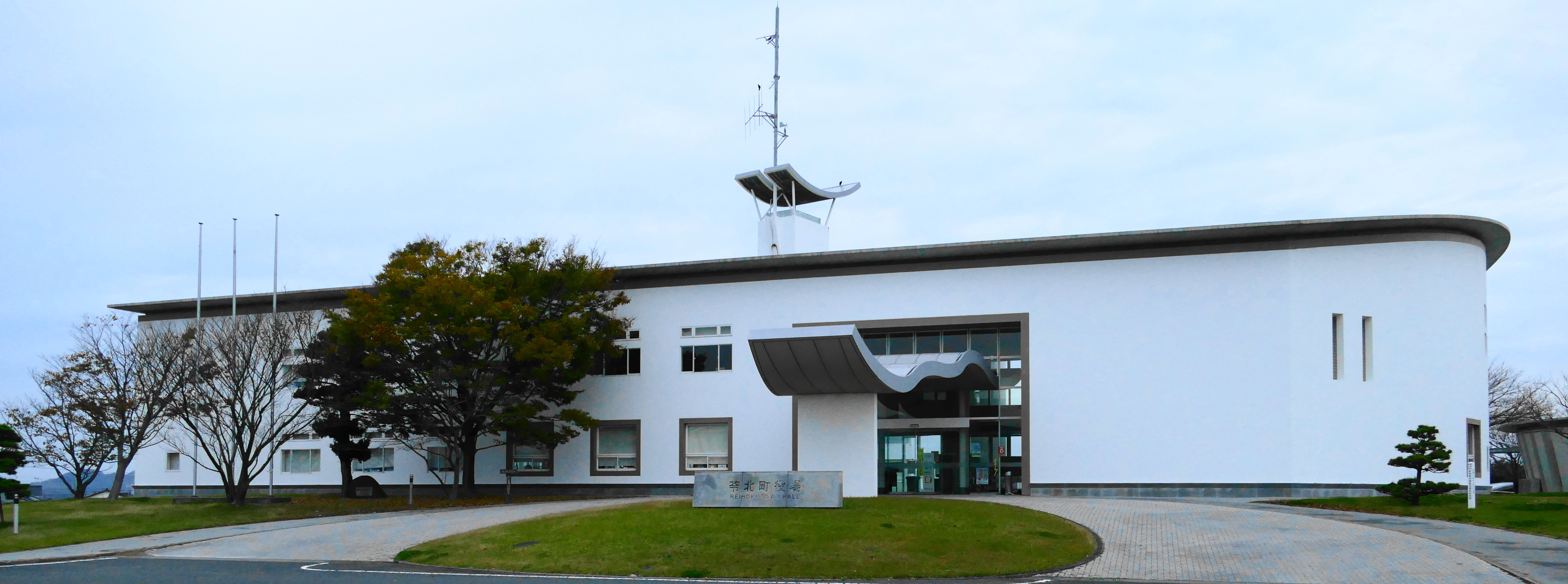
- Reihoku Town Hall

- Flag Chapter

- Location of Reihoku in Kumamoto Prefecture

- Location in Japan
- Coordinates: 32°30′48″N 130°03′17″E
- Country: Japan
- Region: Kyushu
- Prefecture: Kumamoto
- District: Amakusa

Area
  - Total: 67.58 km^{2} (26.09 sq mi)

Population (August 31, 2024)
  - Total: 6,264
  - Density: 92.69/km^{2} (240.1/sq mi)
- Time zone: UTC+09:00 (JST)
- City hall address: 660 Shiki, Reihoku-cho, Amakusa-gun, Kumamoto-ken, 863-2503
- Website: Official website
- Symbols
- Flower: Crinum asiaticum
- Tree: Camellia japonica

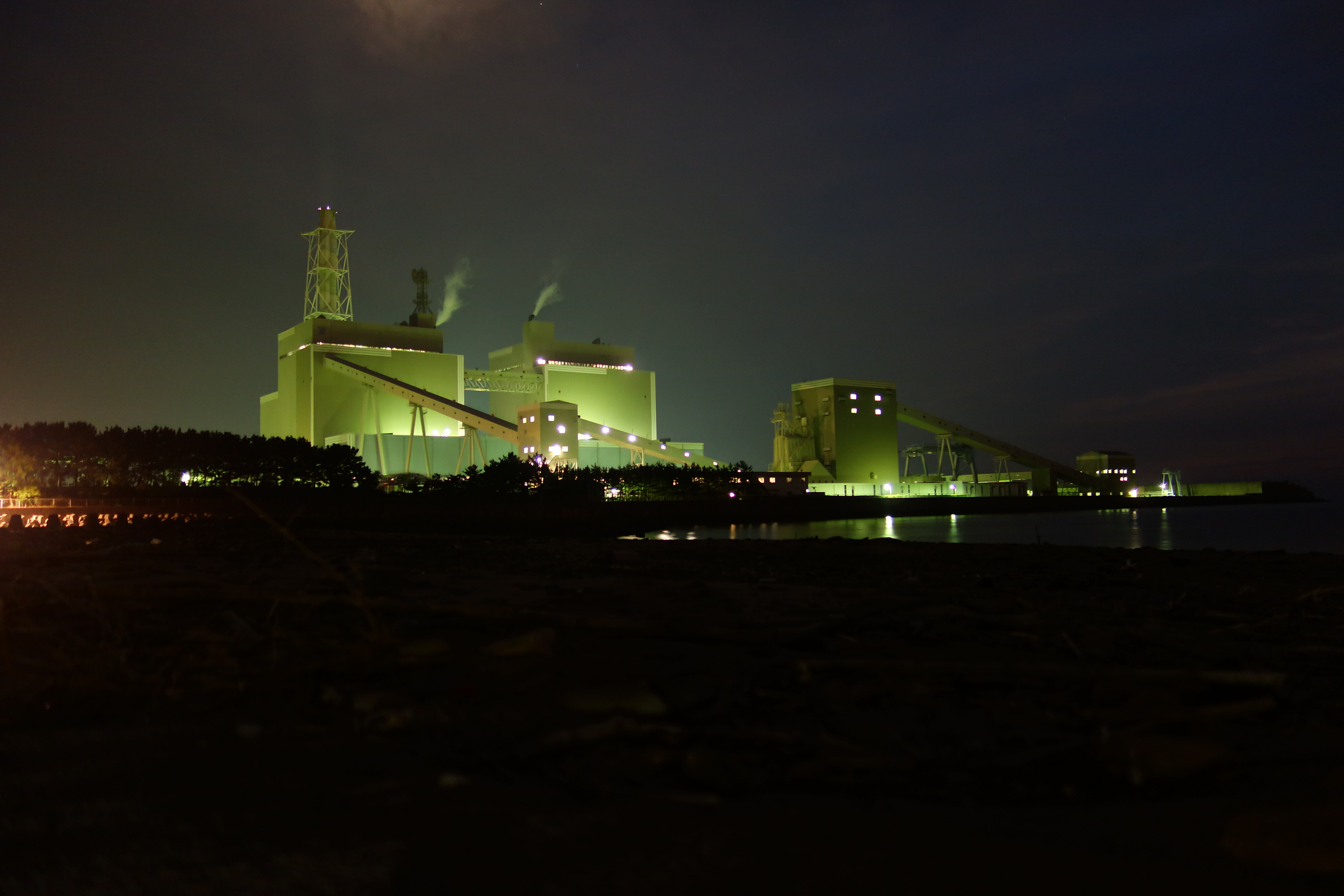
Kyushu Electric Power Reihoku Thermal Power Plant

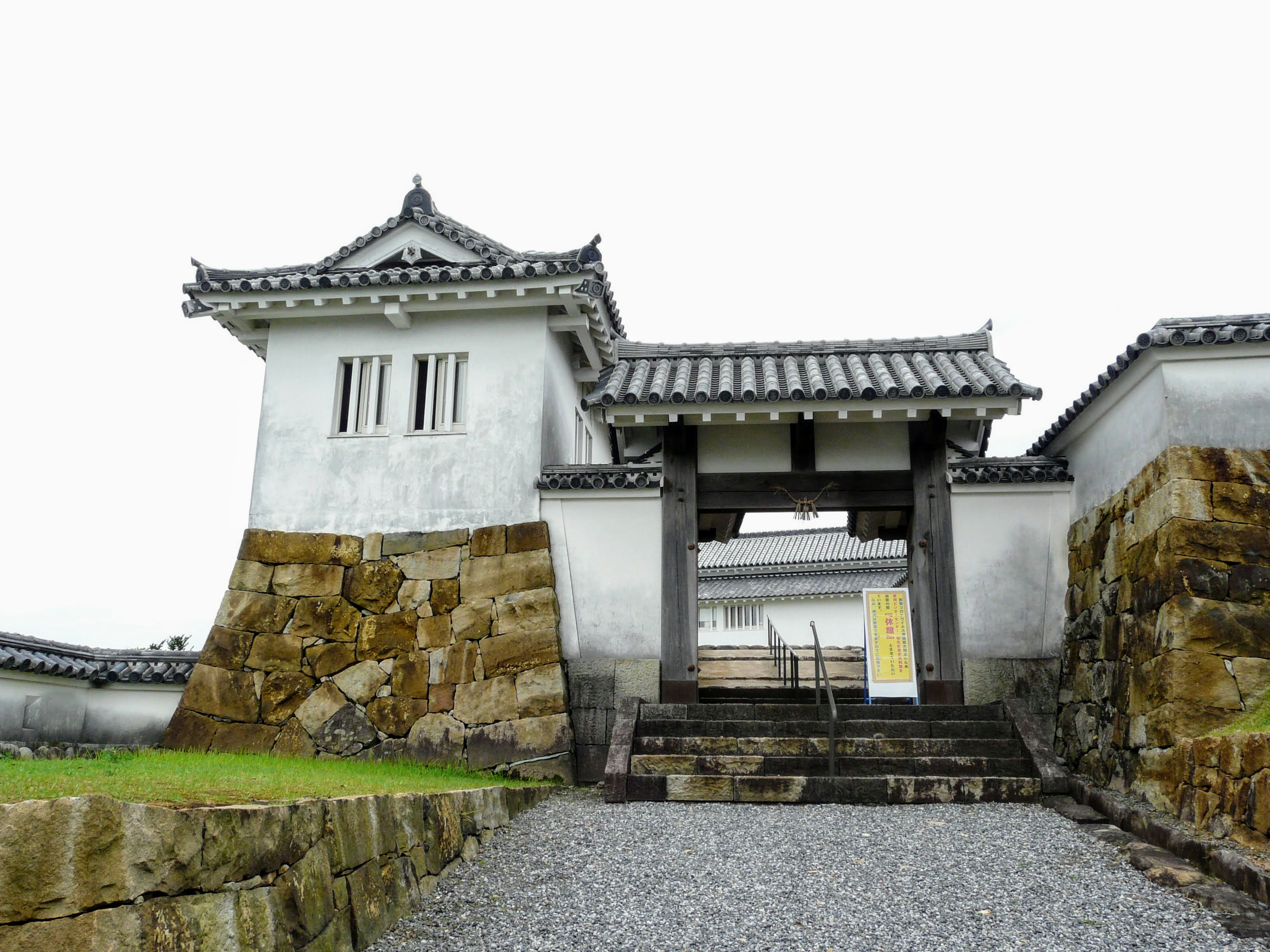
Tomioka Castle

Reihoku (苓北町, Reihoku-machi) is a town located in Amakusa District, Kumamoto Prefecture, Japan. As of 31 August 2024, the town had an estimated population of 6,264 in 3,016 households, and a population density of 93 persons per km^{2}. The total area of the town is 67.58 km^{2} (26.09 sq mi).

== Geography ==
Reihoku is located at the northwestern tip of Shimoshima (下島, "Lower Island"), the largest of the Amakusa Islands. It faces the Amakusa Sea to the west and the Gulf of Chijiwa to the north. Parts of the town are within the borders of the Unzen-Amakusa National Park.

=== Neighboring municipalities ===
Kumamoto Prefecture

- Amakusa

=== Climate ===
Reihoku has a humid subtropical climate (Köppen Cfa) characterized by warm summers and cool winters with light to no snowfall. The average annual temperature in Reihoku is 17.3 °C. The average annual rainfall is 2259 mm with September as the wettest month. The temperatures are highest on average in August, at around 27.2 °C, and lowest in January, at around 7.8 °C.

=== Demographics ===
Per Japanese census data, the population of Reihoku is as shown below

Historical population
Year	Pop.	±%
1940	11,977	—
1950	16,192	+35.2%
1960	16,603	+2.5%
1970	12,445	−25.0%
1980	10,897	−12.4%
1990	9,916	−9.0%
2000	9,436	−4.8%
2010	8,314	−11.9%
2020	7,114	−14.4%

== History ==
The area of Reihoku was part of ancient Higo Province, and contained the stronghold of the Shiki clan, who dominated the area from the Kamakura period to the Sengoku period. During the Edo Period it was tenryō territory under direct control of the Tokugawa shogunate and administered from the office of the Nagasaki bugyō, and it remained the de facto center of the Amakusa region. After the Meiji restoration, the town of Tomioka, and villages of Sakasegawa, Shiki and Tororo were established in Amakusa District, Kumamoto with the creation of the modern municipalities system on April 1, 1889. On January 1, 1955, Tomioka merged with Sakasegawa and Shiki to form the town of Reihoku. The village of Tororo was incorporated into Reihoku on September 30, 1956.

== Government ==
Reihoku has a mayor-council form of government with a directly elected mayor and a unicameral city council of ten members. Reihoku, together with the city of Amakusa contributes three members to the Kumamoto Prefectural Assembly. In terms of national politics, the town is part of the Kumamoto 4th district of the lower house of the Diet of Japan.

== Economy ==
Since the Edo period, Reihoku has been known as a producer of Amakusa kaolinite, a raw material for porcelain, and quarrying remains a major component of the local economy. The town was also known for its coal mining, with some of the mine shafts extending below sea level. On February 20, 1954, an accident occurred at the Shiki coal mine when an excavation error caused seawater to flow into the tunnels, killing 36 people. By the 1960s, most of the mines had closed, but in the 1990s, the Kyushu Electric Power Reihoku Thermal Power Plant, a 1,400-megawatt coal-fired power station was built on the west coast, and its output is enough to cover about two-thirds of the electricity demand in Kumamoto Prefecture. As a result, the town's finances were strong and it was not merged into Amakusa City.

== Education ==
Reihoku has four public elementary schools and one public junior high school operated by the town government and one public high school operated by the Kumamoto Prefectural Board of Education.

== Transportation ==
=== Railways ===
Reihoku has no passenger railway service. The nearest train station is Misumi Station on the JR Kyushu Misumi Line in Uki City.

=== Highways ===
- National Route 324
- National Route 389
