= Kuratake, Kumamoto =

Dissolved municipality in Kumamoto prefecture, Japan

Kuratake (倉岳町, Kuratake-machi) was a town located in Amakusa District, Kumamoto Prefecture, Japan.

As of 2003, the town had an estimated population of 3,587 and a density of 140.17 persons per km^{2}. The total area was 25.59 km^{2}.

On March 27, 2006, Kuratake, along with the cities of Hondo and Ushibuka, and the towns of Amakusa, Ariake, Goshoura, Itsuwa, Kawaura, Shinwa and Sumoto (all from Amakusa District), were merged into the new city of Amakusa and no longer exists as an independent municipality.
