= Tanasoko Castle =

Castle ruins in Amakusa, Kumamoto, Japan

- 棚底城跡
- Amakusa, Kumamoto Japan

Site information
- Type: Japanese castle
- Controlled by: Kotsuura clan
- Open to the public: yes
- Condition: Archaeological and designated national historical site; castle ruins

Location
- Coordinates: 32°24′54″N 130°20′03″E

Site history
- Built: Muromachi period
- National Historic Site of Japan

Tanasoko Castle (棚底城跡, Tanasoko-jō) was a Muromachi period Japanese castle located in the Kuratake neighborhood of the city of Amakusa, Kumamoto Prefecture, Japan. Its ruins have been protected as a National Historic Site since 2009.

== Overview ==
Tanasoko Castle is located on the edge of a mountain ridge that branches off to the south from Kuratake, a 682 meter high mountain in the southern part of Kamishima Island in the Amakusa Islands. In the Muromachi period, the Amakusa region was the scene of repeated conflict between five local clans (the Kotsuura, Sumoto, Oyano, Amakusa, and Shiki), and this castle ruins was the site of conflict between two of the five, the Kotsuura and Sumoto clans. The Kotsuura clan held the castle until 1544, after which it fell into the hands of the Sumoto clan, but in 1560, it was returned to the Kotsuura clan through the mediation of the Sagara clan. The castle ruins consist of eight enclosures built at the tail of the mountain ridge, measuring approximately 340 meters from east-to-west. While there are several single-bailey castles ruins from this period in Amakusa, Tanasoko Castle has a complex layout and was also protected by a fortified triple moat built from the north to the east of Bailey. Inside the central enclosure is a group of foundation pillar holes dug into the bedrock, indicating the site of a large building and five rows of small pillar holes. Trade ceramics, Chinese Tenmoku bowls, stone braziers, tea mortars and other Japanese tea ceremony utensils, as well as Go stones, have been excavated from the castle ruins.

== See also ==
- List of Historic Sites of Japan (Kumamoto)

== Literature ==
- Benesch, Oleg and Ran Zwigenberg (2019). Japan's Castles: Citadels of Modernity in War and Peace. Cambridge: Cambridge University Press. p. 374. ISBN 9781108481946.
- De Lange, William (2021). An Encyclopedia of Japanese Castles. Groningen: Toyo Press. pp. 600 pages. ISBN 978-9492722300.
