= Shinwa, Kumamoto =

Dissolved municipality in Kumamoto prefecture, Japan

Shinwa (新和町, Shinwa-machi) was a town located in Amakusa District, Kumamoto Prefecture, Japan.

== Population ==
As of 2003, the town had an estimated population of 4,136 and a density of 74.93 persons per km^{2}. The total area was 55.20 km^{2}.

== History ==
On March 27, 2006, Shinwa, along with the cities of Hondo and Ushibuka, and the towns of Amakusa, Ariake, Goshoura, Itsuwa, Kawaura, Kuratake and Sumoto (all from Amakusa District), was merged to create the new city of Amakusa and no longer exists as an independent municipality.
