= Sumoto, Kumamoto =

Town in Amakusa district, Japan

Sumoto (栖本町, Sumoto-machi) was a town located in Amakusa District, Kumamoto Prefecture, Japan.

As of 2003, the town had an estimated population of 2,903 and a density of 88.32 persons per km^{2}. The total area was 32.87 km^{2}.

On March 27, 2006, Sumoto, along with the cities of Hondo and Ushibuka, and the towns of Amakusa, Ariake, Goshoura, Itsuwa, Kawaura, Kuratake and Shinwa (all from Amakusa District), was merged to create the new city of Amakusa and no longer exists as an independent municipality.
