= Amakusa, Kumamoto (town) =

Dissolved municipality in Kumamoto prefecture, Japan

Amakusa (天草町, Amakusa-machi) was a town located in Amakusa District, Kumamoto Prefecture, Japan.

As of 2003, the town had an estimated population of 4,405 and a density of 51.54 persons per km^{2}. The total area was 85.46 km^{2}.

On March 27, 2006, Amakusa absorbed the cities of Hondo and Ushibuka, the towns of Ariake, Goshoura, Itsuwa, Kawaura, Kuratake, Shinwa and Sumoto (all from Amakusa District) to create the city of Amakusa. "Amakusa City" refers to this union of six towns and two cities, while "Amakusa Town" or "Amakusa-machi" refers to the one town of those six.

Amakusa-machi consists of five hamlets, four spread along the west coast of Shimo-shima and one located in the mountains between the coast and Hondo, the administrative capital of Amakusa City. They are, in order of geographic location starting from the south, Ōe (大江), Takahama (高浜), Shimoda-minami (下田南), Shimoda-kita (下田北), and Fukuregi (福連木).

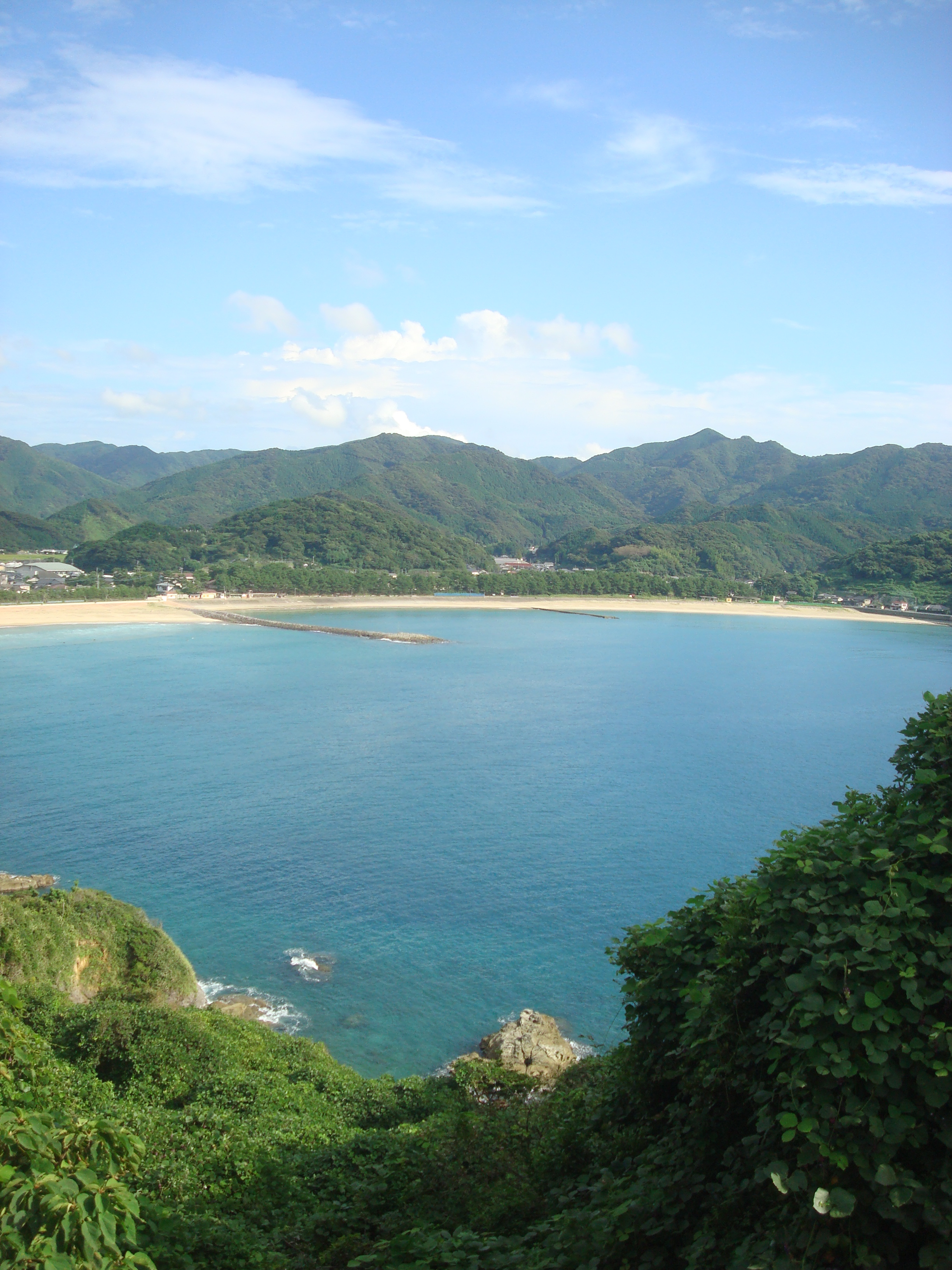
Shiratsuru-hama beach in Takahama

Amakusa-machi is famous for its scenic coastline along the Amakusa-nada sea, including a natural, white sandy beach in Takahama called Shiratsuru-hama 白鶴浜 and beautiful, strange rock formations in the bay Myoken-ura 妙見浦. Shimoda-kita is also home to a famous hot spring which, according to legend, was discovered by a white heron. Many tourists come to Amakusa-machi to enjoy these leisure spots.

The village of Ōe, along with the Sakitsu in Kawaura-machi to the south, were both visited by Christian missionaries in the wake of St. Francis Xavier's mission to Japan in 1549. Many were converted and kept their faith even during the periods of harsh persecution and the Shimabara rebellion. The Romanesque-style church in Ōe and the gothic-style church in Sakitsu have both become symbols of Amakusa's Christian history, and are visited by many throughout the year. Museums located in both Kawaura and Ōe exhibit various artifacts from the time of Christian persecution that show how the Japanese Christians of that time kept their faith.

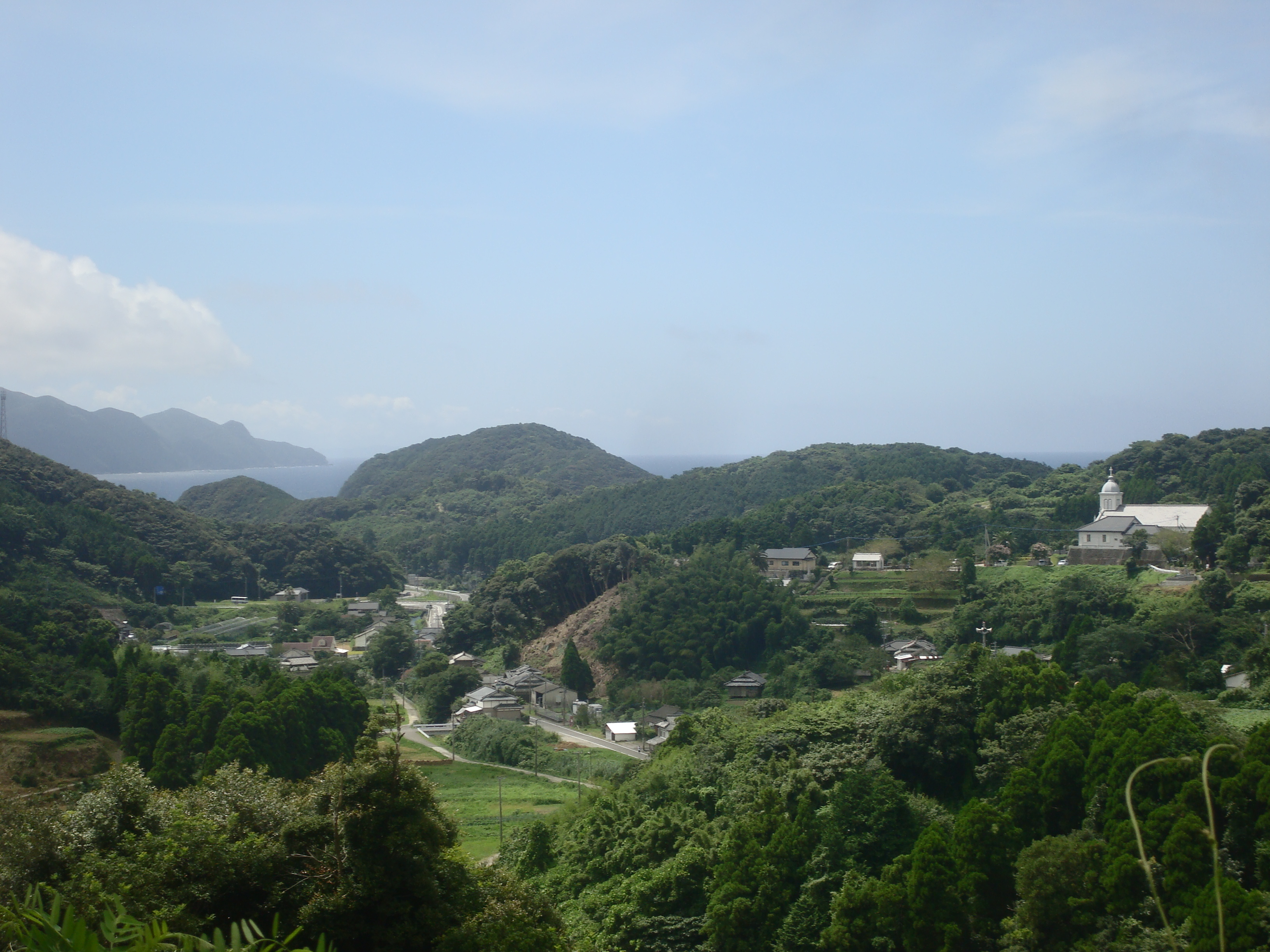
Ōe Village, with its church standing on the hill at right.

Between the five villages of the town, there used to be as many as five elementary schools, four junior high schools, and one high school, with the total junior high school population reaching as high as 800 students. A steep decline in the population has reduced the elementary and junior high schools to one each, both located in Takahama. The junior high school student population is around 75, while the total elementary school population is around 115. The high school, also located in Takahama, is closing in March 2015.
