= Sakitsu Church =

- カトリック﨑津教会
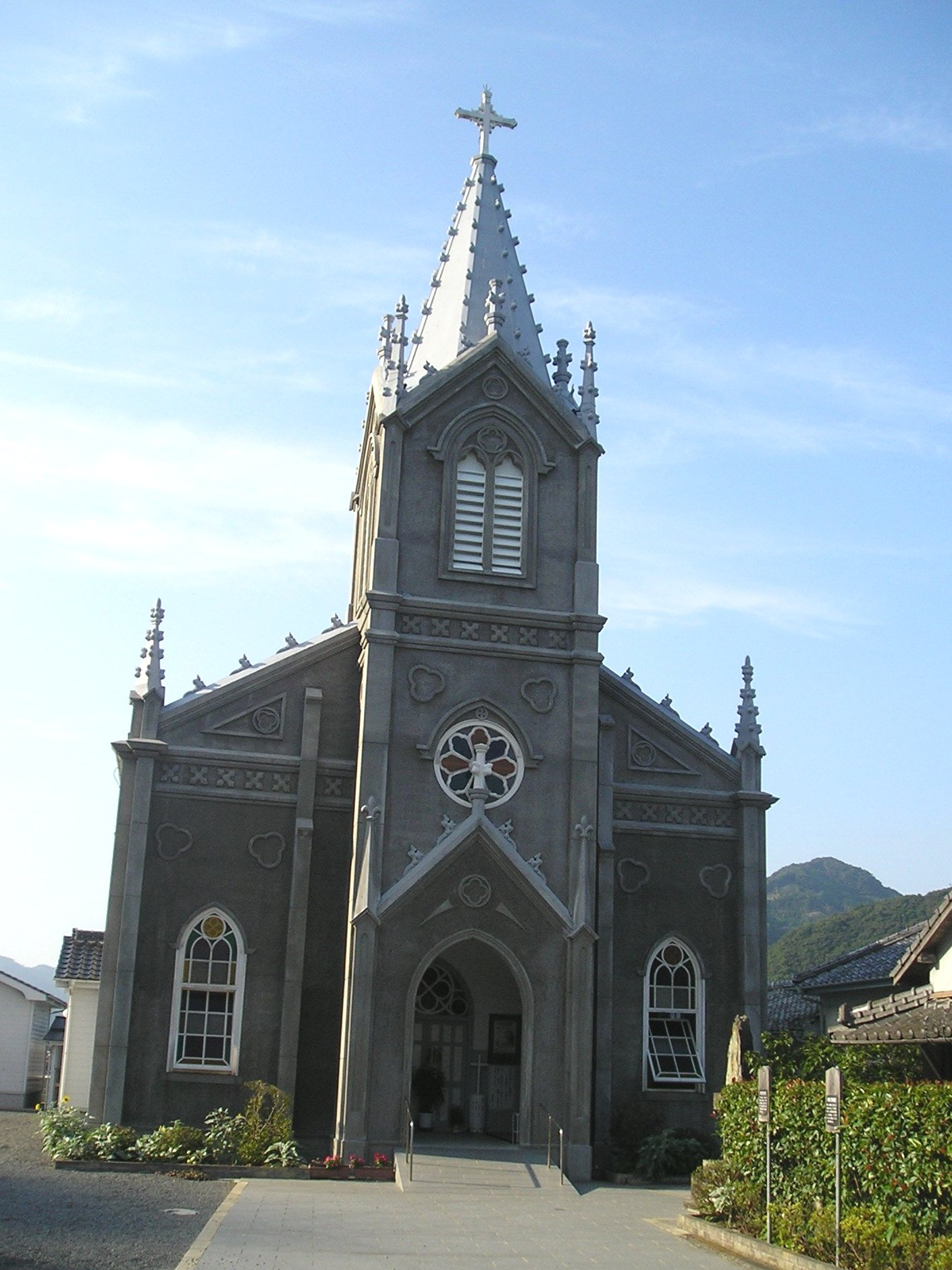
- The church's exterior in August 2009

- Location of the church Sakitsu Church (Japan)
- 32.3124°N 130.0258°E
- Location: Amakusa, Kumamoto
- Country: Japan
- Denomination: Roman Catholic
- Website: kyoukaigun.jp/en/visit/sakitsu.php

Architecture
- Style: Gothic
- Completed: 1934

Administration
- Diocese: Diocese of Fukuoka

UNESCO World Heritage Site
- Part of: Hidden Christian Sites in the Nagasaki Region
- Criteria: Cultural: iii
- Reference: 1495-004
- Inscription: 2018 (42nd Session)

Sakitsu Church is a Catholic church in Amakusa, Kumamoto, Japan.

It was first constructed in 1888 but it was renovated and moved to its current location in 1934. It was inscribed as a World Heritage Site in 2018 along with the rest of Sakitsu village. It forms part of the Hidden Christian Sites in the Nagasaki Region World Heritage Site and is the World Heritage Site's only location outside of Nagasaki Prefecture.

== History ==
In 1569 the small fishing village of Sakitsu was visited by Portuguese missionary Luis de Almeida. In 1596 when Toyotomi Hideyoshi banned Christianity in Japan much of the local population had already been converted to the Catholic Church. Despite the ban many residents of Sakitsu continued practicing their faith in secret. During the sixteenth century many of Sakitsu's residence started using everyday household items for Christian worship instead of Christian devotional objects during the 16th century Sakitsu became the center of Hidden Christians in Amakusa. The first church in Sakitsu opened in 1888 but the church was renovated and moved to its current location in 1934. French missionary, Augustin Halbout funded the renovation and purchased the premises of the former village head man as land for the new church.

In 2018 it was inscribed as a Unesco World Heritage Site as part of the Hidden Christian Sites in the Nagasaki. Both Sakitsu Church and the surrounding village of Sakitsu were inscribed due to preserving a distinctive religious tradition nurtured by Hidden Christians.

== Architecture ==
Sakitsu Church was built with a Gothic design. The design was done by Tetsukawa Yosuke and it was constructed using wood and concrete. High steeples jut from the church's roof and its interior has tatami flooring. The altar of the church was placed at the former site of a fumi-e (a picture of a Christian figure to be stepped upon by suspected Christians).
