= Ushibuka, Kumamoto =

Dissolved municipality in Kumamoto prefecture, Japan

Coordinates: 32°11′N 130°01′E

Ushibuka (牛深市, Ushibuka-shi) was a city located in Kumamoto Prefecture, Japan. The city was founded on April 1, 1954.

As of 2003, the city had an estimated population of 17,429 and the density of 194.17 persons per km^{2}. The total area was 89.76 km^{2}.

On March 27, 2006, Ushibuka, along with the city of Hondo, and the towns of Amakusa, Ariake, Goshoura, Itsuwa, Kawaura, Kuratake, Shinwa and Sumoto (all from Amakusa District), was merged to create the new city of Amakusa and no longer exists as an independent municipality.

== Climate ==
Climate data for Ushibuka (1991−2020 normals, extremes 1949−present)
Month	Jan	Feb	Mar	Apr	May	Jun	Jul	Aug	Sep	Oct	Nov	Dec	Year
Record high °C (°F)	21.8 (71.2)	23.6 (74.5)	24.6 (76.3)	29.2 (84.6)	32.3 (90.1)	33.9 (93.0)	37.5 (99.5)	39.6 (103.3)	37.1 (98.8)	34.0 (93.2)	28.2 (82.8)	24.0 (75.2)	39.6 (103.3)
Mean maximum °C (°F)	17.9 (64.2)	19.1 (66.4)	21.8 (71.2)	25.2 (77.4)	28.6 (83.5)	30.4 (86.7)	34.3 (93.7)	35.8 (96.4)	33.4 (92.1)	29.7 (85.5)	24.6 (76.3)	20.0 (68.0)	36.5 (97.7)
Mean daily maximum °C (°F)	11.8 (53.2)	13.0 (55.4)	16.1 (61.0)	20.3 (68.5)	24.2 (75.6)	26.5 (79.7)	30.4 (86.7)	32.2 (90.0)	29.6 (85.3)	25.0 (77.0)	19.6 (67.3)	14.2 (57.6)	21.9 (71.4)
Daily mean °C (°F)	8.6 (47.5)	9.4 (48.9)	12.2 (54.0)	16.3 (61.3)	20.1 (68.2)	23.1 (73.6)	27.0 (80.6)	28.3 (82.9)	25.6 (78.1)	21.1 (70.0)	16.0 (60.8)	10.8 (51.4)	18.2 (64.8)
Mean daily minimum °C (°F)	5.5 (41.9)	6.0 (42.8)	8.6 (47.5)	12.6 (54.7)	16.6 (61.9)	20.5 (68.9)	24.3 (75.7)	25.4 (77.7)	22.7 (72.9)	17.8 (64.0)	12.8 (55.0)	7.6 (45.7)	15.0 (59.1)
Mean minimum °C (°F)	0.7 (33.3)	1.0 (33.8)	3.3 (37.9)	7.2 (45.0)	12.5 (54.5)	16.8 (62.2)	21.2 (70.2)	22.7 (72.9)	18.4 (65.1)	12.6 (54.7)	5.3 (41.5)	2.1 (35.8)	−0.2 (31.6)
Record low °C (°F)	−3.4 (25.9)	−3.4 (25.9)	−1.6 (29.1)	2.0 (35.6)	9.4 (48.9)	12.6 (54.7)	18.0 (64.4)	18.8 (65.8)	14.1 (57.4)	7.4 (45.3)	2.8 (37.0)	−1.5 (29.3)	−3.4 (25.9)
Average precipitation mm (inches)	79.7 (3.14)	95.4 (3.76)	124.7 (4.91)	158.1 (6.22)	178.7 (7.04)	409.6 (16.13)	348.9 (13.74)	200.7 (7.90)	204.0 (8.03)	96.5 (3.80)	106.5 (4.19)	96.4 (3.80)	2,109.8 (83.06)
Average snowfall cm (inches)	1 (0.4)	1 (0.4)	0 (0)	0 (0)	0 (0)	0 (0)	0 (0)	0 (0)	0 (0)	0 (0)	0 (0)	0 (0)	1 (0.4)
Average precipitation days (≥ 1.0 mm)	10.6	9.6	11.1	10.0	9.5	14.3	10.4	9.5	9.5	6.5	8.6	10.0	119.6
Average snowy days (≥ 1 cm)	0.3	0.4	0	0	0	0	0	0	0	0	0	0	0.7
Average relative humidity (%)	65	64	66	69	73	82	82	77	73	66	67	65	71
Mean monthly sunshine hours	105.4	121.7	160.9	180.9	189.7	124.1	193.1	227.9	192.0	191.0	147.2	118.4	1,954.5
Source: JMA
