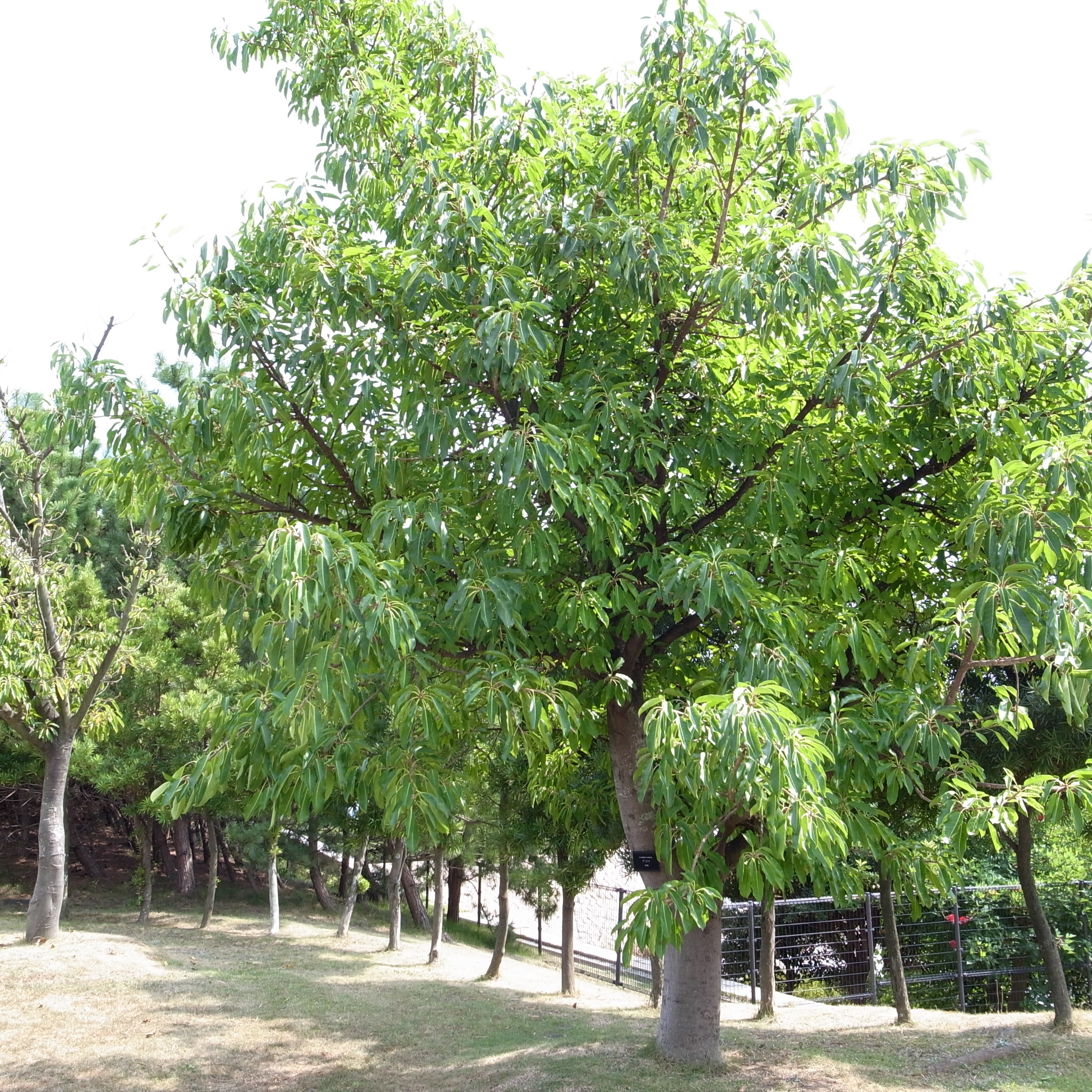
- Sea Fig in Japan

Conservation status
- Least Concern (IUCN 3.1)

Scientific classification
- Kingdom: Plantae
- Clade: Tracheophytes
- Clade: Angiosperms
- Clade: Eudicots
- Clade: Rosids
- Order: Rosales
- Family: Moraceae
- Genus: Ficus
- Subgenus: F. subg. Urostigma
- Species: F. superba

Binomial name
- Ficus superba (Miq.) Miq.

Synonyms
- Ficus petiolata Reinw. ex Miq.; Ficus tenuipes S.Moore; Ficus timorensis Decne.; Urostigma accedens Miq.; Urostigma superbum Miq.

= Ficus superba =

Sea fig

Species of epiphyte

Ficus superba, also known as sea fig or deciduous fig, is a hemiepiphytic tree of genus Ficus. It is a tree native to Indochina (Cambodia, Laos, Myanmar, Thailand, and Vietnam), southern India, and parts of Malesia (Peninsular Malaysia, Sumatra, Java, the Lesser Sunda Islands, Sulawesi, and the Maluku Islands including Seram). It is one of the species known as banyans or "strangler figs" because of its potential to grow as a hemi-epiphyte and eventually progress to the strangling habit of species in this subgenus. It is, however, not an obligate hemi-epiphyte and can be found growing as single stemmed trees in forests. According to E.J.H. Corner, if this fig germinates in a boulder field its roots can extend "extraordinary distances, up to several hundred feet" over and between the rocks.

== Formerly recognized varieties ==
Several varieties are now recognized as synonyms of other species:

- F. superba var. alongensis (Gagnep.) Corner is a synonym of Ficus alongensis Gagnep.
- Ficus superba var. henneana is a synonym of Ficus henneana, native to northern and eastern Australia.
- F. superba var. japonica Miq. is a synonym of Ficus subpisocarpa Gagnep.

== Gallery ==
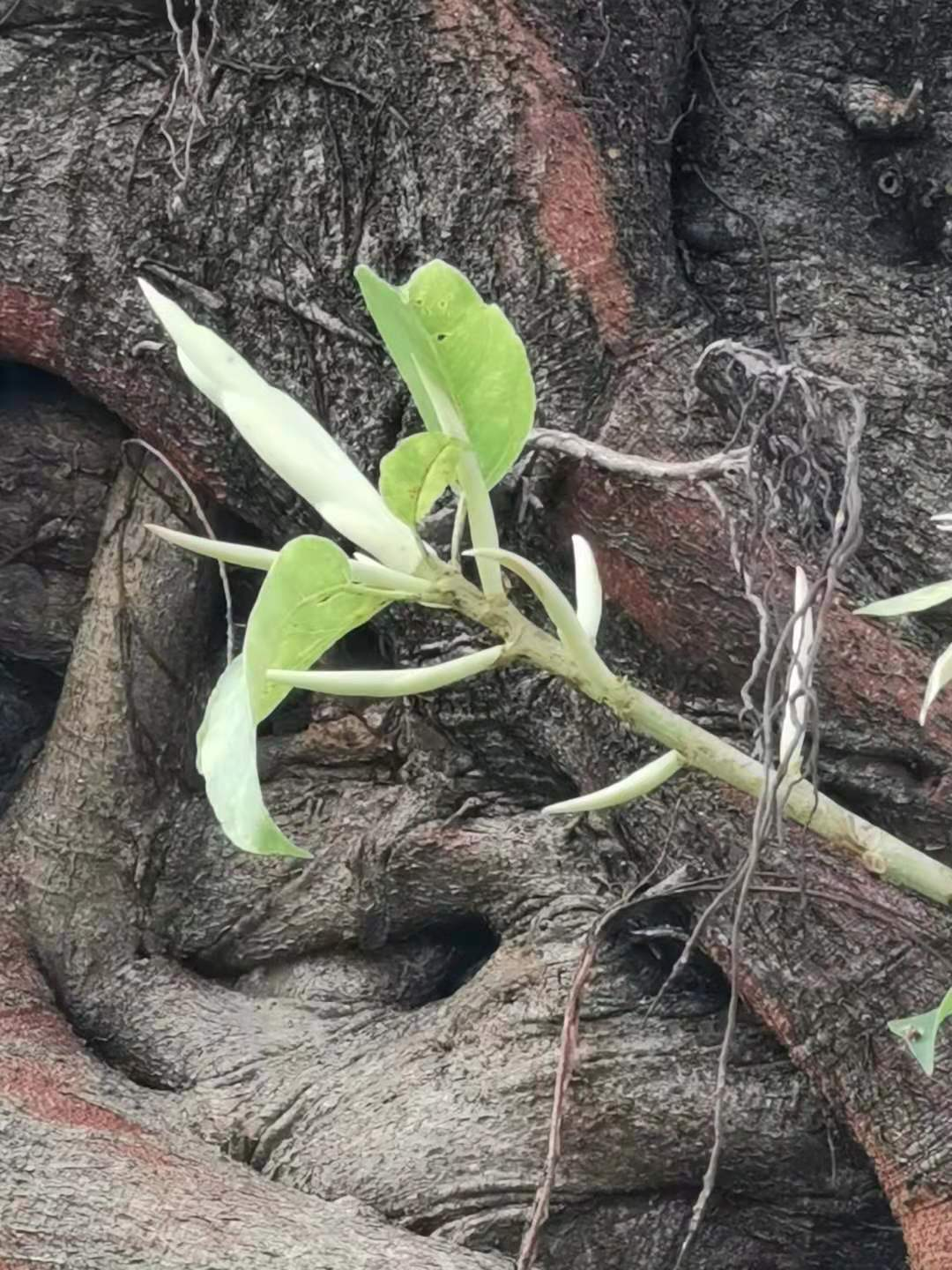
New buds.

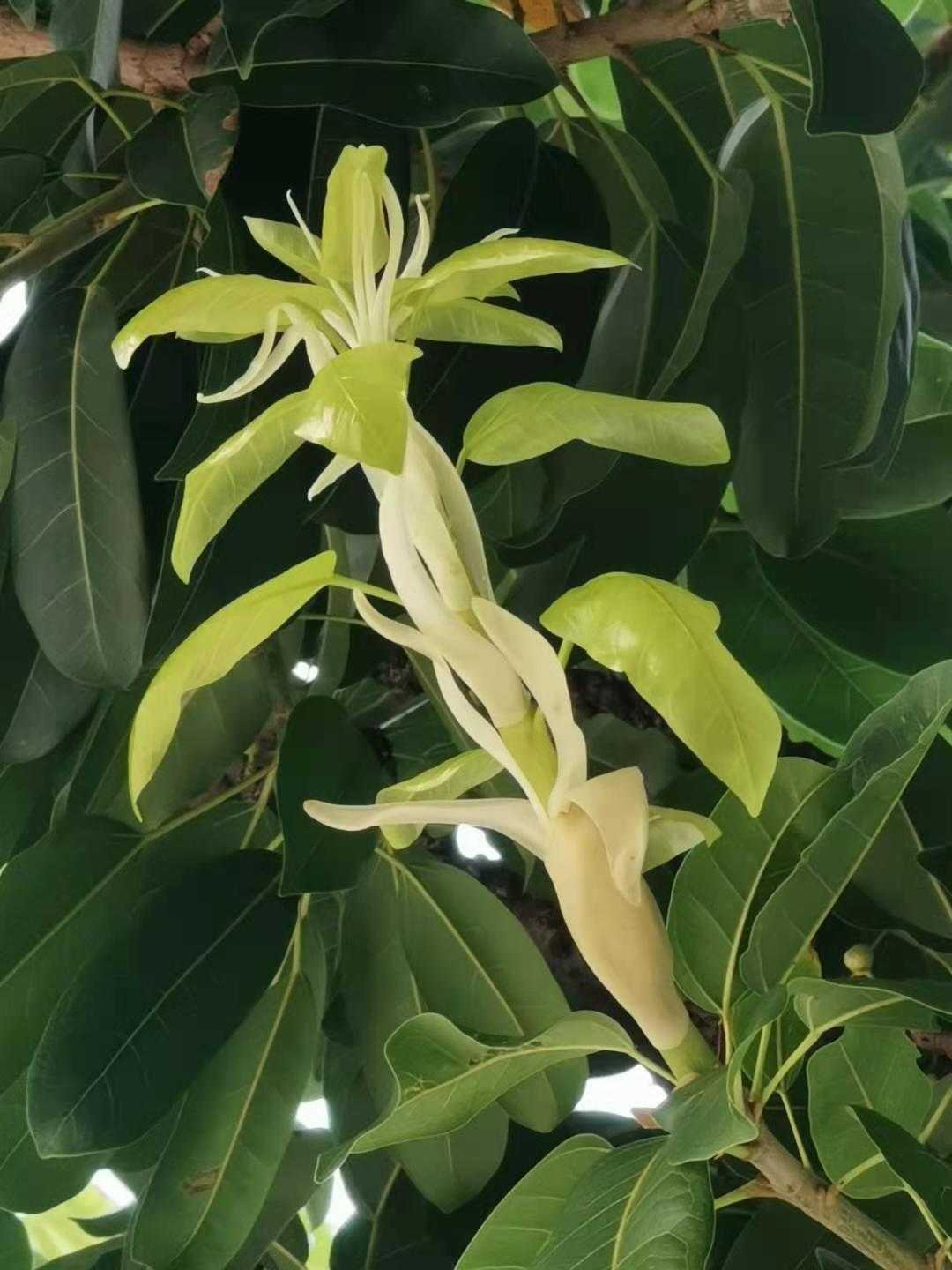
New bud with bud scales.

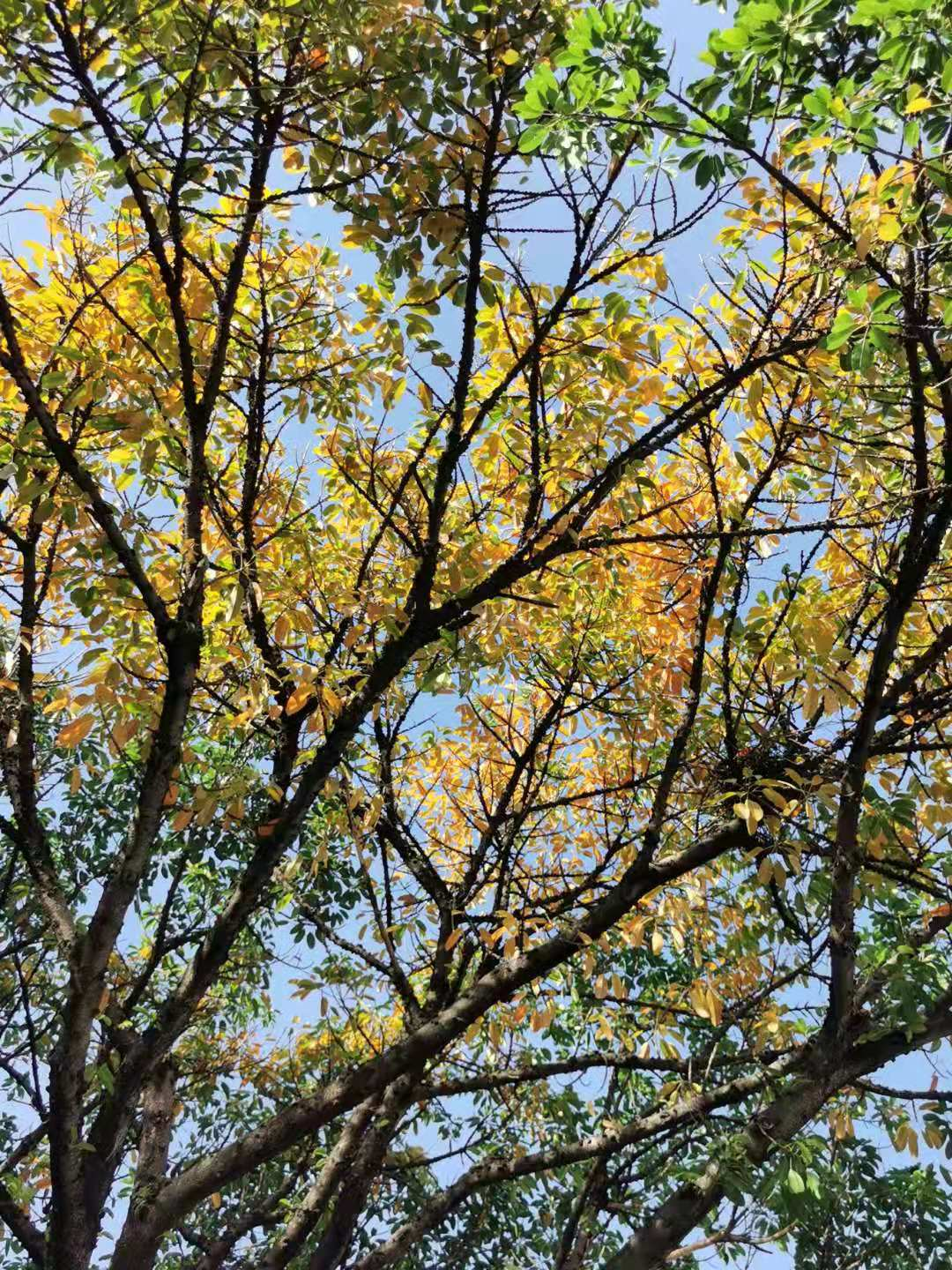
The leaves turn golden before falling.

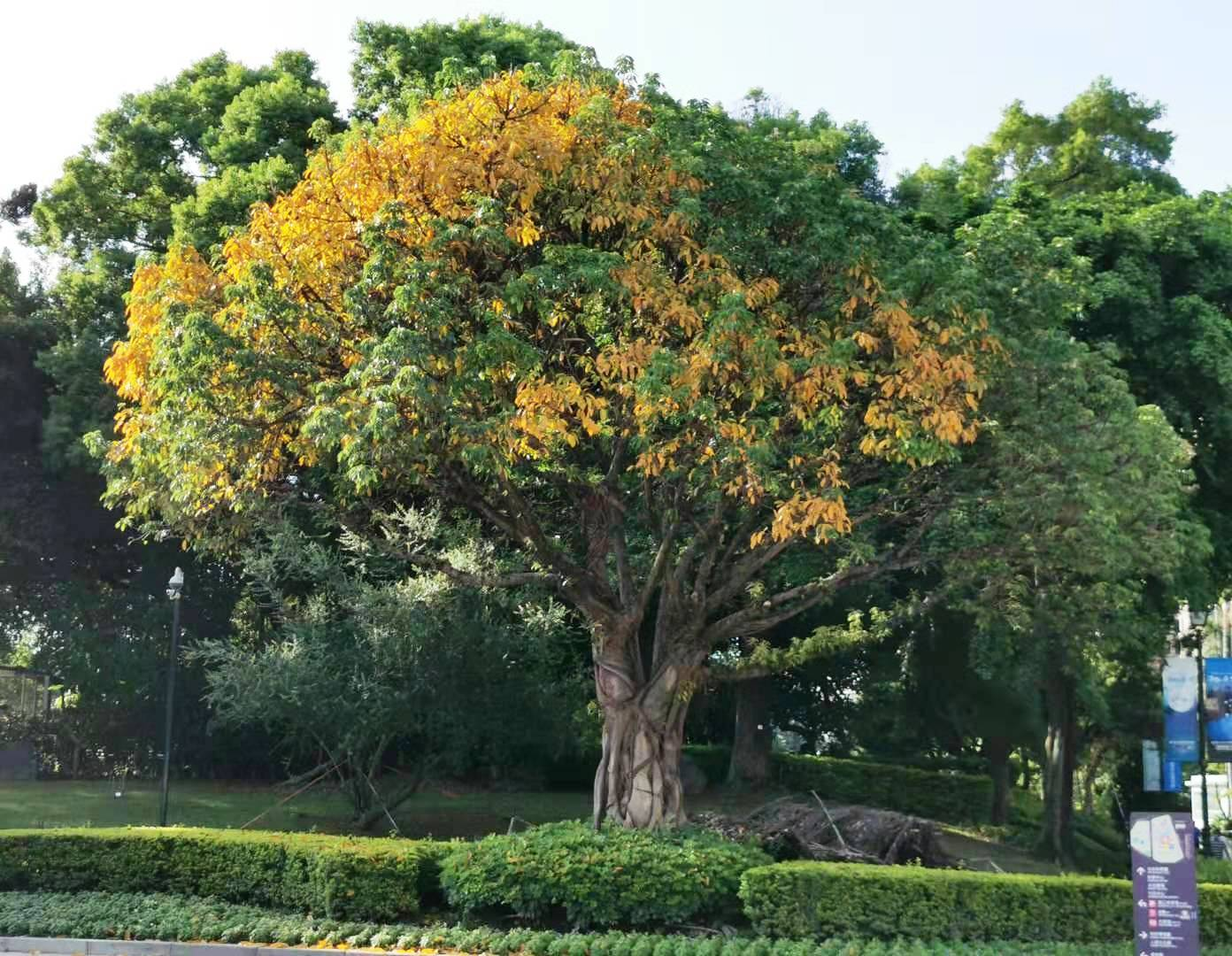
The leaves fall 2 to 4 times a year. It only takes about 2 weeks to grow new leaves after deciduous leaves.

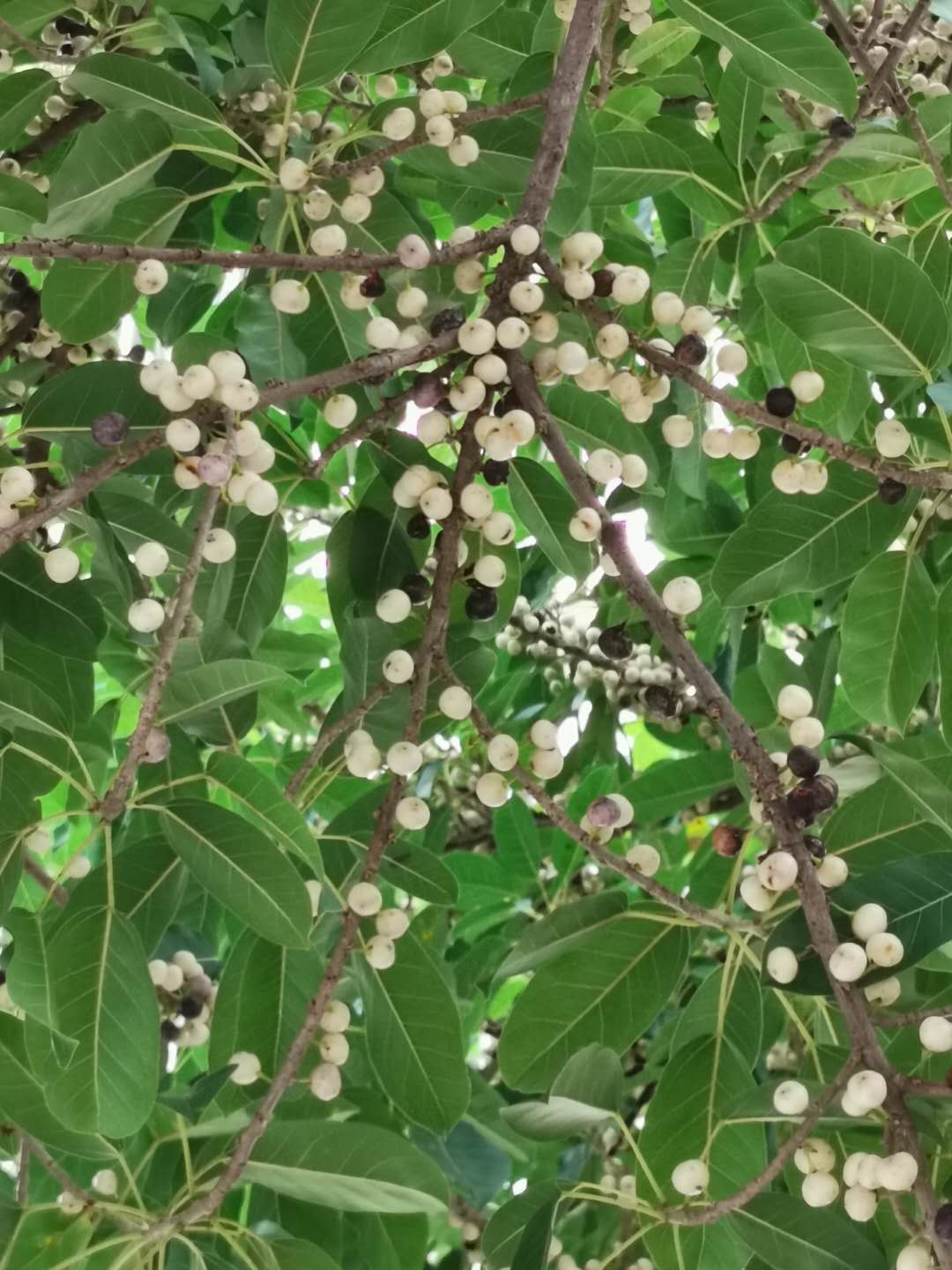
Immatured syconus. It is red when mature.

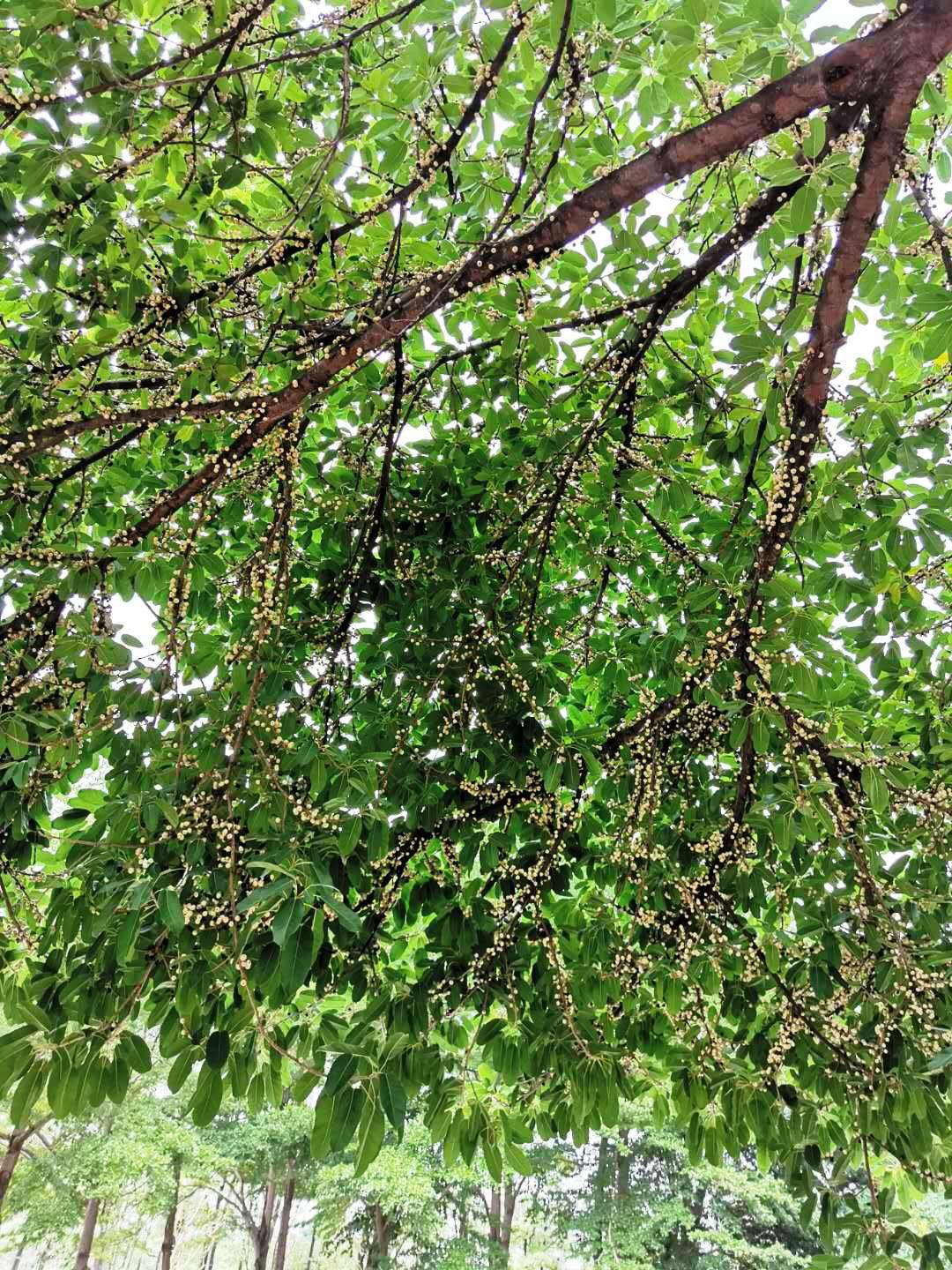
The syconus grow densely. It's the food that the birds like.

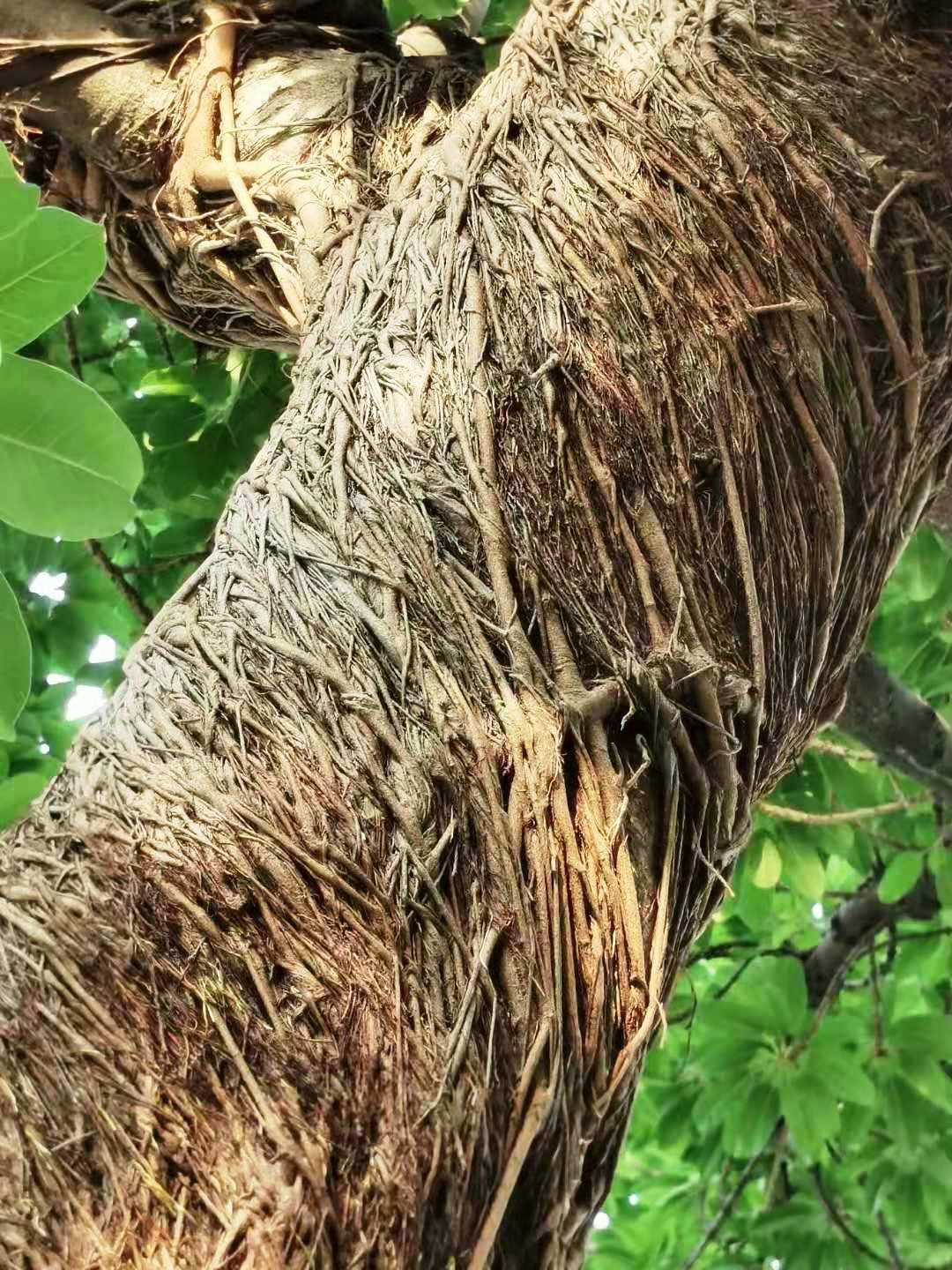
Tree trunk and aerial roots.

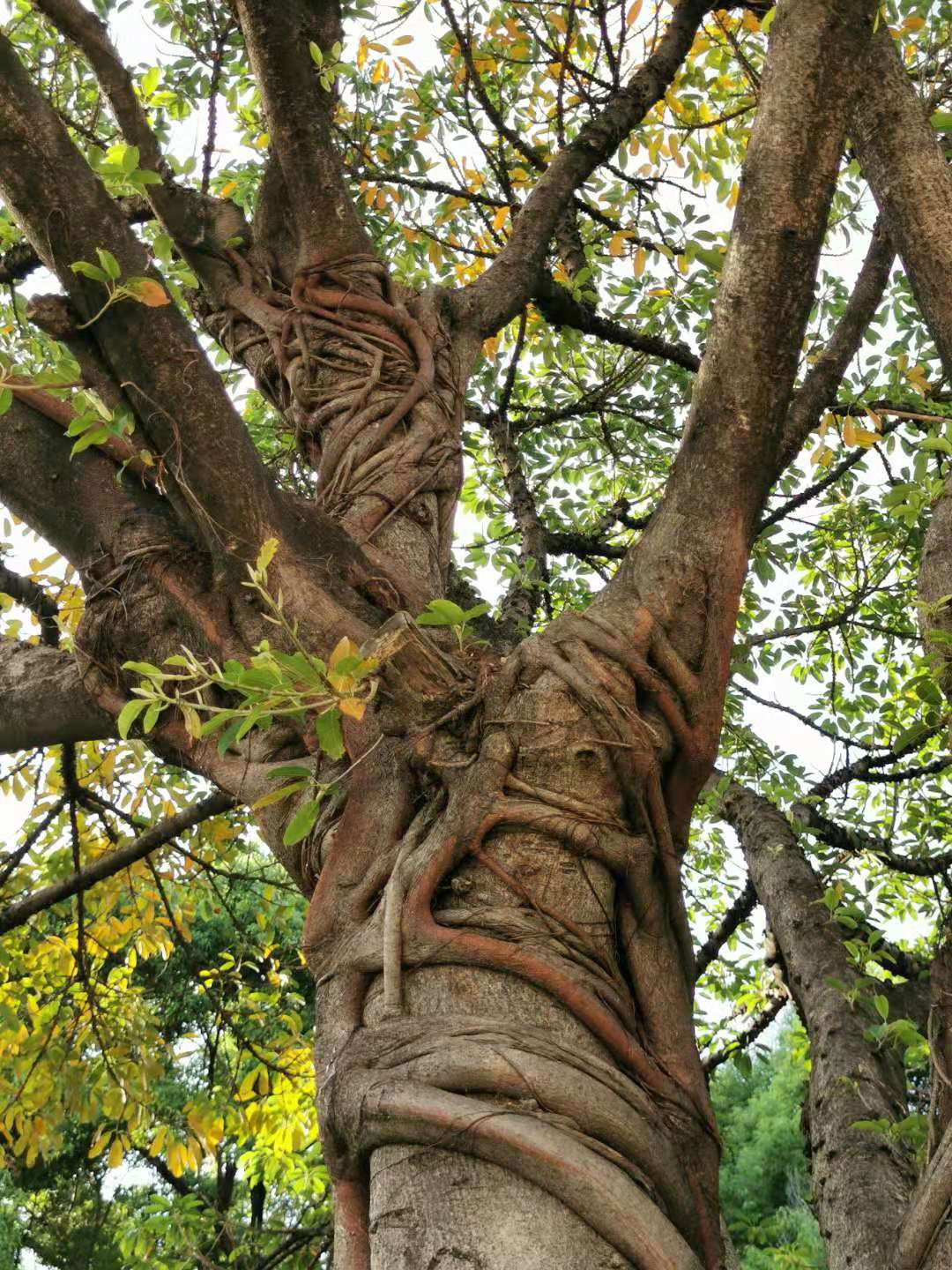
Tree trunk and aerial roots.
