= Kawaura, Kumamoto =

Dissolved municipality in Kumamoto prefecture, Japan

Kawaura (河浦町, Kawaura-machi) was a town located in Amakusa District, Kumamoto Prefecture, Japan.

As of 2003, the town had an estimated population of 6,047 and a density of 50.69 persons per km^{2}. The total area was 119.30 km^{2}.

On March 27, 2006, Kawaura, along with the cities of Hondo and Ushibuka, and the towns of Amakusa, Ariake, Goshoura, Itsuwa, Kuratake, Shinwa and Sumoto (all from Amakusa District), was merged to create the new city of Amakusa and no longer exists as an independent municipality.
