= Itsuwa, Kumamoto =

Dissolved municipality in Kumamoto prefecture, Japan

Itsuwa (五和町, Itsuwa-machi) was a town located in Amakusa District, Kumamoto Prefecture, Japan.

As of 2003, the town had an estimated population of 10,344 and a density of 206.63 persons per km^{2}. The total area was 50.06 km^{2}.

On March 27, 2006, Itsuwa, along with the cities of Hondo and Ushibuka, and the towns of Amakusa, Ariake, Goshoura, Kawaura, Kuratake, Shinwa and Sumoto (all from Amakusa District), was merged to create the new city of Amakusa and no longer exists as an independent municipality.

== Transport ==
Ferry from Itsuwa Oniike on the north of the Amakusa Peninsular to Kuchinotsu at the southern tip of the Minamishimbara Peninsula is run by the Shimbara Railway Co. Services operate frequently daily.
