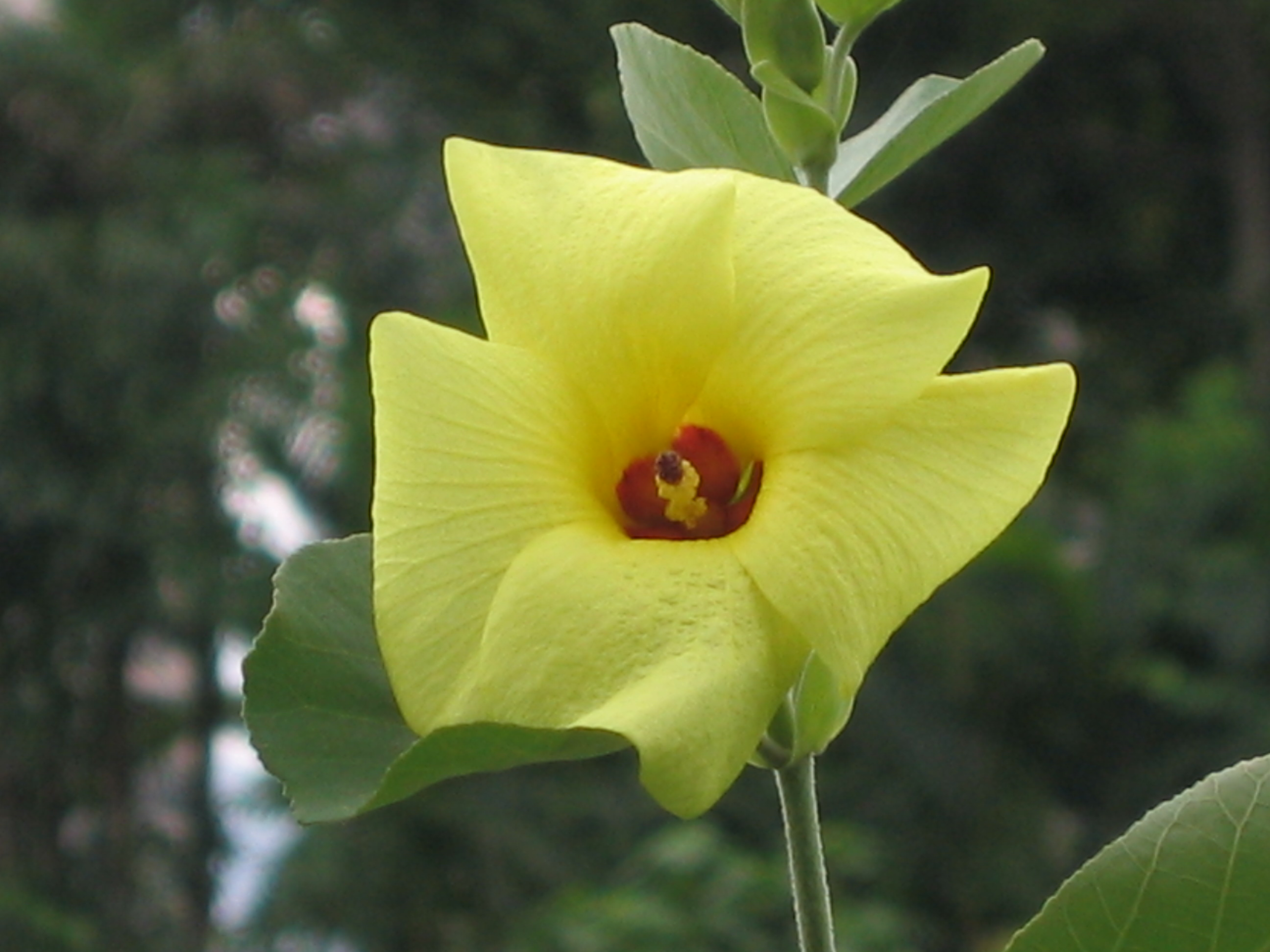

Scientific classification
- Kingdom: Plantae
- Clade: Tracheophytes
- Clade: Angiosperms
- Clade: Eudicots
- Clade: Rosids
- Order: Malvales
- Family: Malvaceae
- Genus: Hibiscus
- Species: H. hamabo

Binomial name
- Hibiscus hamabo Siebold & Zuccarini

= Hibiscus hamabo =

Species of flowering plant

Hibiscus hamabo, the hardy yellow hibiscus, is a species of shrub in the genus Hibiscus that is native to the coastlines of China, Japan, and Korea. It is characterized by yellow flower coloring as well as orbicular shaped leaves. In its native environment it is a perennial.

== Distribution ==
Hibiscus hamabo is a small tree/shrub found naturally near the coastal sands of Japan and Korea. This plant grows near sea level which means it needs to be highly salt-resistant. The water near the coastal sands of Japan and Korea are high in concentrations of salt. H. hamabo was also introduced and cultivated in India and the Pacific Islands. H. hamabo can effectively be cultivated in USDA zones 8–13. It is much better acclimated to the cold weather than Hibiscus tiliaceus which is one of the reasons for it possibly being grown in gardens. It can be grown in gardens that have well-drained soils, sufficient sun exposure, moderate drought exposure and is tolerant to different levels of salt.

== Habitat and ecology ==
From the Malvaceae family, H. hamabo is a terrestrial exotic perennial plant native to coastal regions of Asia, including China, Korea, and Japan. It is primarily found in coastal sands near sea levels and can grow 1–5 m tall. It is adapted to precipitation zones that range from 8b–13a and can sustain 60–90 °F (16–32 °C) temperatures. It prefers warm, wet conditions and average, moist, well-drained, fertile soils. However, it is more cold tolerant than other Hibiscus, like the Hibiscus rosa-siennis, and is drought tolerant once established. H. hamabo is a semi-mangrove species adaptive with strong salt tolerance and waterlogging stress. Unfortunately, there is not enough information on the interaction of this plant with other species.

Hibiscus hamabo is unique to most hibiscus plants. It fertilizes mid to late spring, closer to the summertime, and blooms every year during the summer period. H. hamabo is a halophyte with strong salt resistance that grows well in habitats with NaCl concentrations ranging from 1.1 to 1.5 %. H. hamabo is currently considered one of the best afforestation species for amelioration of soil salinization in coastal areas of eastern China. So far, only a few studies have investigated the mechanism of salt tolerance in H. hamabo, and a few have tested the changes in physiological properties in response to different salinity levels.

== Morphology ==
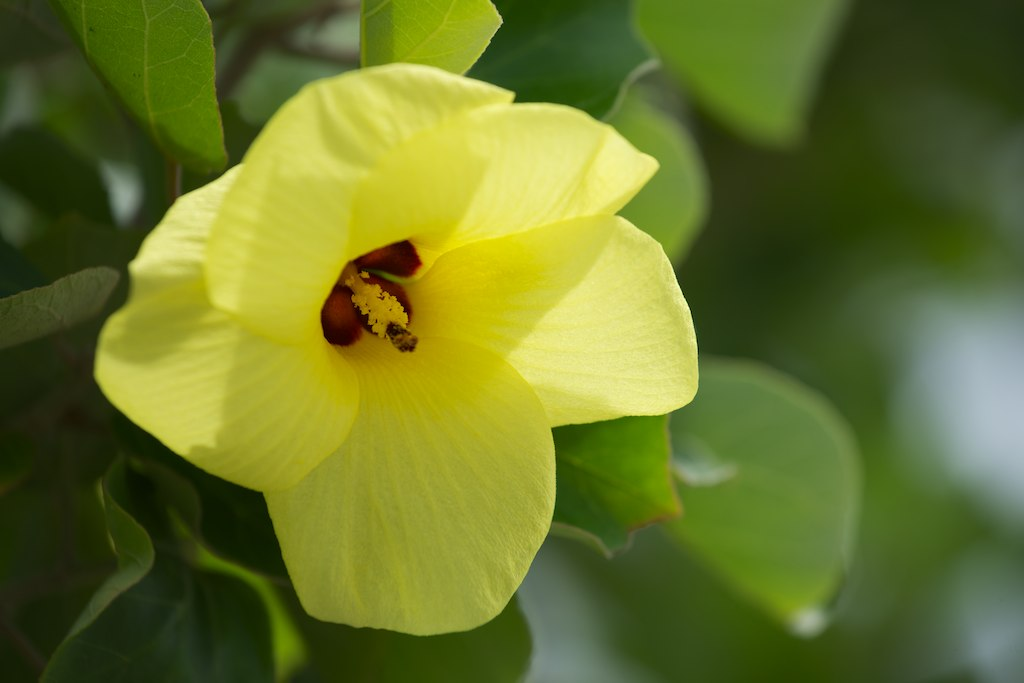
Closeup of Hibiscus hamabo Flower

Hibiscus hamabo height ranges from 1 to 5 meters tall. They're deciduous large shrubs/small trees which grow upright. The bark is dark brown or dark gray with vertical fissures.

Hibiscus hamabo foliage is green, obovate or ovate shaped, and typically 1 to 3 inches long. Each leaf has a smooth top and a dense hairy underside. These leaves have 5 to 7 basal veins. Petioles are a gray/green color and range from 0.5 to 1 inch long. Stipules are 1 cm long. Foliage is generally thick and soft to the touch.

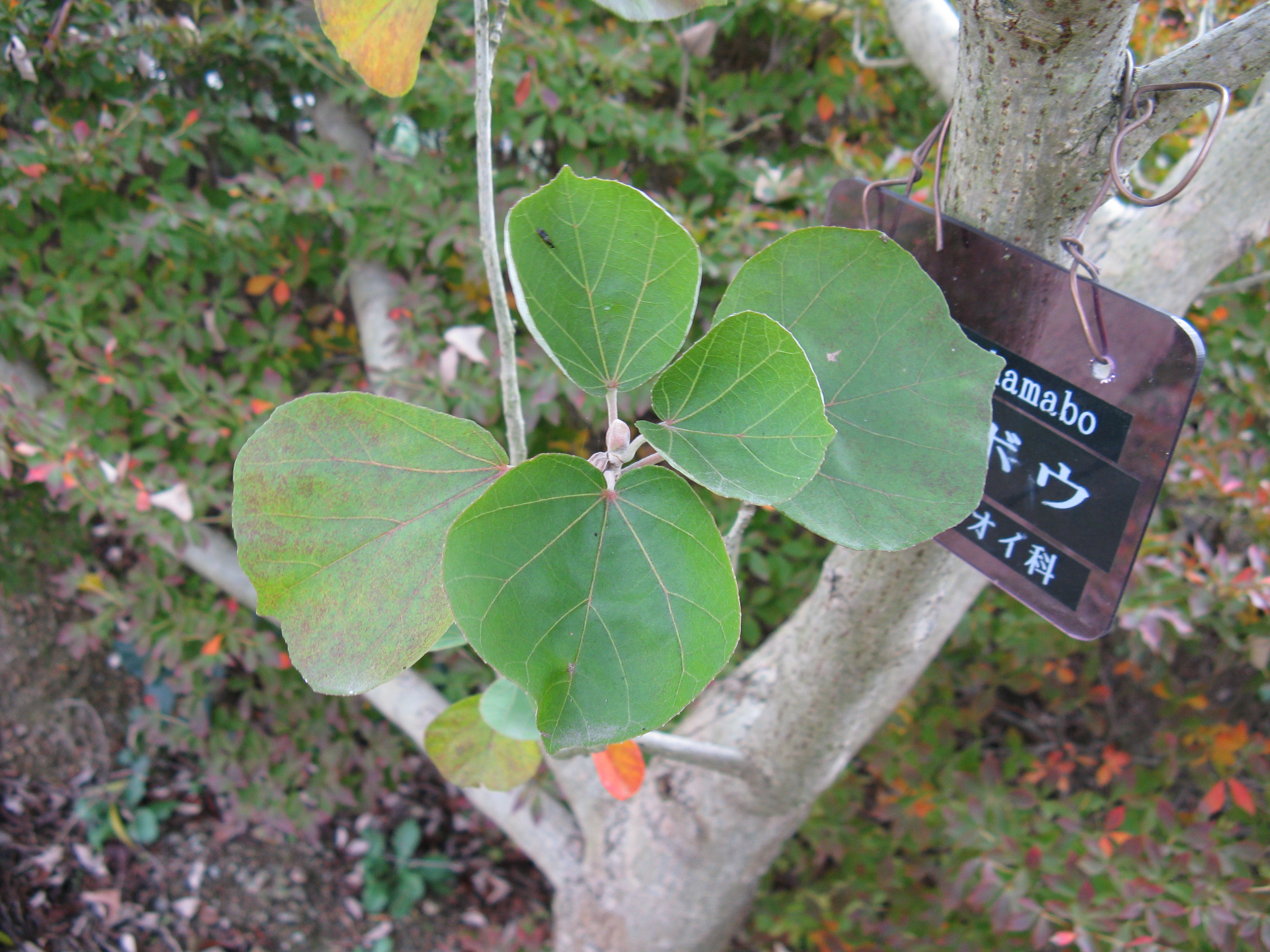
Hibiscus hamabo Leaves

Flowers are 3 to 6 inches wide. They range from yellow to soft orange in color and fade out from an orange or dark red core. Flowers are usually found alone but can also be found in cymes or in axillary clusters. They begin to bloom in late spring and stay till mid-fall. These flowers produce a mild fragrance. H. hamabo participates in sexual reproduction. The center of the flower is where the reproductive organs are located. H. hamabo has both male and female reproductive organs. The stamen, the male reproductive organ, is dark brown or dark red in color and the anthers are yellow. The pistil, the female reproductive organ is a dark brown/ dark red in color and longer than the stamen. The fruit is a brown or copper-colored capsule 2.5 to 3.5 centimeters long and covered in brown hair.

== Flowers and fruit ==
Flowering typically starts in July and lasts until August. Similar to other Hibiscus, pollinators of this species include birds and insects such as bees, moths, and butterflies. Self-pollination is also possible, with fruit and seed production and quality being higher than some other Hibiscus species that are self-pollinated. However, inbreeding depression can occur in populations where self-pollination is frequent.

The fruit is commonly preyed upon by insects such as moth larvae, which bore into the fruit. Rehimena surusalis is a known predator of various hibiscus species, including H. hamabo.

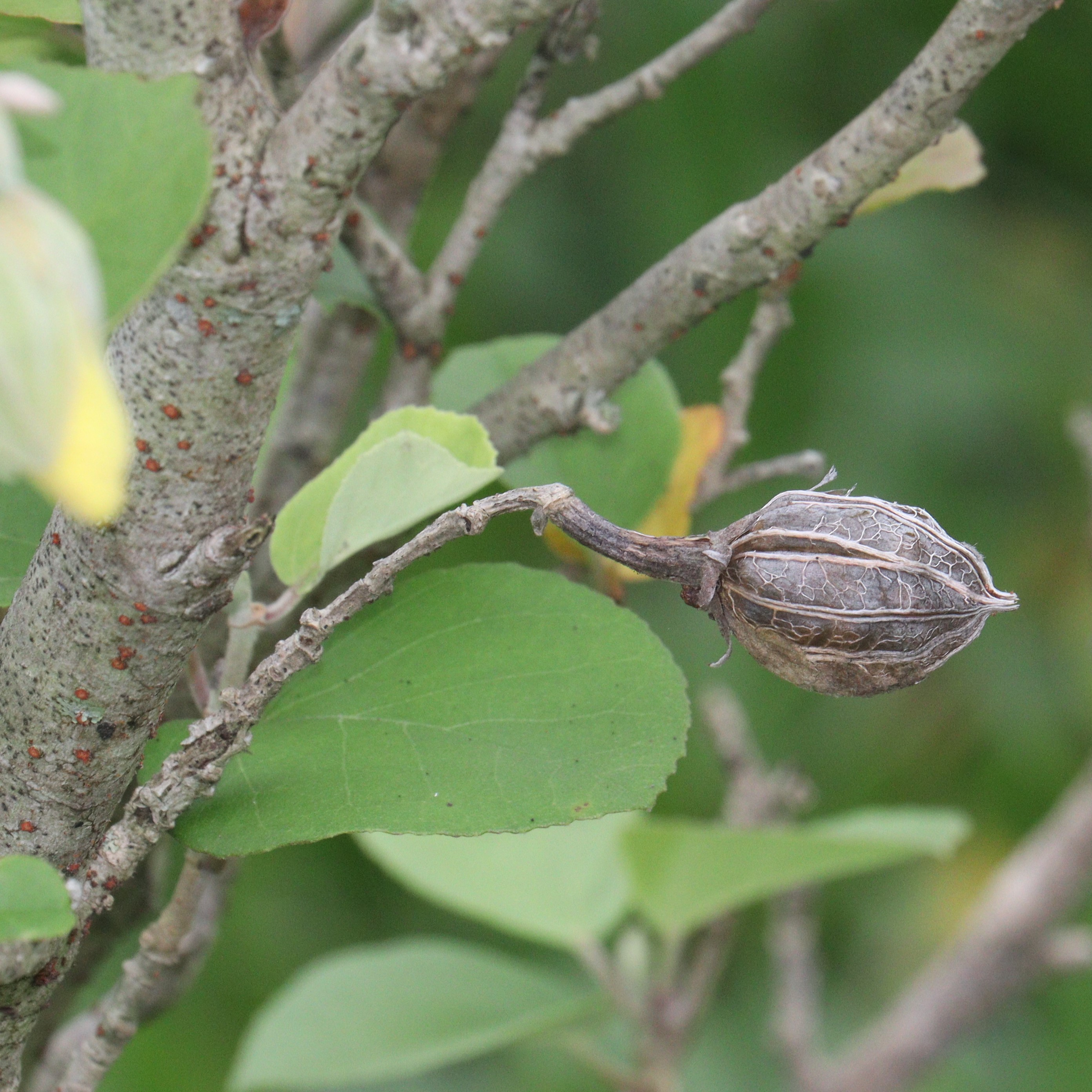
Fruit of Hibiscus hamabo
