= 2026 Kumamoto earthquake =

Fatal disaster in southern Japan

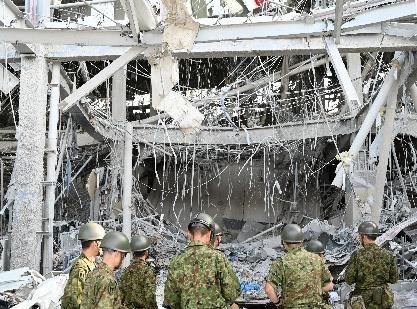
- JGSDF personnel inspecting the partially collapsed AEON Mall Kumamoto in Kashima

- Location within Japan
- UTC time: 2026-07-28 07:27:15
- ISC event: 646050065
- USGS-ANSS: ComCat
- Local date: 28 July 2026
- Local time: 16:27:15 JST (UTC+9)
- Duration: 16 seconds
- Magnitude: M_{w} 6.8 M_{JMA} 7.1
- Depth: 16 km (9.9 mi)
- Epicenter: 32.682°N 130.722°E
- Fault: Hinagu Fault
- Type: Strike-slip
- Areas affected: Kumamoto, Nagasaki, Kagoshima, Ōita and Fukuoka Prefectures, Japan
- Total damage: US$7.6 billion
- Max. intensity: JMA 7 (MMI IX)
- Peak acceleration: 2.49 g
- Peak velocity: 94.26 cm (3.093 ft)/s
- Casualties: 38 dead, 368 injured

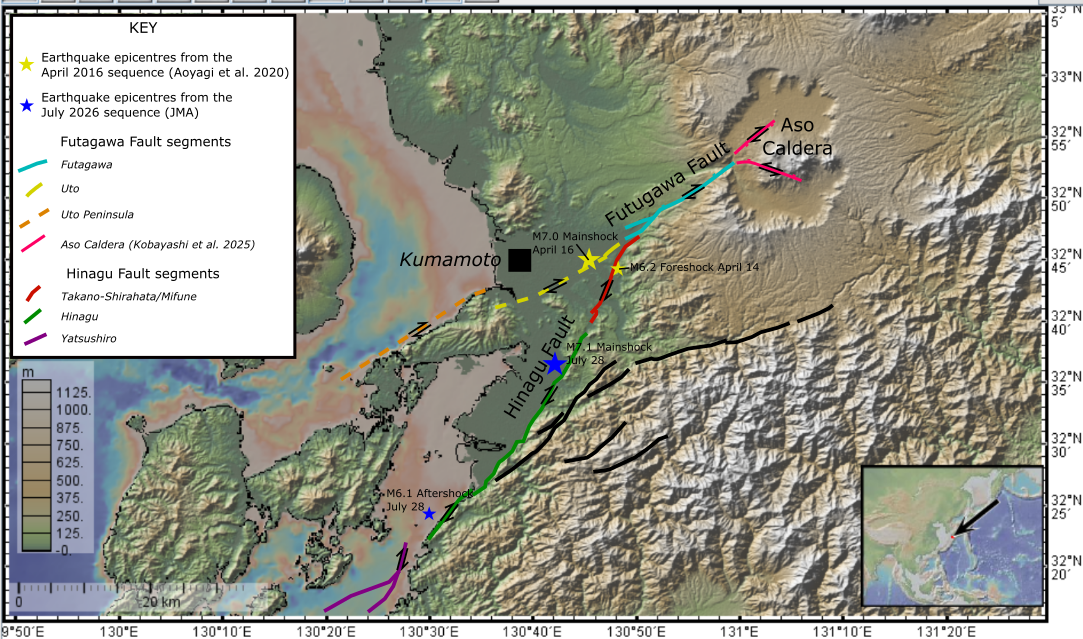
Map of the Futagawa-Hinagu fault zone, showing the location of the July 28 mainshock and the largest aftershock. The foreshock and mainshock of the April 2016 sequence are also shown

On 28 July 2026 at approximately 16:27:15 JST (07:27:15 UTC), an earthquake struck Kumamoto Prefecture in southern Japan with a magnitude of M_{ww} 6.8 (M_{JMA} 7.1) at a depth of 10 km (6.2 mi), later revised to 16 km (9.9 mi). At least 38 people were killed and more than 368 were injured.

The Japan Meteorological Agency (JMA) has officially named the earthquake the 2026 Kumamoto earthquake (Japanese: 令和8年熊本地震, Hepburn: Reiwa 8-nen Kumamoto jishin).

== Earthquake ==
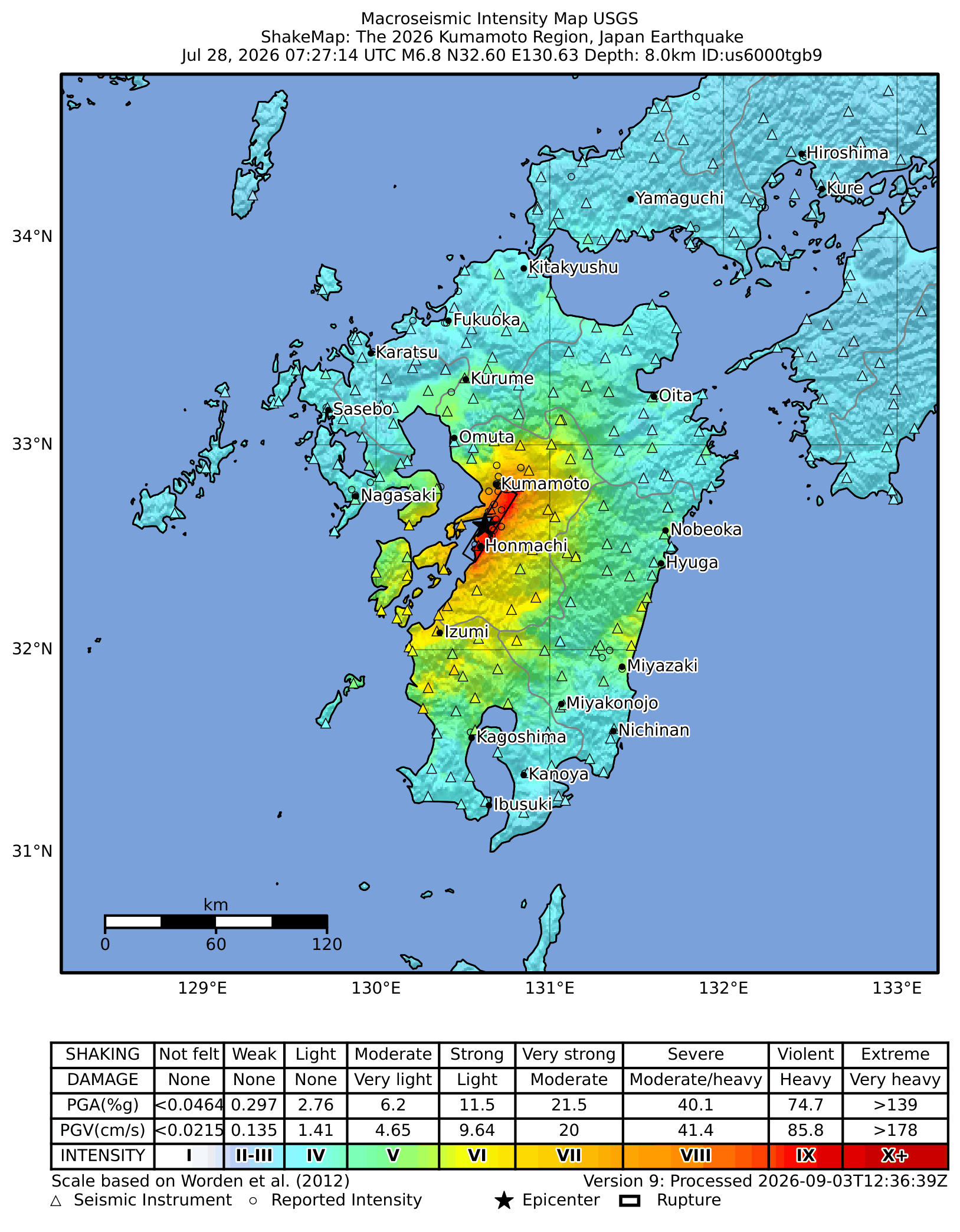
USGS ShakeMap

The earthquake occurred at 16:27 JST (07:27 UTC) on 28 July in Kumamoto Prefecture, Japan. According to the Japan Meteorological Agency (JMA), the earthquake had a magnitude of M_{JMA} 7.1. The United States Geological Survey (USGS) recorded an earthquake of M_{ww} 6.8 with an epicenter 3 km (1.9 mi) west-southwest of the city of Uki. It was caused by strike‑slip faulting. The USGS focal mechanism solution suggested coseismic slip occurred on either a northwest-trending left‑lateral fault or a northeast-trending right‑lateral fault.

=== Geology ===
Kumamoto Prefecture is located on Kyushu, the most southerly of Japan's four main islands. It lies at the southern end of the Japan Median Tectonic Line, Japan's longest, where a system of active faults forks in two directions at the Beppu-Haneyama fault zone. Earthquakes occur along the Beppu–Shimabara graben, with epicenters moving from west to east over time. To the southeast of Kumamoto, the continuation of the Japan Median Tectonic Line is the major southwest–northeast trending strike-slip Futagawa-Hinagu fault zone system, consisting of the Futugawa fault to the north and the Hinagu fault to the south, parts of which ruptured during the 2016 Kumamoto earthquakes.

The Hinagu fault is 80 km (50 mi) long and can be divided into three segments; Takano-Shiraha, Hinagu and Yatsushiro. According to Shinji Tōda, a scientist at Tohoku University, the earthquake was caused by slip on a section of the northeastern Hinagu segment. Tōda added that while the rupture relieved seismic strain on that segment, it loaded additional strain on adjacent ones. The Takano-Shirahata segment was previously involved in the 2016 Kumamoto earthquakes, hence the likelihood of another rupture on this segment remained low. However, the Yatsushiro and southwestern Hinagu segments which lie further south and also in the Yatsushiro Sea have a greater probability of rupturing, capable of producing a M_{JMA} 7.3 event and tsunami.

Similarly, the 2016 earthquakes which occurred on the northern segment of the Hinagu fault likely increased stress on its southern segments. The 2016 earthquakes caused 0.6 m (2 ft 0 in) of slip on the northern Hinagu fault while during the 2026 earthquake, it produced 0.2 m (7.9 in) slip. Prior to 2026, the Hinagu fault was identified as a potential source of large earthquakes. A national seismic hazard assessment report published in January 2026 identified the Hinagu segment as having a 6% probability of rupturing within the next 30 years; the greatest probability among all faults in the country.

The USGS modelled an earthquake with slip across a 45 km (28 mi) long northeast-trending fault, extending down to 20 km (12 mi) depth. According to the model, the rupture propagated bilaterally, extending northeast and southwest from the epicenter and was completed in about 18 seconds. Slip extended about 10 km (6.2 mi) northeast of the epicenter and 35 km (22 mi) southwest, although most was confined to a 20 by 15 km (12.4 by 9.3 mi) area on the fault plane immediately southwest of the epicenter. A maximum slip of 2.40 m (7 ft 10 in) was inferred at a depth of about 5 km (3.1 mi) in this region of large slip beneath Uki. Towards the surface, the displacement was limited, ranging from negligible to about 0.1 m (3.9 in) along most of its length while peaking at 1.37 m (4 ft 6 in) at the shallowest portion of the main slip patch.

=== Seismic intensity ===
A maximum intensity of 7 on the Japan Meteorological Agency seismic intensity scale was recorded in Uki and Hikawa, the highest on the scale. Intensity 6+ was recorded in Minami-ku, Yatsushiro, Uto, Misato, and Mashiki. Aftershocks up to intensity 5- on the JMA seismic intensity scale were also felt. According to the USGS, a seismic station in Mashiki recorded a peak ground acceleration of 0.705 g, while another station in Yatsushiro recorded a peak ground velocity of 94.26 cm (3.093 ft)/s. Japan's strong-motion seismograph network recorded a peak acceleration value of about 1.7 g. The Japan Meteorological Agency and Earthquake Research Headquarters said it recorded a peak ground acceleration of 2,437 gal (2.49 g) in Toyono, Uki; this value exceeds the maximum recorded acceleration of 1,791 gal during the 2016 earthquake.

Tremors were also felt in parts of South Korea, with more than 789 reports of the tremor being received, including 291 in Busan alone. The Korea Meteorological Administration reported a Modified Mercalli intensity of III (Weak) in Busan, South Gyeongsang Province, South Jeolla Province, Gwangju, and Jeju Province. Intensity II (Weak) was observed in Gangwon, Gyeonggi, North Gyeongsang Province, Daegu, Ulsan, North Jeolla Province, South Chungcheong Province, and North Chungcheong Province. In China, residents in Shanghai said they felt tremors, while multiple people in Ningbo and Suzhou reported feeling disoriented.

Locations with a seismic intensity of Shindo 5− and higher
Intensity	Prefecture	Locations
7	Kumamoto	Uki, Hikawa
6+	Kumamoto	Kumamoto City (Minami-ku), Yatsushiro, Uto, Misato, Mashiki
6−	Kumamoto	Koshi, Ōzu, Nishihara, Mifune, Kamiamakusa, Ashikita
5+	Kumamoto	Kumamoto City (Chūō, Higashi, Nishi, Kita), Yamaga, Kikuchi, Kikuyō, Minamata, Amakusa, Tsunagi
5+	Nagasaki	Minamishimabara
5+	Kagoshima	Satsumasendai, Satsuma, Nagashima
5−	Kumamoto	Tamana, Nagomi, Yamato, Reihoku, Aso, Takamori, Minamiaso, Hitoyoshi, Taragi, Yunomae, Yamae, Asagiri
5−	Nagasaki	Unzen, Isahaya
5−	Kagoshima	Akune, Izumi, Ichikikushikino, Isa, Yusui
5−	Saga	Kanzaki, Shiroishi
5−	Fukuoka	Yanagawa, Okawa
5−	Miyazaki	Nobeoka, Saito, Shiiba

=== Long-period ground motion ===
The JMA also reported that the Kumamoto Region of Kumamoto Prefecture registered the highest possible Long-Period Ground Motion (LPGM) intensity of 4.

Locations with LPGM Class of II or higher observed
Class	Prefecture	Locations
IV	Kumamoto	Kumamoto Region
III	Kumamoto	Amakusa and Ashikita
II	Kumamoto	Aso Region, Kuma Region
II	Oita	Western Oita
II	Miyazaki	Southern Miyazaki Mountains, Northern Miyazaki Plains
II	Kagoshima	Satsuma Region
II	Saga	Southern Saga

=== Aftershocks ===
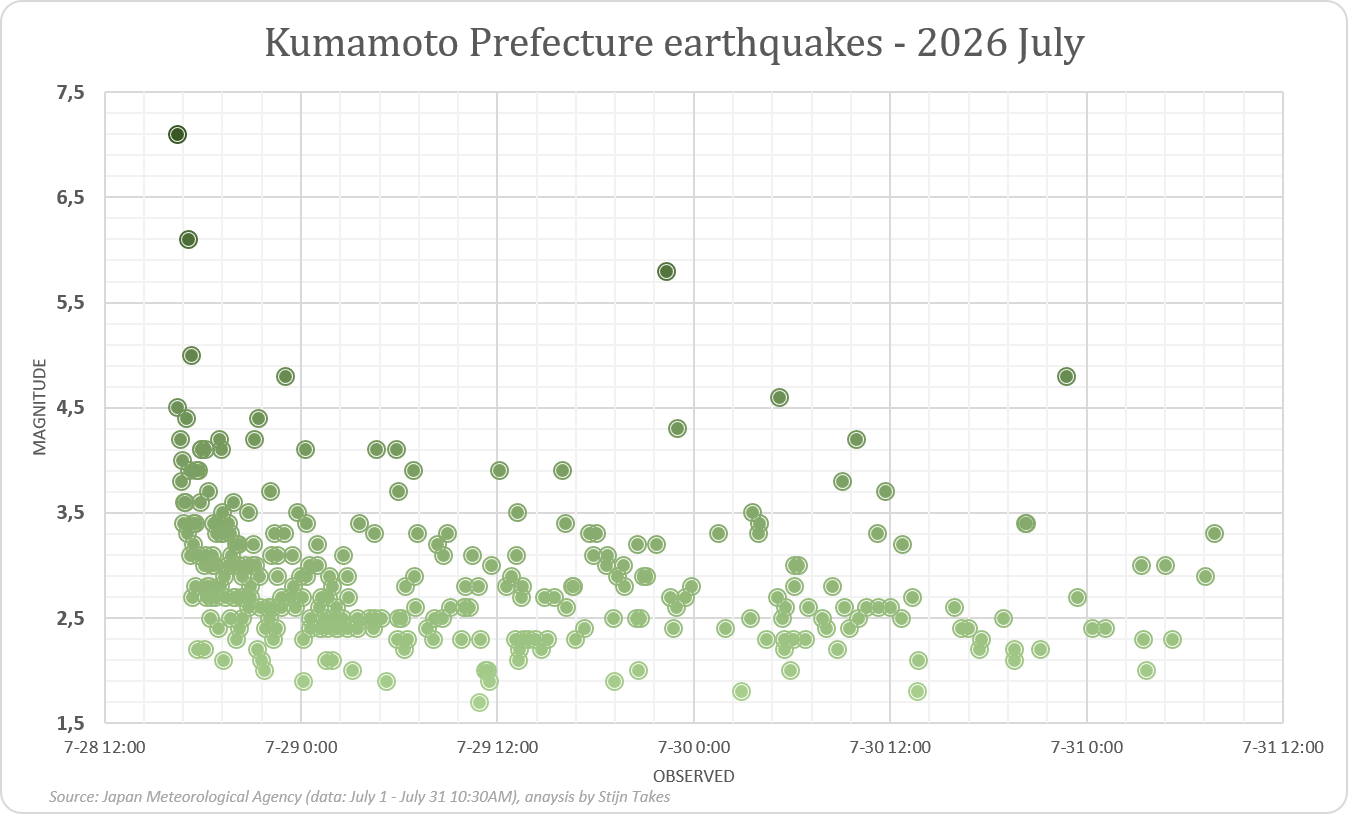
Scatter plot showing earthquake magnitude versus occurrence time for earthquakes observed in Kumamoto Prefecture, Japan, between 28 July 2026 and 31 July 2026

At least 390 aftershocks were recorded following the earthquake. The JMA warned of the possible occurrence of earthquakes with a maximum seismic intensity of 7 for the next two to three days following the initial tremor.

A list of major earthquakes that occurred in the vicinity of the epicenter following the mainshock (including the mainshock itself).

Date and time of occurrence (JST)	Epicenter	Depth of the earthquake's hypocenter	Magnitude	Maximum seismic intensity	Maximum class of long-period ground motion	Ref.
16:27, July 28, 2026	Kumamoto Region, Kumamoto Prefecture	16 km	M 7.1	7	IV	
16:29, July 28, 2026	Kumamoto Region, Kumamoto Prefecture	Very shallow	M 4.5	5−	II	
17:08, July 28, 2026	Amakusa and Ashikita regions, Kumamoto Prefecture	Very shallow	M 6.1	5−	II	
19:03, July 28, 2026	Kumamoto Region, Kumamoto Prefecture	10 km	M 4.2	5−	No observations	
22:19, July 29, 2026	Amakusa and Ashikita regions, Kumamoto Prefecture	Very shallow	M 5.8	5−	I	
21:47, August 1, 2026	Kumamoto Region, Kumamoto Prefecture	10 km	M 4.7	5−	No observations	

=== Ground effects ===
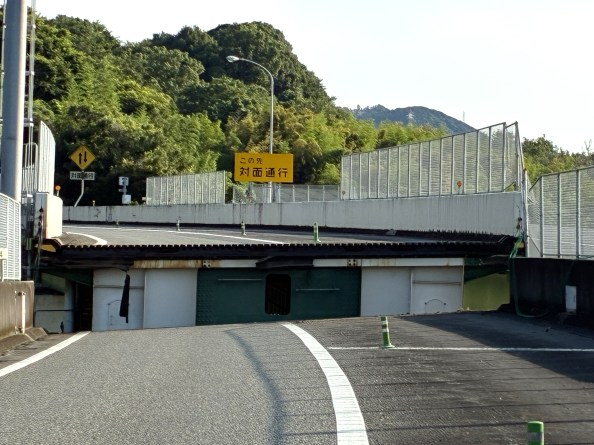
A road surface gap at the Myoken Daiichi Bridge on the Minamikyushu Expressway, caused by ground displacement along the Hinagu Fault

Ground deformation was reported by the Geospatial Information Authority of Japan. In Yatsushiro, the Sencho geographic reference point was displaced 0.84 m (2 ft 9 in) northeast, and the Izumi station recorded a 0.17 m (6.7 in) shift southward. In Kumamoto, the Jonan station recorded 0.4 m (1 ft 4 in) of displacement to the north. Surface ruptures were also reported on the ground surface caused by fault slip. The earthquake also caused soil liquefaction in Kumamoto, where the ground is characterised by loose sediment and a shallow water table. It caused roads to twist and tilted homes.

Slip towards the ground surface along the Hinagu Fault caused ruptures that damaged overlying infrastructure such as roads, bridges, and buildings. Satellite imagery analysis by NHK revealed 10 km (6.2 mi) of visible surface rupturing between Hikawa and Yatsushiro. Geologist Shinji Toda from Tohoku University said these ruptures only represented where the rupture breached the surface; for a significant portion of its length, the rupture did not reach the surface. An inference of crustal deformation data suggests a rupture length closer to 30 km (19 mi). At Takaki, Mifune, surface ruptures were also reported after the 2016 earthquakes. In Ogawa, Uki, fault slip caused vertical ground displacement through an urbanized area. A surface rupture propagated under a viaduct near the junction of the Kyushu Expressway and Minamikyushu Expressways, breaking along a column and causing one side to drop vertically. At a parking lot in Mifune, the ground shifted laterally to the right by 0.2 m (7.9 in) and caused a bulge.

== Impact ==
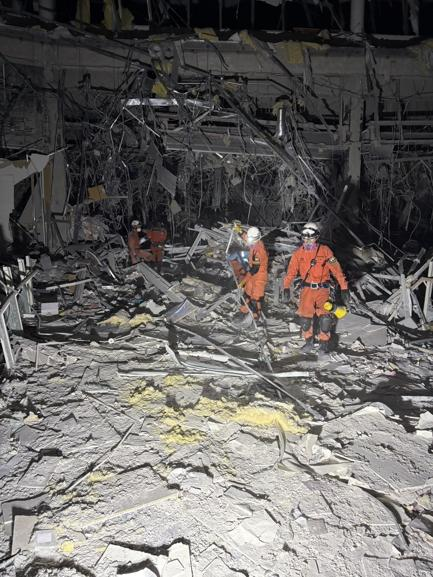
Rescuers searching the rubble of the partially collapsed Aeon Mall Kumamoto in Kashima

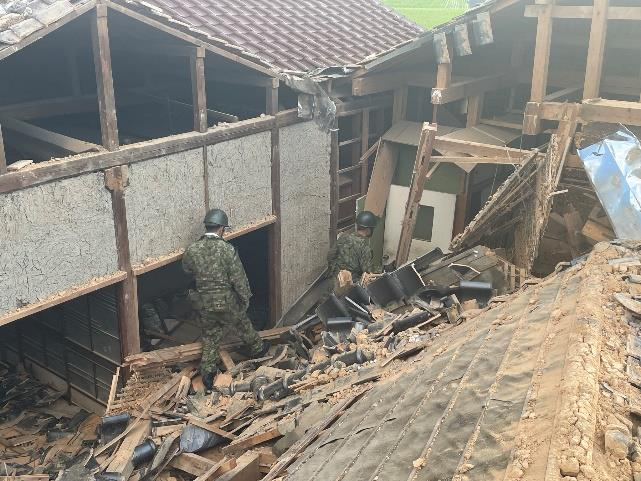
Japan Self-Defense Forces (JSDF) personnel inspecting a collapsed house

Officials from Kumamoto Prefecture said that 38 deaths were recorded. Some deaths were indirect such as the case of a woman found inside a car on 30 July who died in her sleep from heat stroke which authorities said was disaster-related. Among the dead were 20 in Yatsushiro, 7 in Kashima, 5 in Hikawa, 3 in Uki and 1 in Kōsa. A total of 358 people were injured; 364 in Kumamoto, two in Fukuoka, and one each in Kagoshima and Ōita prefectures. At least 34 of those injured were in serious condition. Across Kyushu, 31,951 homes sustained damage, including 1,449 which collapsed and 1,185 which were partially destroyed. Around 10,000 people were displaced. Economic losses from damage to housing and infrastructure amounted to 1.094 trillion yen (US$6.86 billion), while commercial and industrial businesses sustained losses of 117.6 billion yen (US$738.2 million).

An estimated 3,000 shoppers were inside the Aeon Mall Kumamoto in Kashima when the second floor collapsed, followed by an explosion. Rescuers retrieved seven bodies and five survivors from the wreckage. A person inside a pub 300 m (980 ft) from the mall said he heard an explosion after the earthquake and saw a large cloud of smoke rising above the building. About 55 people were injured in the blast. The cause of the explosion was not known, although a government official told the press that there were reports of a gas leak. The industry ministry later said that the explosion was likely caused by liquefied petroleum gas used by the mall's restaurants for cooking and heating water following an on-site investigation. The earthquake prompted an evacuation of the shoppers; after that, some employees of the mall returned inside and were later caught in the blast. Two of the dead were employees of the variety store chain Habita who had initially evacuated following the earthquake but were ordered by the sales manager to return and transfer money stored in the cash register to a safe. The company subsequently apologized over the incident.

In Yatsushiro, the chimney of a factory owned by Nippon Paper Industries collapsed, killing nine people and injuring two. Another person was killed by a collapsed house in the city. The worship hall of the 19th-century Yatsushiro-gū shrine and a section of a bridge also collapsed and fires were reported in the city and in Matsubase. Two residents and a staff member at a nursing home in Hikawa were injured by a collapsed wall. One Vietnamese national died after a crane collapsed on him in Kōsa, and another was injured after a wall collapsed.

At least 179 homes collapsed, and 1,269 others were damaged. All of the damaged houses were in Kumamoto Prefecture, with the exception of eight partially damaged houses in Fukuoka Prefecture. In Hikawa, at least 125 homes and buildings collapsed, and 754 others were damaged. In Uki, parts of the ceiling at Aeon Mall Uki also collapsed, and one person was found dead under a collapsed wall. Five people were initially trapped after two houses collapsed in the city. According to JR Kyushu, a freight train derailed near Yatsushiro Station. At least 12 people sustained arm or leg bruises inside a Kyushu Shinkansen train near Shin-Yatsushiro Station. The agency said there were more than 200 reports of snapped rails and collapsed sound barriers, but no Shinkansen trains derailed. Bent rails were reported at a train depot in Kumamoto and between Matsubase and Ogawa stations on the Kagoshima Main Line.

Landslides were reported on the slopes of Mount Mayuyama facing Shimabara, Nagasaki. At nearby Mount Unzen, the earthquake caused a partial collapse of its lava dome. Authorities responded by saying that there was no indication of a future large-scale collapse at either mountain.

Around 48,300 households in Kumamoto Prefecture lost power. About 30 branches of 7-Eleven lost electricity in the affected areas. Up to 84,000 households were left without water in Kumamoto and Nagasaki prefectures.

Kumamoto Castle, already extensively damaged by the 2016 Kumamoto earthquakes, was reported to have sustained further damage, with stone walls collapsing at some 40 locations. At the time of the earthquake, it was undergoing restoration work expected to be completed in 2052. The walls of several buildings collapsed in Saga Prefecture. A high school student was injured by falling debris at the city hall of Yame, Fukuoka Prefecture. Another person was injured in Ōita Prefecture.

== Response ==
A tsunami advisory for waves of 1 m (3 ft 3 in) was issued by the JMA for the coastlines of the Ariake and Yatsushiro seas. However, no tsunami waves were recorded before the advisory was cancelled shortly after.

Japanese prime minister Sanae Takaichi said more than 4,600 Japan Self-Defense Forces (SDF) personnel and 480 police officers from 11 prefectures had been deployed to help with rescue efforts, including 170 soldiers deployed at the collapsed Aeon mall. Takaichi later visited Kumamoto on 3 August, where she conducted an aerial inspection of the damage and met with evacuees in Hikawa. Authorities also issued advice on heat stroke in the area as temperatures reached 35 °C (95 °F). Defence Minister Shinjirō Koizumi said about 300 air conditioning units would be sent to the worst-hit areas. The Japanese government approved the release of more than 24 billion yen ($153 million) from its contingency fund to help communities affected by the earthquake. It later released an additional 147.8 billion yen ($927 million) in reserve funds from the fiscal 2026 budget. Around 1,293 volunteers also went to Kumamoto Prefecture to assist in relief operations.

Some 230 members of the Hyogo Prefectural Police began a thorough search of Aeon Mall, where an explosion occurred, to look for possible people still trapped on 31 July. The Kumamoto Prefectural Police said on 30 July that all known individuals trapped in the building had been rescued dead or alive. These operations ended on 1 August after they determined that no persons were in the building. Twenty-five cats were also rescued from a cat cafe at the mall. The Kagoshima Prefecture Emergency Fire Rescue Team and Kumamoto Prefectural Police conducted search and rescue operations at the Nippon Paper Industries; all 11 people trapped were recovered by 31 July. Rescue operations also occurred in Yatsushiro, where 32 homes collapsed, to find 4 missing people. The Japan Coast Guard deployed two vessels to provide water-related services in Uki and Yatsushiro.

Search and rescue were hampered by a heatwave which has raised air temperatures in the prefecture to 40 °C (104 °F). Officials instructed those participating in rescue and cleanup efforts to take breaks. The extreme heat also prompted the SDF to airlift air coolers for 400 evacuation centers where some 15,000 were taking refuge. The earthquake also disrupted water supply to 58,000 homes, prompting authorities to take measures. Warnings were issued for temperatures potentially reaching 40 °C (104 °F) over the weekend. In Yatsushiro, mobile toilets were installed over manholes, while SDF trucks carried water tanks into schools and community centres supplied by emergency reservoirs beneath city hall. Each resident was also limited to a supply of 3 litres (100 US fl oz). Disabled gas stations also further worsened the condition by making deliveries difficult. Some displaced people who decided to live in their cars also experienced difficulties in maintaining their air conditioning due to the fuel shortage.

Some transport lines were disrupted. Several sections of the Kyushu Expressway, Minamikyushu Expressway, Kyushu Chūō Expressway and Miyazaki Expressway were closed to traffic. The runway at Kumamoto Airport was closed for inspections on 28 July and was declared safe at 19:00 JST. All domestic flights to and from the airport on the day were cancelled. Operations gradually resumed the following day for international flights, but some domestic flights remained cancelled.

JR Kyushu suspended services on all of its rail lines, including the Kyushu Shinkansen and local trains. The Minamiaso Railway and Kumamoto Electric Railway also suspended service on their lines. The Kyushu Shinkansen resumed operations between Hakata and Chikugo-Funagoya in Fukuoka Prefecture after 18:00 JST on 29 July. Trains resumed operating between Chikugo-Funagoya and Kumamoto on the morning of 31 July, while services between Kumamoto and Kagoshima-Chuo remained closed. JR Kyushu said that due to heavy railroad damage, services between Kumamoto and Shin-Minamata stations of the Kyushu Shinkansen is unlikely to reopen in August. Similarly, on the Kagoshima Main Line, extensive equipment damage between Uto and Yatsushiro also made an August reopening difficult.

Kyushu Electric Power reported no abnormalities at the Sendai and Genkai nuclear power plants in adjacent prefectures. While the earthquake disrupted power to thousands of homes, it was fully restored by 31 July.

Several industries also shut down following the earthquake and subsequent logistical issues. Sony indefinitely halted operations at its semiconductor plant in Kikuyo, as did Renesas Electronics and Tokyo Electron at their facilities in Kumamoto Prefecture. Toyota suspended operations at three plants in Fukuoka Prefecture from 29 to 31 July, citing logistical issues and conditions at suppliers. Honda also halted operations at its factory in Ozu until 31 July, while Nissan partially suspended operations at two plants in Fukuoka Prefecture from 30 July due to delays in parts supplies. Japan Post Holdings suspended services at post offices across Kumamoto Prefecture. Yamato Transport also suspended package handling, while Sagawa Express suspended parcel collection and delivery services in some areas.

As part of a fundraising campaign, the Japan Sumo Association announced a donation of 10 million yen to support reconstruction efforts in Kumamoto Prefecture following the earthquake, with a portion of the funds having been raised through public donations during the September sumo tournament in Tokyo.

== International response ==
Taiwanese president Lai Ching-te sent a message of condolences and announced that preparations for assistance were underway. The Taiwanese government set up a bank account aimed at collecting donations for the earthquake for the month of August, raising more than NT$300 million ($9.4 million). The Ministry of Foreign Affairs announced that they will send NT$5 million to support aid and reconstruction in the affected areas. The city of Kaohsiung donated essential care supplies to a nursing home in Yatsushiro.

United States Forces Japan airlifted 16 tons of drinking water from Yokota Air Base in Tokyo to the JSDF Vice-Camp Takayubaru in Kumamoto Prefecture, where it was transported by the JSDF to storage sites serving affected residents.

== See also ==
- 1889 Kumamoto earthquake – 6.3 Magnitude Earthquake in Japan
- List of earthquakes in 2026
- List of earthquakes in Japan
