= 2016 Kumamoto earthquakes =

7.0 Magnitude Earthquake in Japan

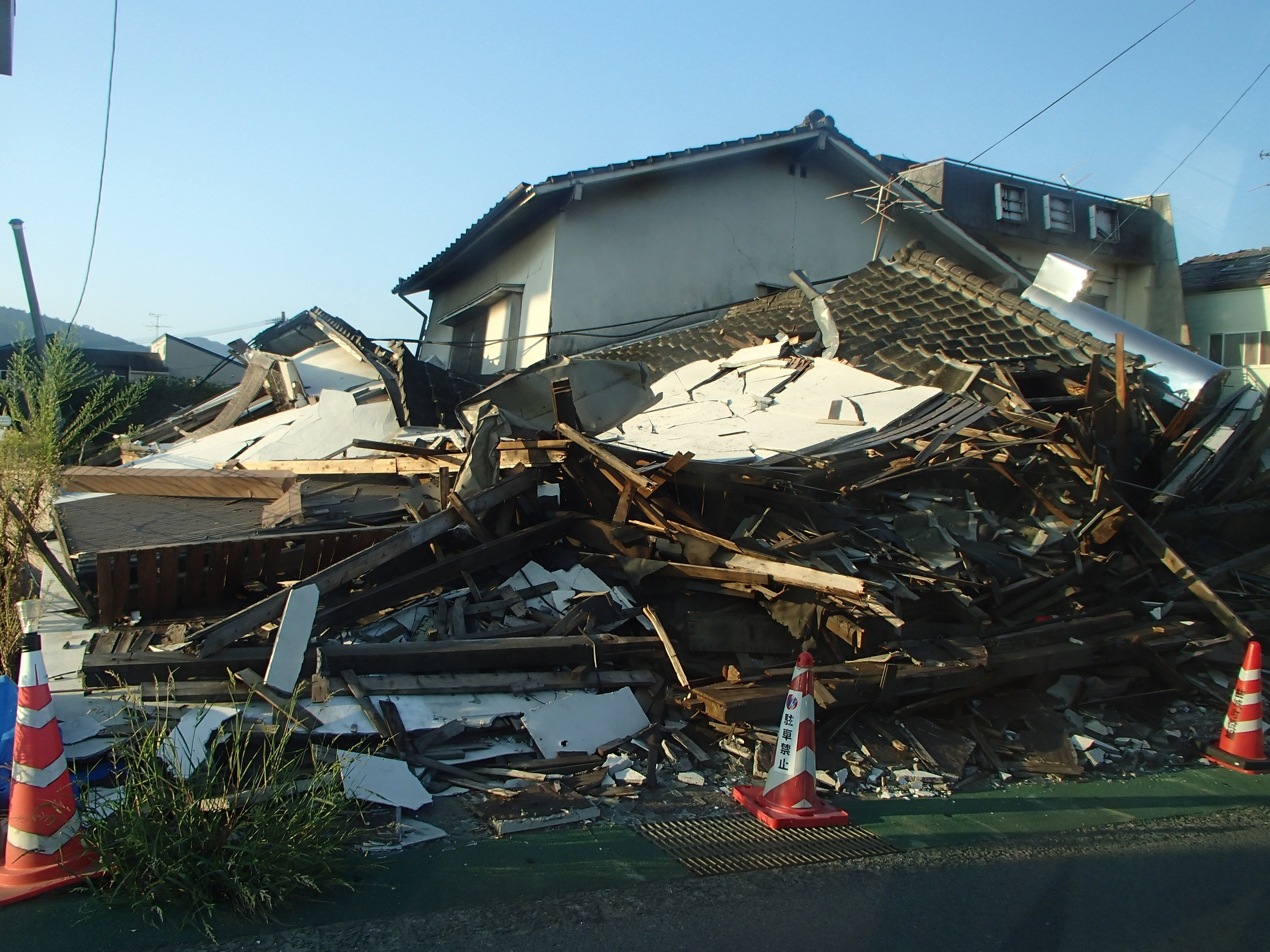
- A destroyed house in Kumamoto

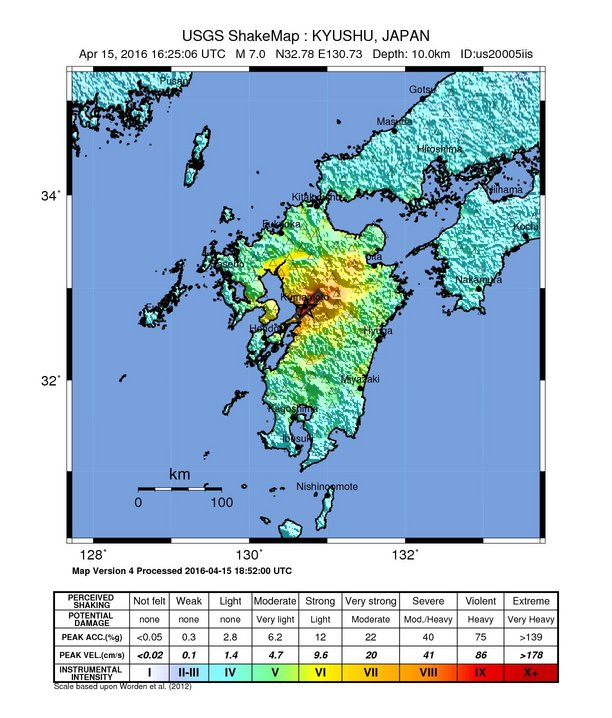
- United States Geological Survey shake map for the April 16 earthquake; a maximum Mercalli intensity scale value of 8.8 was observed just east of Kumamoto City.

- Location within Japan
- UTC time: 2016-04-15 16:25:06
- ISC event: 610289055
- USGS-ANSS: ComCat
- Local date: April 16, 2016
- Local time: 01:25 JST (UTC+9)
- Magnitude: 7.0 M_{w} 7.3 M_{JMA}
- Depth: 10 km
- Epicenter: 32°46′55.2″N 130°43′33.6″E
- Fault: Futagawa-Hinagu fault zone
- Type: Strike-slip
- Areas affected: Kumamoto Prefecture, Kyushu, Japan
- Max. intensity: JMA 7 (MMI IX)
- Peak acceleration: 1.61 g (foreshock); 1580 Gal (foreshock); 1.83 g (mainshock); 1791 Gal (mainshock)
- Foreshocks: 6.2 M_{w}, April 14, 2016; 12:26:36 (UTC), 21:26:36 (JST)
- Casualties: 277 dead, 2,809 injured (including indirect deaths)

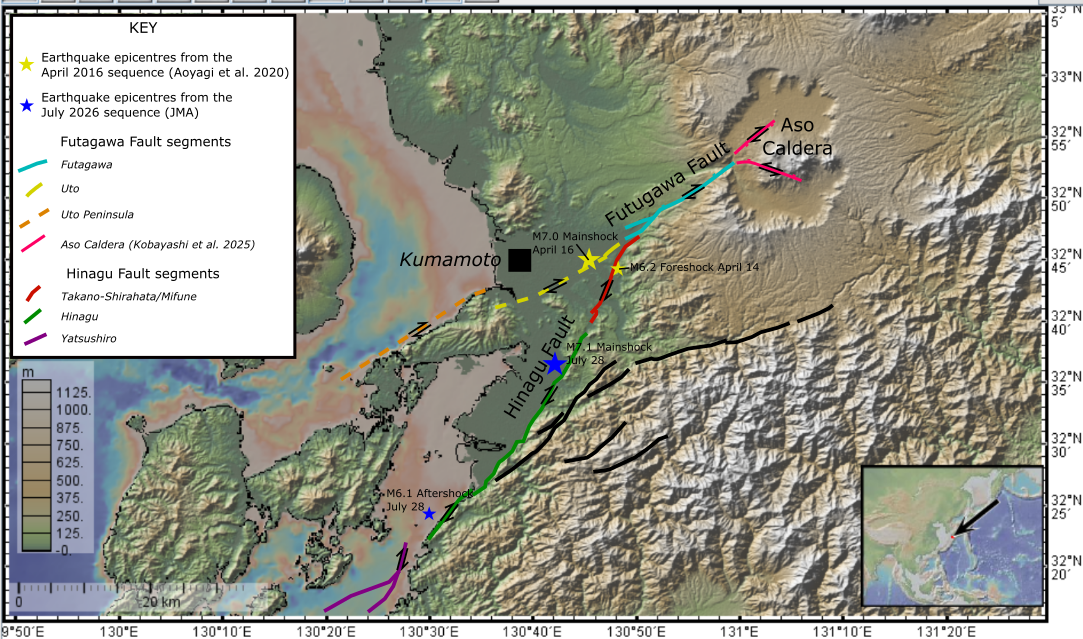
Map of the Futagawa-Hinagu fault zone, showing locations of largest foreshock and the mainshock

The 2016 Kumamoto earthquakes (Japanese: 平成28年熊本地震, Hepburn: Heisei 28-nen Kumamoto jishin) were a series of earthquakes, including a magnitude 7.0 mainshock which struck at 01:25 JST on April 16, 2016 (16:25 UTC on April 15) beneath Kumamoto City of Kumamoto Prefecture in Kyushu Region, Japan, at a depth of about 10 kilometres (6.2 miles), and a foreshock earthquake with a magnitude 6.2 at 21:26 JST (12:26 UTC) on April 14, 2016, at a depth of about 11 kilometres (6.8 miles).

In total, the two earthquakes killed 277 people and injured 2,809 others, a majority of them indirectly, This earthquake sequence was the deadliest in Japan since the 2011 Tōhoku earthquake and tsunami, until the 2024 Noto earthquake. Of these, 50 deaths were directly caused by the earthquake, 218 were disaster-related deaths (災害関連死, Saigai-kanren-shi) caused by aggravation of injuries from the earthquake or aggravation of illnesses during evacuation, and 5 of the deaths caused by the heavy rains from June 19–25 were related to the earthquake.

Severe damage occurred in Kumamoto and Ōita Prefectures, with numerous structures collapsing and catching fire. More than 44,000 people were evacuated from their homes due to the disaster.

== Tectonic setting ==
Kumamoto Prefecture lies at the southern end of the Japan Median Tectonic Line, Japan's longest, where a system of active faults forks in two directions at the Beppu-Haneyama Fault Zone. Specifically, the series of quakes ruptured the 81-km-long Hinagu Fault and 64-km-long Futagawa Fault to its north, as well as lesser but discernable interaction with the farther flung Beppu-Haneyama Fault Zone. A 27-km section of the Futagawa Fault Zone slid 3.5 meters. The earthquakes are occurring along the Beppu–Shimabara graben, with epicentres moving from west to east over time.

Around 08:30 local time on April 16, Mount Aso saw a small-scale eruption with ash billowing 100 m (330 ft) into the air; the eruption was not related to the earthquake. Mount Aso had already been active since before the earthquakes, being under a Level 2 warning from the JMA since November 24, 2015.

== Earthquakes ==
=== April 14 foreshock ===
Magnitude of earthquakes

Although the focus of the foreshock earthquake was 12.0 kilometres (7.5 miles) beneath Mount Kinpo to the north-northwest of Kumamoto's city center, the worst-hit area was in the eastern Kumamoto suburb of Mashiki, where the foreshock earthquake's victims perished. The earthquake was strongly felt as far north as Shimonoseki on southwestern Honshu, and as far south as the Kirishima in Kagoshima Prefecture. In the following hours, there were at least 11 aftershocks of at least 4.5 magnitude, one of which was a magnitude 6; more than 140 aftershocks were registered within two days. It was the first earthquake to register as a 7 on the Japan Meteorological Agency seismic intensity scale on Kyushu, and the first one in the country since 2011. On April 15, the JMA officially labelled it Heisei 28-nen Kumamoto jishin (平成28年熊本地震, "Heisei 28 Kumamoto Earthquake")–Heisei 28 being the year 2016 on the Japanese calendar.

Japan Meteorological Agency seismic intensity Shindo 6 Lower and higher
Intensity	Prefecture	Location
7	Kumamoto	Mashiki
6-	Kumamoto	Kumamoto (Higashi-ku, Nishi-ku, Minami-ku), Tamana, Uki, Nishihara

=== April 16 mainshock ===
At 01:25 JST on April 16 (16:25 UTC, April 15), a 7.0 magnitude earthquake, under Higashi Ward of Kumamoto City, occurred as the result of strike-slip faulting at shallow depth. Significant additional damage occurred in those areas of Kumamoto Prefecture recovering from the April 14 earthquake, with strong tremors and damage also recorded as far east as Beppu in Ōita Prefecture. It was also felt as far away as Busan, South Korea, with an intensity of MMI III. Like the foreshock, this earthquake caused JMA seismic intensity 7 shaking. A tsunami advisory was issued at 01:27 JST for areas along the Ariake Sea and Yatsushiro Sea, with the wave height forecast at 0.2 to 1 m (0.7 to 3.3 ft), but was lifted less than an hour later at 02:14 JST.

Japan Meteorological Agency seismic intensity Shindo 6 Lower and higher
Intensity	Prefecture	Location
7	Kumamoto	Nishihara, Mashiki
6+	Kumamoto	Minamiaso, Kumamoto (Chūō-ku, Higashi-ku, Nishi-ku), Kikuchi, Uto, Uki, Koshi, Ozu, Kashima
6-	Kumamoto	Aso, Kumamoto (Minami-ku, Kita-ku), Yatsushiro, Tamana, Misato, Nagomi, Kikuyo, Mifune, Yamato, Hikawa, Kamiamakusa, Amakusa
6-	Oita	Beppu, Yufu

=== Aftershocks ===
The following is a list of major aftershocks that have occurred in Kumamoto Prefecture since April 14, 2016.

Japan Time	Magnitude	Intensity	Comment
2016-04-14 21:26	Mj6.5, Mw6.2	7	Foreshocks
2016-04-14 22:07	Mj5.8	6-	Foreshocks
2016-04-15 00:03	Mj6.4	6+	Foreshocks
2016-04-16 01:25	Mj7.3, Mw7.0	7	Mainshock
2016-04-16 01:45	Mj5.9	6-	Aftershocks
2016-04-16 03:03	Mj5.9	5+	Aftershocks
2016-04-16 03:55	Mj5.8	6+	Aftershocks
2016-04-18 20:41	Mj5.8	5+	Aftershocks
2016-04-19 17:52	Mj5.5	5+	Aftershocks

== Damage and casualties ==
=== April 14 foreshock ===
At least nine people died and 1,108 more were injured by the April 14 foreshock. The roof and exterior walls of Kumamoto Castle sustained damage. The castle's shachihoko were also destroyed. Service on the Kyushu Shinkansen was suspended after a train derailed. The foreshock displaced an estimated 44,000 people and collapsed at least 19 homes. Merchandise was knocked off shelves in stores. Fires broke out and landslides severely damaged roads.

=== April 16 mainshock ===
At least 277 people were killed and 2,809 others were injured by the mainshock, including many indirectly. Of these, 50 deaths were directly caused by the earthquake, 218 were disaster-related deaths (災害関連死, Saigai-kanren-shi) caused by aggravation of injuries from the earthquake or aggravation of illnesses during evacuation, and 5 of the deaths caused by the heavy rains from June 19–25 were related to the earthquake. Across Kumamoto Prefecture, 8,657 houses were completely destroyed, 34,491 were partially destroyed and 155,095 others, as well as 467 public buildings and 12,857 structures of unspecified use, were damaged, including 270 houses which were affected by flooding. Three people were killed and 34 others were injured in Oita Prefecture, where 10 houses collapsed, 222 were severely damaged and 8,110 others were partially damaged. In Fukuoka Prefecture, 17 people were injured and 255 houses were damaged, four of them severely, while 13 people were injured and one house was damaged in Saga Prefecture. Eight people were injured and 41 houses were damaged in Miyazaki Prefecture, two of them severely, with damage also recorded in Yamaguchi and Nagasaki Prefectures.

As a result of the mainshock, the entirety of Kumamoto city was left without water. All residents of Nishihara Village in Kumamoto Prefecture were evacuated over fears that a nearby dam could collapse. Kumamoto Airport was also closed to all but emergency flights, and service on the Kyushu Shinkansen was suspended after a train derailed due to the earthquake. Numerous structures collapsed or caught fire as a result of the earthquake. Government officials estimated more than 1,000 buildings had been seriously damaged, with 90 destroyed. A 500-bed hospital in Kumamoto City was knocked off its foundations, forcing the evacuation of all patients, and a natural gas leak prompted Saibu Gas to turn off supplies to multiple homes in the city.

Numerous landslides took place across the mountains of Kyushu, rendering roads impassable, The Great Aso Bridge of the Japan National Route 325 in Minamiaso collapsed into the Kurokawa river. A rockslide blocked the entirety of the four-lane expressway close to the fallen bridge, leaving a large scar that ran almost completely up the hill that suffered the rockslide.

The Aso Shrine was also heavily damaged in the earthquake. The shrine's rōmon (tower gate), officially classified as an Important Cultural Property by the Japanese government, and the haiden (worshiping hall) both completely collapsed. Kumamoto Castle, another Important Cultural Property sustained damage to its roof and exterior buildings and walls because of the earthquakes and associated aftershocks. Several of the castle's shachihoko ornaments were destroyed, and a large number of kawara tiles also fell from the roof. Other historical buildings such as Janes' Residence, the first western-style house built in Kumamoto (dating from 1871) were also totally destroyed. The former registered Cultural Asset was initially located in the grounds of Kumamoto Castle, but was later relocated near Suizen-ji Jōju-en.

Early estimates of the economic costs of the damage range from $5.5 billion to $7.5 billion, with insured property losses estimated to be between $800 million to $1.2 billion, according to Risk Management Solutions or between $1.7 billion to $2.9 billion, according to Guy Carpenter. Through the first half of 2016, about $3.2 billion of claims for damage to residential dwellings were paid out by insurance companies, according to data from the General Insurance Association of Japan.

== Aftermath ==
Kumamoto Prefectural Police received more than 300 calls, while Ōita Prefectural Police received more than 100 calls. More than 91,700 people were evacuated. An additional 15,000 soldiers from the Japan Self-Defense Forces joined relief efforts following the earthquake. By April 16, more than 44,000 people were evacuated from the hardest-hit areas. Prime Minister Shinzō Abe mobilized 3,000 personnel of the Japan Self-Defense Forces to assist local authorities with search and rescue and recovery efforts. By April 18, the number of people seeking shelter had risen to 180,000, while at least eight people remained missing in a landslide caused by the earthquake.

== Gallery ==
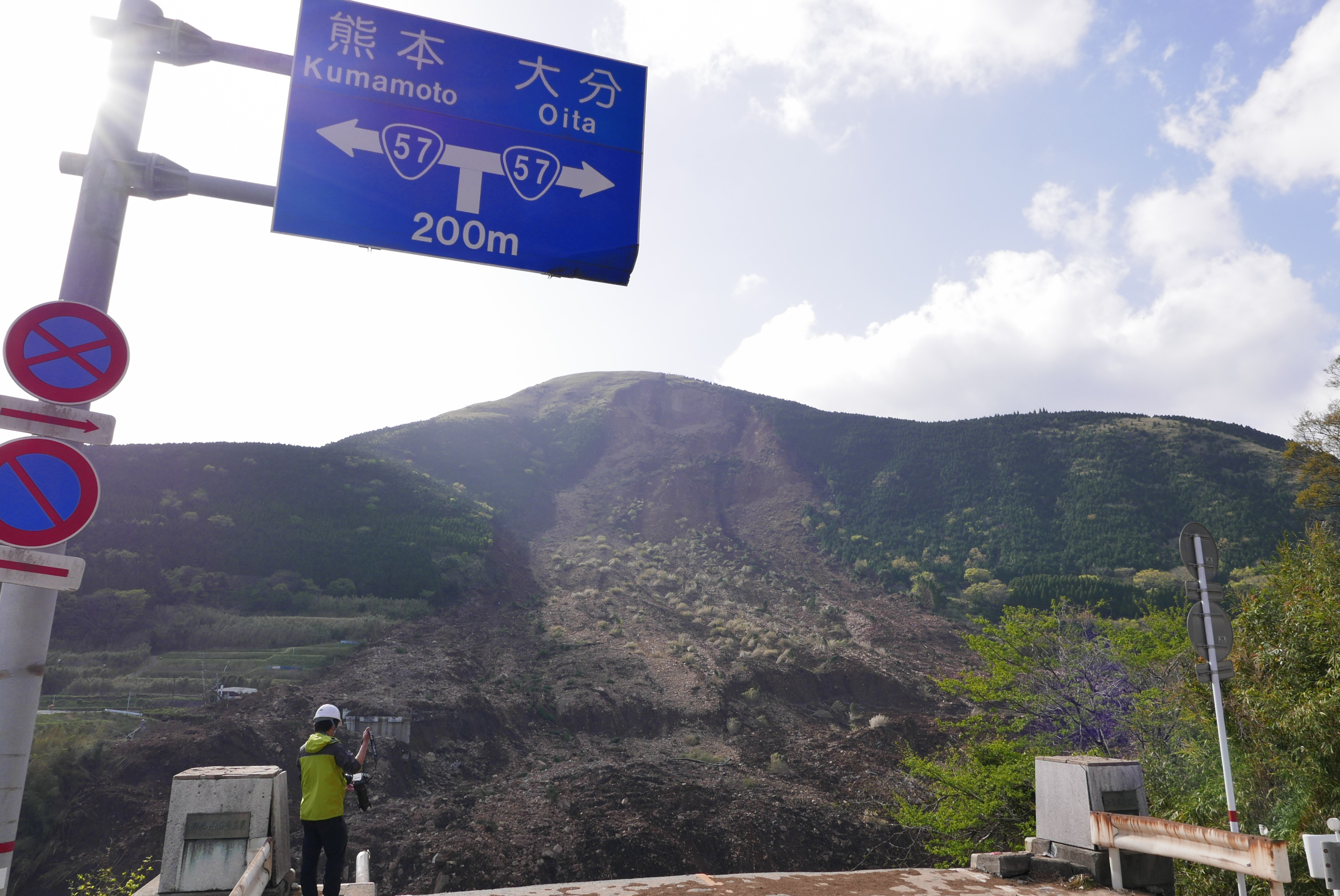
The Great Aso Bridge in Minamiaso collapsed into the Kurokawa River due to a landslide.

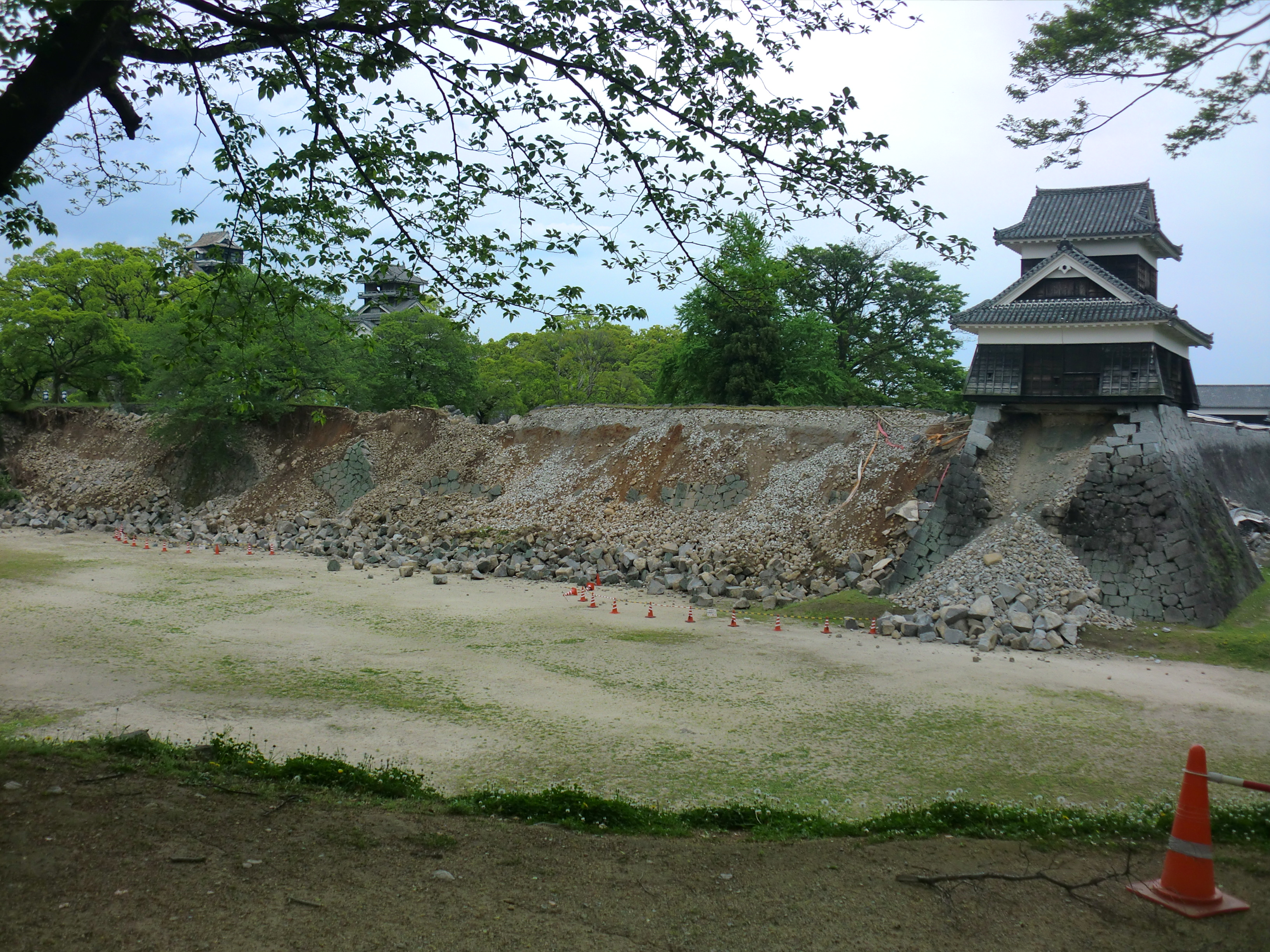
The north-west Inui Turret and wall of Kumamoto Castle

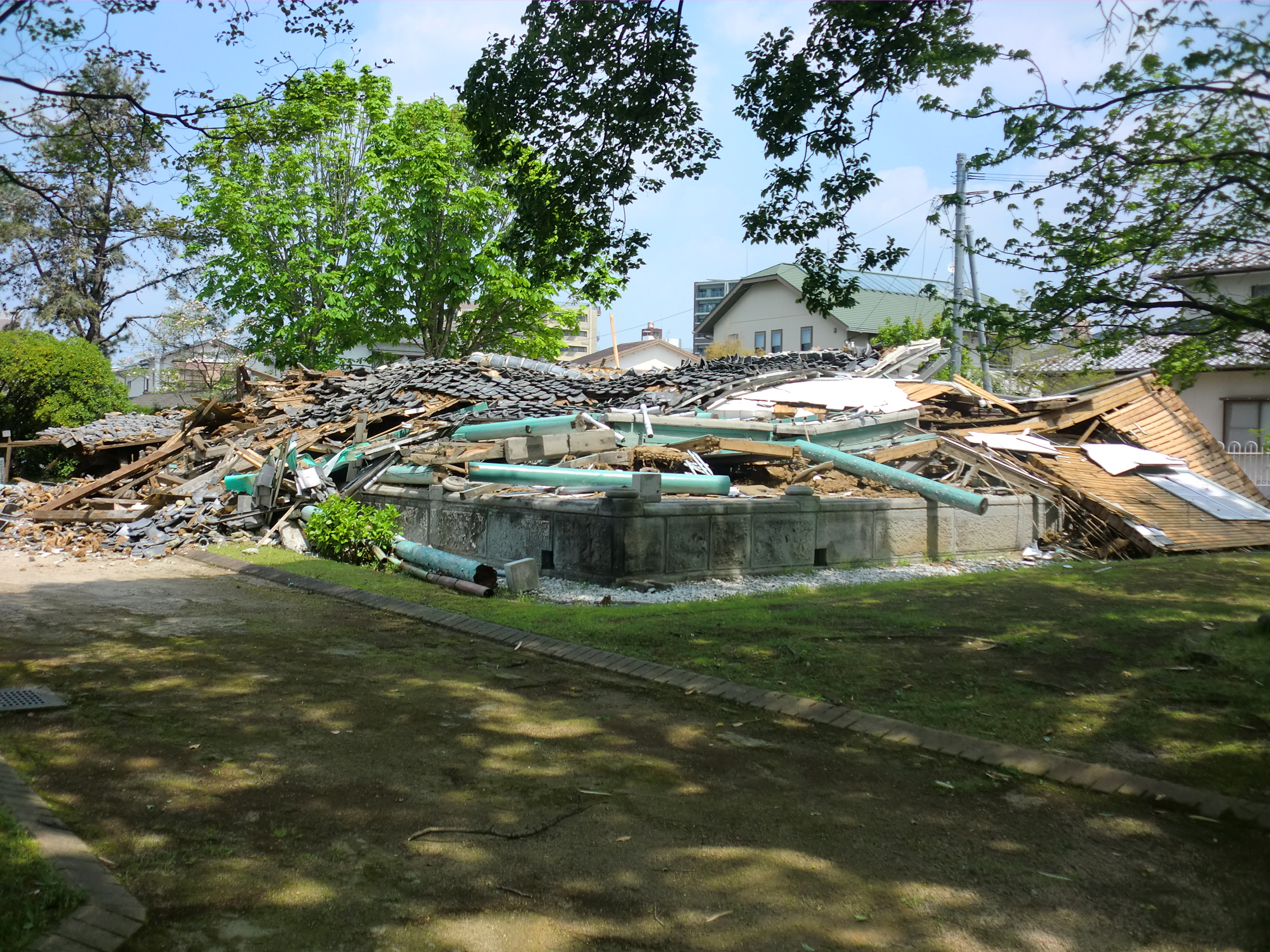
The ruins of the historic Janes' Residence

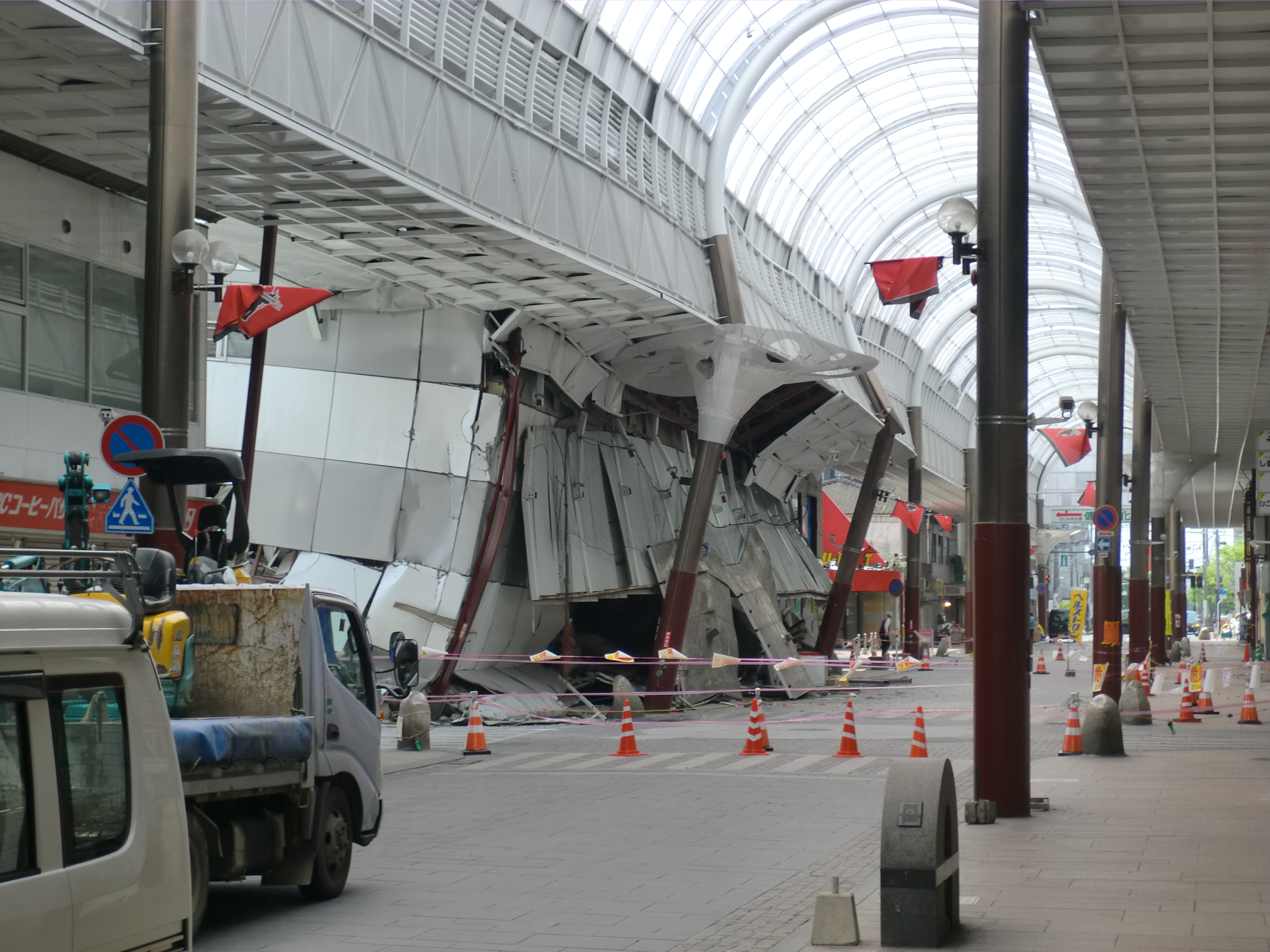
The damaged Sunlive Kengun in the pedestrian arcade in downtown Kumamoto

== See also ==
- 1889 Kumamoto earthquake
- 2026 Kumamoto earthquake
- List of earthquakes in 2016
- List of earthquakes in Japan
