= Futagawa-Hinagu fault zone =

Faults in Kumamoto Prefecture, Japan

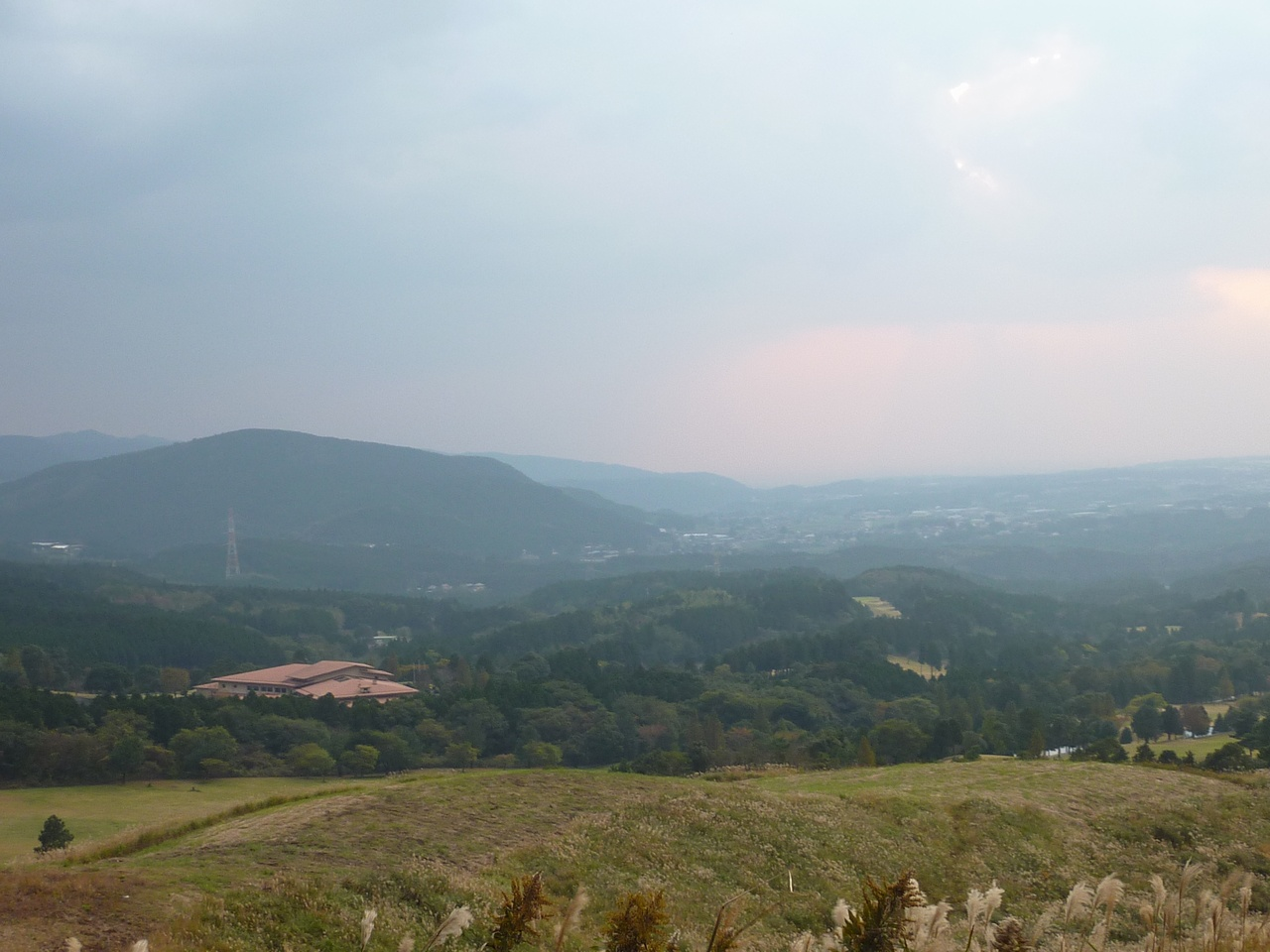
Nishihara village, located at the western foot of the Aso outer rim, is directly traversed by the Futagawa fault.

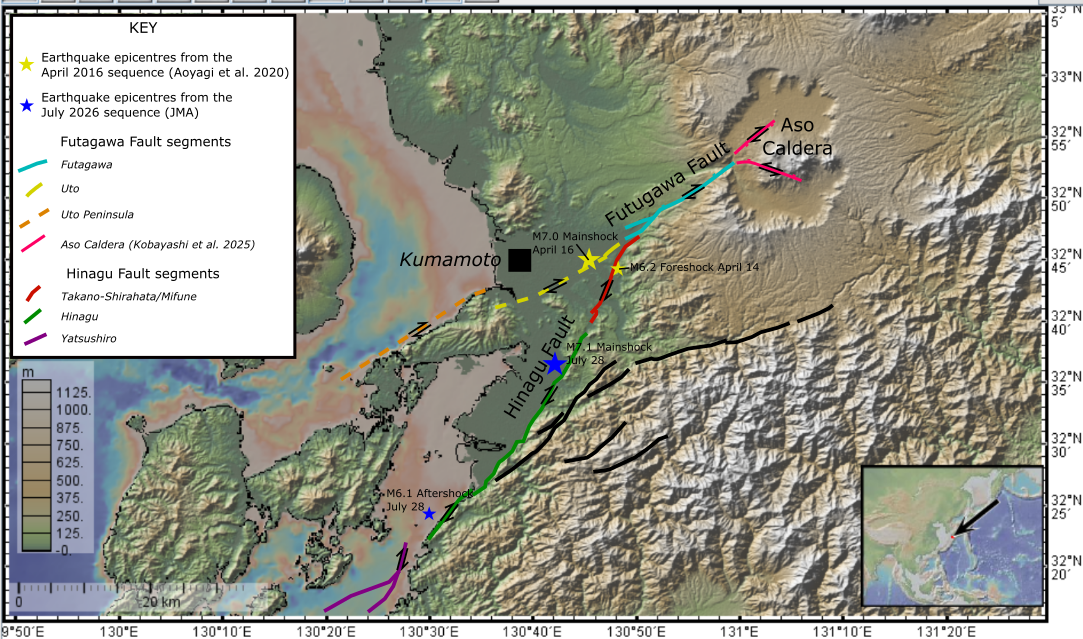
Map of the fault zone showing locations of largest earthquakes since 2000

The Futagawa-Hinagu fault zone (布田川・日奈久断層帯, Futagawa Hinagu Dansōtai) is a series of faults in Kumamoto Prefecture of Japan, which was responsible for the 2016 Kumamoto earthquakes. It consists of two fault zones along the west coast of Kumamoto that stretches over 100 km, making it the longest fault zone in Kyushu. Parts of the fault were selected as natural monuments following the 2016 earthquakes. 10 years later, a section of the fault ruptured as part of the 2026 Kumamoto earthquake, specifically the Hinagu segment to the southwest of the April 14 foreshock of the 2016 earthquake sequence.

== Tectonic setting ==
The tectonics of Kyushu, Shikoku and western Honshu are dominated by the effects of the ongoing convergence between the Eurasian plate and the Philippine Sea plate. The Philippine Sea plate is subducting beneath the Eurasian plate at a rate of 58 mm per year along the line of the Nankai Trough. The Japanese islands were formed from a series of island arcs, caused by this subduction. The direction of convergence is oblique to the convergent boundary and the displacement between the plates is partitioned into orthogonal shortening along the Nankai megathrust and right-lateral strike-slip along the Median Tectonic Line. The Futagawa-Hinagu fault zone is regarded as the continuation of this structure in western Kyushu. Kyushu is also affected by extensional tectonics, with active extension in a north-south direction, as demonstrated by the Beppu-Shimbara rift zone.

== Geometry ==
The fault system consists mainly of two linked right-lateral strike slip fault zones, the Futagawa and Hinagu fault zones.

=== Futagawa fault zone ===
The Futagawa fault zone extends from the Aso Caldera in the northeast to the western end of the Uto Peninsula, offshore in the Ariake Sea, to the southwest. Three main segments are described from northeast to southwest, the Futagawa, Uto and Uto Peninsula segments. This fault zone follows the northern edge of a pronounced bouguer gravity anomaly. An analysis of Synthetic-aperture radar (SAR) data following the 2016 Kumamoto earthquakes, using various types of interferometry, has identified further fault segments within the Aso Caldera, the two largest of which are a right-lateral structure parallel to the Futagawa segment and another northwest-southeast trending which has a left-lateral displacement. Both of these faults have significant normal faulting components down towards the center of the caldera and terminate within a low-density region interpreted as a hydrothermal field of lower stress levels and higher temperatures that may have inhibited further propagation. During the 2016 earthquake sequence, the segments inside the caldera and the whole of the Futagawa segment ruptured, plus the northeastern-most part of the Uto segment. Surface ruptures were also noted on the Idenokuchi Fault that runs parallel to and south of the Futagawa segment. Paleoseismological investigations on the Futagawa segment and the Idenokuchi Fault, have identified three earlier earthquakes on these fault segments since 7,300 BP, with an average recurrence interval of 2,000 to 3,000 years.

=== Hinagu fault zone ===
The Hinagu fault zone extends southwestwards for about 80 km from its junction with the Futagawa fault zone, near Kashima, to the southwestern end of the Yatsushiro Sea. Three main segments are recognised, although the segment names vary between sources. In most published papers, the segments from the northeast are named the Takano-Shirahata, the Hinagu and the Yatsushiro Sea segments. In the Active Fault Database of Japan, they are known instead as the Mifune, Yatsushiro and Offshore Minamata segments. The northern part of the Takano-Shirahata segment ruptured during the 2016 earthquake sequence. The 2026 earthquake sequence ruptured the Hinagu segment. Paleoseismic investigations on the Takano-Shirahata segment have identified several earthquakes over the last 15,000 years. The interpreted earthquake ages give overall recurrence interval in the range of 1,791–3,457 years, although the interval between two of the events is much longer. Previous investigations gave recurrence intervals of 5,700 years for the Hinagu segment and 2,800 years for the Yatsushiro Sea segment. The interpreted rupture ages for the Hinagu segment and the Takano-Shirahata segment overlap, suggesting that the Takano-Shirahata and Hinagu segments may have ruptured simultaneously.
