= Mifune (disambiguation) =

Toshiro Mifune (1920–1997) was a Japanese actor who appeared in over 150 feature films.

Mifune may also refer to:

- Jiro Mifune (born 1972), game designer
- Mifune Chizuko (御船千鶴子) (1886–1911), female clairvoyant
- Mika Mifune (三船美佳) (born 1982), actress
- Kyuzo Mifune (三船久蔵) (1883–1965), judoka
- Captain Mifune, a character from The Matrix Revolutions
- Mifune (Soul Eater), a character in the manga and anime Soul Eater
- Admiral Mifune, a character from the anime The Irresponsible Captain Tylor
- Go Mifune, main character in the anime series Speed Racer
- Lord Mifune, a feudal ruler in Usagi Yojimbo
- General Mifune, a Samurai general in Naruto
- Mifune, a 1999 Danish film
- Mifune: The Last Samurai, 2015 American film
- Mifune, a town in Kamimashiki, Kumamoto, Japan.
- Mifune Group
- Mifune Dinosaur Museum
- Mifunesaurus, a dinosaur named after Toshiro Mifune
- Alice Mifune, a character in the game Generation Xth
- Shioriko Mifune, a character in Love Live! Nijigasaki High School Idol Club

== See also ==
- Mifune, Kumamoto (御船町; -machi), town in Kamimashiki District, Kumamoto, Japan
- Mifune's Last Song, a Dogme 95 film by Søren Kragh-Jacobsen
