= Mifune Dinosaur Museum =

- 御船町恐竜博物館
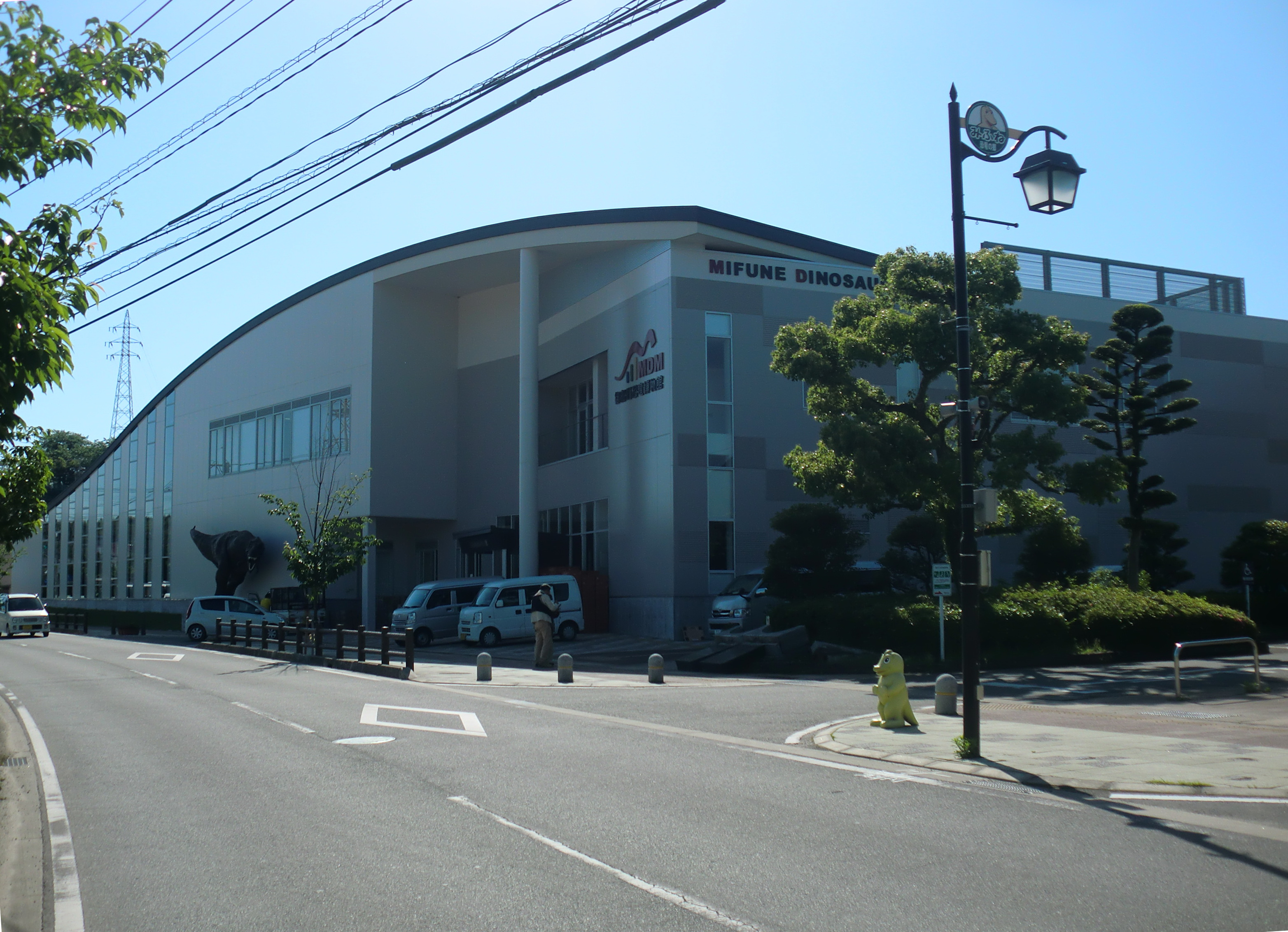
- Interactive map of the Mifune Dinosaur Museum area

General information
- Location: 995-6, Mifune, Kumamoto Prefecture, Japan
- Coordinates: 32°42′49″N 130°48′06″E
- Opened: April 1998

Website
- Official website

Mifune Dinosaur Museum (御船町恐竜博物館, Mifune-machi Kyōryū Hakubutsukan) opened in Mifune, Kumamoto Prefecture, Japan in 1998. The museum collects, preserves, researches, and displays the dinosaur fossils found in the area; the collection, which includes Japan's first fossil from a meat-eating dinosaur, Mifunesaurus, numbers some 15,000 items.

== See also ==
- Fukui Prefectural Dinosaur Museum
