= Kōsa, Kumamoto =

Kōsa 甲佐町
- Town
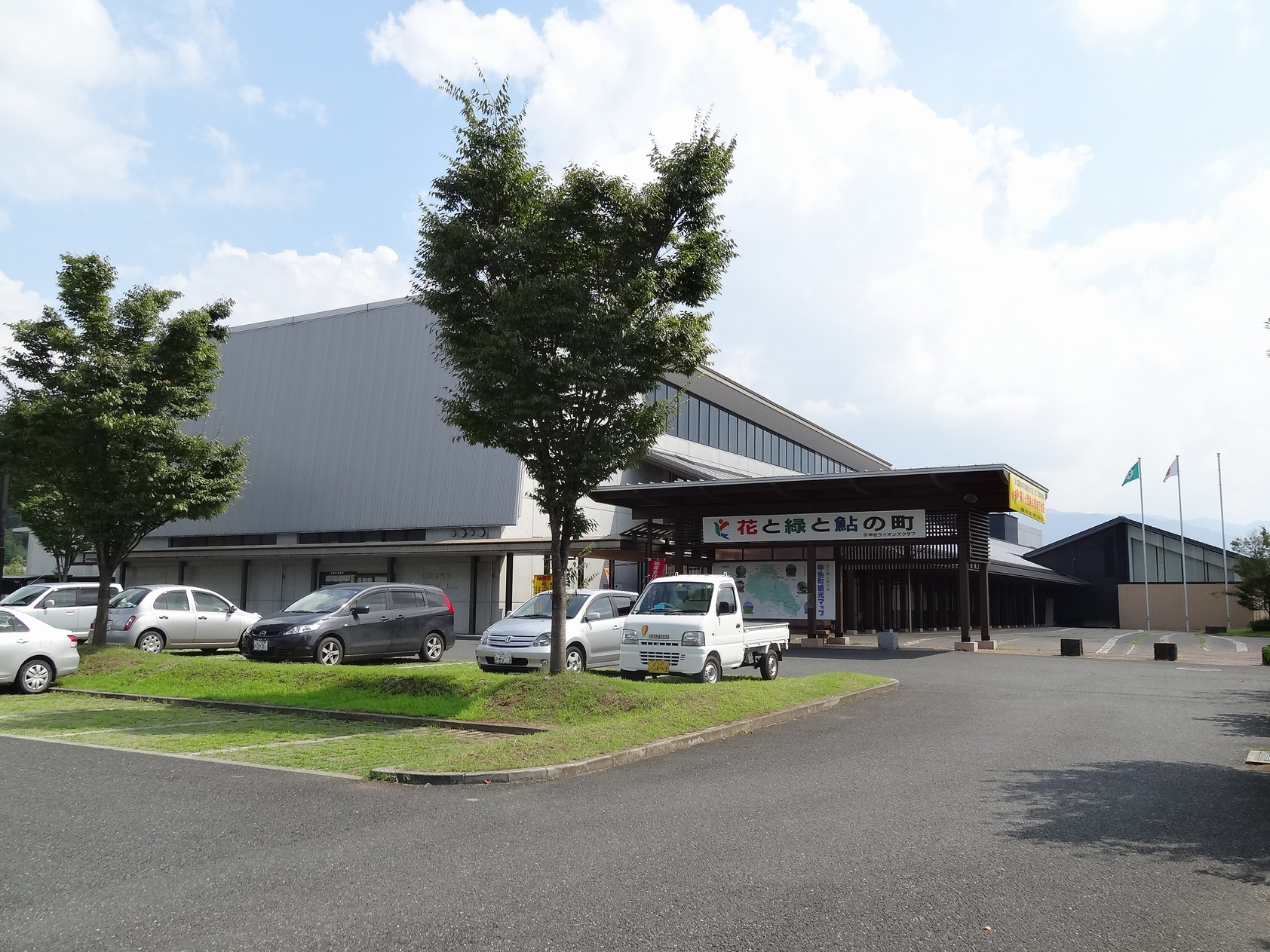
- Kōsa Town Hall

- Flag Emblem
- Interactive map of Kōsa
- Location in Japan
- Coordinates: 32°39′01″N 130°48′41″E
- Country: Japan
- Region: Kyushu
- Prefecture: Kumamoto
- District: Kamimashiki

Area
  - Total: 57.93 km^{2} (22.37 sq mi)

Population (July 31, 2024)
  - Total: 10,004
  - Density: 172.7/km^{2} (447.3/sq mi)
- Time zone: UTC+09:00 (JST)
- City hall address: 719-4 Toyonai, Kosa-cho, Kamimashiki-gun, Kumamoto-ken 861-4696
- Climate: Cfa
- Website: Official website
- Symbols
- Flower: Chrysanthemum
- Tree: Osmanthus fragrans

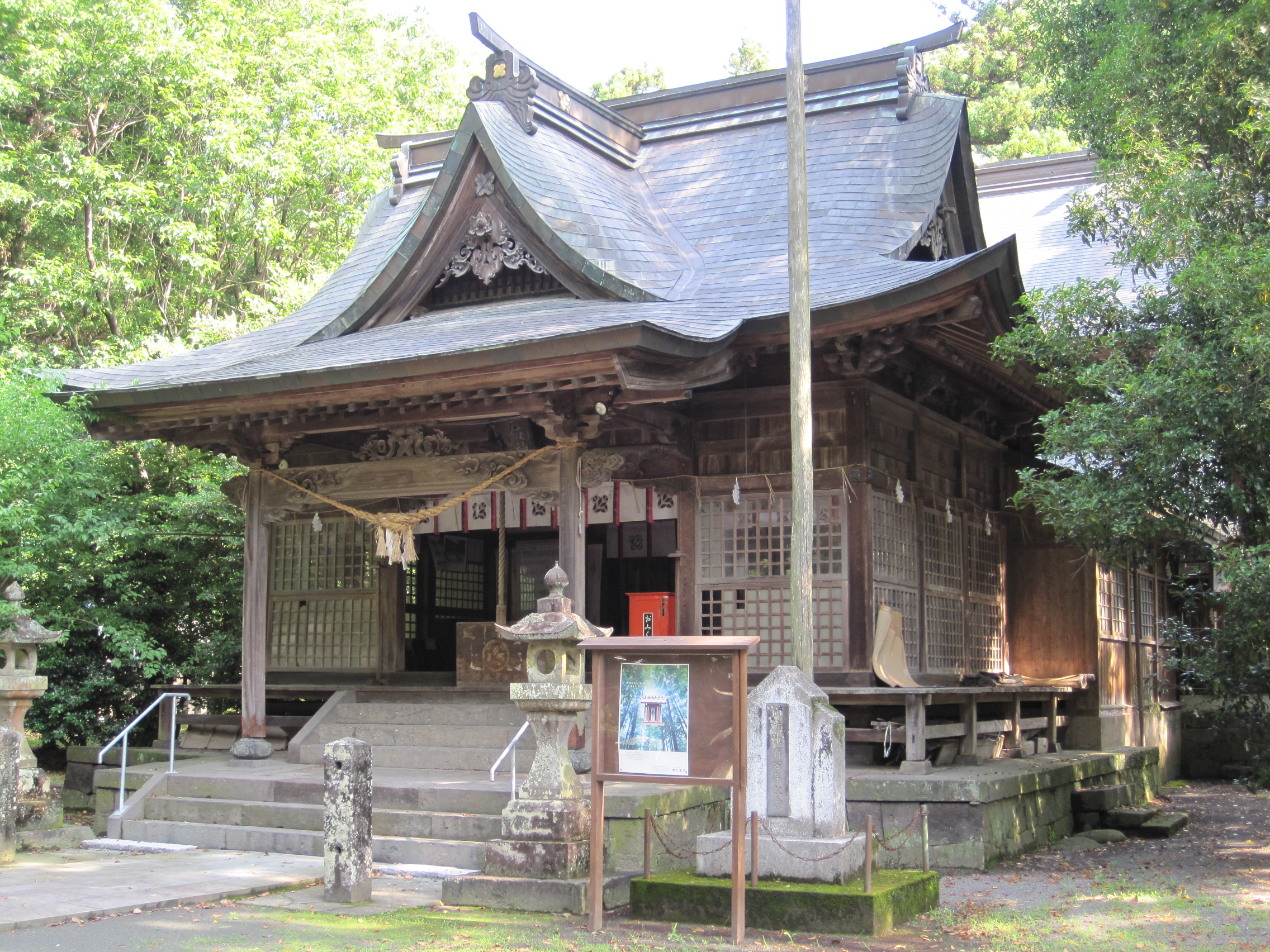
Kōsa Jinja

Kōsa (甲佐町, Kōsa-machi) is a town located in Kamimashiki District, Kumamoto Prefecture, Japan. As of 31 July 2024, the town had an estimated population of 10,004 in 4,441 households, and a population density of 24 persons per km^{2}. The total area of the town is 57.93 km^{2} (22.37 sq mi).

== Geography ==
Kōsa is located in the central inland region of Kumamoto Prefecture, about 20 kilometers southeast of Kumamoto City. The northwestern part is at the southeastern edge of the Kumamoto Plain, but most of the town area is included in the Kyushu Mountains and is at a high altitude. The Midorigawa River, a first-class river, flows through the center of the town.

=== Neighboring municipalities ===
Kumamoto Prefecture

- Kumamoto
- Mifune
- Misato
- Uki

=== Climate ===
Kōsa has a humid subtropical climate (Köppen climate classification Cfa) with hot, humid summers and cool winters. There is significant precipitation throughout the year, especially during June and July. The average annual temperature in Kōsa is 16.3 °C (61.3 °F). The average annual rainfall is 2,145.6 mm (84.47 in) with June as the wettest month. The temperatures are highest on average in August, at around 27.1 °C (80.8 °F), and lowest in January, at around 5.4 °C (41.7 °F). The highest temperature ever recorded in Kōsa was 39.8 °C (103.6 °F) on 3 August 2026; the coldest temperature ever recorded was −8.8 °C (16.2 °F) on 25 January 2016.

Climate data for Kōsa (1991−2020 normals, extremes 1977−present)
Month	Jan	Feb	Mar	Apr	May	Jun	Jul	Aug	Sep	Oct	Nov	Dec	Year
Record high °C (°F)	22.0 (71.6)	25.5 (77.9)	28.8 (83.8)	30.0 (86.0)	34.0 (93.2)	35.7 (96.3)	38.8 (101.8)	39.8 (103.6)	38.1 (100.6)	33.5 (92.3)	29.3 (84.7)	24.6 (76.3)	39.8 (103.6)
Mean daily maximum °C (°F)	10.6 (51.1)	12.3 (54.1)	15.9 (60.6)	21.3 (70.3)	26.0 (78.8)	28.0 (82.4)	31.6 (88.9)	33.0 (91.4)	29.7 (85.5)	24.7 (76.5)	18.6 (65.5)	12.8 (55.0)	22.0 (71.7)
Daily mean °C (°F)	5.4 (41.7)	6.7 (44.1)	10.1 (50.2)	15.0 (59.0)	19.5 (67.1)	23.0 (73.4)	26.5 (79.7)	27.1 (80.8)	23.8 (74.8)	18.5 (65.3)	12.8 (55.0)	7.4 (45.3)	16.3 (61.4)
Mean daily minimum °C (°F)	0.9 (33.6)	1.7 (35.1)	4.7 (40.5)	9.2 (48.6)	14.1 (57.4)	18.9 (66.0)	22.6 (72.7)	22.9 (73.2)	19.5 (67.1)	13.5 (56.3)	8.0 (46.4)	2.8 (37.0)	11.6 (52.8)
Record low °C (°F)	−8.8 (16.2)	−7.2 (19.0)	−3.5 (25.7)	−0.8 (30.6)	5.7 (42.3)	9.6 (49.3)	16.5 (61.7)	15.1 (59.2)	8.0 (46.4)	2.4 (36.3)	−2.7 (27.1)	−4.8 (23.4)	−8.8 (16.2)
Average precipitation mm (inches)	71.5 (2.81)	97.3 (3.83)	133.9 (5.27)	141.1 (5.56)	169.1 (6.66)	473.7 (18.65)	395.2 (15.56)	190.0 (7.48)	201.7 (7.94)	103.0 (4.06)	94.7 (3.73)	74.6 (2.94)	2,145.6 (84.47)
Average precipitation days (≥ 1.0 mm)	8.2	9.2	11.6	10.5	10.1	15.5	13.5	11.4	10.3	7.7	8.3	8.6	124.9
Mean monthly sunshine hours	118.5	130.5	155.8	174.6	182.4	119.9	169.3	195.8	161.5	167.4	138.4	124.4	1,844.7
Source: Japan Meteorological Agency

=== Demographics ===
Per Japanese census data, the population of Kōsa in 2020 is 10,132 people. Kōsa has been conducting censuses since 1920.

Historical population

Year	Pop.	±%
1920	13,880	—
1925	14,629	+5.4%
1930	15,457	+5.7%
1935	15,630	+1.1%
1940	15,314	−2.0%
1945	19,517	+27.4%
1950	19,915	+2.0%
1955	18,610	−6.6%
1960	16,765	−9.9%
1965	14,975	−10.7%
1970	13,620	−9.0%

Year	Pop.	±%
1975	13,160	−3.4%
1980	12,989	−1.3%
1985	12,864	−1.0%
1990	12,459	−3.1%
1995	12,372	−0.7%
2000	12,012	−2.9%
2005	11,604	−3.4%
2010	11,180	−3.7%
2015	10,717	−4.1%
2020	10,132	−5.5%

Kōsa population statistics

== History ==
The area of Kōsa was part of ancient Higo Province, During the Edo Period it was part of the holdings of Kumamoto Domain. After the Meiji restoration, the town of Kōsa and villages of Miyauchi, Tatsuno, Shirahata, and Otome were established with the creation of the modern municipalities system on April 1, 1889. On January 1, 1955, Miyauchi, Tatsuno, Shirahata, and Otome merged with Kōsa.

== Government ==
Kōsa has a mayor-council form of government with a directly elected mayor and a unicameral town council of 11 members. Kōsa, collectively with the other municipalities of Kamimashiki District contributes two members to the Kumamoto Prefectural Assembly. In terms of national politics, the town is part of the Kumamoto 3rd district of the lower house of the Diet of Japan.

== Economy ==
The local economy relies on agriculture, and Kōsa's geographic position as a logistics hub.

== Education ==
Kōsa has four public elementary schools and one public junior high school operated by the town government, and one public high schools operated by the Kumamoto Prefectural Board of Education.

== Transportation ==
=== Railways ===
Kōsa does not have any passenger railway service. The nearest station is Matsubase Station on the JR Kyushu station is Matsubase Station on the Kagoshima Main Line in neighboring Uki.

=== Highways ===
- Kyushu Expressway
- National Route 443

== Sports ==
Since its inception in 1983, the Kumamoto Kōsa 10-Miler road race has seen several top rated achievements being set during the event, which is run in December. The most recent new world record for the 10 miles was set in December 2022 by Bernard Koech.
