= Kyushu Chūō Expressway =

Expressway in Japan

Kyushu Chūō Expressway
- 九州中央自動車道

Route information
- Maintained by Ministry of Land, Infrastructure, Transport and Tourism
- Length: 95 km (59 mi)
- Existed: 2006–present

Major junctions
- West end: Kashima Junction; Kyushu Expressway in Kashima, Kumamoto
- East end: Nobeoka Interchange; Higashikyushu Expressway; National Route 10 in Nobeoka, Miyazaki

Location
- Country: Japan

Highway system
- National highways of Japan; Expressways of Japan

The Kyushu Chūō Expressway (九州中央自動車道, Kyūshū-Chūō Jidōsha-dō) is an incomplete two-lane national expressway that crosses the island of Kyushu, namely in Kumamoto Prefecture and Miyazaki Prefecture. It is owned and operated primarily by the Ministry of Land, Infrastructure, Transport and Tourism (MLIT), but has a short section maintained and tolled by the West Nippon Expressway Company at its western terminus at the Kyushu Expressway. The route is signed E77 under MLIT's "2016 Proposal for Realization of Expressway Numbering."

== Interchanges ==
- IC - interchange, JCT - junction, SA - service area, PA - parking area, BS - bus stop, TN - tunnel, BR - bridge, TB - toll gate
- Bus stops labeled "○" are currently in use; those marked "◆" are closed.

No.	Name	Connections	Dist. from Origin	Bus stop	Notes	Location	
15-2	Kashima JCT	Kyushu Expressway	0.0			Kumamoto	Kashima
TB	Mashiki TB		0.9			Kumamoto	Mashiki
1	Oike-Takayama IC	National Route 443 (Tsuchiyama Bypass)	1.8			Kumamoto	Mifune
2	Ueno-Yoshimuta IC	Pref. Route 221 (Tashiro Mifune Route)				Kumamoto	Mifune
3	Yamato Nakashima-Nishi IC	National Route 445	12.6			Kumamoto	Yamato
—	Kita-Nakashima IC	National Route 445; Pref. Route 152 (Inanoo Kōsa Route)			Planned	Kumamoto	Yamato
—	Yabe IC	National Route 218	23.0		Planned	Kumamoto	Yamato
18 km gap in the expressway, connection is made by National Route 218						Kumamoto	Yamato
—	Soyō IC				Planned	Kumamoto	Yamato
—	Gokase-Nishi IC				Planned	Miyazaki	Gokase
—	Gokase-Higashi IC	National Route 218 (Gokase Takachiho Road)	0.0		Planned; northbound exit, southbound entrance	Miyazaki	Gokase
—	Takachiho IC	National Route 218 (Gokase Takachiho Road)	9.2		Planned	Miyazaki	Takachiho
Planned						Miyazaki	Takachiho
—	Makado Intersection	National Route 218 (Takachiho Hinokage Road); Pref. Route 7 (Ogata Takachiho Route)			Planned; beginning of concurrency with Takachiho Hinokage Road	Miyazaki	Takachiho
0.6 km gap in the expressway, connection is made by National Route 218						Miyazaki	Takachiho
	Unkai-bashi Intersection		0.0		South end of concurrency with Takachiho Hinokage Road	Miyazaki	Takachiho
	Hinokage-Fukasumi IC		2.8			Miyazaki	Hinokage
	Hirasoko Intersection	National Route 218 (Takachiho Hinokage Road)	5.1			Miyazaki	Hinokage
16 km gap in the expressway, connection is made by National Route 218						Miyazaki	Hinokage
	Kurata Intersection	National Route 218 (Kitakata Nobeoka Road)	0.0			Miyazaki	Nobeoka
	Kitagata IC	Pref. Route 242 (Kitagata Interchange Route)	4.6			Miyazaki	Nobeoka
	Maino IC	National Route 218	11.0		Northbound exit, southbound entrance	Miyazaki	Nobeoka
22	Nobeoka JCT/IC	Higashikyushu Expressway; National Route 10 (Nobeoka Road); Nobeoka Interchange Road	13.1	○		Miyazaki	Nobeoka
1.000 mi = 1.609 km; 1.000 km = 0.621 mi
