= Heisei College of Music =

Coordinates: 32°42′43″N 130°47′26″E

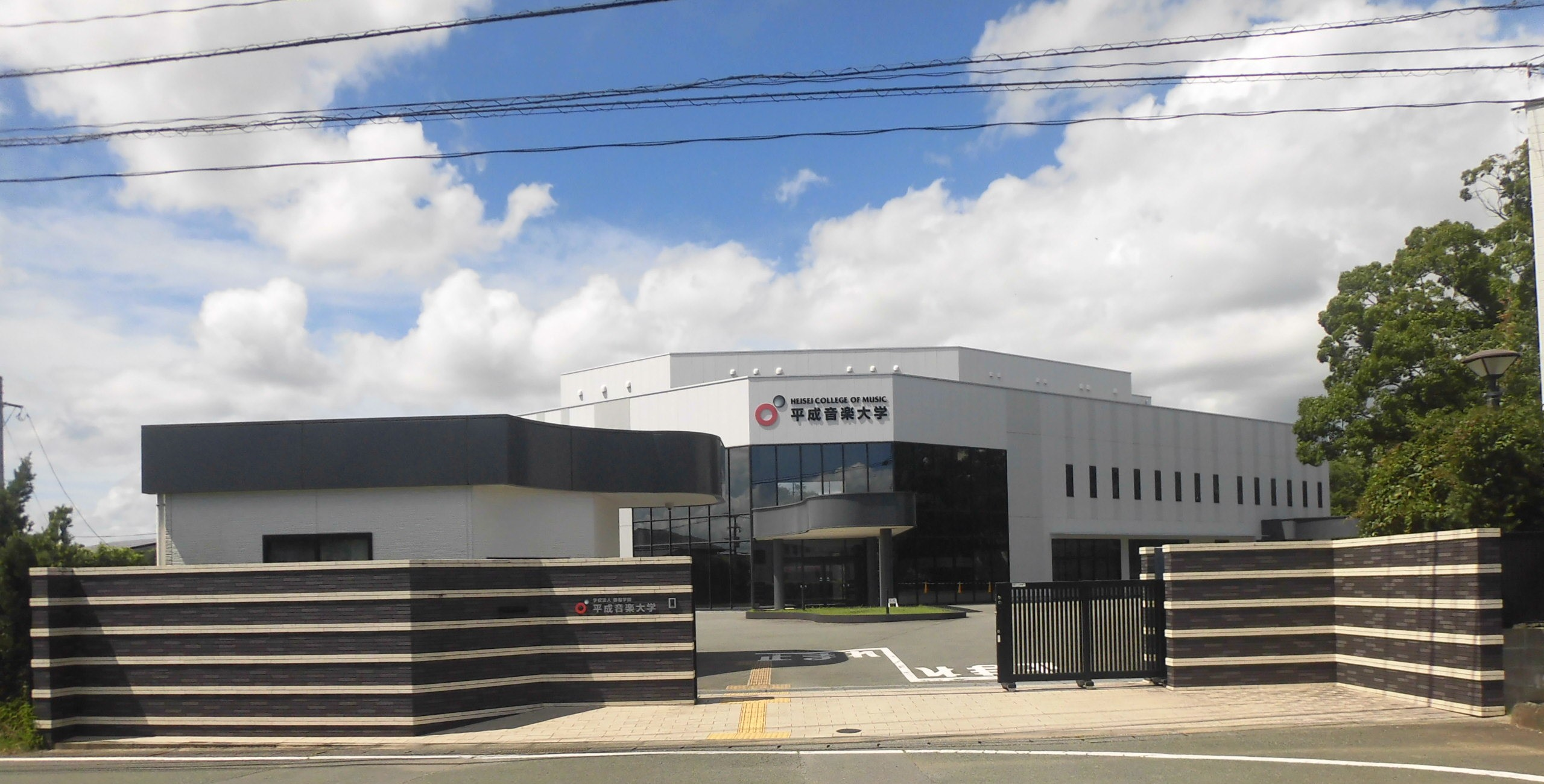
Heisei College of Music

Heisei College of Music (平成音楽大学, Heisei ongaku daigaku) is a private university in Mifune, Kumamoto, Japan. The school was first established in 1972 as a junior college and became a four-year college in 2001.
