= Nishihara, Kumamoto =

Nishihara 西原村
- Village
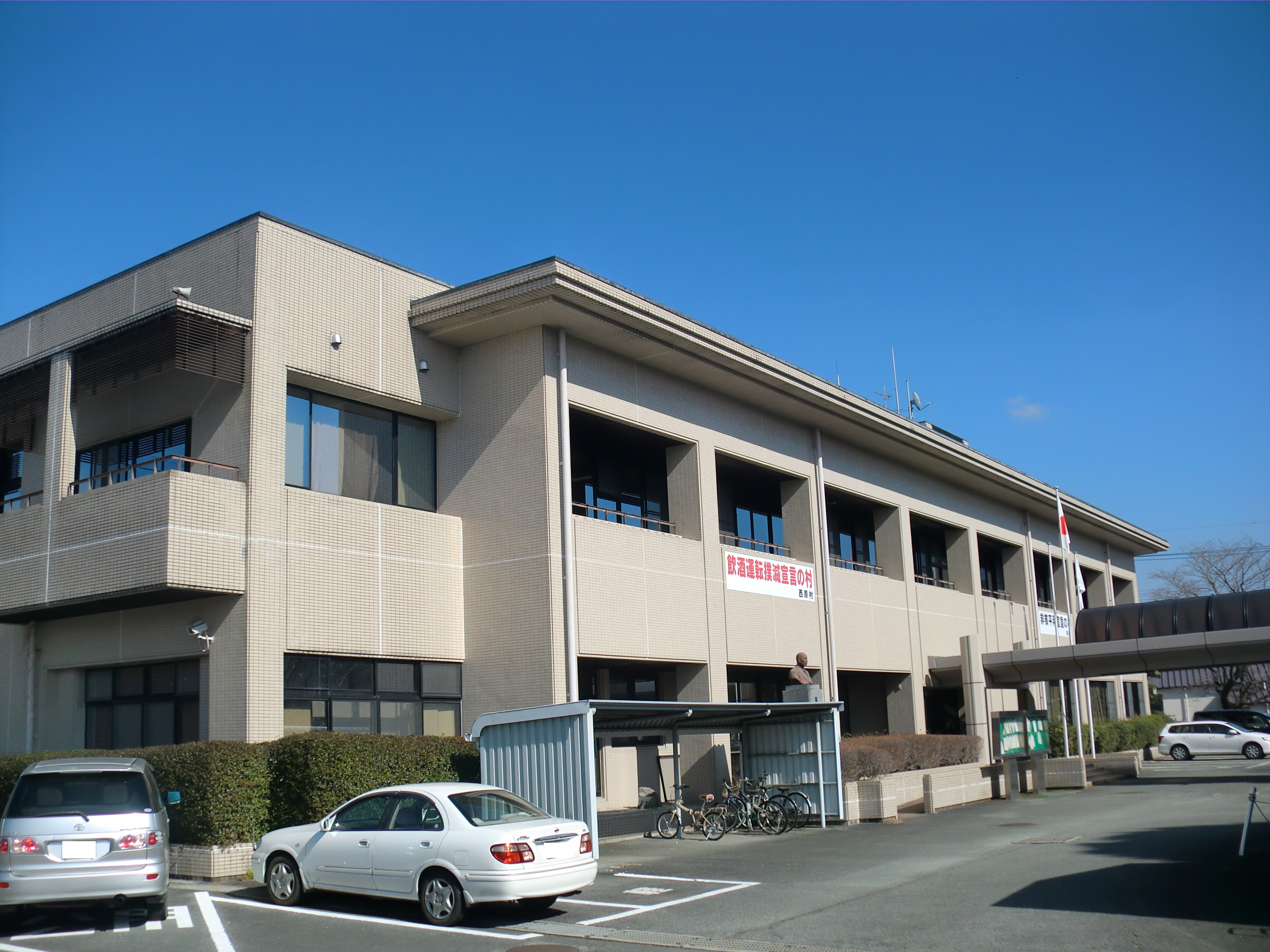
- Nishihara Village office

- Flag Seal
- Location of Nishihara in Kumamoto Prefecture

- Location in Japan
- Coordinates: 32°50′05″N 130°54′11″E
- Country: Japan
- Region: Kyushu
- Prefecture: Kumamoto
- District: Aso

Area
  - Total: 77.22 km^{2} (29.81 sq mi)

Population (August 30, 2024)
  - Total: 7,035
  - Density: 91.10/km^{2} (236.0/sq mi)
- Time zone: UTC+09:00 (JST)
- City hall address: 3259 Komori, Nishihara-mura, Aso-gun, Kumamoto-ken 861-2492
- Website: Official website
- Symbols
- Bird: Green Pheasant
- Flower: Chrysanthemum × morifolium
- Tree: Oak

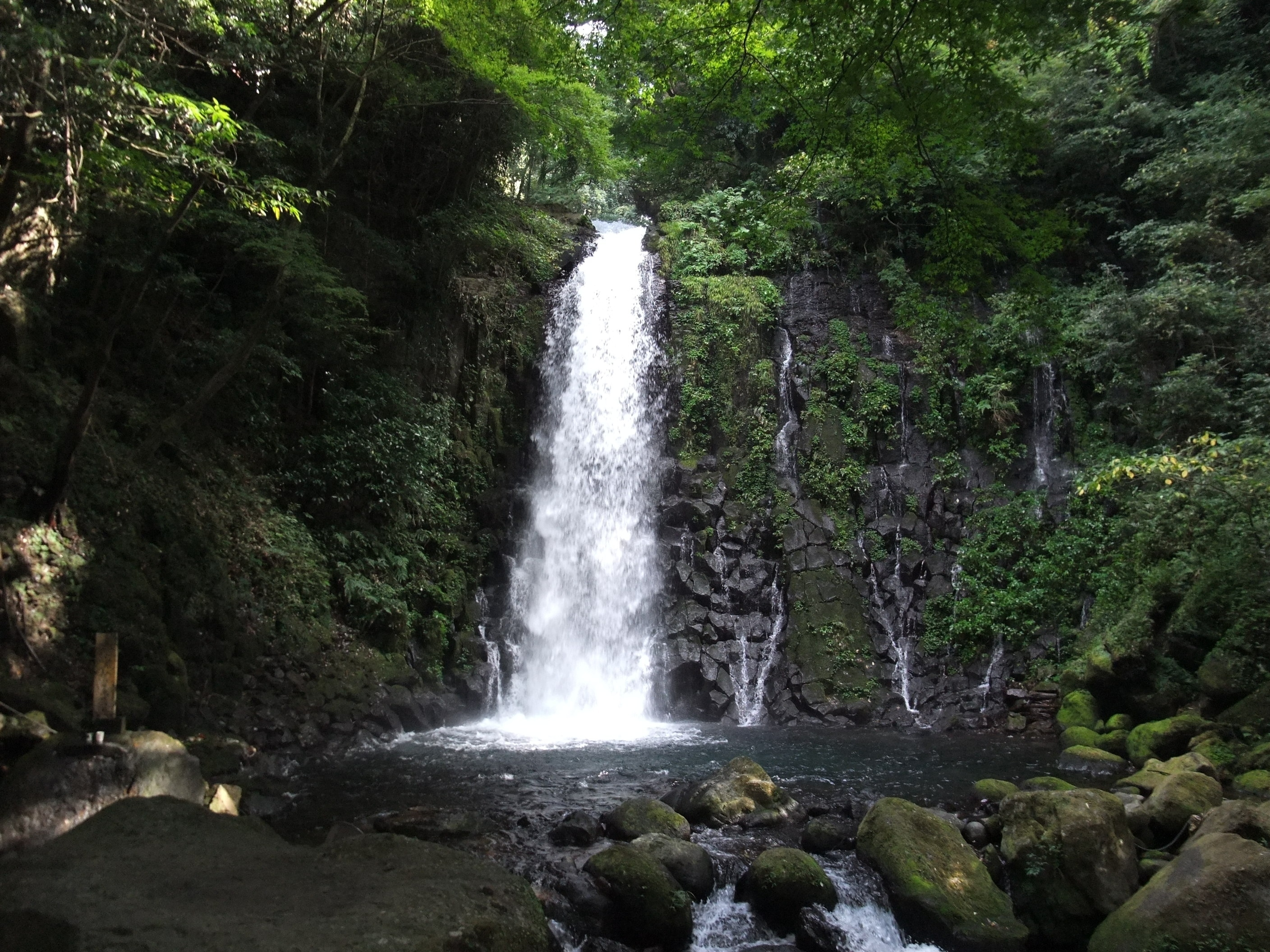
Shiraito Falls in Nishihara

Nishihara (西原村, Nishihara-mura) is a village located in Aso District, Kumamoto Prefecture, Japan. As of 31 August 2024, the village had an estimated population of 7035 in 3044 households, and a population density of 91 persons per km^{2}. The total area of the village is 77.22 km^{2} (29.81 sq mi).

== Geography ==
Nishihara Village is located about 20 kilometers east of the urban center of Kumamoto City, between the Kumamoto metropolitan area and the Aso Caldera (Nango Valley). It is located at the western foot of the Aso outer rim, and is a lush village with many plains and forests.

=== Neighboring municipalities ===
Kumamoto Prefecture

- Mashiki
- Mifune
- Minamiaso
- Ōzu
- Yamato

=== Climate ===
Nishihara has a humid subtropical climate (Köppen Cfa) characterized by warm summers and cool winters with light to no snowfall. The average annual temperature in Nishihara is 14.5 °C. The average annual rainfall is 1918 mm with September as the wettest month. The temperatures are highest on average in August, at around 25.2 °C, and lowest in January, at around 3.6 °C.

=== Demographics ===
Per Japanese census data, the population of Nishihara is as shown below

Historical population
Year	Pop.	±%
1960	6,469	—
1970	5,132	−20.7%
1980	4,824	−6.0%
1990	5,024	+4.1%
2000	5,728	+14.0%
2010	6,792	+18.6%
2020	6,426	−5.4%

== History ==
The area of Nishihara was part of ancient Higo Province. In the Edo Period, it was part of the holdings of Kumamoto Domain. Following the Meiji restoration, the villages of Yamanishi and Kawara were established on April 1, 1889 with the creation of the modern municipalities system. The two villages merged on September 1, 1960 to form the village of Nishihara.

=== 2016 earthquakes ===
Nishihara was badly damaged in the 2016 Kumamoto earthquakes, experiencing Shindo 6- shaking on April 14 and Shindo 7 (the highest level) shaking on April 16, and all residents were temporarily evacuated for fear that a nearby dam might collapse.

== Government ==
NIshihara has a mayor-council form of government with a directly elected mayor and a unicameral village council of 10 members. Nishihara, collectively with the other municipalities of Aso District, contributes one member to the Kumamoto Prefectural Assembly. In terms of national politics, the village is part of the Kumamoto 3rd district of the lower house of the Diet of Japan.

== Economy ==
The economy of Nishihara is largely agricultural, with sweet potato and peanuts as the mai crops. Due it its proximity to Kumamoto, the village population is increasing with commuters.

== Education ==
Nishihara has two public elementary schools and one public junior high school operated by the village government. The village does not have a high school.

== Transportation ==
=== Railways ===
Nishihara does not have any passenger railway service. The nearest station is Higo-Ōzu Station on the JR Kyushu Hōhi Main Line in neighboring Ōzu.

=== Highway ===
Nishihara is not on any national highways or expressways. The nearest highway interchange is the Kyushu Expressway Mashiki Kumamoto Airport Interchange in neighboring Mashiki.

== See also ==
- 2016 Kumamoto earthquake
