= Matsubase Station =

Railway station in Uki, Kumamoto Prefecture, Japan

Matsubase Station 松橋駅
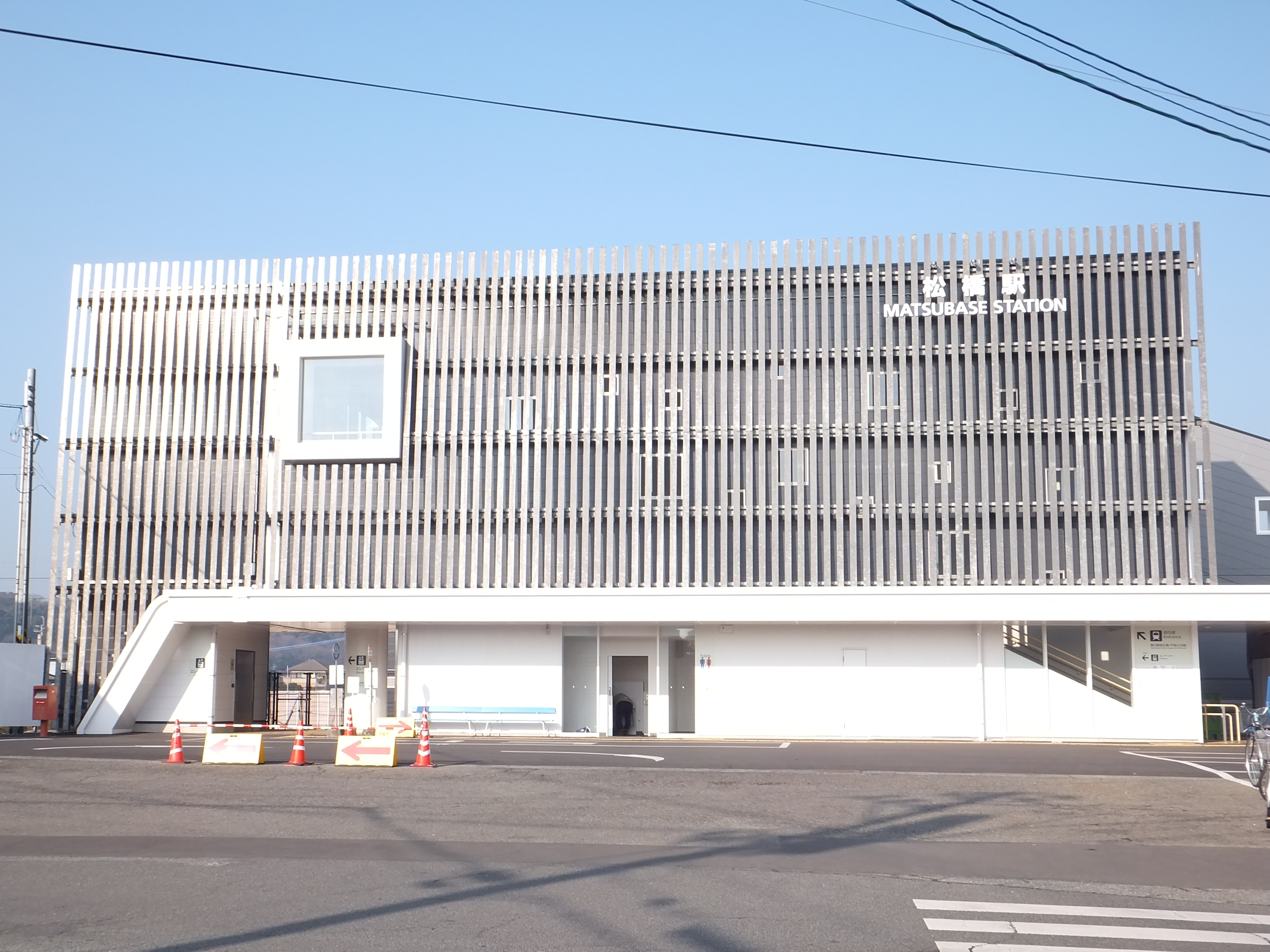
- Matsubase Station in January 2017

General information
- Location: Goryo Shiranuhimachi, Uki-shi, Kumamoto-ken 869-0551; Japan
- Coordinates: 32°39′08″N 130°40′14″E
- Operator: JR Kyushu
- Line: ■ Kagoshima Main Line
- Platforms: 1 island platform
- Tracks: 2

Construction
- Structure type: At grade

Other information
- Website: Official website

History
- Opened: 28 January 1895

Passengers
- FY2020: 1340 daily
- Rank: 109th (among JR Kyushu stations)

Services
Preceding station	JR Kyushu	Following station
Ogawa towards Kagoshima	Kagoshima Main Line	Uto towards Mojikō
Location
- Location within Kumamoto Prefecture Location within Japan

Matsubase Station (松橋駅, Matsubase-eki) is a passenger railway station located in the city of Uki, Kumamoto Prefecture, Japan. It is operated by JR Kyushu.

== Lines ==
The station is served by the Kagoshima Main Line and is located 212.3 km from the starting point of the line at Mojiko.

== Layout ==
The station consists of one island platform with an elevated station building. The east and west exits are connected by a free passage. The station is staffed.

=== Platforms ===
1	■ ■ Kagoshima Main Line	for Shin-Yatsushiro and Yatsushiro
2	■ ■ Kagoshima Main Line	for Kumamoto

== History ==
Matsubase Station was opened on 28 January 1895 as a station on the Kyushu Railway, which was nationalized in 1907. The first station building was strafed in an air raid on 27 July 1945, killing 24 people in a train stopped at the station. After the privatization of the Japanese National Railways (JNR) on 1 April 1987, the station came under JR Kyushu.

== Passenger statistics ==
In fiscal 2020, the station was used by an average of 1340 passengers daily (boarding passengers only), and it ranked 109th among the busiest stations of JR Kyushu.

== See also ==
- List of railway stations in Japan

== Surrounding area ==
- Uki City Hall
- Shiranui Art Museum
- Tsukaharadaira Kofun
