= Beppu–Shimabara graben =

Valley in Kyushu, Japan

The Beppu-Shimabara graben (別府‐島原地溝帯, Beppu-Shimabara Chikōtai) is a geological structure that runs across the middle of Kyushu, Japan, from Beppu Bay in the east to the Shimabara Peninsula in the west. The area is known for its volcanic, geothermal, and seismic activity. It encompasses several significant geological features, including a number of active volcanoes. The most prominent is Mount Aso, an active volcanic formation consisting of one of the world's largest calderas and a central crater group with five distinct peaks. Beppu Onsen is located at the eastern end of the graben.

It is located at the overlap of two magma types—within plate type to the north, and island-arc type to the south—that erupted in the Quaternary: to the north, the eastern end of the Eurasian Plate and, to the south, the subduction zone of the Philippine Sea Plate. It runs about 200 kilometres east to west and its north-south width varies between 20 and 30 kilometres.
