= Kashima, Kumamoto =

Kashima 嘉島町
- Town
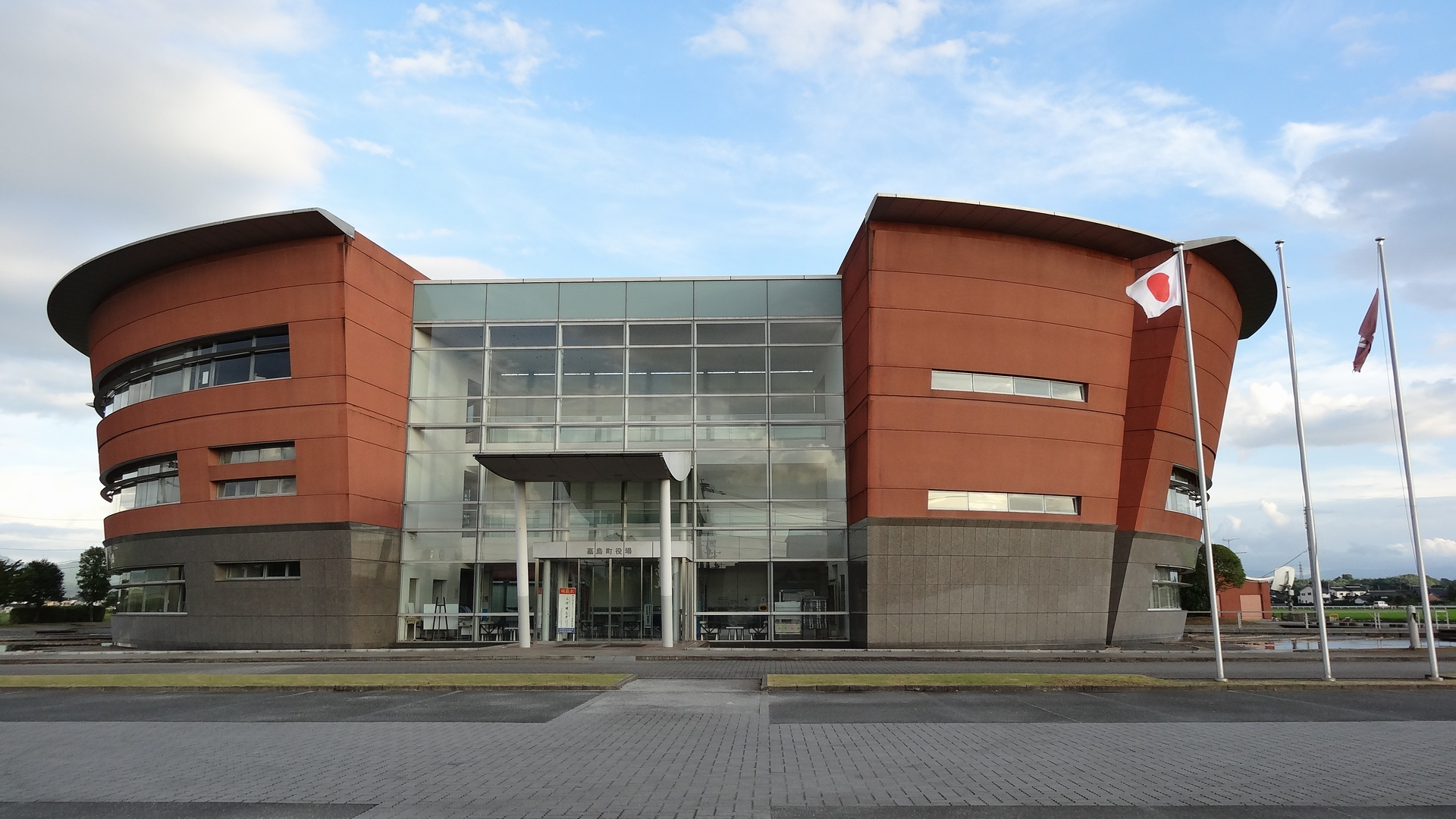
- Kashima Town Office

- Flag Chapter
- Interactive map of Kashima
- Location in Japan
- Coordinates: 32°44′24″N 130°45′26″E
- Country: Japan
- Region: Kyushu
- Prefecture: Kumamoto
- District: Kamimashiki

Area
  - Total: 16.65 km^{2} (6.43 sq mi)

Population (August 31, 2024)
  - Total: 10,203
  - Density: 612.8/km^{2} (1,587/sq mi)
- Time zone: UTC+09:00 (JST)
- City hall address: 530 Kamishima, Kashima-cho, Kamimashiki-gun, Kumamoto-ken 861-3192
- Website: Official website
- Symbols
- Bird: Eurasian skylark
- Flower: Cosmos
- Tree: Osmanthus fragrans

Kashima (嘉島町, Kashima-machi) is a town located in Kamimashiki District, Kumamoto Prefecture, Japan. As of 31 July 2024, the town had an estimated population of 10,203 in 4135 households, and a population density of 24 persons per km^{2}. The total area of the town is 16.65 km^{2} (6.43 sq mi).

== Geography ==
Kashima is located in central Kumamoto Prefecture, adjacent to southeast Kumamoto City.

=== Neighboring municipalities ===
Kumamoto Prefecture

- Kumamoto
- Mashiki
- Mifune

=== Climate ===
Kashima has a humid subtropical climate (Köppen Cfa) characterized by warm summers and cool winters with light to no snowfall. The average annual temperature in Kashima is 16.5 °C. The average annual rainfall is 1965 mm with September as the wettest month. The temperatures are highest on average in August, at around 27.0 °C, and lowest in January, at around 6.2 °C.

=== Demographics ===
Per Japanese census data, the population of Kashima is as shown below

Historical population
Year	Pop.	±%
1940	6,980	—
1950	8,961	+28.4%
1960	8,600	−4.0%
1970	7,712	−10.3%
1980	7,731	+0.2%
1990	7,295	−5.6%
2000	8,145	+11.7%
2010	8,676	+6.5%
2020	9,547	+10.0%

== History ==
The area of Kashima was part of ancient Higo Province, During the Edo Period it was part of the holdings of Kumamoto Domain. After the Meiji restoration, the villages of Okawa, Uejima and Roka were established with the creation of the modern municipalities system on April 1, 1889. Okawa and Uejima merged to form the village of Oshima in 1905. On January 1, 1955, Oshima and Roka merged to form the town of Kashima.

There were numerous deaths at the Aeon Mall in Kashima when it collapsed during the 2026 Kumamoto earthquake.

== Government ==
Yamato has a mayor-council form of government with a directly elected mayor and a unicameral town council of 11 members. Kashima, collectively with the other municipalities of Kamimashiki District contributes two members to the Kumamoto Prefectural Assembly. In terms of national politics, the town is part of the Kumamoto 3rd district of the lower house of the Diet of Japan.

== Economy ==
The economy of Kashima is centered on light manufacturing, food processing and agriculture. Suntory has a large factory in Kashima.

== Education ==
Kashima has two public elementary schools and one public junior high schools operated by the town government. The town does not have a high school.

== Transportation ==
=== Railways ===
Kashima does not have any passenger railway service. The nearest station is Minami-Kumamoto Station on the JR Kyushu Hōhi Main Line.

=== Highways ===
- National Route 266
- National Route 445

== Notable people from Kashima ==
- Yoshiazuma Hiroshi, sumo wrestler
- Shigeyoshi Matsumae, founder of Tokai University
