= Mifune, Kumamoto =

Mifune 御船町
- Town
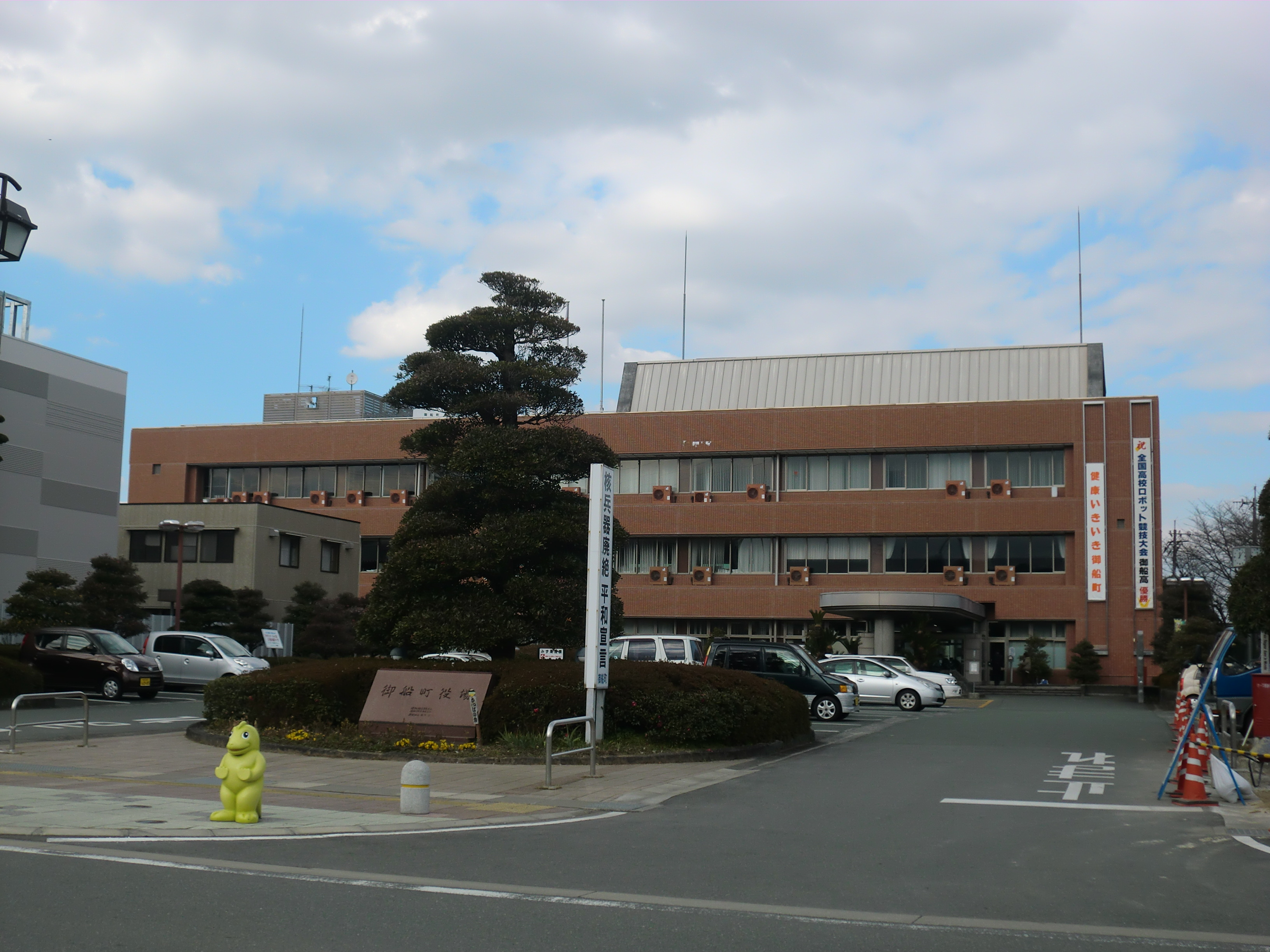
- Mifune town hall

- Flag Chapter
- Interactive map of Mifune
- Location in Japan
- Coordinates: 32°42′52″N 130°48′07″E
- Country: Japan
- Region: Kyushu
- Prefecture: Kumamoto
- District: Kamimashiki

Area
  - Total: 99.03 km^{2} (38.24 sq mi)

Population (August 21, 2024)
  - Total: 17,254
  - Density: 174.2/km^{2} (451.3/sq mi)
- Time zone: UTC+09:00 (JST)
- City hall address: 995-1 Oaza Mifune, Mifune-cho, Kamimashiki-gun, Kumamoto-ken 861-3296
- Website: Official website
- Symbols
- Flower: Wisteria floribunda
- Tree: Ternstroemia gymnanthera

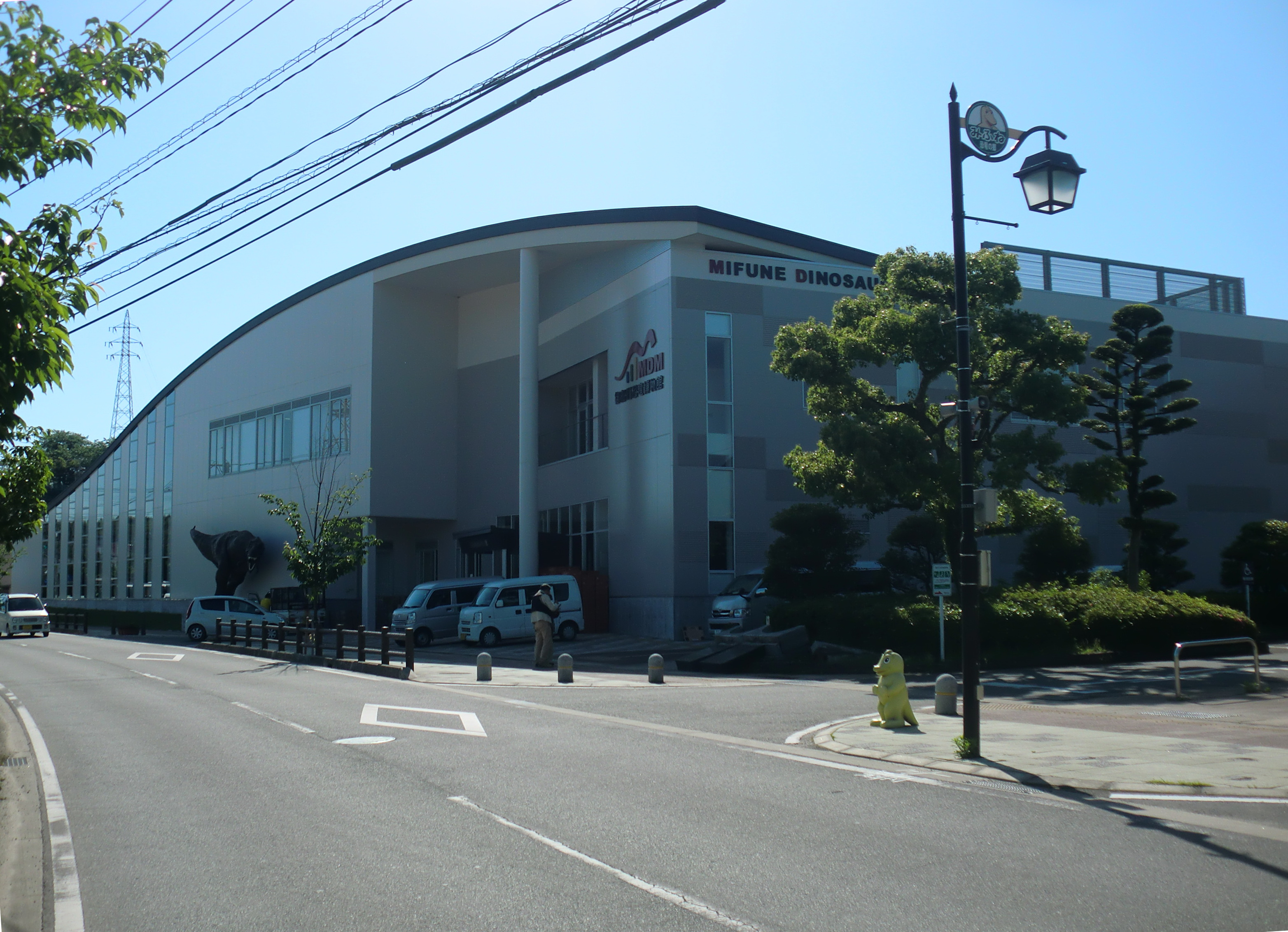
Mifune Dinosaur Museum

Mifune (御船町, Mifune-machi) is a town located in Kamimashiki District, Kumamoto Prefecture, Japan. As of 31 July 2024, the town had an estimated population of 17,254 in 7647 households, and a population density of 170 persons per km^{2}. The total area of the town is 99.03 km^{2} (38.24 sq mi).

== Geography ==
Mifune is located in central Kumamoto Prefecture.

=== Palaeontology ===
In March 2014, a piece of sandstone was found in Mifune that was revealed to contain a tooth dated to the Late Cretaceous, 90 million years ago. The tooth is the oldest thus found in Japan and is assumed to be a back tooth from the left, upper jaw of a carnivore similar to a Deltatheridium, an ancient marsupial relative that lived in what is now Mongolia between 145 and 66 million years ago. The find was announced by the Mifune Dinosaur Museum in August 2017. The museum and town also partner with Montana State University's Museum of the Rockies.

=== Neighboring municipalities ===
Kumamoto Prefecture

- Kashima
- Kumamoto
- Kōsa
- Mashiki
- Misato
- Nishihara
- Yamato

=== Climate ===
Mifune has a humid subtropical climate (Köppen Cfa) characterized by warm summers and cool winters with light to no snowfall. The average annual temperature in Mifune is 14.6 °C. The average annual rainfall is 1965 mm with September as the wettest month. The temperatures are highest on average in August, at around 25.23 °C, and lowest in January, at around 3.7 °C.

=== Demographics ===
Per Japanese census data, the population of Mifune is as shown below

Historical population
| Year | Pop. | ±% |
|---|---|---|
| 1940 | 18,119 | — |
| 1950 | 23,383 | +29.1% |
| 1960 | 21,543 | −7.9% |
| 1970 | 17,716 | −17.8% |
| 1980 | 17,536 | −1.0% |
| 1990 | 17,952 | +2.4% |
| 2000 | 18,532 | +3.2% |
| 2010 | 17,888 | −3.5% |
| 2020 | 16,303 | −8.9% |

== History ==
The area of Mifune was part of ancient Higo Province, and was the site of several battles in the Nanboku-chō period, Sengoku period and in the Satsuma rebellion. Its name comes from a legend that this is where Kofun period Emperor Keiko's ship was docked during his residence in Kyushu. During the Edo Period it was part of the holdings of Kumamoto Domain, under which it flourished as a mercantile town. After the Meiji restoration, the town of Mifune was established with the creation of the modern municipalities system on April 1, 1889.

== Government ==
Mifune has a mayor-council form of government with a directly elected mayor and a unicameral town council of 14 members. Mifune, collectively with the other municipalities of Kamimashiki District contributes two members to the Kumamoto Prefectural Assembly. In terms of national politics, the town is part of the Kumamoto 3rd district of the lower house of the Diet of Japan.

== Economy ==
The local economy is based on light manufacturing, commerce and agriculture.

== Education ==
Mifune has six public elementary schools and one public junior high school operated by the town government, and one public high schools operated by the Kumamoto Prefectural Board of Education. The Heisei College of Music is located in Mifune.

== Transportation ==
=== Railways ===
Mifune does not have any passenger railway service. The nearest station is Minami-Kumamoto Station on the JR Kyushu Hōhi Main Line.

=== Highways ===
- Kyushu Chūō Expressway
- Kyushu Chūō Expressway
- National Route 443
- National Route 445
