= Yabe Shūhen Prefectural Natural Park =

Natural park in Kumamoto Prefecture, Japan

- 矢部周辺県立自然公園
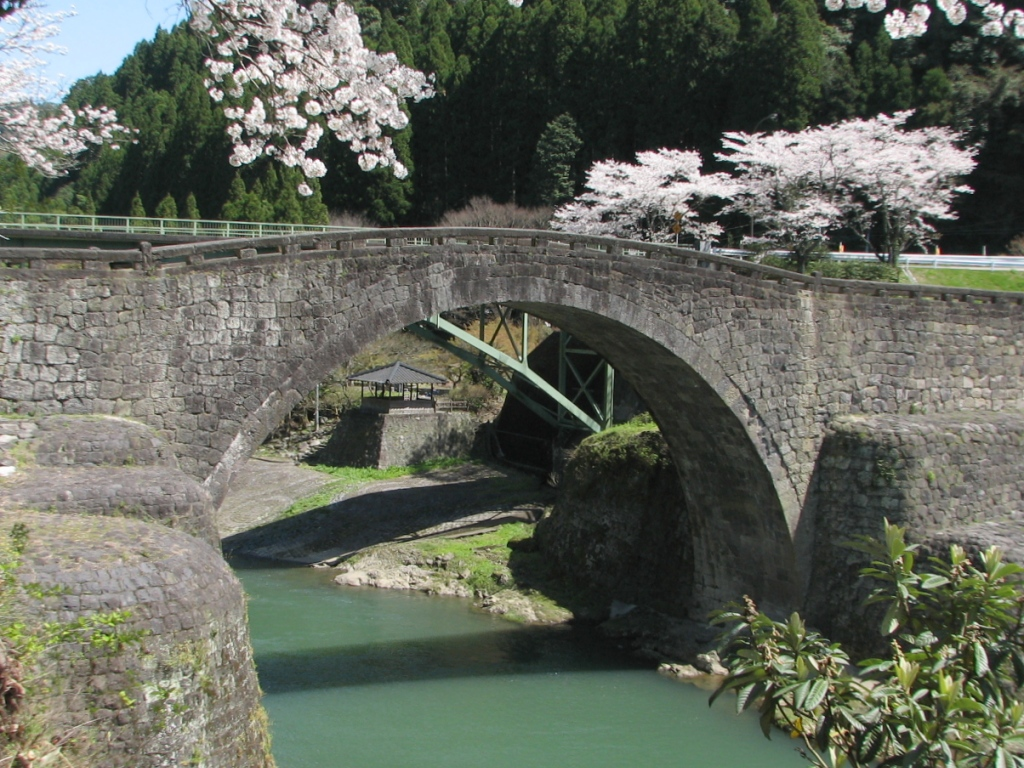
- Reidai Bridge

- Location within Kumamoto Prefecture Location within Japan
- Location: Kumamoto Prefecture, Japan
- Coordinates: 32.65°N 131.02°E
- Area: 140.21 km^{2} (54.14 sq mi)
- Established: 3 August 1957

Yabe Shūhen Prefectural Natural Park (矢部周辺県立自然公園, Yabe Shūhen kenritsu shizen kōen) is a Prefectural Natural Park in eastern Kumamoto Prefecture, Japan. Established in 1957, the park spans the municipalities of Kōsa, Mifune, Misato, and Yamato. The park encompasses the Gorōga Falls (五老ヶ滝), Unoko Falls (鵜の子滝), Reidai Bridge (霊台橋), and Tsūjun Bridge.

== See also ==
- National Parks of Japan
