= Tanoura =

Tanoura may refer to:

- Tanoura (dance), an Egyptian folk dance
- Tanoura (costume), a weighted skirt typically used in the dance
- Tanoura, Kumamoto, a former town in Japan
