= Seiwa, Kumamoto =

Dissolved municipality in Kumamoto prefecture, Japan

Seiwa (清和村, Seiwa-son) was a village located in Kamimashiki District, Kumamoto Prefecture, Japan.

== Population ==
As of 2003, the village had an estimated population of 3,122 people and a population density of 24.11 people per km^{2}. The total area was 129.49 km^{2}.

== History ==
On February 11, 2005, Seiwa, along with the town of Yabe (also from Kamimashiki District), and the town of Soyō (from Aso District), merged to create the town of Yamato and no longer exist as independent municipality.
