= Kugino, Kumamoto =

Village in Aso, Kumamoto, Japan

Coordinates: 32°50′N 131°02′E

Kugino (久木野村, Kugino-mura) was a village located in Aso District, Kumamoto Prefecture, Japan.

As of 2003, the village had an estimated population of 2,566 and a population density of 50.67 persons per km^{2}. The total area was 50.64 km^{2}.

On February 13, 2005, Kugino, along with the villages of Chōyō and Hakusui (all from Aso District), was merged to create the village of Minamiaso and no longer exists as an independent municipality.
