= Akira Mutō =

Japanese officer and war criminal (1892–1948)

- 武藤 章
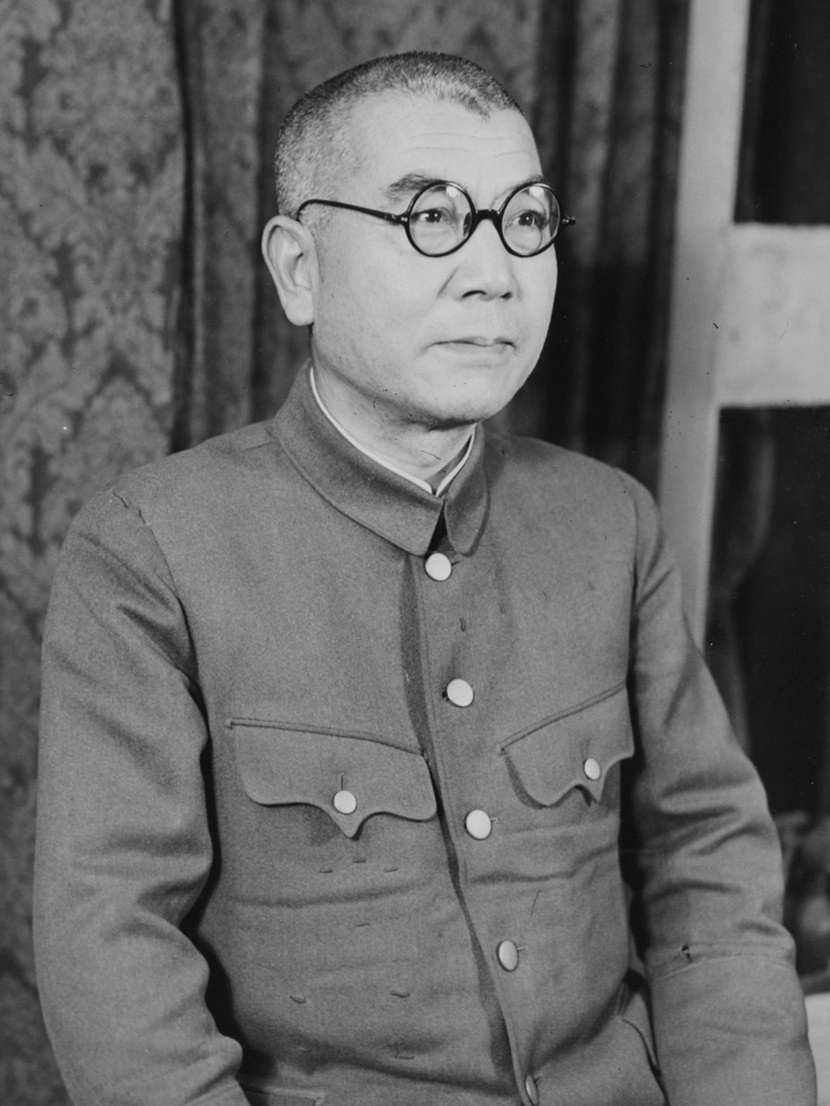
- Mutō in 1947
- Born: 15 December 1892; Hakusui, (present day of Minamiaso, Kumamoto) Japan
- Died: 23 December 1948 (aged 56); Sugamo Prison, Tokyo, Allied-occupied Japan
- Status: Executed by hanging
- Convictions: Crimes against peace War crimes
- Trial: International Military Tribunal for the Far East
- Penalty: Death
- Military career
- Allegiance: Empire of Japan
- Branch: Imperial Japanese Army
- Service years: 1913–1945
- Rank: Lieutenant General
- Commands: Imperial Guards Division; Military Affairs Bureau
- Conflicts: Second Sino-Japanese War: Nanjing massacre; World War II: Manila massacre

Akira Mutō (武藤 章, Mutō Akira; 15 December 1892 – 23 December 1948) was a general in the Imperial Japanese Army during World War II. He was convicted of war crimes and was executed by hanging. Mutō was implicated in both the Nanjing Massacre and the Manila massacre.

== Biography ==
Mutō was a native of Hakusui, Kumamoto, and a graduate of the 25th class of the Imperial Japanese Army Academy in 1913. He graduated from the 32nd class of the Army Staff College in 1920. Mutō was assigned as a military attaché to Germany from 1923 to 1926. On his return to Japan, he served in various administrative and staff positions within the Imperial Army General Staff Office.

Mutō was on the strategic planning staff of the General Staff Office in 1935, and was chief of the military intelligence section of the Kwantung Army at the time of the Marco Polo Bridge Incident. He is believed to have been one of the planners behind the incident which sparked the Second Sino-Japanese War.

Promoted to Vice Chief of Staff of the Japanese Central China Area Army, Mutō was in China for many of the initial campaigns of the conflict, and was later charged with having led troops during the worst excesses of the Nanjing Massacre. Mutō was recalled to Japan in 1939, promoted to major general in 1939, and served on the Military Affairs Bureau of the Ministry of War.

Promoted to lieutenant general just prior to the start of the Pacific War, Mutō served as director of the Military Affairs Bureau at the time of the attack on Pearl Harbor. He was assigned command of the Second Imperial Guards Division at Singapore in April 1942. He was later assigned to command Japanese forces on Sumatra in Japanese -occupied Netherlands East Indies from June 1944, and was transferred to the Philippines in October 1944, where he was appointed chief of staff of the Japanese Fourteenth Area Army under General Tomoyuki Yamashita.

He was accused of having conducted a campaign of slaughter, torture and other atrocities against the Filipino civilian population, prisoners of war and civilian internees, and by ordering guerrilla containment.

After the surrender of Japan, Mutō was arrested by the American occupation authorities and charged with war crimes before the International Military Tribunal for the Far East. He was convicted for atrocities against civilians and prisoners of war in both China and the Philippines, and was executed by hanging at Sugamo Prison on 23 December 1948.
