= Ashikita Kaigan Prefectural Natural Park =

Natural park in Kumamoto Prefecture, Japan

- 芦北海岸県立自然公園
- Location within Kumamoto Prefecture Location within Japan
- Location: Kumamoto Prefecture, Japan
- Coordinates: 32.32°N 130.48°E
- Area: 44.80 km^{2} (17.30 sq mi)
- Established: 1 April 1956

Ashikita Kaigan Prefectural Natural Park (芦北海岸県立自然公園, Ashikita Kaigan kenritsu shizen kōen) is a Prefectural Natural Park on the coast of southwest Kumamoto Prefecture, Japan. Established in 1956, the park spans the municipalities of Ashikita, Minamata, Tsunagi, and Yatsushiro.

== See also ==
- National Parks of Japan
- Unzen-Amakusa National Park
