= Soyō, Kumamoto =

Dissolved municipality in Kumamoto prefecture, Japan

Soyō (蘇陽町, Soyō-machi) was a town located in Aso District, Kumamoto Prefecture, Japan.

As of 2003, the town had an estimated population of 4,506 and a density of 37.89 persons per km^{2}. The total area was 118.92 km^{2}.

On February 11, 2005, Soyō, along with the town of Yabe, and the village of Seiwa (both from Kamimashiki District), was merged to create the town of Yamato and no longer exists as an independent municipality.
