= Oguni, Kumamoto =

Oguni 小国町
- Town
- Tsuetate Onsen

- Flag Emblem
- Location of Oguni in Kumamoto Prefecture

- Location in Japan
- Coordinates: 33°07′18″N 131°4′5″E
- Country: Japan
- Region: Kyushu
- Prefecture: Kumamoto
- District: Aso

Area
  - Total: 136.94 km^{2} (52.87 sq mi)

Population (August 1, 2024)
  - Total: 6,346
  - Density: 46.34/km^{2} (120.0/sq mi)
- Time zone: UTC+09:00 (JST)
- City hall address: 1567-1 Miyahara, Oguni-machi, Aso-gun, Kumamoto-ken 869-2592
- Website: Official website
- Symbols
- Bird: Varied tit
- Flower: Calanthe discolor
- Tree: Cryptomeria

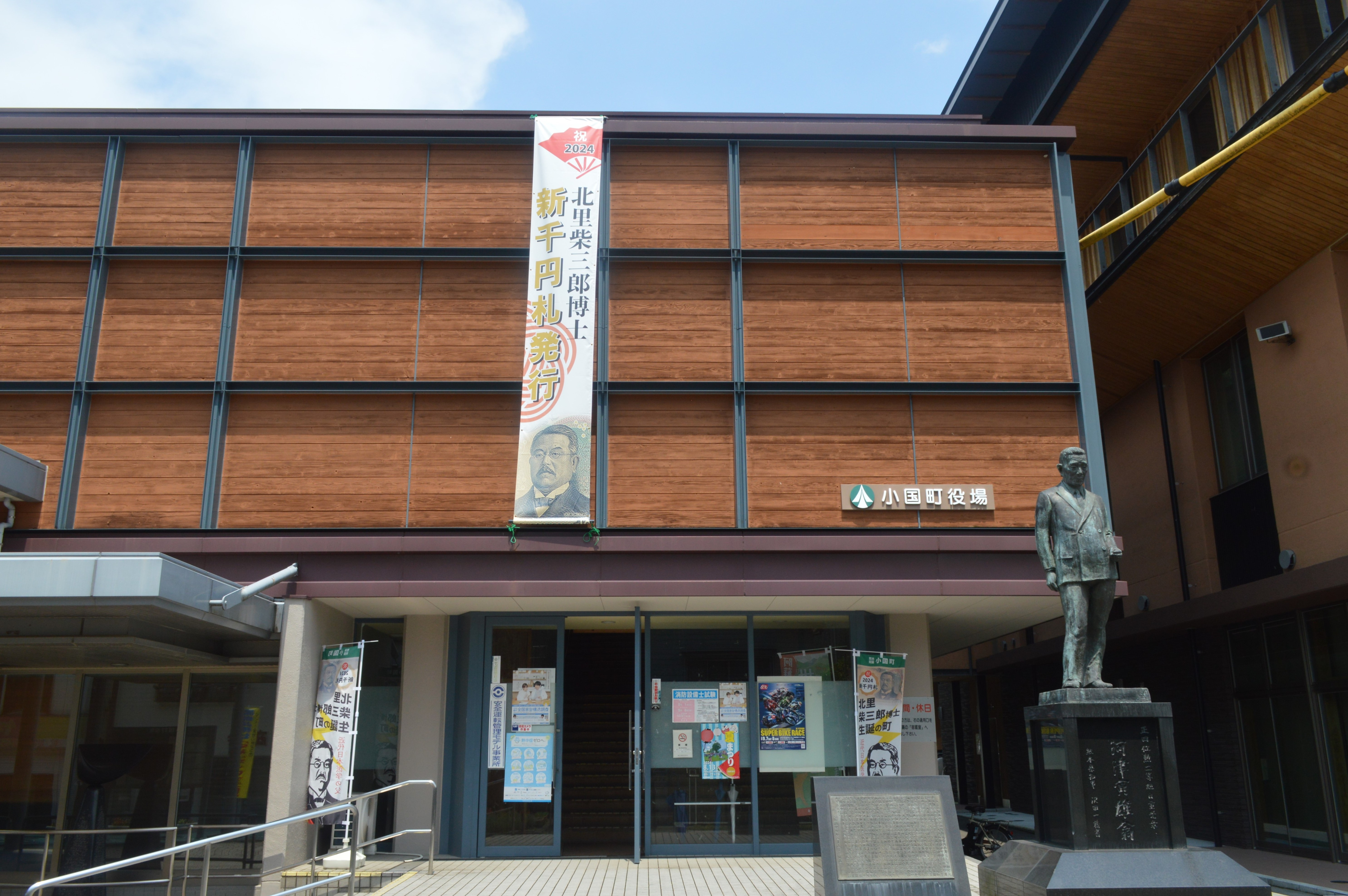
Oguni Town Hall

Oguni (小国町, Oguni-machi) is a town in Aso District, Kumamoto Prefecture, Japan. As of 1 August 2024, the town had an estimated population of 6,346 in 2993 households, and a population density of 46 persons per km^{2}. The total area of the town is 136.94 km^{2} (52.87 sq mi).

== Geography ==
Oguni is located in the Kyushu Mountains in central Kyushu, at the northern end of Kumamoto Prefecture. The eastern, northern, and western parts of the town border Oita Prefecture. Approximately 80% of the town is forest, and approximately 75% of that forest is man-made cedar forest

=== Neighboring municipalities ===
Kumamoto Prefecture

- Minamioguni

Ōita Prefecture

- Hita
- Kusu
- Kokonoe

=== Climate ===
Oguni has a humid subtropical climate (Köppen Cfa) characterized by warm summers and cool winters with light to no snowfall. The average annual temperature in Oguni is 12.5 °C. The average annual rainfall is 1846 mm with September as the wettest month. The temperatures are highest on average in August, at around 22.8 °C, and lowest in January, at around 0.7 °C.

=== Demographics ===
Per Japanese census data, the population of Oguni is as shown below

Historical population
Year	Pop.	±%
1940	12,336	—
1950	15,189	+23.1%
1960	16,022	+5.5%
1970	12,509	−21.9%
1980	10,813	−13.6%
1990	9,854	−8.9%
2000	8,954	−9.1%
2010	7,877	−12.0%
2020	6,590	−16.3%

== History ==
The area of Ubayama was part of ancient Higo Province, During the Edo Period it was part of the holdings of Kumamoto Domain. After the Meiji restoration, the village of Kitaoguni was established on April 1, 1889, with the creation of the modern municipalities system. Kitaoguni was raised to town status on April 1, 1935

== Government ==
Oguni has a mayor-council form of government with a directly elected mayor and a unicameral town council of 12 members. Oguni, collectively with the other municipalities of Aso District contributes one member to the Kumamoto Prefectural Assembly. In terms of national politics, the town is part of the Kumamoto 3rd district of the lower house of the Diet of Japan.

== Economy ==
Forestry has long been the main industry in Oguni. In agriculture, radish production and Jersey cattle breeding, which were introduced in the late 1950s, are popular. There is also a natural hot spring facility in the town, and tourism plays a role in the locale economy.

== Education ==
Oguni has one public elementary school and one public junior high schools operated by the town government and one public high school operated by the Kumamoto Prefectural Board of Education. The prefecture also operates one special education school for the handicapped.

== Transportation ==
=== Railways ===
The town has not had any passenger railway service since the closure of the Miyahara Line in 1984. Bungo-Mori Station on the JR Kyushu Kyūdai Main Line is the nearest station.

=== Highways ===
- National Route 212
- National Route 387
- National Route 442

== Local attractions ==
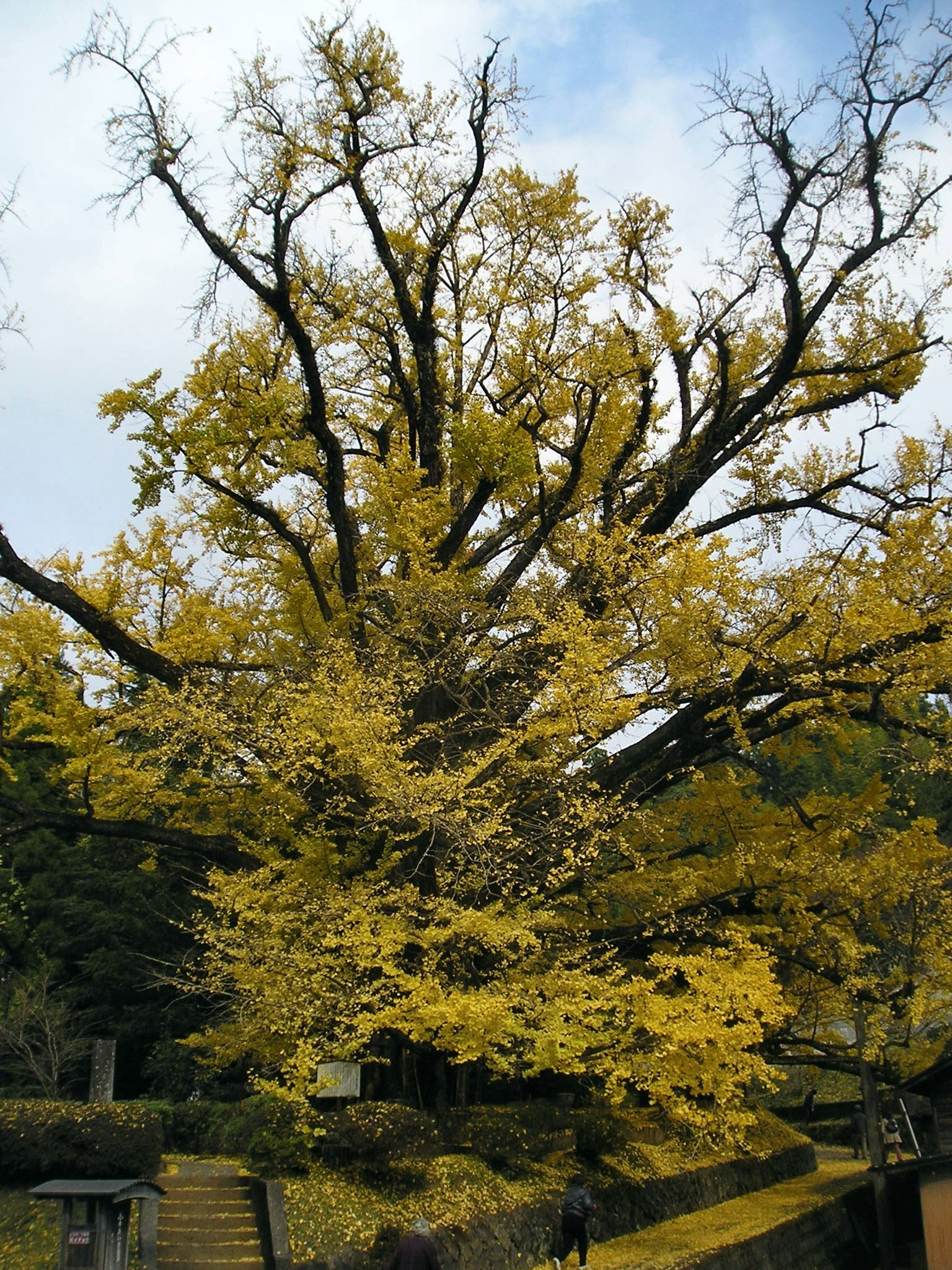
Ginkgo biloba in Shimonojō area

- Kitasato Shibasaburō Memorial Museum: Oguni is Kitasato's birthplace.
- Nabegataki Falls (鍋ケ滝)
- Nuruyu Onsen (奴留湯温泉)
- Sakamoto Zenzo Museum of Art
- Tsuetate Onsen (杖立温泉)

== Notable people from Oguni ==
- Hiroshi Katsuno, actor
- Kitasato Shibasaburō
