= Chōyō, Kumamoto =

Village located in Kumamoto Prefecture, Japan

Chōyō (長陽村, Chōyō-mura) was a village located in Aso District, Kumamoto Prefecture, Japan.

As of 2003, the village had an estimated population of 5,436 and a population density of 140.21 persons per km^{2}. The total area was 38.77 km^{2}.

On February 13, 2005, Chōyō, along with the villages of Hakusui and Kugino (all from Aso District), was merged to create the village of Minamiaso and no longer exists as an independent municipality.
