= Yasunosuke Futa =

Japanese village Chief

- Born: 26 November 1801; Yabe, Kumamoto, Japan
- Died: 3 April 1873 (aged 71)
- Occupation: Village chief
- Known for: Construction of Tsūjun Bridge

Yasunosuke Futa (布田 保之助, Futa Yasunosuke; 26 November 1801 – 3 April 1873) was a village chief and also an architect in Kumamoto Prefecture, Japan. He built an aqueduct, Tsujun Bridge, which improved the fertility of the land.

== History ==
Futa inherited the post of village chief at the age of twenty-three. At the age of thirty, he was entrusted to extend rice fields and was provided with the funds to do so. He became a full-fledged village chief at the age of thirty-two. Within that same year, he was awarded a prize for successfully keeping nationwide famine away from his village. Futa undertook the construction of the notable Tsujun Bridge, which was completed on July 29, 1854. He was recognized and lauded for his contributions to the village, particularly by Lord Hosokawa for the bridge. He remained village chief until he died on 3 April 1873, at the age of seventy-one.

== Tsujun Bridge ==
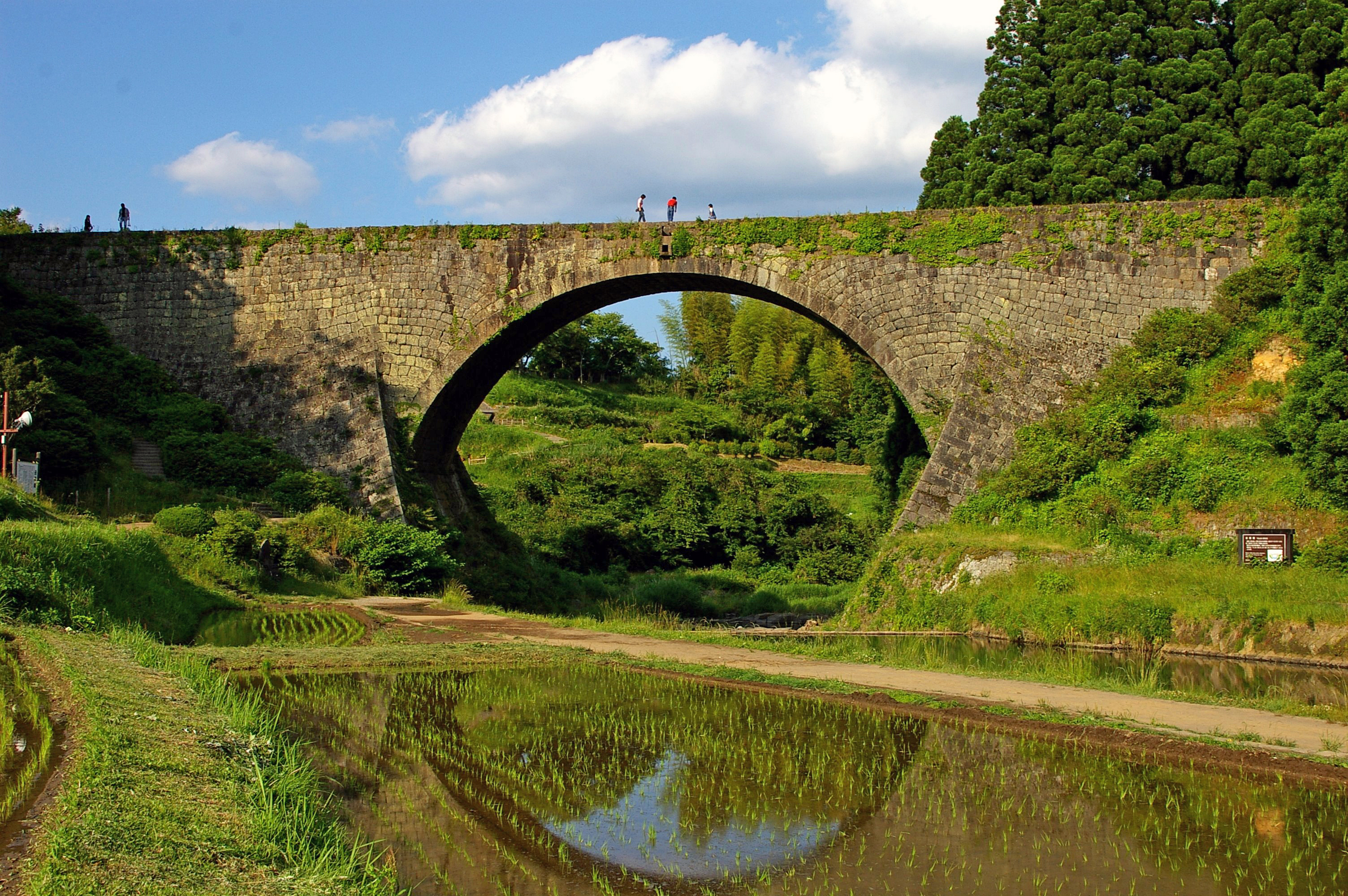
Tsujun Bridge, 10 June 2007 with water flowing from left to right

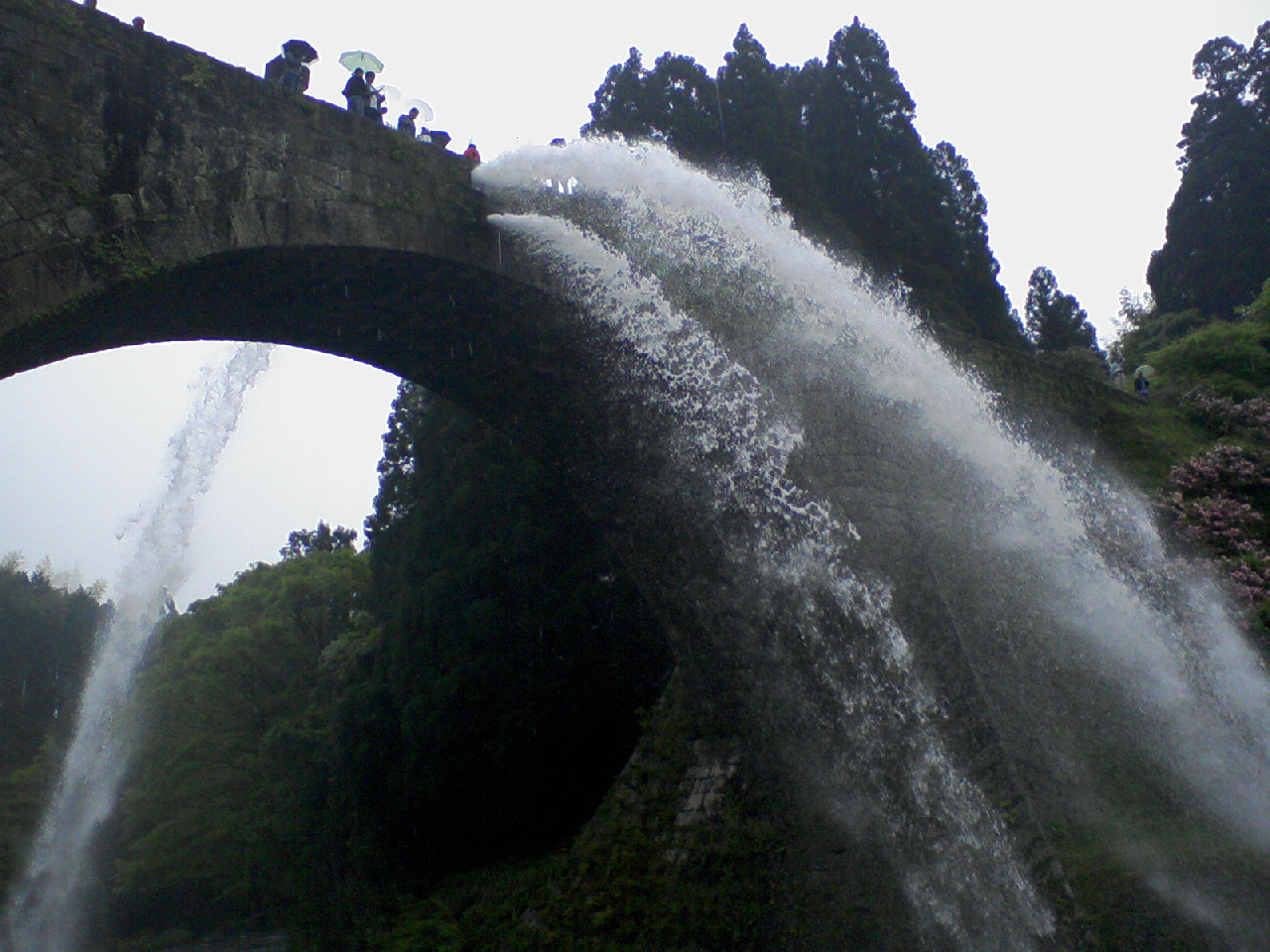
Tsujun Bridge, 4 May 2007, pouring water for tourists

Tsujun Bridge is an aqueduct in Yabe, Kumamoto. Completed in 1854, it is an arch bridge 84 meters long, with an arch that spans 27.3 meters. It is the largest stone aqueduct in Japan. The aqueduct was 6 meters lower than the upper part of the waterway, and because of this, a reversed siphon mechanism works when water is allowed to flow through the aqueduct. The stone aqueduct was made watertight with mortar. In order to keep the aqueduct in good working condition, and for the safety of viewers such as tourists, water is poured into the river once in a while.

== Factors of Futa's success ==
Before construction of the Tsujun Bridge, Futa had completed a number of construction works including bridges, and already had a great reputation.

=== Achievements of Yasunosuke Futa ===
- Roads, 320 places
  - Distance of new roads: 28 Ri (Ri=about 4 km)
  - Stone pavements, 21 places (1440 Ken) (Ken=1.8m)
  - Stone bridges, 2
  - Waterways, 194 Ken
  - Highways, 23 places (9066 Ken)
  - Village roads, 48729 Ken
- Arch bridges, 13 bridges (second largest is over Sendai River)
- Banks, 7 places
  - Ide, 15181 Ken
- Stone masonry, 35 places

For 7 years, Futa had saved money for the construction, but he had to get the approval of his superiors. Because Futa was a village chief, he could not attend the budget conference of Higo Province, but his superiors such as Gennosuke Mano (Oometsuke) and Han-emon Kouzuma (Gundai) attended. Lord Hosokawa allowed stone technicians to study the framework of Kumamoto Castle, which was exceptional.

Futa used his own money to send teams of technicians, such as Kangoro Hashimoto and Sangoro Iwanaga, to Nagasaki and Bungo to study the construction of arch bridges.

== Cost of construction ==
The cost of construction was ¥150,0000,000, according to Seiki Ishii. This estimate is based on the direct cost of 710 Kan; this is roughly the same as 800 Kan, which was the direct cost of Lord Shigekata Hosokawa's traveling with a little less than 1000 followers to Osaka for Sankin kotai (alternate attendance).

== Economical effectiveness of the aqueduct ==
Futa was very clever in stating that he would open 42 Cho (1 Cho = 99.17 a) of rice fields; the real number of rice fields opened was 73 Cho, making a difference of 31 Cho more than he had promised. This meant that the money he could use would be very great.

== Technology ==
Futa observed a rotten rainwater pipe which blew out water, and it gave him the idea for the reversed siphon system, a method of sending water to higher land. He made three waterways and a bridge to let water cross a river to higher land. The water pressure was too high for wood, so the construction material was changed to stone. Special mortar was developed to make the waterways tight. On the day of completion, Futa stood in a spot where, if the bridge failed, he would die.

== See also ==
- History of Kumamoto Prefecture
