= Misumi-Ōyano Umibe Prefectural Natural Park =

Natural park in Kumamoto Prefecture, Japan

- 三角大矢野海辺県立自然公園
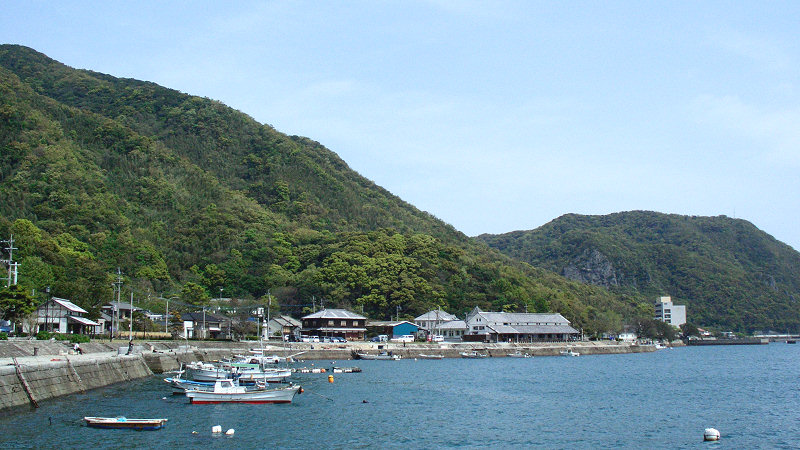
- Misumi west port
- Interactive map of Misumi-Ōyano Umibe Prefectural Natural Park
- Location: Kumamoto Prefecture, Japan
- Area: 45.96 km^{2} (17.75 sq mi)
- Established: 1 July 1956

Misumi-Ōyano Umibe Prefectural Natural Park (三角大矢野海辺県立自然公園, Misumi-Ōyano Umibe kenritsu shizen kōen) is a Prefectural Natural Park on the west coast of Kumamoto Prefecture, Japan. Established in 1956, the park spans the municipalities of Kami-Amakusa, Uki, and Uto.

== See also ==
- National Parks of Japan
- Unzen-Amakusa National Park
