= Yabe, Kumamoto =

Dissolved municipality in Kumamoto Prefecture, Japan

Yabe (矢部町, Yabe-machi) was a town located in Kamimashiki District, Kumamoto Prefecture, Japan.

As of 2003, the town had an estimated population of 11,820 and a density of 39.88 persons per km^{2}. The total area was 296.42 km^{2}.

On February 11, 2005, Yabe, along with the village of Seiwa (also from Kamimashiki District), and the town of Soyō (from Aso District), was merged to create the town of Yamato and no longer exists as an independent municipality.
