= Yamato, Kumamoto =

Yamato 山都町
- Town
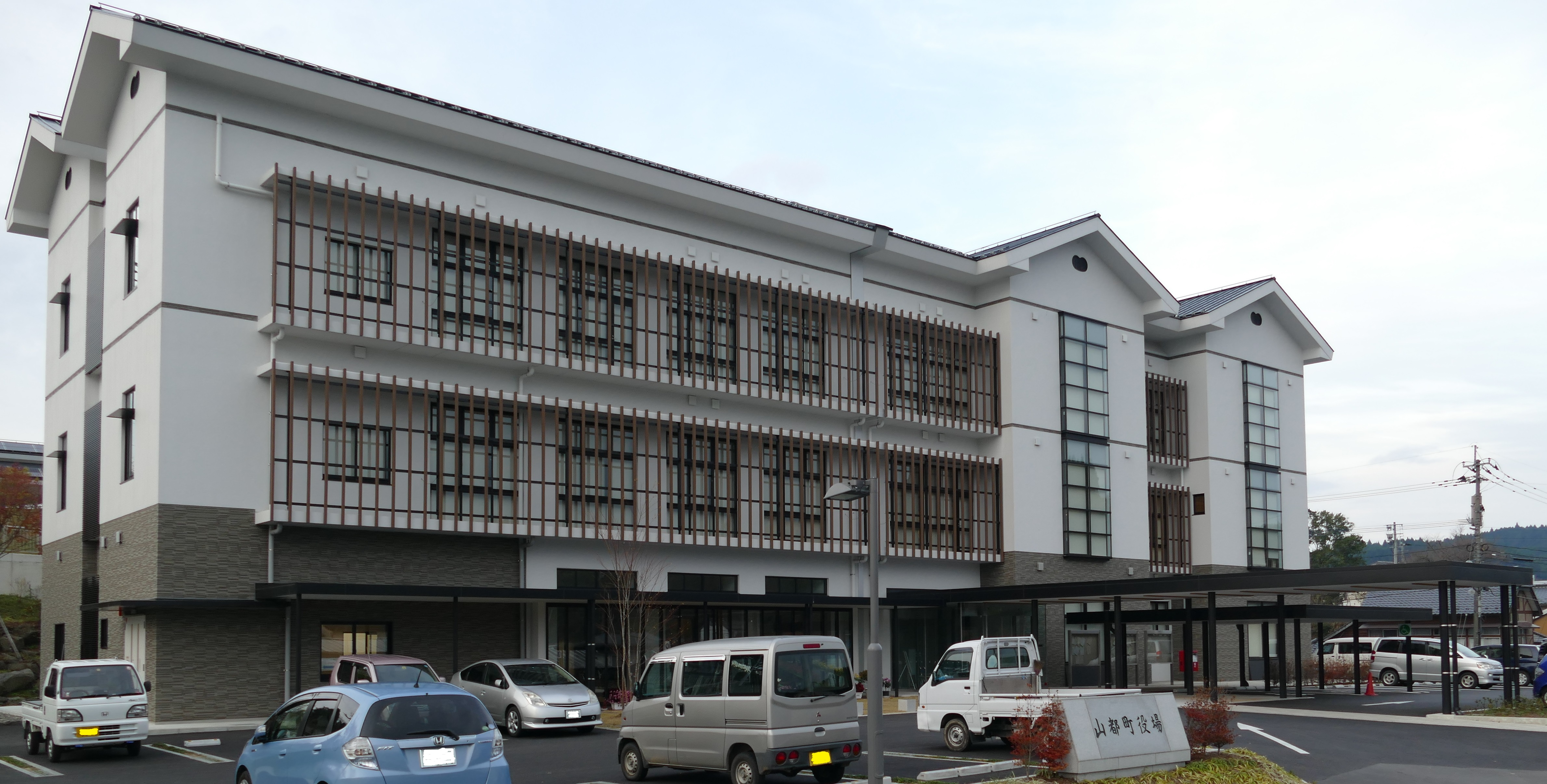
- Yamato Town Hall

- Flag Seal
- Location of Yamato in Kumamoto Prefecture

- Location in Japan
- Coordinates: 32°41′09″N 130°50′09″E
- Country: Japan
- Region: Kyushu
- Prefecture: Kumamoto
- District: Kamimashiki

Area
  - Total: 544.67 km^{2} (210.30 sq mi)

Population (July 31, 2024)
  - Total: 13,032
  - Density: 23.926/km^{2} (61.969/sq mi)
- Time zone: UTC+09:00 (JST)
- City hall address: 6 Hamamachi, Yamato-cho, Kamimashiki-gun, Kumamoto-ken 861-3592
- Website: Official website
- Symbols
- Bird: Blue-and-white flycatcher
- Flower: Erythronium japonicum
- Tree: Acer palmatum

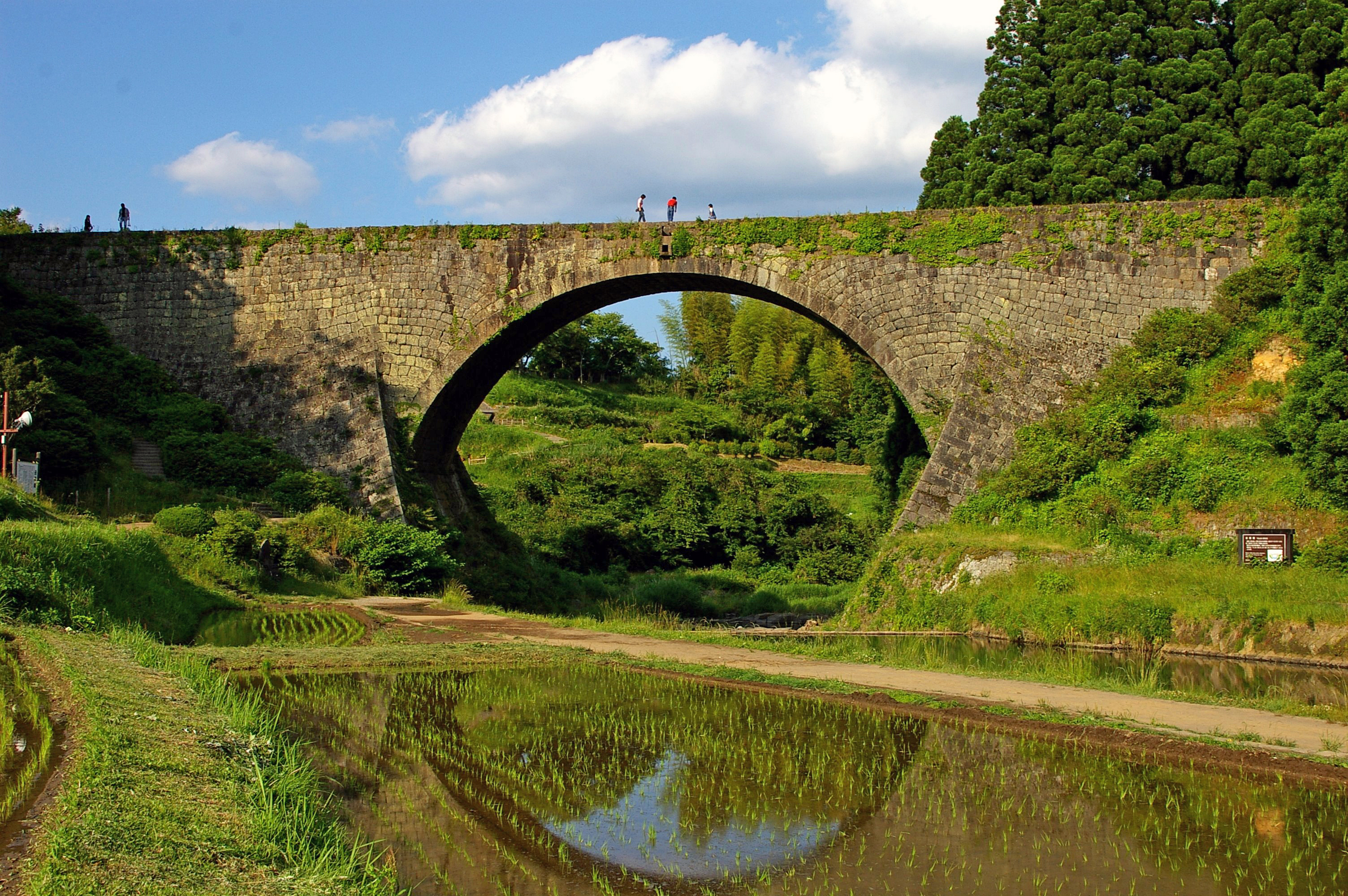
Tsūjun Bridge

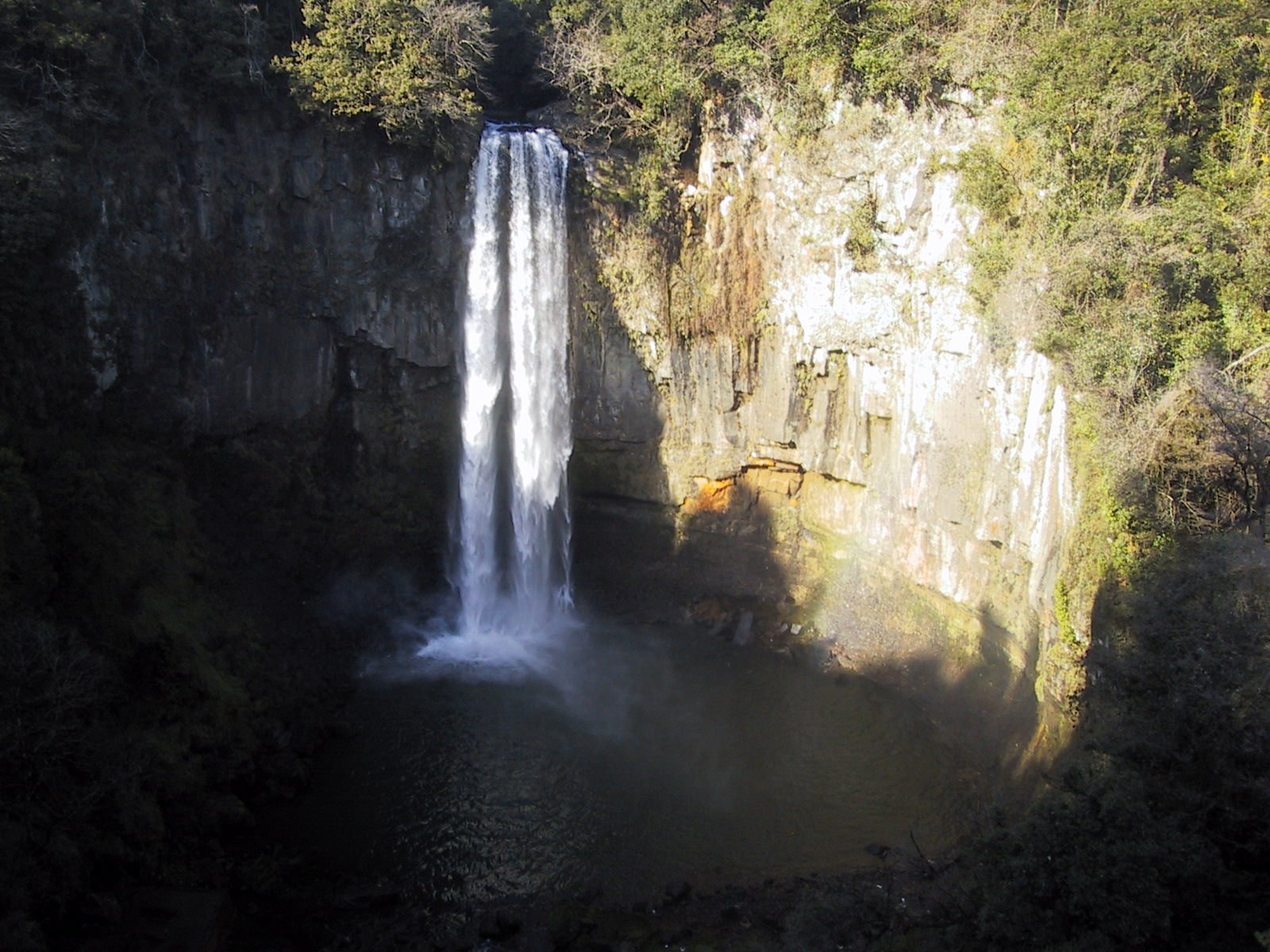
Gorogataki Waterfall

Yamato (山都町, Yamato-chō) is a town in Kamimashiki District, Kumamoto Prefecture, Japan. As of 31 July 2024, the town had an estimated population of 13,032 in 6274 households, and a population density of 24 persons per km^{2}. The total area of the town is 544.67 km^{2} (210.30 sq mi).

== Geography ==
Yamato is located in northeastern Kumamoto, bordering Miyazaki Prefecture. The northern part of the town is dominated by plateaus on the southern outer rim of Mount Aso, and borders Minamiaso village and Takamori town via a mountain pass at an elevation of about 1000 meters. The southern part of the town is in the Kyushu Mountains, with their steep terrain and a series of mountains over 1000 meters in altitude. Settlements have developed mainly along the valleys, and the population is distributed over a wide area.

=== Neighboring municipalities ===
Kumamoto Prefecture

- Mifune
- Minamiaso
- Misato
- Nishihara
- Takamori
- Yatsushiro

Miyazaki Prefecture

- Gokase
- Shiiba
- Takachiho

=== Climate ===
Yamato has a humid subtropical climate (Köppen Cfa) characterized by warm summers and cool winters with light to no snowfall. The average annual temperature in Yamato is 12.7 °C. The average annual rainfall is 1918 mm with September as the wettest month. The temperatures are highest on average in August, at around 23.3 °C, and lowest in January, at around 1.5 °C.

=== Demographics ===
Per Japanese census data, the population of Yamato is as shown below

Historical population
Year	Pop.	±%
1940	32,108	—
1950	40,559	+26.3%
1960	40,771	+0.5%
1970	30,607	−24.9%
1980	26,336	−14.0%
1990	23,503	−10.8%
2000	20,333	−13.5%
2010	16,981	−16.5%
2020	13,503	−20.5%

== History ==
The area of Yamato was part of ancient Higo Province, During the Edo Period it was part of the holdings of Kumamoto Domain. After the Meiji restoration, the town of Mamihara and villages of Sugao, Kashiwa, Komine and Hamamachi, Shimoyabe, Shiraito, Mitake, Nakajima, Naregawa, and Asahi were established with the creation of the modern municipalities system on April 1, 1889. Hamamachi was raised to town status on April 1, 1912. On February 1, 1955, Hamamachi, Shimoyabe, Shiraito, and Mitake merged to form the town of Yabe. In 1956 Asahi and Komine merged to form the village of Seiwa and Mamihara, Sugao, and Kashiwa merged to form the town of Soyo. In 1957, Nakajima and Naregawa were annexed by the town of Yabe. The town of Yamato was formed on February 11, 2005, from the merger of the municipalities of Yabe and Seiwa with the town of Soyō from Aso District.

== Government ==
Yamato has a mayor-council form of government with a directly elected mayor and a unicameral town council of 14 members. Yamato, collectively with the other municipalities of Kamimashiki District contributes two members to the Kumamoto Prefectural Assembly. In terms of national politics, the town is part of the Kumamoto 3rd district of the lower house of the Diet of Japan.

== Economy ==
Agriculture is the town's main industry, and it has the most organic farms in Japan. The town is located in a highland climate, so it is characterized by the cultivation of highland vegetables

== Education ==
Yamato has three public elementary schools and three public junior high schools operated by the town government, and one public high schools operated by the Kumamoto Prefectural Board of Education. There is also one private high school.

== Transportation ==
=== Railways ===
Yamato does not have any passenger railway service. The nearest station is Takamori Station on the Minamiaso Railway Takamori Line. The nearest JR Kyushu station is Matsubase Station in Uki, on the Kagoshima Main Line.

=== Highways ===
- Kyushu Chūō Expressway
- National Route 218
- National Route 265
- National Route 325
- National Route 445

== Local attractions ==
- Tsūjun Bridge, Edo Period bridge; National Treasure

== Notable people from Yamato ==
- Yasunosuke Futa - architect
- Tomiko Van - Vocalist of Do As Infinity, singer and occasional actress
- Yasuhiro Yamashita - judoka
