= Shōtaisan Prefectural Natural Park =

Natural park of Kumamoto prefecture, Japan

- 小岱山県立自然公園
- Interactive map of Shōtaisan Prefectural Natural Park
- Location: Kumamoto Prefecture, Japan
- Area: 45.96 km^{2} (17.75 sq mi)
- Established: 1 April 1955

Shōtaisan Prefectural Natural Park (小岱山県立自然公園, Shōtaisan kenritsu shizen kōen) is a Prefectural Natural Park in northwest Kumamoto Prefecture, Japan. Established in 1955, the park spans the municipalities of Arao, Nankan, and Tamana. The park derives its name from Mount Shōtai and encompasses Akada pond.

== See also ==
- National Parks of Japan
