= Kamimashiki District, Kumamoto =

District in Kumamoto prefecture, Japan

Coordinates: 32.734°N 130.860°E

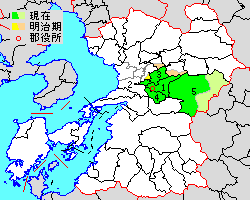
Location of Kamimashiki District in Kumamoto Prefecture

Kamimashiki (上益城郡, Kamimashiki-gun) is a district located in Kumamoto Prefecture, Japan.

As of the Yamato merger (but with 2003 population statistics), the district had an estimated population of 90,315 and a density of 115.2 persons per square kilometer. The total area is 784.03 km^{2}.

== Towns and villages ==
- Kashima
- Kōsa
- Mashiki
- Mifune
- Yamato

== Mergers ==
- On February 11, 2005, the municipalities of Yabe and Seiwa merged with the town of Soyō from Aso District to form the new town of Yamato.
