= Itsuki Gokanoshō Prefectural Natural Park =

Prefectural Natural Park in Kumamoto Prefecture, Japan

- 五木五家荘県立自然公園
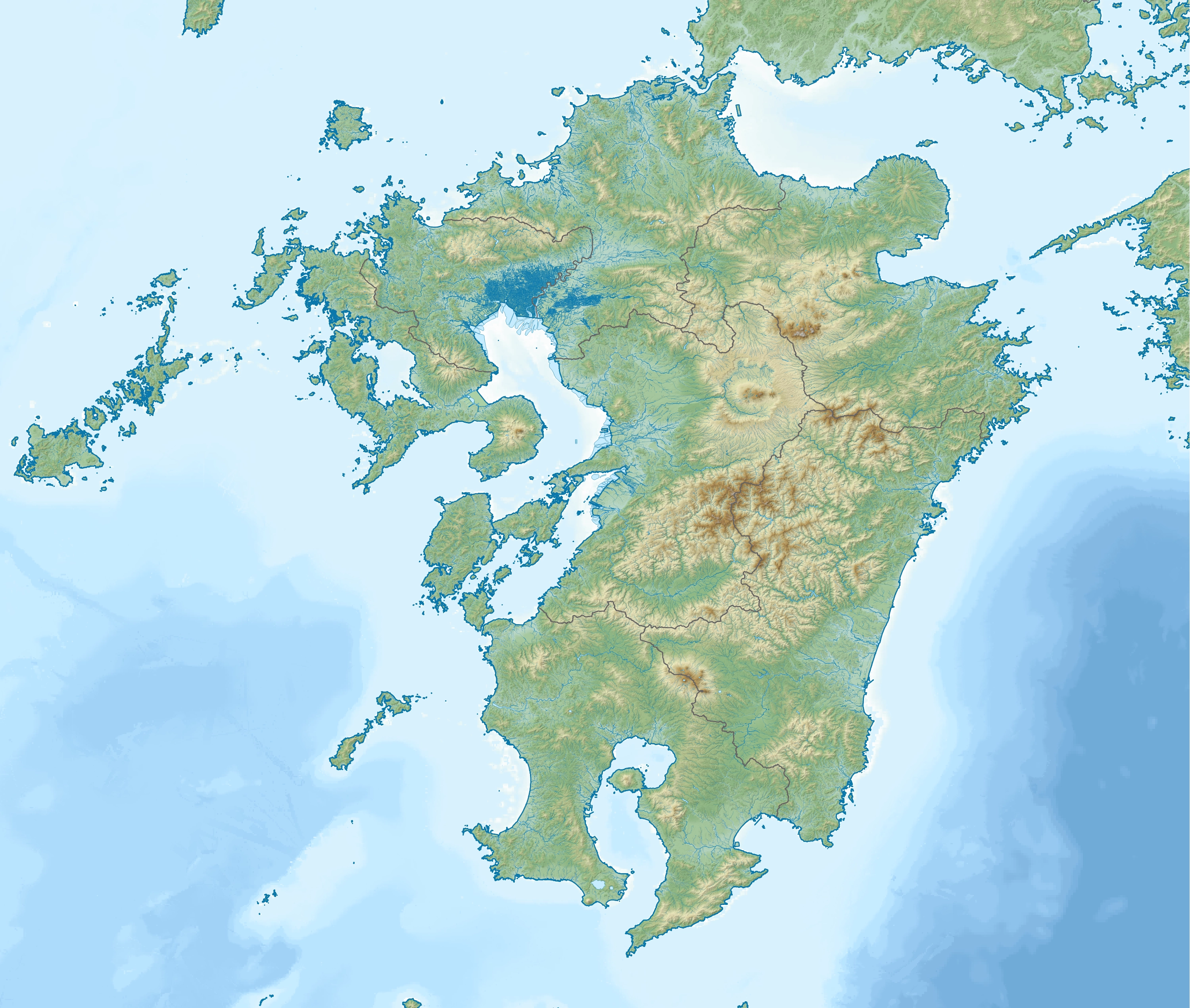
- Location within Kumamoto Prefecture Location within Kyushu Location within Japan
- Location: Kumamoto Prefecture, Japan
- Coordinates: 32.47°N 130.87°E
- Area: 253.58 km^{2} (97.91 sq mi)
- Established: 1 September 1967

Itsuki Gokanoshō Prefectural Natural Park (五木五家荘県立自然公園, Itsuki Gokanoshō kenritsu shizen kōen) is a Prefectural Natural Park in eastern Kumamoto Prefecture, Japan. Established in 1967, the park spans the municipalities of Hikawa, Itsuki, Misato, Sagara, Yamae, and Yatsushiro.

== See also ==
- National Parks of Japan
