= Nabegataki Falls =

Coordinates: 33.1376°N 131.0350°E

The Nabegataki Falls is a waterfall located in Oguni, Aso District, Japan, on the border between Kumamoto and Ōita Prefectures. The waterfall is 9m tall with a width of 20m.
