= Okukuma Prefectural Natural Park =

Natural park in Kumamoto Prefecture, Japan

- 奥球磨県立自然公園
- Interactive map of Okukuma Prefectural Natural Park
- Location: Kumamoto Prefecture, Japan
- Area: 127.38 km^{2} (49.18 sq mi)
- Established: 1 April 1955

Okukuma Prefectural Natural Park (奥球磨県立自然公園, Okukuma kenritsu shizen kōen) is a Prefectural Natural Park in southeast Kumamoto Prefecture, Japan. Established in 1955, the park spans the municipalities of Mizukami, Taragi, and Yunomae.

== See also ==
- National Parks of Japan
