= Ashikita District, Kumamoto =

District of Japan

Coordinates: 32.283457°N 130.531258°E

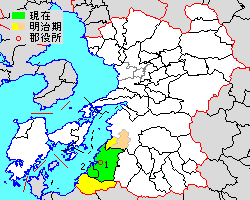
Location of Ashikita District in Kumamoto Prefecture

Ashikita (葦北郡, Ashikita-gun) is a district located in Kumamoto Prefecture, Japan.

As of 2003, the district has an estimated population of 27,264 and a density of 101.94 persons per square kilometer. The total area is 267.45 km^{2}.

== Towns and villages ==
- Ashikita
- Tsunagi

== Merger ==
- On January 1, 2005, the town of Tanoura merged into the expanded town of Ashikita.
