= Hakusui, Kumamoto =

Dissolved municipality in Kumamoto prefecture, Japan

Hakusui 白水村
- Village (former)
- Location in Kumamoto Prefecture Hakusui (Japan)
- Country: Japan
- Prefecture: Kumamoto
- Dissolved: February 13, 2005

Area
  - Total: 47.89 km^{2} (18.49 sq mi)

Population (2003)
  - Total: 4,523
  - Density: 94.45/km^{2} (244.6/sq mi)
- Time zone: UTC+9 (JST)

Hakusui (白水村, Hakusui-mura) was a village located in Aso District, Kumamoto Prefecture, Japan.

As of 2003, the village had an estimated population of 4,523 and a population density of 94.45 persons per km^{2}. The total area was 47.89 km^{2}.

On February 13, 2005, Hakusui, along with the villages of Chōyō and Kugino (all from Aso District), was merged to create the village of Minamiaso and no longer exists as an independent municipality.
