= Tanoura, Kumamoto =

Dissolved municipality in Kumamoto prefecture, Japan

Tanoura (田浦町, Tanoura-machi) was a town located in Ashikita District, Kumamoto Prefecture, Japan.

As of 2003, the town had an estimated population of 5,136 and a density of 156.78 persons per km^{2}. The total area was 32.76 km^{2}.

On January 1, 2005, Tanoura was merged into the expanded town of Ashikita and no longer exists as an independent municipality.
