= Tsunagi, Kumamoto =

Tsunagi 津奈木町
- Town
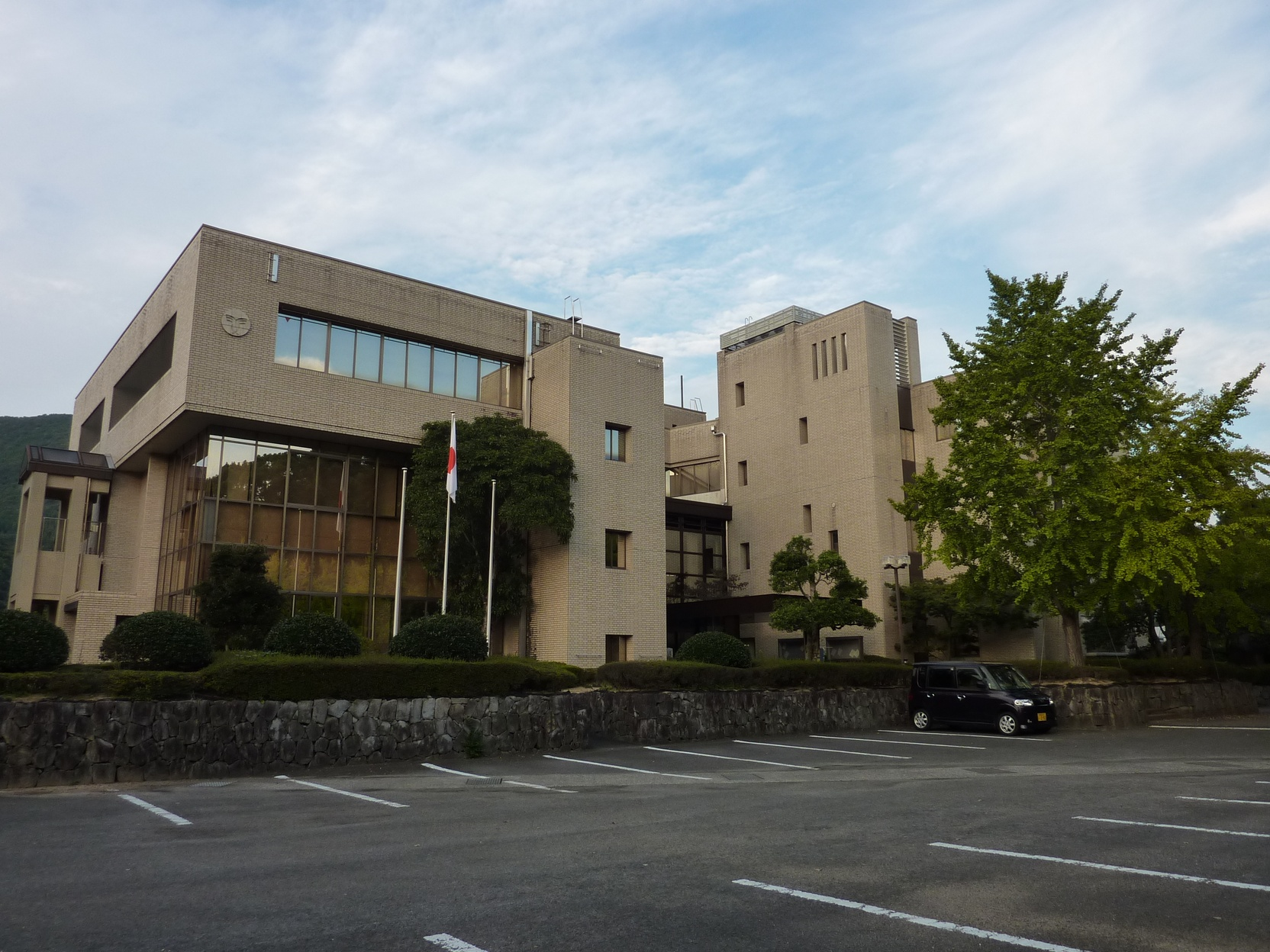
- Tsunagi Town Hall

- Flag Chapter
- Location of Tsunagi in Kumamoto Prefecture

- Location in Japan
- Coordinates: 32°14′02″N 130°26′23″E
- Country: Japan
- Region: Kyushu
- Prefecture: Kuamamoto
- District: Ashikita

Area
  - Total: 34.08 km^{2} (13.16 sq mi)

Population (September 30, 2024)
  - Total: 4,131
  - Density: 121.2/km^{2} (313.9/sq mi)
- Time zone: UTC+09:00 (JST)
- City hall address: 2123 Otsunagi, Tsunagi-machi, Ashikita-gun, Kumamoto-ken 869-5692
- Website: Official website
- Symbols
- Bird: Copper Pheasant
- Flower: Farfugium japonicum
- Tree: Cryptomeria japonica

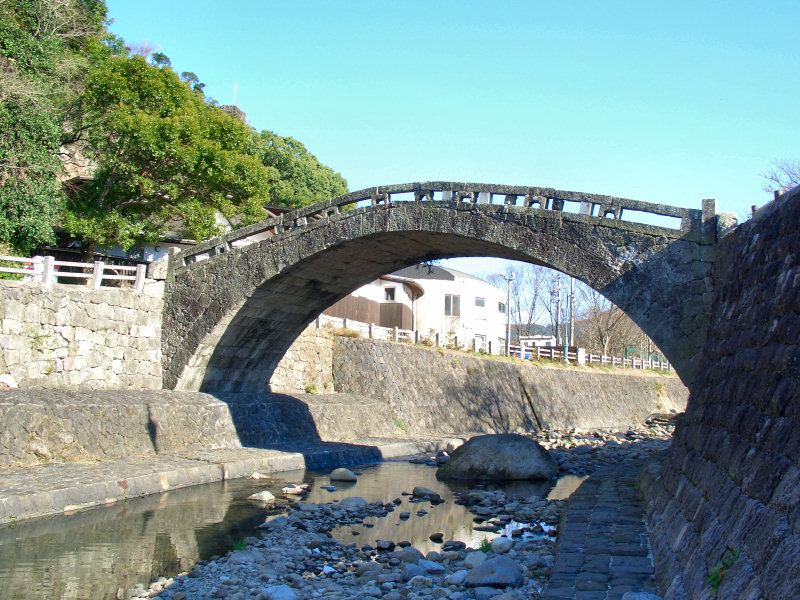
Chohangan Megane-bashi

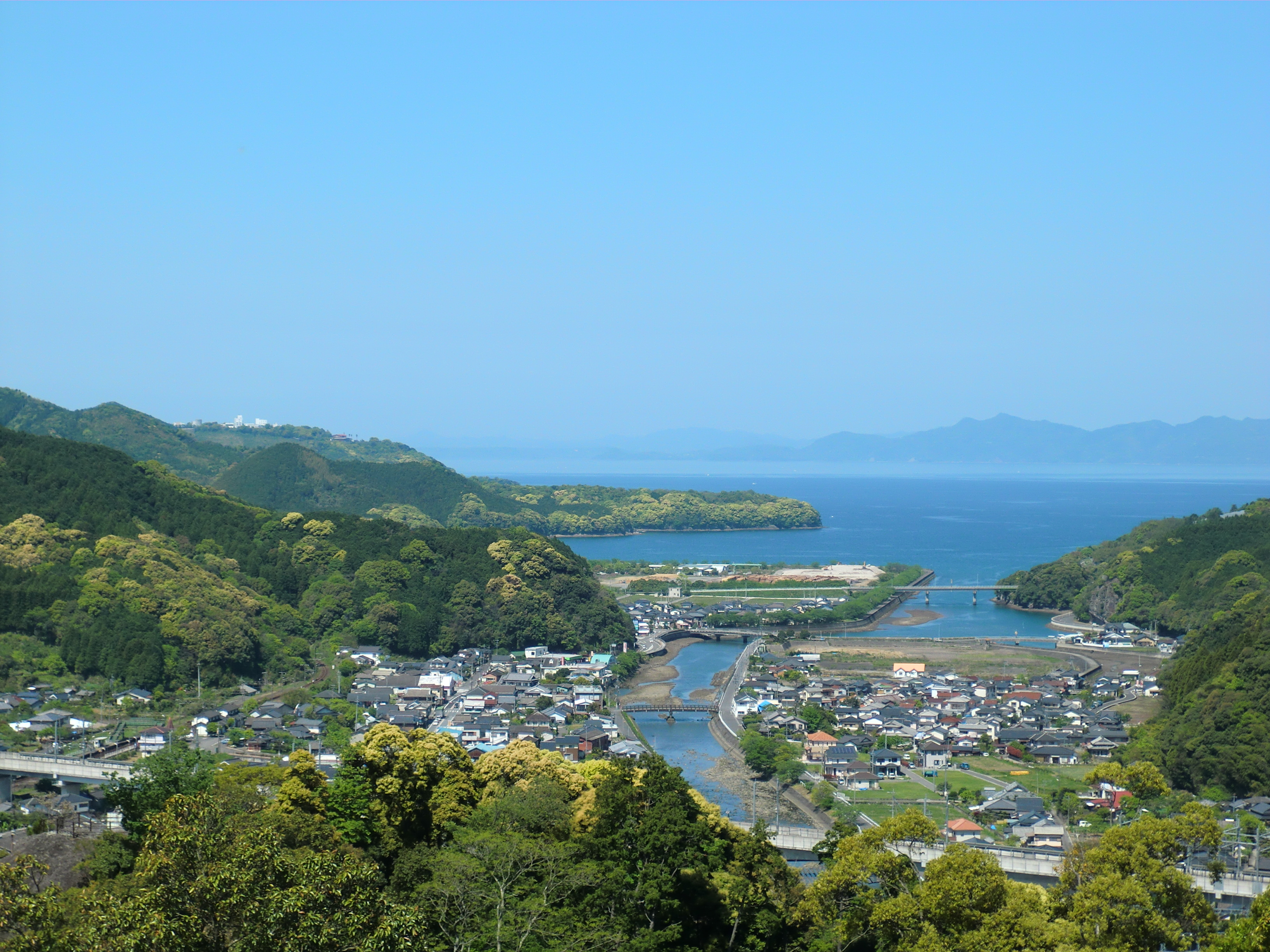
Panorama of Tsunagi

Tsunagi (津奈木町, Tsunagi-machi) is a town located in Ashikita District, Kumamoto Prefecture, Japan. As of 30 September 2024, the town had an estimated population of 4,131 in 1,848 households, and a population density of 120 persons per km^{2}. The total area of the town is 34.08 km^{2} (13.16 sq mi).

== Geography ==
Tsunagi is located in far southwestern Kumamoto Prefecture bordering the Yatsushiro Sea.

=== Neighboring municipalities ===
Kumamoto Prefecture

- Ashikita
- Minamata

=== Climate ===
Tsunagi has a humid subtropical climate (Köppen Cfa) characterized by warm summers and cool winters with light to no snowfall. The average annual temperature in Tsunagi is 16.2 °C. The average annual rainfall is 2213 mm with September as the wettest month. The temperatures are highest on average in August, at around 26.4 °C, and lowest in January, at around 5.9 °C.

=== Demographics ===
Per Japanese census data, the population of Tsunagi is as shown below

Historical population
Year	Pop.	±%
1940	6,653	—
1950	9,303	+39.8%
1960	8,406	−9.6%
1970	6,355	−24.4%
1980	6,053	−4.8%
1990	5,783	−4.5%
2000	5,741	−0.7%
2010	5,062	−11.8%
2020	4,254	−16.0%

== History ==
The area of Tsunagi was part of ancient Higo Province. The town name "Tsunaki" is said to have originated from the legend that when Emperor Keikō conquered Kyushu, he "tied" his ships here. During the Edo Period it was part of the holdings of Kumamoto Domain. After the Meiji restoration, the village of Tsunagi was established in Ashikita District, Kumamoto with the creation of the modern municipalities system on April 1, 1889. On April, 1963, Tsunagi was elevated to town status.

Residents of Tsunagi were among those affected by Minamata disease. There is also a tradition of biwa-playing in Tsunagi.

== Government ==
Tsunagi has a mayor-council form of government with a directly elected mayor and a unicameral city council of ten members. Tsunagi, together with the town of Ashikita contributes one member to the Kumamoto Prefectural Assembly. In terms of national politics, the town is part of the Kumamoto 4th district of the lower house of the Diet of Japan.

== Economy ==
The economy of Tsunagi is mainly agriculture and commercial fishing. The Tsunagi Industrial Park and Kuratani Industrial Park have been developed within the town, and efforts are being made to attract manufacturing businesses.

== Education ==
Tsunagi has one public elementary school and one public junior high school operated by the town government. The town does not have a high school.

== Transportation ==
=== Railways ===
Hisatsu Orange Railway

- Tsunagi

=== Highways ===
- Minamikyushu Expressway
- National Route 3

== Notable people from Tsunagi ==
- Takafumi Iwasaki, musician

== See also ==
- 2020 Kyushu floods
