= Aso District, Kumamoto =

District in Kumamoto Prefecture, Japan

Coordinates: 32.8728°N 131.0885°E

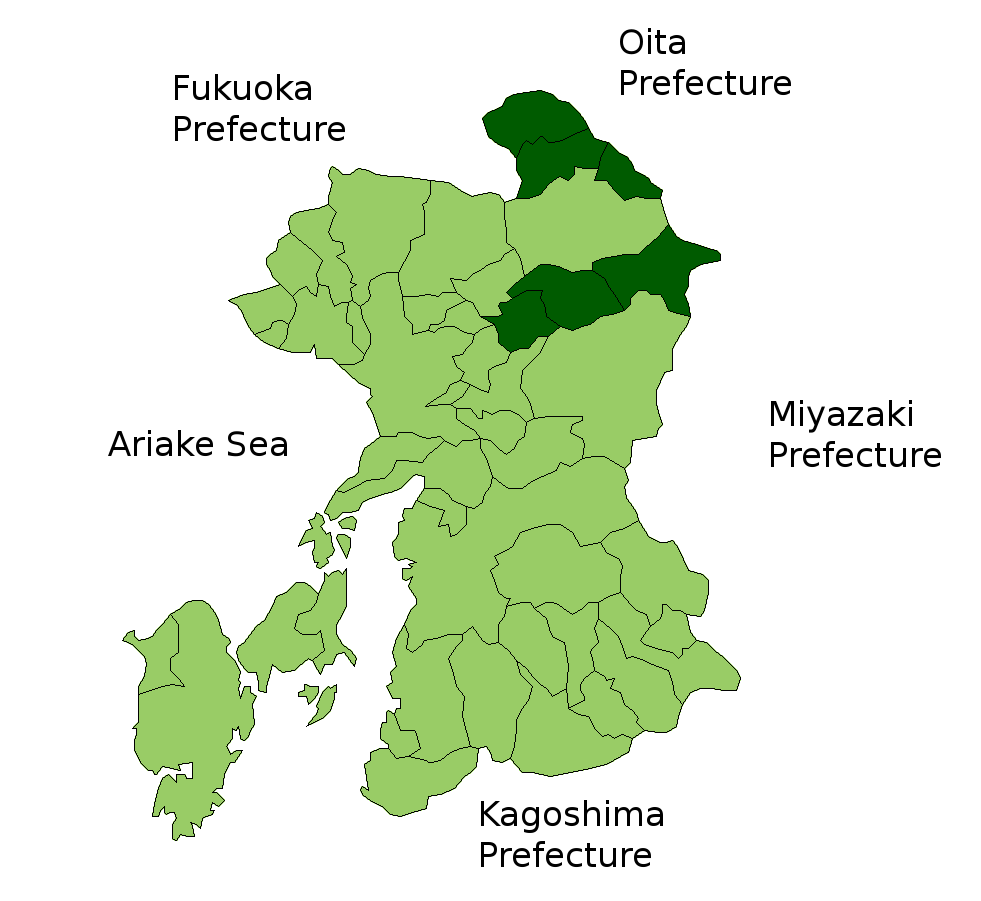
Location of Aso District in Kumamoto Prefecture

Aso (阿蘇郡, Aso-gun) is a district located in Kumamoto Prefecture, Japan. The total area is 703.01 km^{2}.

As of 2024, the population was 32,882. The Aso clan comes from it.

== Towns and villages ==
- Minamioguni
- Oguni
- Takamori
- Minamiaso
- Nishihara
- Ubuyama

== Mergers ==
- On February 11, 2005, the old town of Aso absorbed the town of Ichinomiya, and the village of Namino to become the new city of Aso.
- On February 11, 2005, the town of Soyō merged with the town of Yabe, and the village of Seiwa, both from Kamimashiki District, to form the new town of Yamato (in Kamimashiki District).
- On February 13, 2005, the villages of Chōyō, Hakusui and Kugino merged to form the new village of Minamiaso.
