= Tsūjun Bridge =

Aqueduct bridge in Japan

Coordinates: 32°40′54″N 130°59′38″E

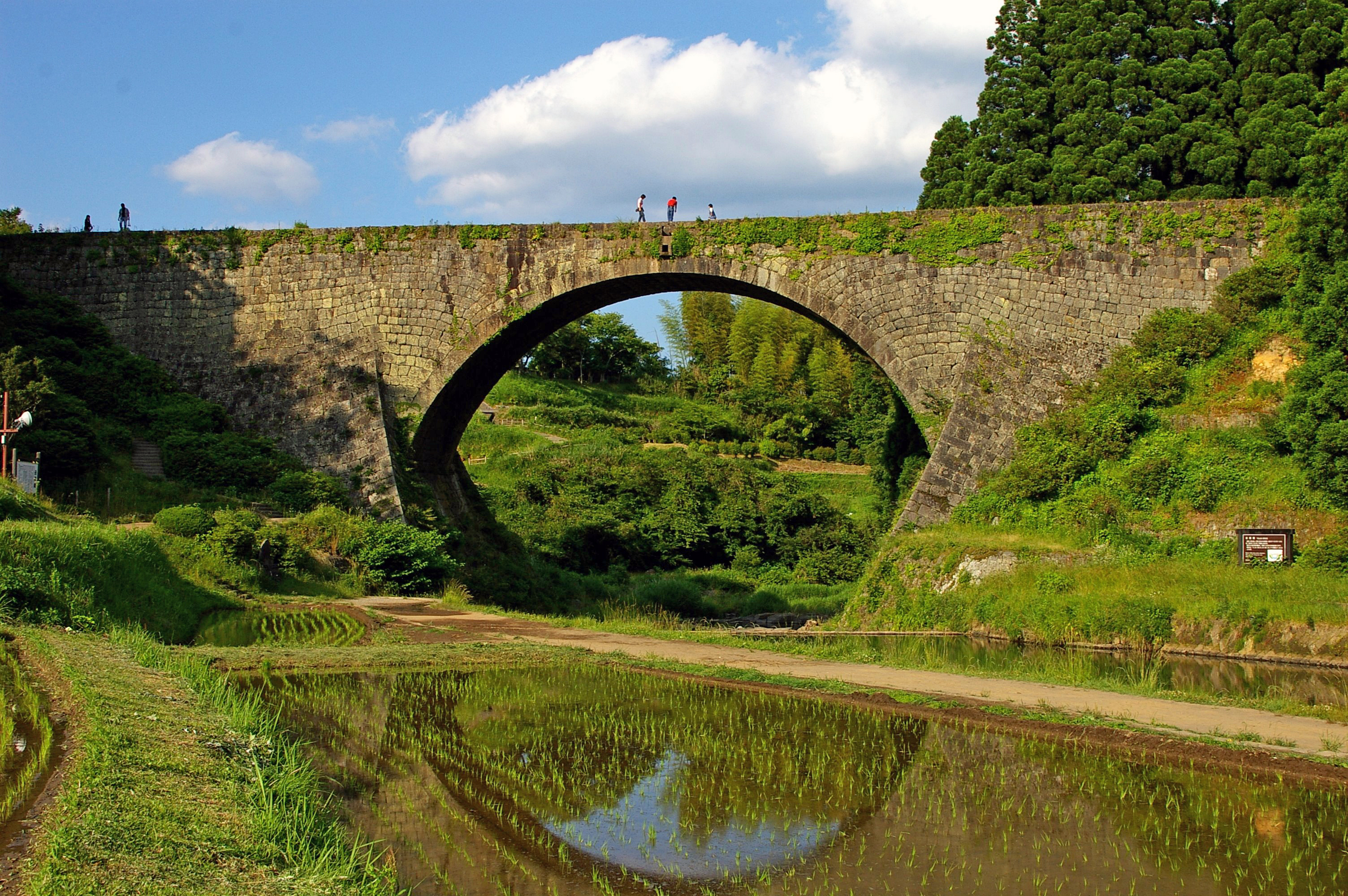
Tsujun Bridge in 2007.Water flows from left to right

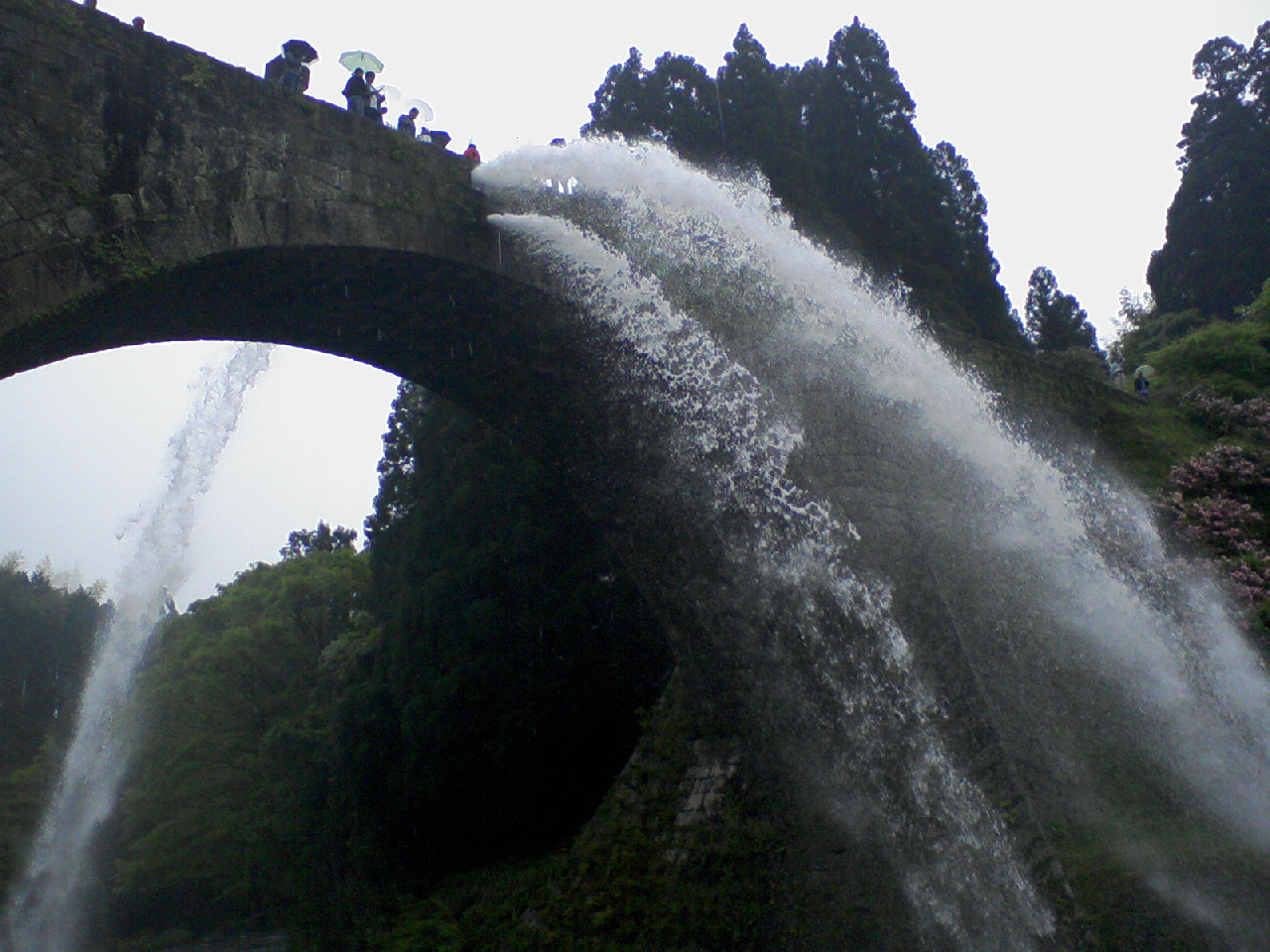
Tsūjun Bridge discharges water and accumulated silt in May 2007.

Tsūjun Bridge (通潤橋 -kyō) is an aqueduct in Yamato, Kumamoto, Japan. It is an arch bridge completed in 1854 and is 84.0m long. The arch spans 27.3m. It is the largest stone aqueduct in Japan.

The Japanese Agency for Cultural Affairs has designated the bridge an National Treasure.

== History and technology ==
This bridge exemplifies the high level of stone bridge technology in existence at the time of its construction. Yasunosuke Futa (1801–1873), who was the head of the then Yabe village, planned it and, after obtaining funding, succeeded in building the bridge in 1854 with the help of the group of 41 stone technicians and many farmers. Its purpose was to let water flow into a higher area (Shiroito Plateau) for farming. After placing wooden frames, stones were placed on the frames and three stone aqueducts were made. After that, the wooden frames were removed. Because the aqueducts were lower than the upper part of the waterway by 6 metres (20 ft), a reversed siphon mechanism works when water flows through the aqueducts. The stone aqueducts were made watertight with mortar. The bridge was completed in 1854.

Because the aqueduct is lower than the upstream and downstream waterways, sand and mud may accumulate in the aqueduct. To clean the accumulated dirt, the bridge is able to occasionally release water (and dirt) into the river below. This is mostly done in the farmers' off-season.

== See also ==
- History of Kumamoto Prefecture
