= Kumamoto Prefecture =

Prefecture of Japan

Kumamoto Prefecture 熊本県
- Prefecture

Japanese transcription(s)
  - Japanese: 熊本県
  - Rōmaji: Kumamoto-ken
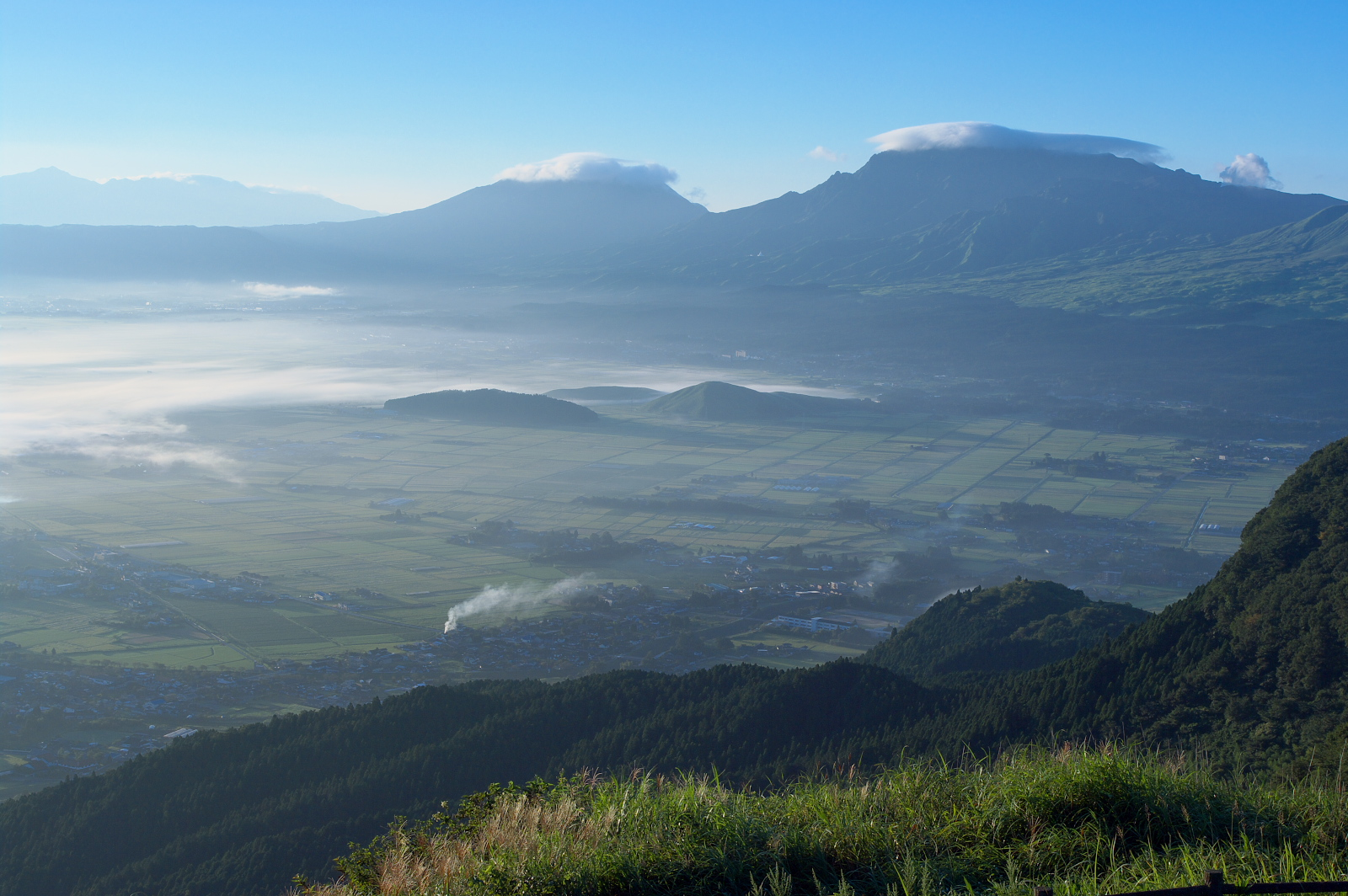
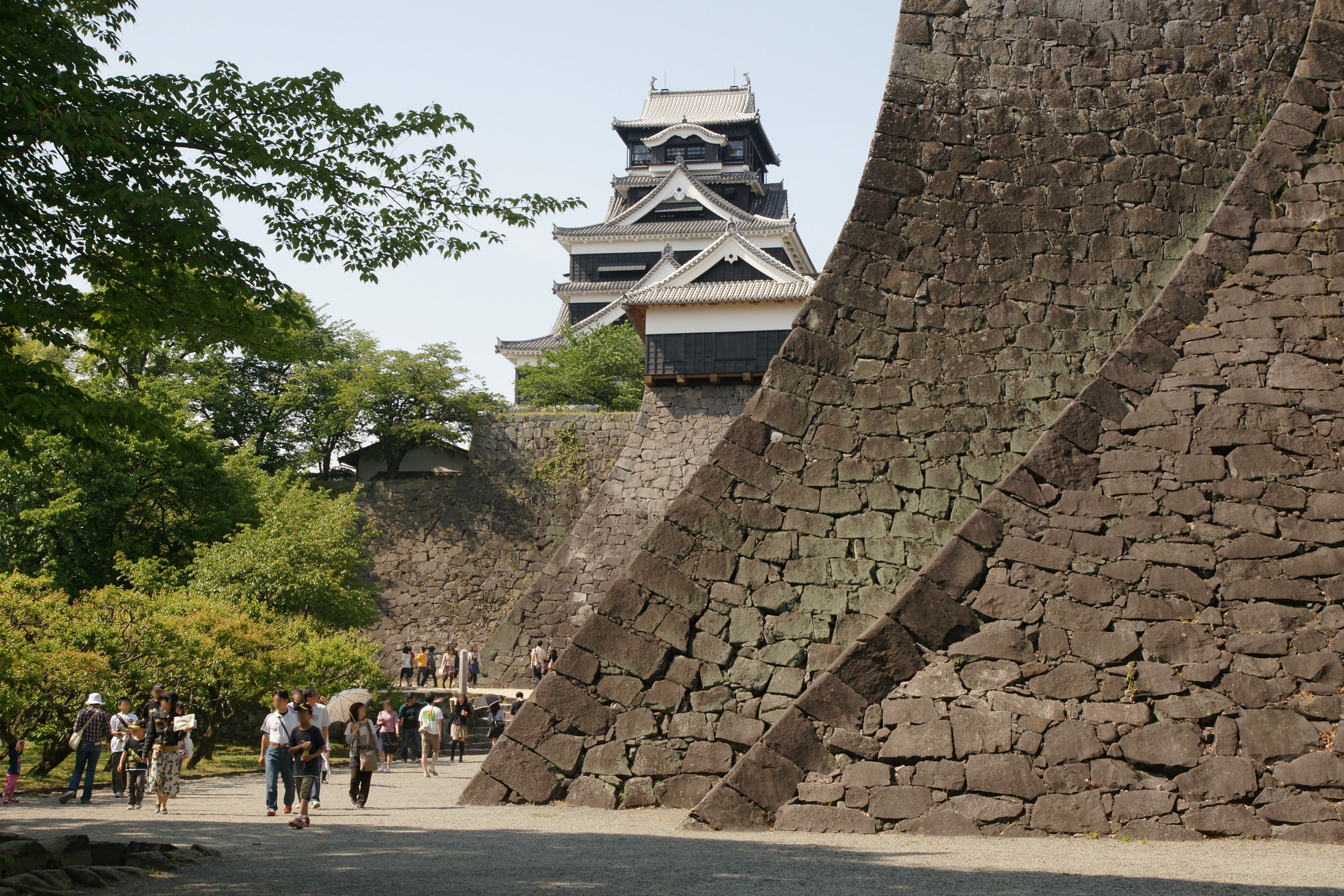
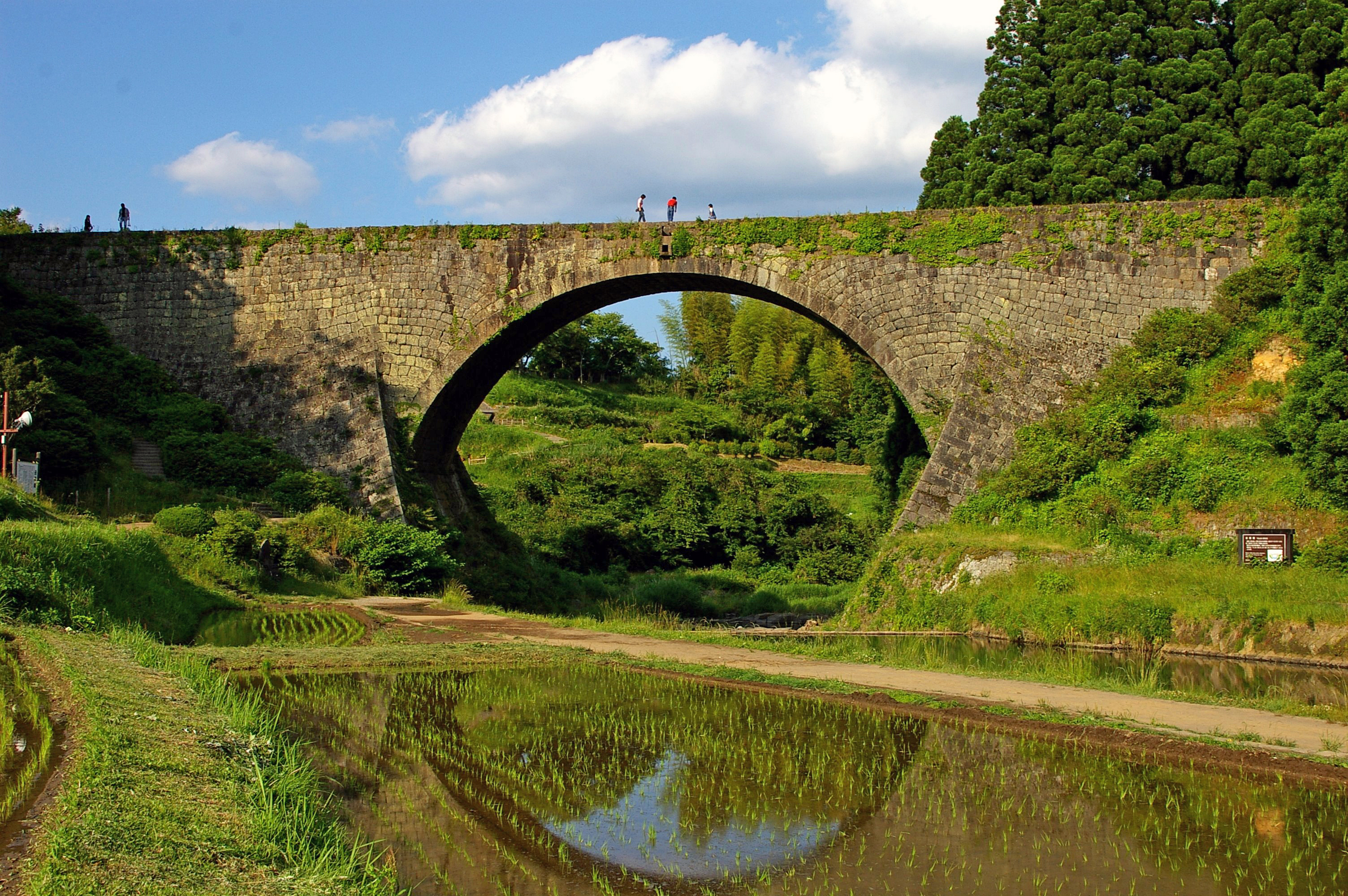
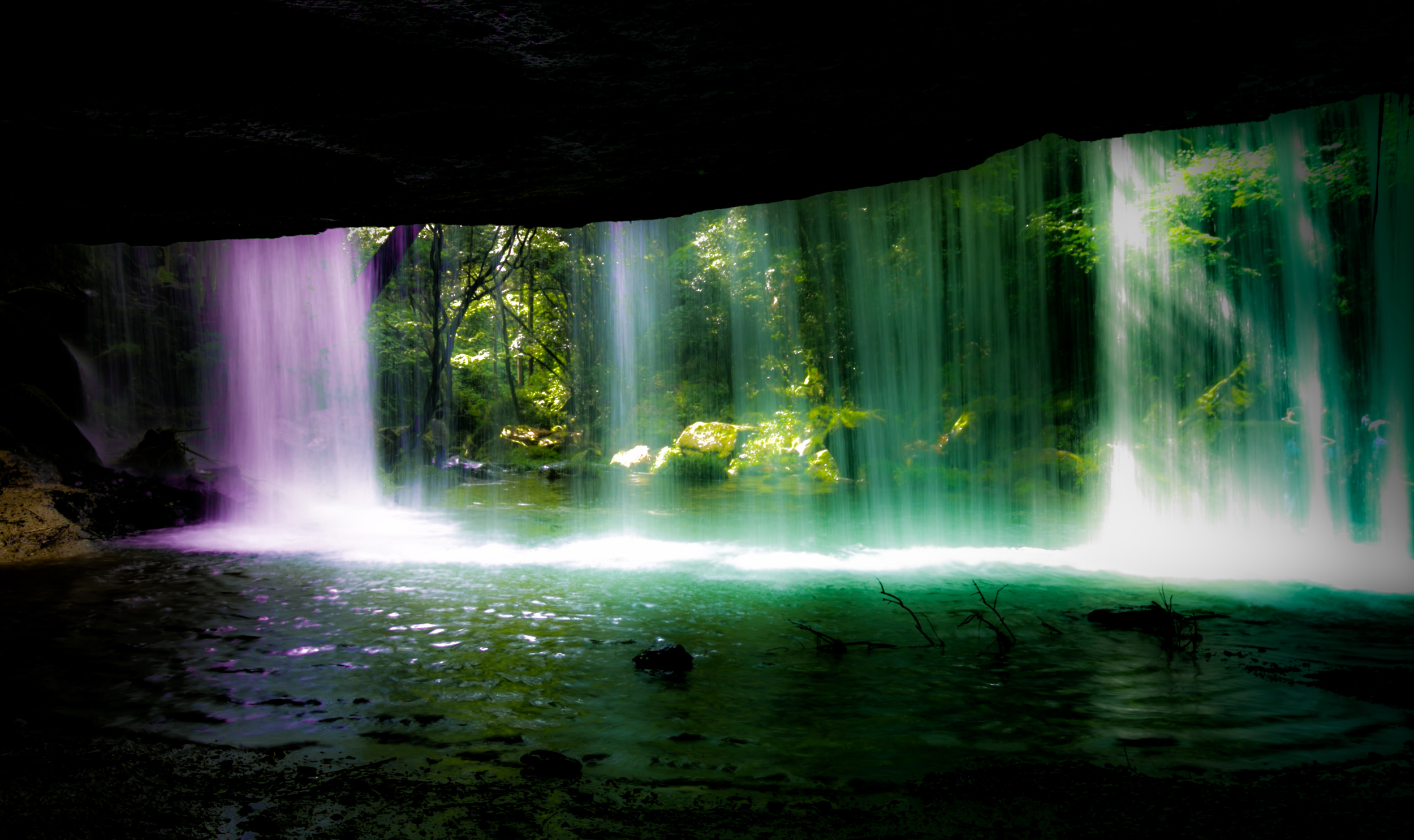
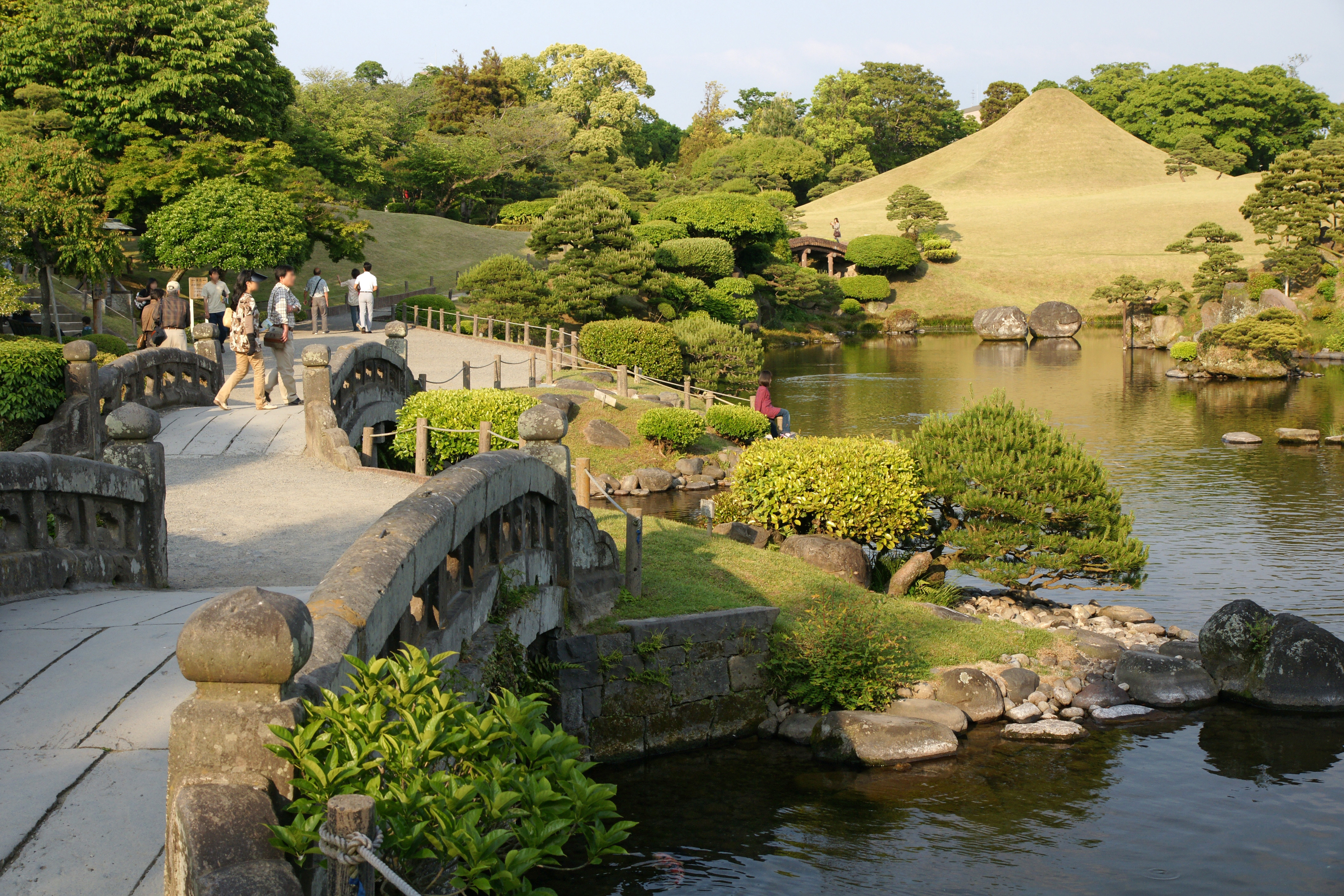
- Mount Aso and Aso Caldera Kumamoto Castle Tsūjun Aqueduct Nabegataki Falls Suizen-ji Jōju-en

- Flag Symbol
- Anthem: Kumamoto kenmin no uta
- Coordinates: 32.79°N 130.74°E
- Country: Japan
- Region: Kyushu
- Island: Kyushu
- Capital: Kumamoto
- Subdivisions: Districts: 9, Municipalities: 45

Government
  - Governor: Takashi Kimura

Area
  - Total: 7,409.48 km^{2} (2,860.82 sq mi)
  - Rank: 15th

Population (1 October 2025)
  - Total: 1,683,115
  - Rank: 23rd
  - Density: 227.157/km^{2} (588.334/sq mi)

GDP
  - Total: JP¥6,565 billion US$48.5 billion (2022)
- ISO 3166 code: JP-43
- Website: www.pref.kumamoto.jp
- Symbols
- Bird: Eurasian skylark (Alauda arvensis)
- Flower: Gentian (Gentiana scabra var. buergeri)
- Tree: Camphor tree (Cinnamomum camphora)

Kumamoto Prefecture (熊本県, Kumamoto-ken; Japanese pronunciation: [kɯ̈̀.mä́.mó̞.tó̞(.kè̞ɴ̀)]) is a prefecture of Japan located on the island of Kyūshū. Kumamoto Prefecture has a population of 1,683,115 (as of 1 October 2025) and has a geographic area of 7,409 square kilometres (2,861 sq mi). Kumamoto Prefecture borders Fukuoka Prefecture to the north, Ōita Prefecture to the northeast, Miyazaki Prefecture to the southeast, and Kagoshima Prefecture to the south.

Kumamoto is the capital and largest city of Kumamoto Prefecture, with other major cities including Yatsushiro, Amakusa, and Tamana. Kumamoto Prefecture is located in the center of Kyūshū on the coast of the Ariake Sea, across from Nagasaki Prefecture, with the mainland separated from the East China Sea by the Amakusa Archipelago. Kumamoto Prefecture is home to Mount Aso, the largest active volcano in Japan and among the largest in the world, with its peak 1,592 metres (5,223 ft) above sea level.

== History ==
Historically, the area was called Higo Province; the province was renamed Kumamoto during the Meiji Restoration. The creation of prefectures was part of the abolition of the feudal system. The current Japanese orthography for Kumamoto literally means "bear root/origin," or "origin of the bear." However, Man'yōgana-like phonetic transcriptions based on the kanji for "a ball, a sphere" (球 /kɯ~kʲɯː/) and "to polish, to grind, to brush (one's teeth)" (磨 /ma/) are used for the names of the Kuma River (球磨川) and Kuma District (球磨郡). The Kuma element also appears in the ancient Kumaso.

== Geography ==
Map of Kumamoto Prefecture showing municipal boundaries Government Ordinance Designated City City Town Village

Kumamoto Prefecture is in the center of Kyushu, the southernmost of the four major Japanese islands. It is bordered by the Ariake inland sea and the Amakusa archipelago to the west, Fukuoka Prefecture and Ōita Prefecture to the north, Miyazaki Prefecture to the east, and Kagoshima Prefecture to the south.

Mount Aso (1,592 m (5,223 ft)), an extensive active volcano, is in the east of Kumamoto Prefecture. This volcano is located at the centre of the Aso caldera.

As of 31 March 2019, 21% of the total land area of the prefecture was designated as natural parks: the Aso Kujū and Unzen-Amakusa National Parks; Kyūshū Chūō Sanchi and Yaba-Hita-Hikosan Quasi-National Parks; and Ashikita Kaigan, Itsuki Gokanoshō, Kinpōzan, Misumi-Ōyano Umibe, Okukuma, Shōtaisan, and Yabe Shūhen Prefectural Natural Parks.

=== Cities ===
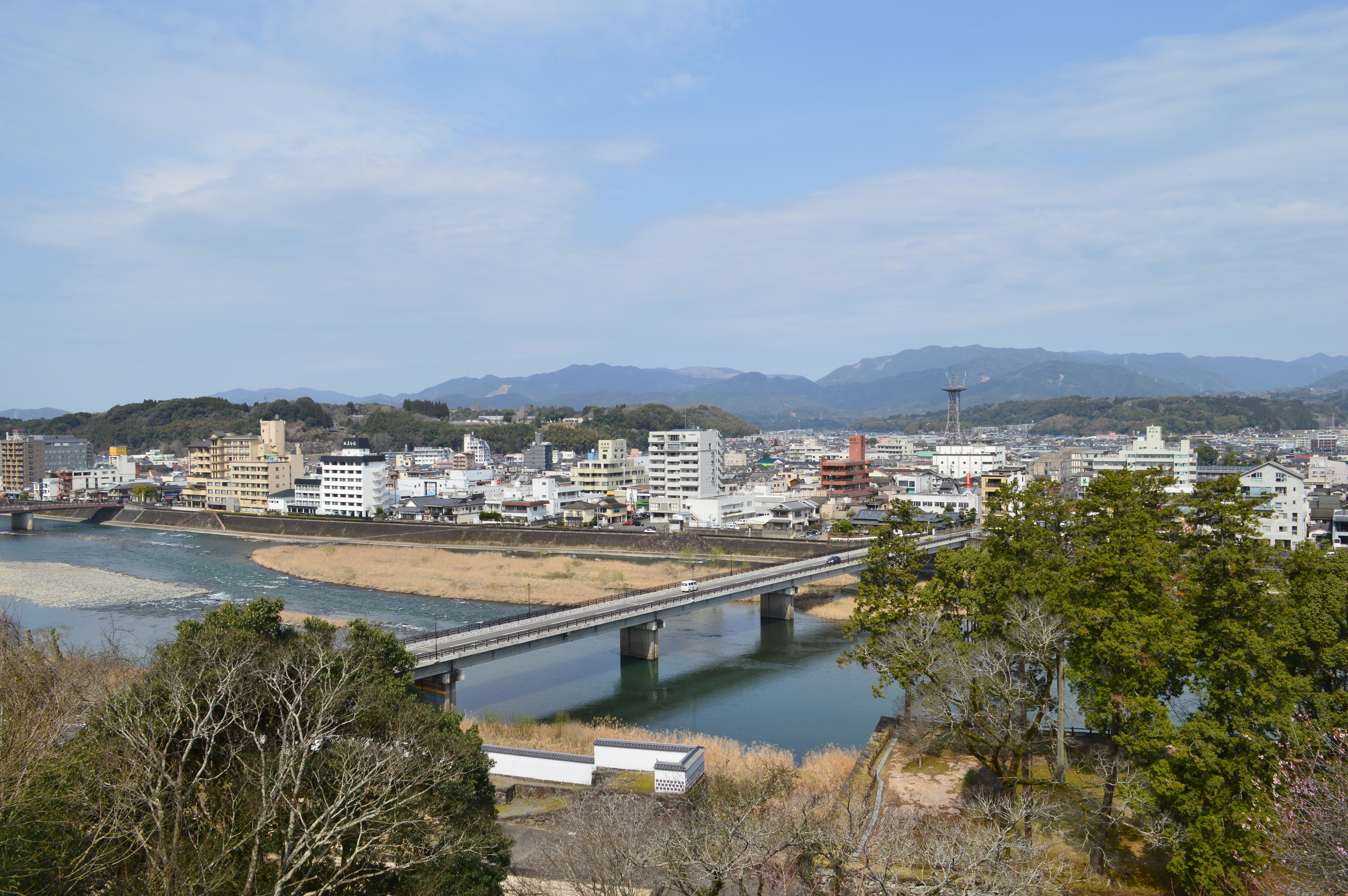
Hitoyoshi

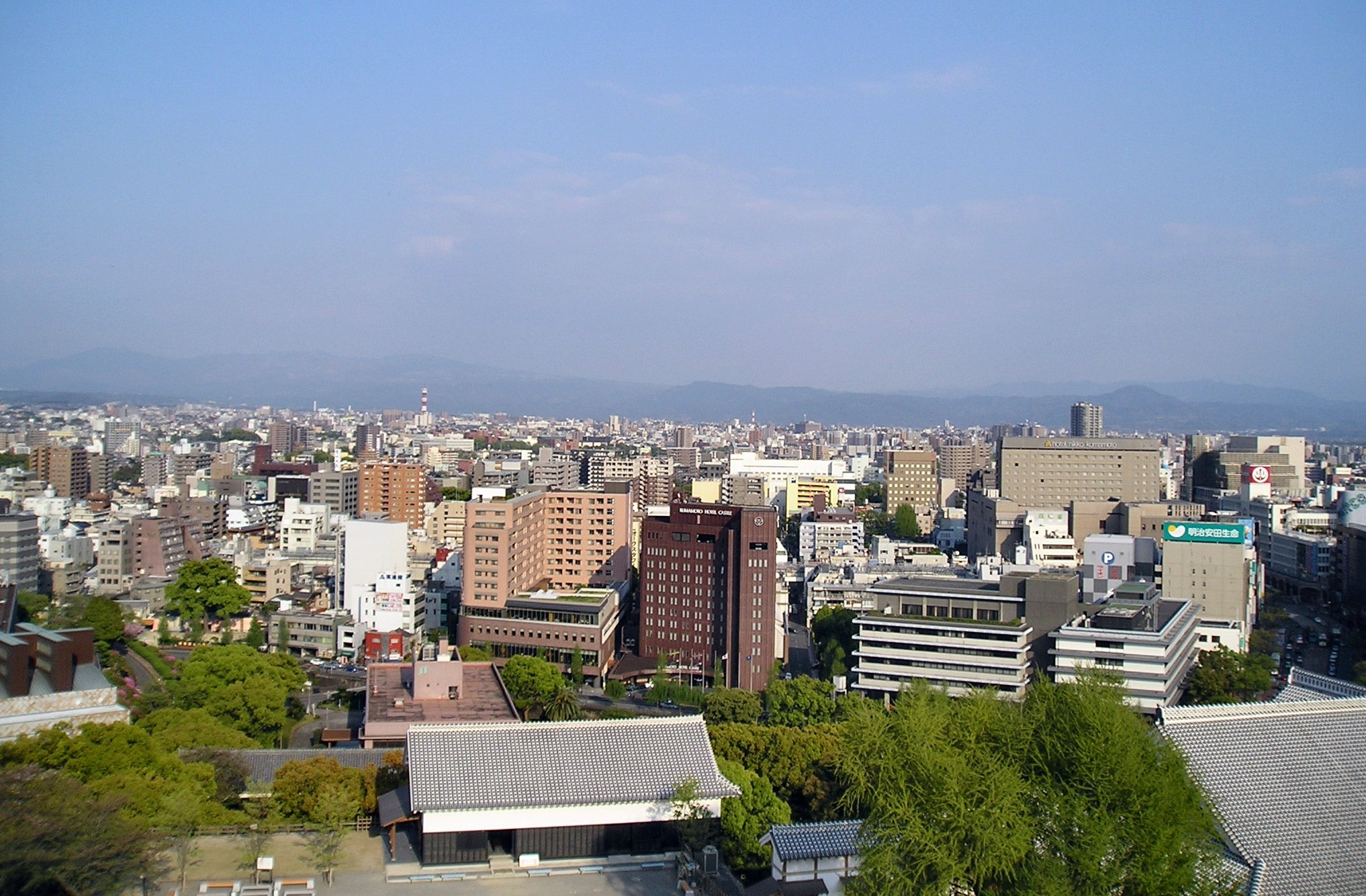
Kumamoto City

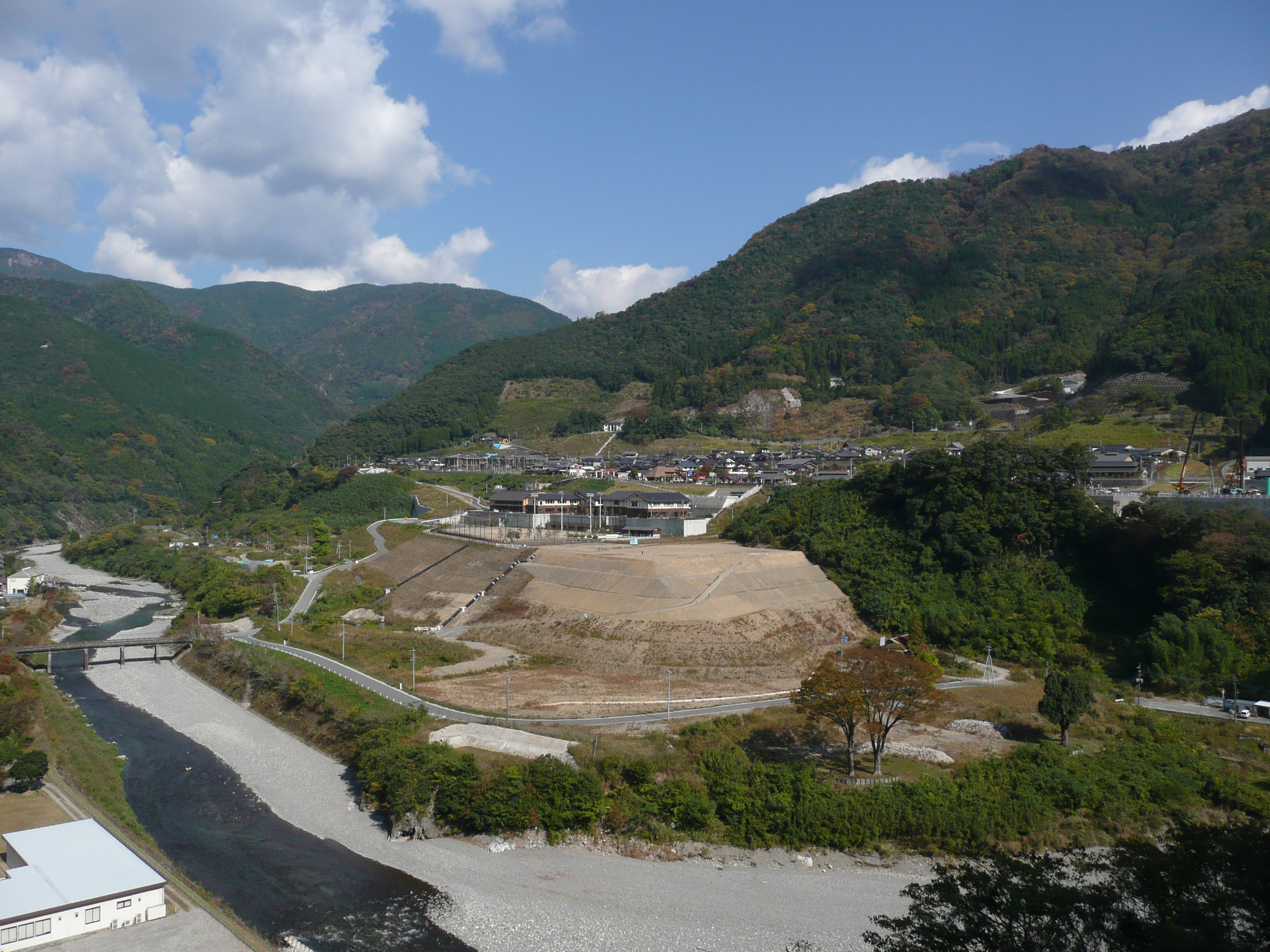
Itsuki Village

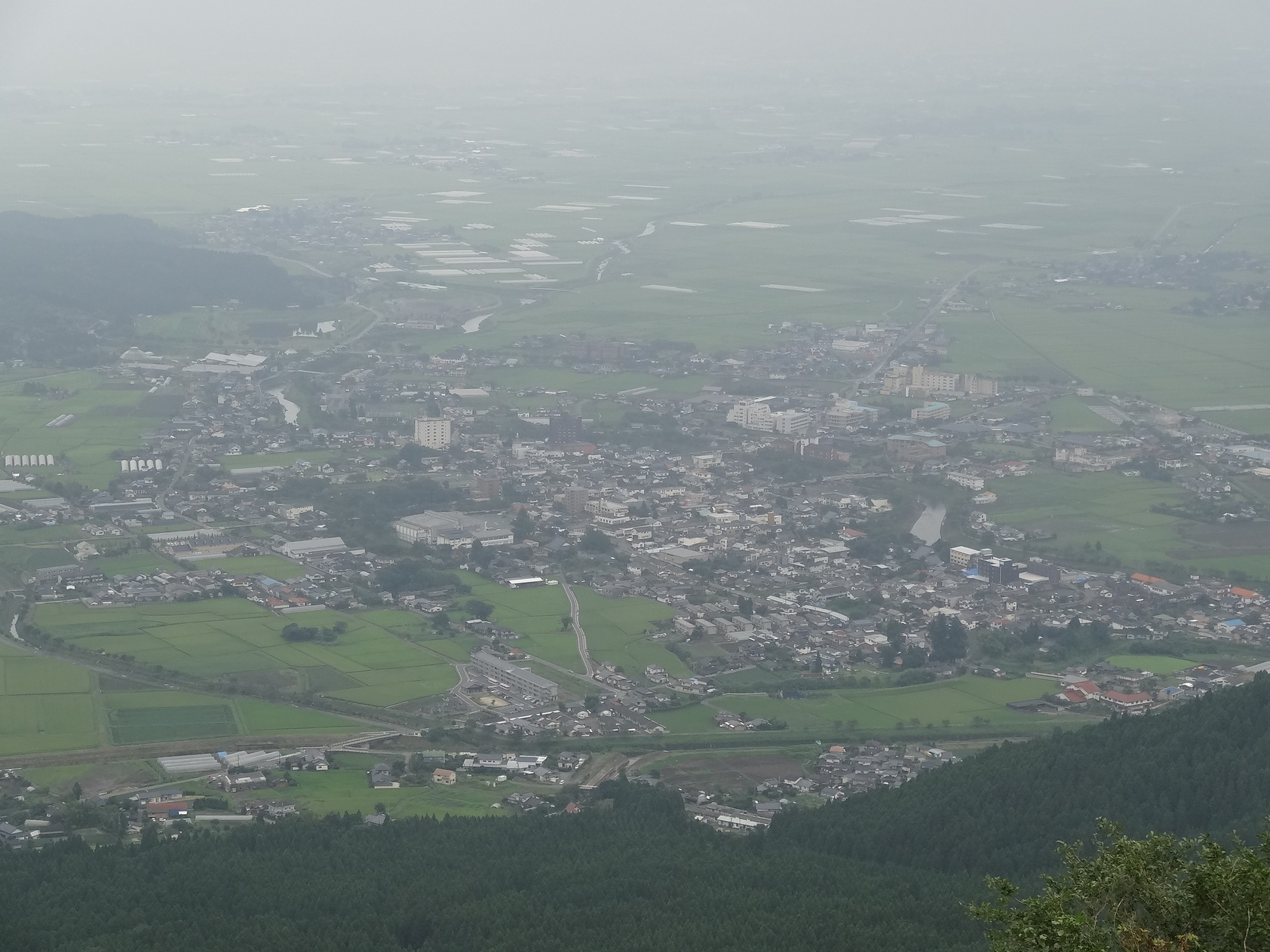
Aso City

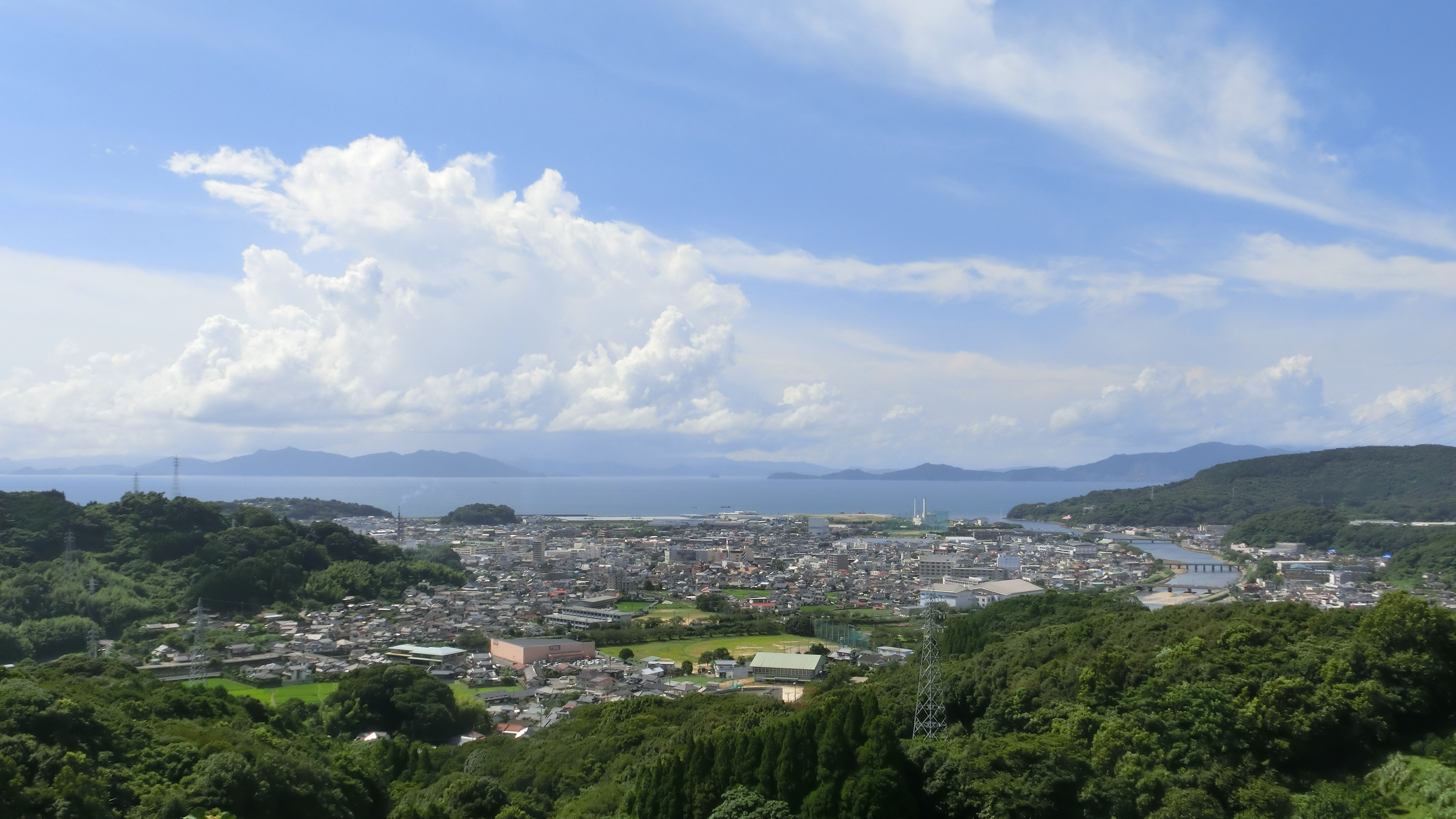
Minamata

Fourteen cities are located in Kumamoto Prefecture:

Name		Area (km^{2})	Population	Map
Rōmaji	Kanji	Area (km^{2})	Population	Map
Amakusa	天草市	683.17	83,082	
Arao	荒尾市	57.15	53,675	
Aso	阿蘇市	376.25	27,039	
Hitoyoshi	人吉市	210.55	33,461	
Kami-Amakusa	上天草市	126.94	27,603	
Kikuchi	菊池市	276.66	49,455	
Kōshi	合志市	53.19	61,022	
Kumamoto (capital)	熊本市	390.32	738,907	
Minamata	水俣市	162.88	25,310	
Tamana	玉名市	152.55	70,530	
Uki	宇城市	188.56	59,928	
Uto	宇土市	74.17	37,442	
Yamaga	山鹿市	299.67	53,404	
Yatsushiro	八代市	680.59	129,358	

=== Towns and villages ===
These are the towns and villages in each district:

Name		Area (km^{2})	Population	District	Type	Map
Rōmaji	Kanji	Area (km^{2})	Population	District	Type	Map
Asagiri	あさぎり町	159.56	15,796	Kuma District	Town	
Ashikita	芦北町	233.48	16,306	Ashikita District	Town	
Gyokutō	玉東町	24.4	5,363	Tamana District	Town	
Hikawa	氷川町	33.29	12,250	Yatsushiro District	Town	
Itsuki	五木村	252.94	1,136	Kuma District	Village	
Kashima	嘉島町	16.66	9,119	Kamimashiki District	Town	
Kikuyō	菊陽町	37.57	41,411	Kikuchi District	Town	
Kōsa	甲佐町	57.87	10,924	Kamimashiki District	Town	
Kuma	球磨村	207.73	3,863	Kuma District	Village	
Mashiki	益城町	65.67	33,001	Kamimashiki District	Town	
Mifune	御船町	99	16,901	Kamimashiki District	Town	
Minamiaso	南阿蘇村	137.3	11,086	Aso District	Village	
Minamioguni	南小国町	115.86	3,977	Aso District	Town	
Misato	美里町	144.03	10,532	Shimomashiki District	Town	
Mizukami	水上村	192.11	2,276	Kuma District	Village	
Nagasu	長洲町	19.43	16,125	Tamana District	Town	
Nagomi	和水町	98.75	10,030	Tamana District	Town	
Nankan	南関町	68.92	9,572	Tamana District	Town	
Nishihara	西原村	77.23	6,752	Aso District	Village	
Nishiki	錦町	84.87	10,899	Kuma District	Town	
Oguni	小国町	137	8,735	Aso District	Town	
Ōzu	大津町	99.09	33,793	Kikuchi District	Town	
Reihoku	苓北町	67.06	7,462	Amakusa District	Town	
Sagara	相良村	94.54	4,598	Kuma District	Village	
Takamori	高森町	174.9	6,189	Aso District	Town	
Taragi	多良木町	165.87	9,604	Kuma District	Town	
Tsunagi	津奈木町	33.97	4,574	Ashikita District	Town	
Ubuyama	産山村	60.72	1,542	Aso District	Village	
Yamae	山江村	121.2	3,553	Kuma District	Village	
Yamato	山都町	544.83	15,771	Kamimashiki District	Town	
Yunomae	湯前町	48.41	4,046	Kuma District	Town	

== Demographics ==
As of 1 June 2019, the population was 1,748,134 inhabitants with a population density of 236 inhabitants per square kilometre (610/sq mi). The prefecture ranks 23rd in Japan.

== Economy ==
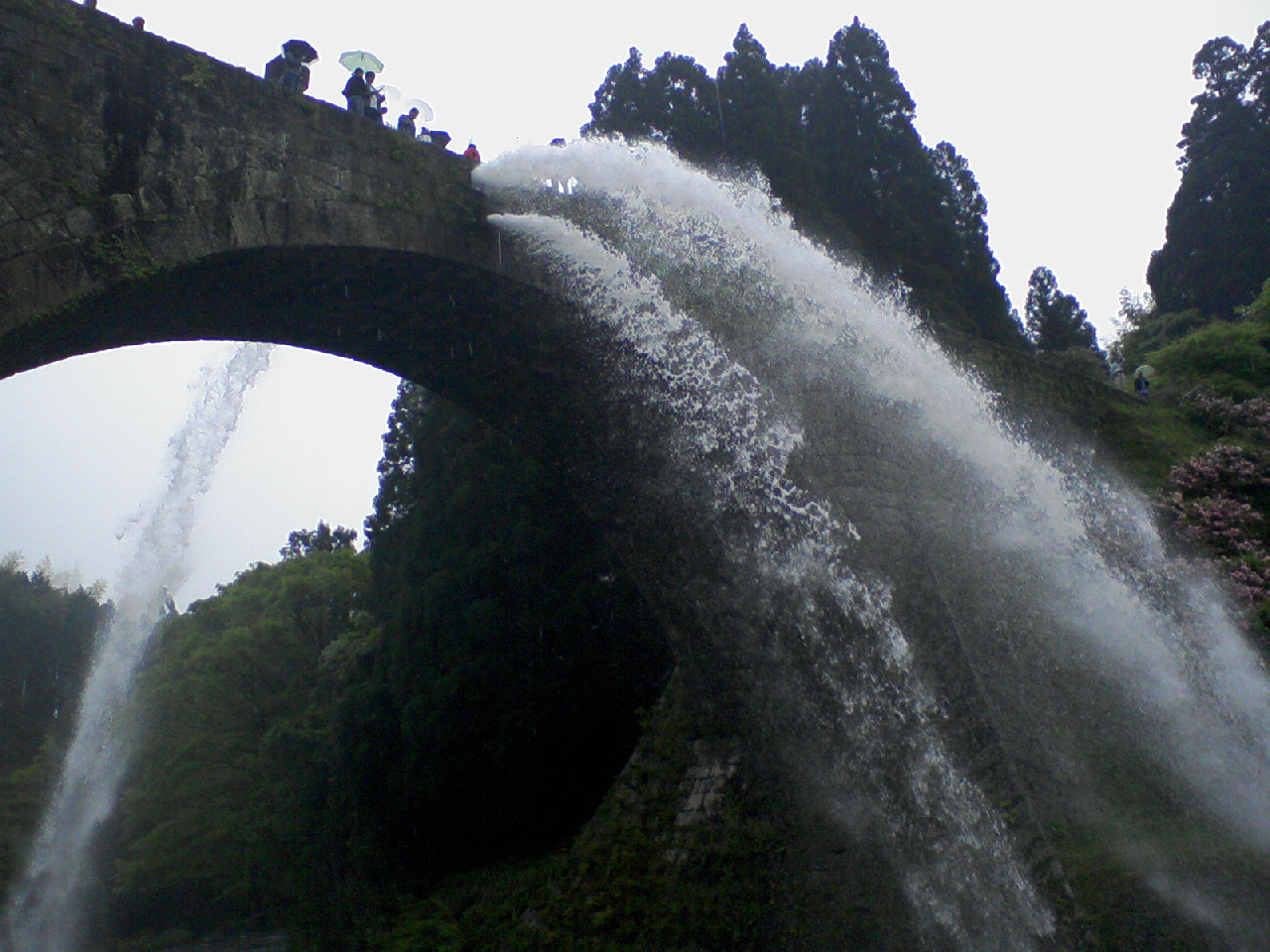
Tsūjun Bridge in Yamato, Kamimashiki

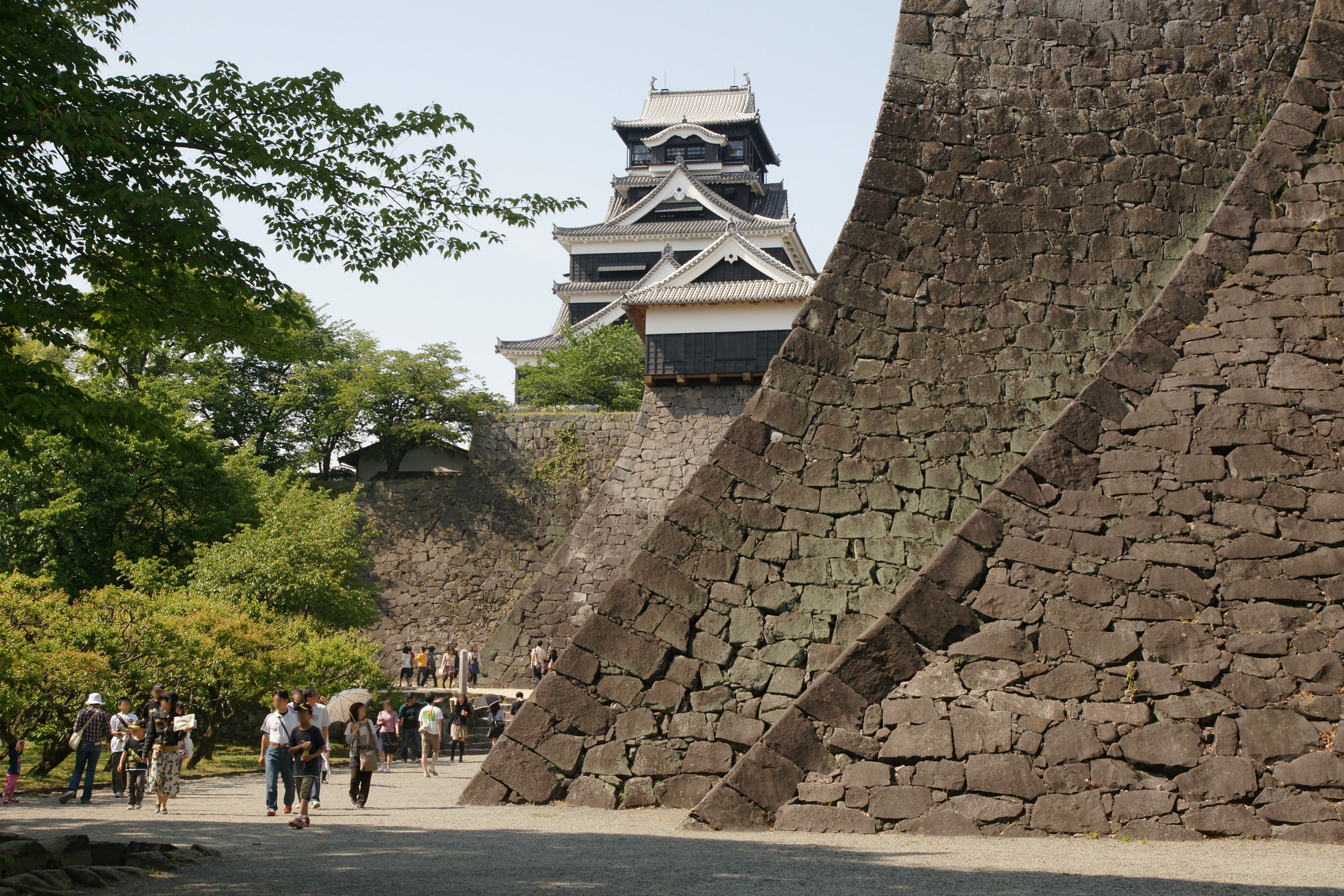
Kumamoto Castle

The largest motorcycle production facility in the world is located in Kumamoto.

In 2023, Mitsubishi Electric announced plans to spend 100 billion yen on a new semiconductor factory in Kumamoto, with a target start date of April 2026 to begin production.

=== Tourism ===
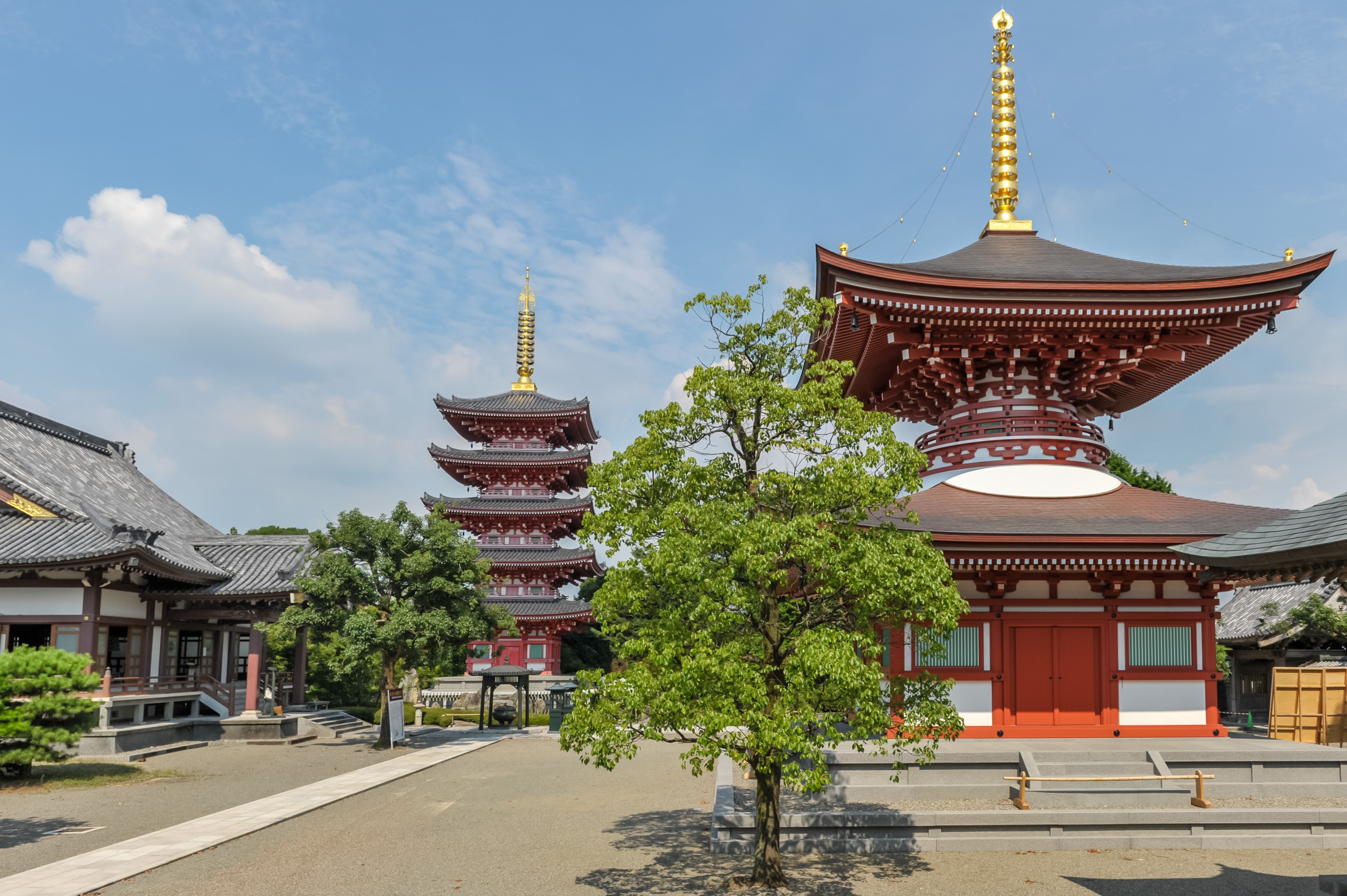
Renge-in Tanjō-ji

- Kumamoto Castle
- Mount Aso is one of the world's largest active volcanoes.
- Suizenji Park
- Tsūjun Bridge, the largest stone aqueduct in Japan is in Yamato

The prefecture has a mascot named "Kumamon", a black bear with red cheeks, who was created to attract tourists to the region after the Kyushu Shinkansen line opened.

== Education ==
=== Universities ===
==== National ====
- Kumamoto University

==== Public ====
- Prefectural University of Kumamoto

==== Private ====
- Heisei College of Music
- Kumamoto Gakuen University
- Kumamoto Health Science
- Kyushu Lutheran College
- Kyushu University of Nursing and Social Welfare
- Shokei Gakuin University
- Sojo University

== Transportation ==
=== Rail ===
- Hisatsu Orange Railway
- JR Kyushu
  - Hisatsu Line
  - Hohi Line
  - Kagoshima Line
  - Kyushu Shinkansen
  - Misumi Line
- Kumamoto Electric Railway
- Kumagawa Railroad
- Minami Aso Railway

=== Tramway ===
- Kumamoto City Transportation Bureau

=== Road ===
==== Expressways and toll roads ====
- Kumamoto Amakusa Road
- Kyushu Chūō Expressway
- Kyushu Expressway
- South Kyushu Expressway

==== National highways ====
- Route 3
- Route 57
- Route 208 (Kumamoto-Tamana-Arao-Ōmuta)
- Route 212
- Route 218 (Kumamoto-Takachiho-Nobeoka)
- Route 219
- Route 265
- Route 266
- Route 267 (Hitoyoshi-Isa-Satsuma-Satsumasendai)
- Route 268
- Route 324
- Route 325 (Yamaga-Minamiaso-Takamori-Takachiho)
- Route 387
- Route 388 (Saiki-Nobeoka-Unomae)
- Route 389
- Route 442
- Route 443
- Route 445
- Route 501 (Ōmuta-Arao-Uto)
- Route 503

=== Ports ===
==== Ferry routes ====
- Kumamoto–Shimabara
- Nagasu–Unzen
- Reihoku–Nagasaki
- Ushibuka–Kuranomoto (Nagashima)
- Yatsushiro–Kamiamakusa

=== Airports ===
- Amakusa Airport
- Kumamoto Airport

== Sports ==
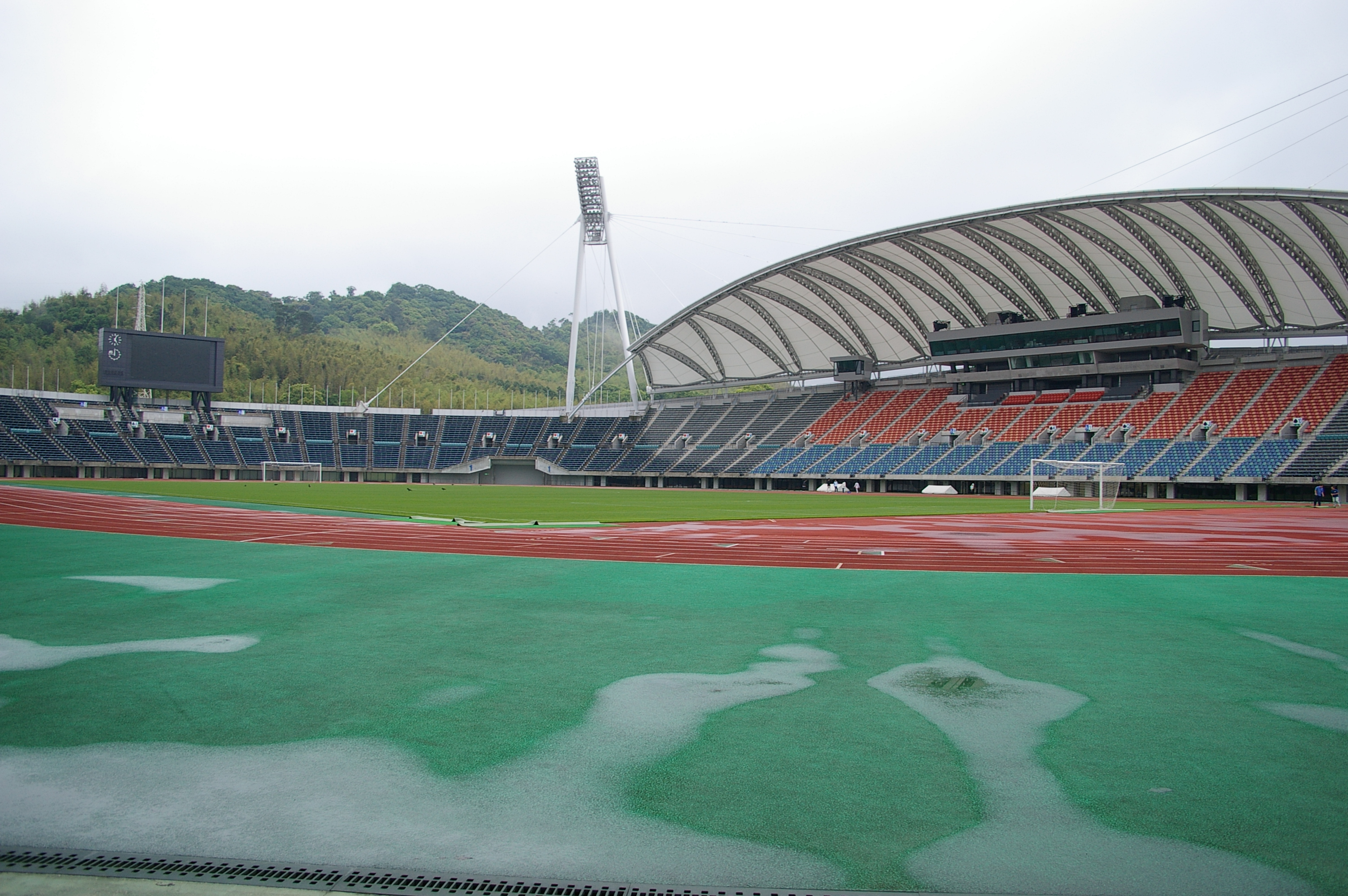
Roasso Kumamoto franchise stadium in KKWing of Kumamoto

These sports teams are based in the prefecture:

- Professional:
  - Blaze Kumamoto – Men's association football
  - Mashiki Renaissance Kumamoto – Women's association football
  - Roasso Kumamoto – Men's football and J League Second Division
- Amateur:
  - Kumamoto Golden Larks – regional baseball

Kumamoto Prefecture hosted the 2019 World Women's Handball Championship, having previously hosted the 1997 World Men's Handball Championship.

== Sister cities ==
Kumamoto Prefecture is the 'sister state/prefecture' of Montana in the United States.

San Antonio, Texas is Kumamoto's sister city; it holds an annual fall festival 'akimatsuri' for its Japanese citizens. In 2015 the mascot, 'Kumamon' visited as an honorary ambassador during the festival located at the Japanese Tea Gardens.

== Notable people ==
- Naoichi Fujimori, father of Peruvian President Alberto Fujimori
- Kouki Fujiwara, drummer of WANIMA
- Madoka Hisagae, female Japanese fencer
- Kimeru, pop artist
- Kazuaki Kiriya, filmmaker
- Miku Kobato, founder and vocalist of Band-Maid
- Tetsu Komai, Hollywood actor
- Jun Kunimura, Japanese actor
- Yuri Masuda, singer
- Kenta Matsumoto, vocalist and bassist of WANIMA
- Yuki Midorikawa, manga author, creator of Natsume's Book of Friends and Hotarubi no Mori e
- Munetaka Murakami, Japanese baseball player
- Kunio Nakagawa, Japanese Army general
- Shodai Naoya, Sumo wrestler
- Koushin Nishida, guitarist of WANIMA
- Tetsuya Noda, contemporary artist
- Eiichiro Oda, manga author, creator of One Piece
- Hitomi Tanaka, pornographic actress
- Ichiki Tatsuo, journalist and defector in the Indonesian National Revolution
- Katsuhiro Ueo, drifting driver
- Tomiko Van, singer, vocalist of Do As Infinity
- Aki Yashiro, Japanese singer
