= Aso-Shimodajyō Station =

Railway station Kumamoto prefecture, Japan

Aso-Shimodajyō Station 阿蘇下田城駅
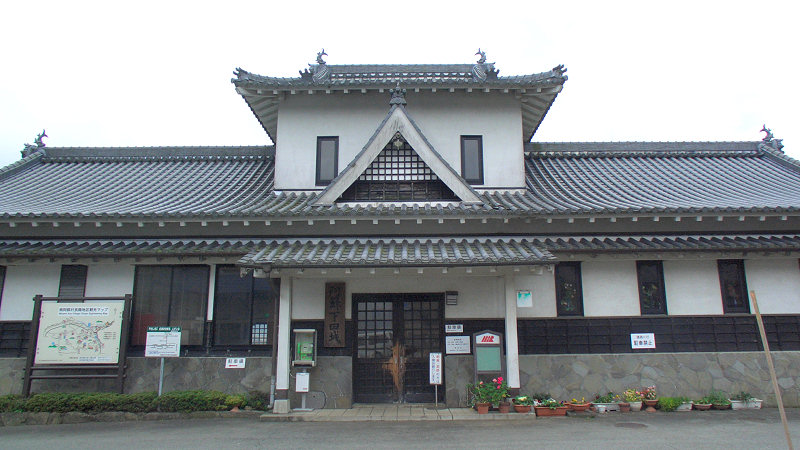
- Station entrance in 2006

General information
- Location: Oaza Koyo, Minamiaso Village, Aso County, Kumamoto Prefecture; Japan
- Coordinates: 32.84435°N 131.02475°E
- Line(s): ■ Takamori Line
- Distance: 7.2 km (from Tateno Station)
- Tracks: 1
- Train operators: Minamiaso Railway

Construction
- Structure type: At-grade

Other information
- Status: Unstaffed
- Website: https://www.mt-torokko.com/information/route/aso-shimoda/

History
- Opened: 1928

Services
Preceding station	Mimamiaso Railway	Following station
Kase towards Tateno	Takamori Line	Minamiaso Mizu-no-Umareru-Sato Hakusui-Kōgen towards Takamori
Location

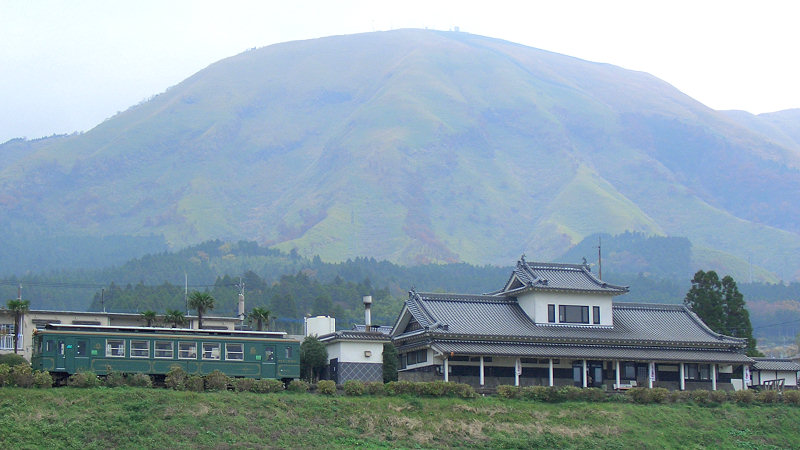
Back of station

Aso-Shimodajyō Station (阿蘇下田城駅, あそしもだじょうえき) is a railway station on the Minamiaso Railway Takamori Line in Minamiaso Village, Aso District, Kumamoto Prefecture, Japan. The station's former name (Aso Shimodajō Fureai Onsen) when written in kana has 16 characters, making it the fifth longest station name in Japan, along with Yanagawa Kibōnomori Kōen-mae Station on the Abukuma Express Line. The station was renamed to Aso-Shimodajyō Station in July 2023, as the hot spring facilities at the station were shut down.

== Station layout ==
The station is unstaffed, and has a single platform with one track. The station building has a castle-like appearance, reminiscent of Shimoda Castle, which was located in the vicinity during the Tensho era. Aso-Shimodajō Station used to have a mineral-free, indoor onsen, but it was shut down in 2016 due to damage caused by the 2016 Kumamoto earthquake.

== Usage ==
Year	Average daily passengers
2011	37
2012	43
2013	36
2014	31
2015	23
2016	Service stopped

== History ==
- February 12, 1928 - opened as Aso-Shimoda Station (阿蘇下田駅).
- February 20, 1971 - the station became unstaffed.
- April 1, 1986 - the Minamiaso Railway company took over operation of the Takamori line from Japanese National Railways.
- August 1, 1993 - the station was renamed Aso-Shimodajō-Fureai-Onsen Station (阿蘇下田城ふれあい温泉駅). A new station building with hot spring facilities was completed.
- April 14–16, 2016 - the Kumamoto Earthquake caused damage to bridges and tunnels on the Takamori line, and operations were suspended.
- July 15, 2023 - The portion of the Minami Aso Railway Takamori Line between Tateno and Nakamatsu has been restored and all lines have resumed operation. The station name was changed to Aso-Shimodajyō Station (阿蘇下田城駅).
