= Minamiaso Mizu-no-Umareru-Sato Hakusui-Kōgen Station =

Railway station in Minamiaso, Kumamoto prefecture, Japan

Coordinates: 32.8341°N 131.0402°E

Minamiaso Mizu-no-Umareru-Sato Hakusui-Kōgen Station 南阿蘇水の生まれる里白水高原駅
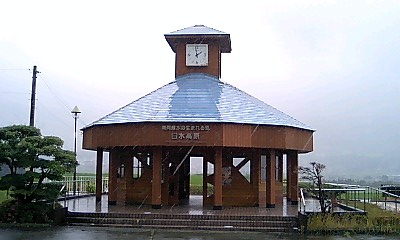

General information
- Other names: Hakusui-Kōgen Station
- Location: Ōaza Nakamatsu, Minamiaso, Aso, Kumamoto; Japan
- Operator: Minamiaso Railway
- Line: Takamori Line

Other information
- Website: https://www.mt-torokko.com/information/route/hakusui-kougen/

History
- Opened: April 1, 1992

Services
Preceding station	Mimamiaso Railway	Following station
Aso-Shimodajyō towards Tateno	Takamori Line	Nakamatsu towards Takamori
Location

Minamiaso Mizu-no-Umareru-Sato Hakusui-Kōgen Station (南阿蘇水の生まれる里白水高原駅, Minamiaso Mizu-no-umareru-sato Hakusui-kōgen-eki), usually abbreviated to Hakusui-Kōgen Station, is a railway station located in Minamiaso, Kumamoto, Japan. It is an ancient site of a well in the foothills of Japan's largest volcano, Mount Aso.

The station was originally tied with Chojagahama Shiosai Hamanasu Koenmae Station for the longest train station name in Japan, with 22 hiragana characters each, until both were surpassed by Tōjiin Ritsumeikan University Station in Kyoto in 2020.

== History ==
- April 1, 1992 - station opened.
- April 14–16, 2016 - the Kumamoto earthquake caused damage to bridges and tunnels on the Takamori line, and operations were suspended.
- July 15, 2023 - The portion of the Minami Aso Railway Takamori Line between Tateno and Nakamatsu has been restored and all lines have resumed operation.

== See also ==
- List of Japanese records
