= Chōyō Station =

Railway station in Minamiaso, Kumamoto, Japan

Choyo Station 長陽駅
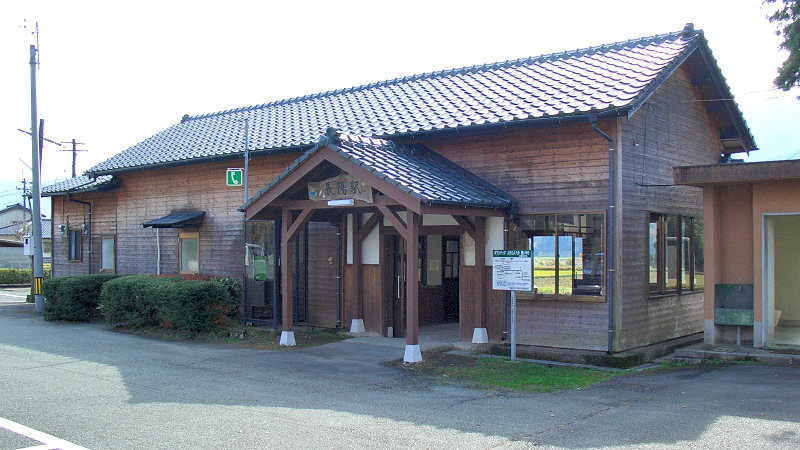
- Station building

General information
- Location: Oaza Koyo, Minamiaso Village, Aso County, Kumamoto Prefecture; Japan
- Coordinates: 32.85432°N 131.00385°E
- Line: ■ Takamori Line
- Distance: 4.7 km (from Tateno Station)
- Tracks: 1
- Train operators: Minamiaso Railway

Construction
- Structure type: At-grade

Other information
- Status: Unstaffed
- Website: https://www.mt-torokko.com/information/route/choyo/

History
- Opened: 1928
- Closed: 2016

Services
Preceding station	Mimamiaso Railway	Following station
Tateno Terminus	Takamori Line	Kase towards Takamori
Location

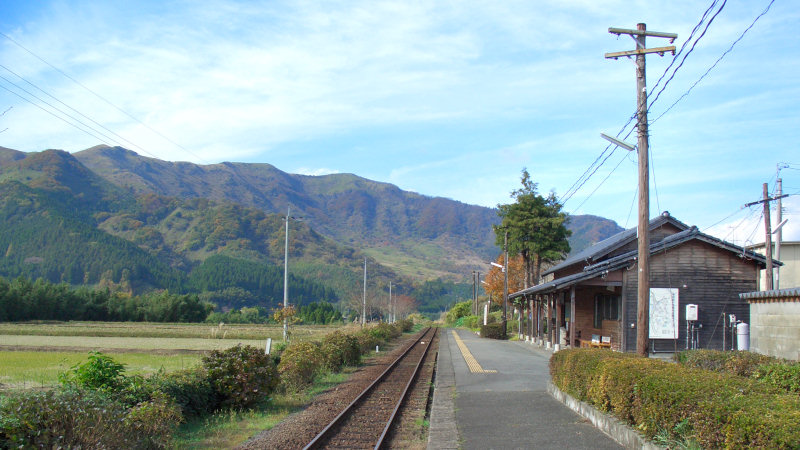
Platform

Choyo Station (長陽駅; ちょうようえき) is a railway station on the Minamiaso Railway Takamori Line in Minamiaso Village, Aso District, Kumamoto Prefecture.

== Station layout ==
The station has a single platform with one track. The station is unstaffed, but has a wooden station building. Currently, the former station office has been renovated into the station café Hisanagaya, which is open only on weekends.

== Usage ==
Year	Avg. Daily boarding passengers	Avg. Daily disembarking passengers
2011	43	87
2012	41	83
2013	46	90
2014	38	77
2015	37	75
2016	Service stopped	

== History ==
- 12 February 1928 - opened for business.
- 20 February 1971 - the station became unstaffed.
- On 1 April 1986 - the station was converted from the Takamori Line of the Japanese National Railways to Minamiaso Railway.
- 14–16 April 2016 - the Kumamoto earthquakes damaged the line's bridges and tunnel structures, and operations were suspended.
- 15 July 2023 - Minami Aso Railway Takamori Line between Tateno and Nakamatsu has been restored and all lines have resumed operation.
