= Kase Station (Kumamoto) =

Railway station in Japan

Kase Station 加勢駅
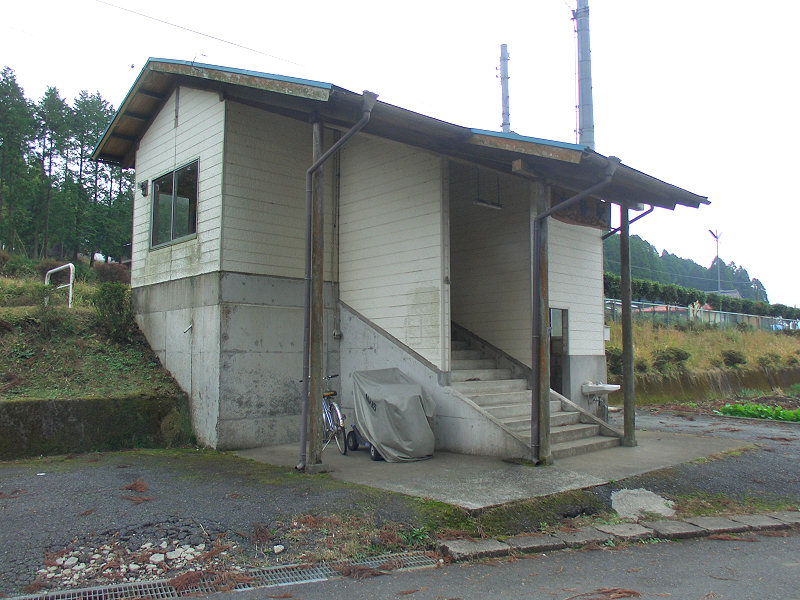
- Station building

General information
- Location: Oaza Koyo, Minamiaso Village, Aso District, Kumamoto Prefecture
- Coordinates: 32.84778°N 131.01016°E
- Line: ■ Takamori Line
- Distance: 5.7 km (from Tateno Station)
- Tracks: 1
- Train operators: Minamiaso Railway

Construction
- Structure type: At-grade

Other information
- Status: Unstaffed
- Website: https://www.mt-torokko.com/information/route/kase/

History
- Opened: 1986
- Closed: 2016

Services
Preceding station	Mimamiaso Railway	Following station
Chōyō towards Tateno	Takamori Line	Aso-Shimodajyō towards Takamori
Location

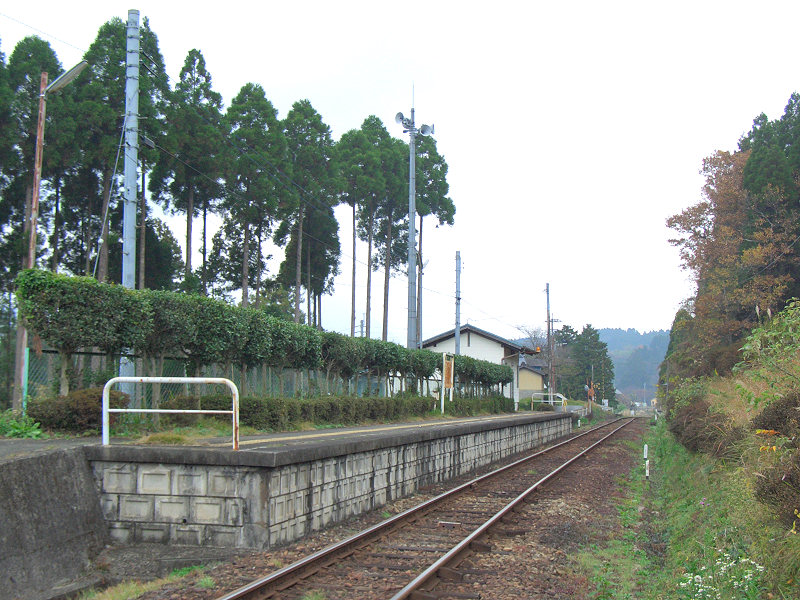
Station platform

Kase Station (加勢駅; かせえき) is a railway station on the Minamiaso Railway Takamori Line in Minamiaso Village, Aso District, Kumamoto Prefecture, Japan.

== Station layout ==
The station is built at-grade and has a single platform with one track.

== Usage ==
Year	Average daily passengers
2011	16
2012	11
2013	8
2014	7
2015	6
2016	Service stopped
2017	Service stopped

== History ==
- October 1, 1986 - Station opened for business.
- April 14–16, 2016 - the Kumamoto earthquakes caused damage to bridges and tunnels on the Takamori line, and operations have since been suspended.
- July 15, 2023 - Minami Aso Railway Takamori Line between Tateno and Nakamatsu has been restored and all lines have resumed operation.
