= Aso-Shirakawa Station =

Railway station located in Minamiaso, Kumamoto

Aso-Shirakawa Station 阿蘇白川駅
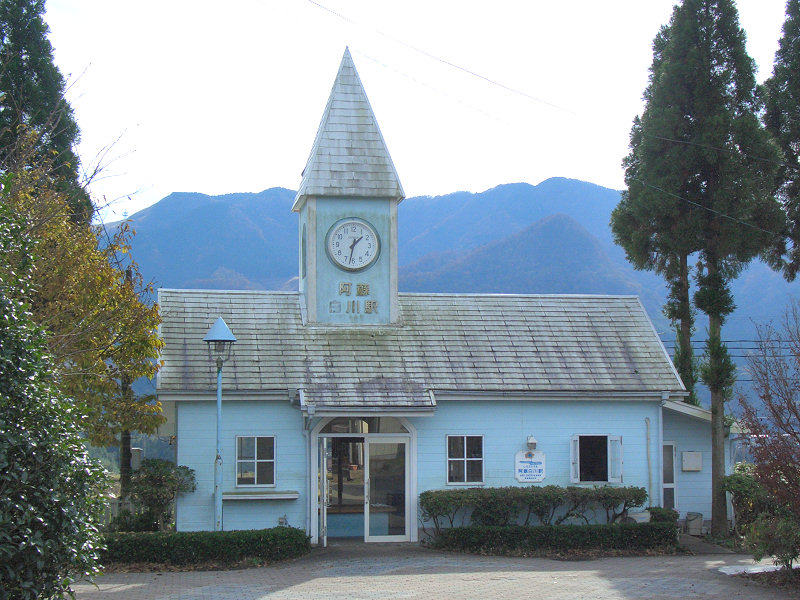
- Station entrance

General information
- Location: Minamiaso, Kumamoto; Japan
- Coordinates: 32.8224°N 131.0842°E
- Operator: Minamiaso Railway
- Line: ■ Takamori Line
- Distance: 13.5 km (from Tateno Station)
- Platforms: 1 side platform

Construction
- Structure type: At-grade

Other information
- Status: Unstaffed

History
- Opened: 12 February 1928

Services
Preceding station	Mimamiaso Railway	Following station
Nakamatsu towards Tateno	Takamori Line	Minamiaso-Shirakawasuigen towards Takamori
Location

Aso-Shirakawa Station (阿蘇白川駅, Aso-Shirakawa-eki) is a railway station in Minamiaso, Kumamoto Prefecture, Japan. It is on the Takamori Line, operated by the Minamiaso Railway.

Following the damage from severe earthquakes in April 2016, the entire Takamori Line was shut down. Service was resumed in July of the same year.

== History ==
- 12 February, 1928 - Station opened for business.
- 1 April 1986, - the station was converted from the Takamori Line of the Japanese National Railways to Minamiaso Railway.
- 14–16 April 2016, - the Kumamoto earthquakes caused damage to bridges and tunnels on the Takamori line, and operations have since been suspended.
- 31 July 2016, - Aso-Shirakawa Station resumed operations along with the resumption of operations between Nakamatsu and Takamori.
