= Kase Station =

Kase Station is the name of two train stations in Japan:

- Kase Station (Kumamoto) (加勢駅)
- Kase Station (Aomori) (嘉瀬駅)
