= Miharashidai Station =

Railway station located in Minamiaso, Kumamoto

Miharashidai Station 見晴台駅
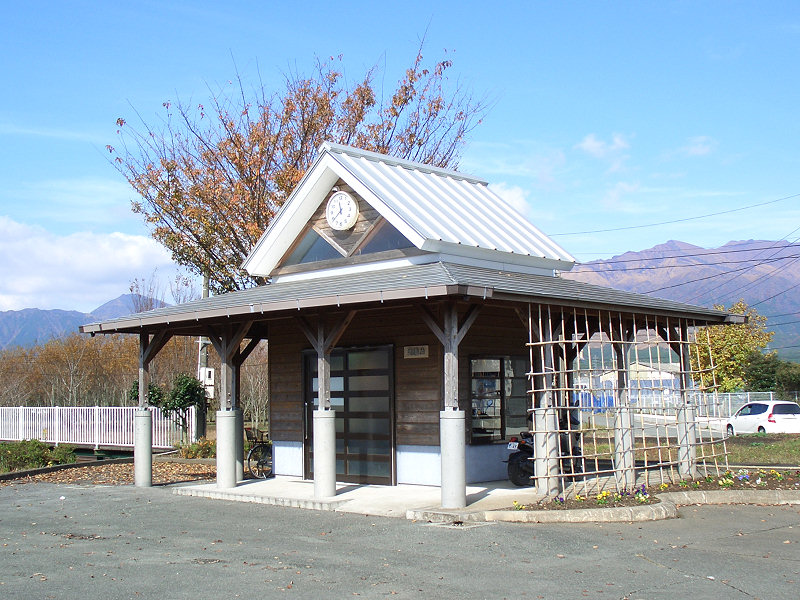
- Miharashidai Station, November 2006

General information
- Location: Ryohei, Minamiaso-mura, Aso-gun, Kumamoto-ken 869-1501; Japan
- Coordinates: 32.8174°N 131.1100°E
- Operator: Minamiaso Railway
- Line: ■ Takamori Line
- Distance: 16.1 km (from Tateno Station)
- Platforms: 1 side platform

Construction
- Structure type: At-grade

Other information
- Status: Unstaffed

History
- Opened: 1 October 1986

Passengers
- FY2018: 1

Services
Preceding station	Mimamiaso Railway	Following station
Minamiaso-Shirakawasuigen towards Tateno	Takamori Line	Takamori Terminus
Location
- Location within Kumamoto Prefecture Location within Japan

Miharashidai Station (見晴台駅, Miharashidai-eki) is a passenger railway station in the village of Minamiaso, Kumamoto Prefecture, Japan. It is operated by the third sector transportation company, Minami Aso Railway.

== Lines ==
The station is served by the Takamori Line and is located 16.1bsp;km from the starting point of the line at Tateno.

== Layout ==
Miharashidai Station is a ground-level station with one side platform. The station building is patterned after a log cabin, and the station is unattended.

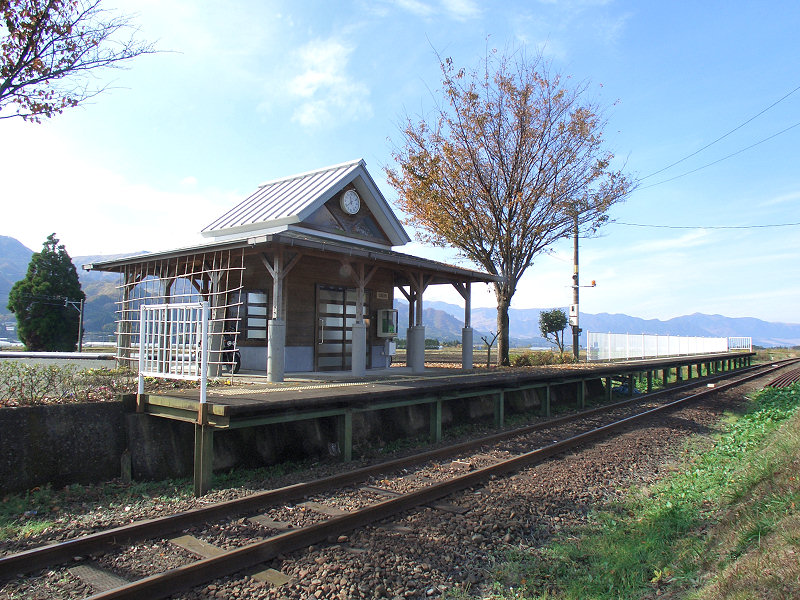
Panoramic view of the station (November 2006)

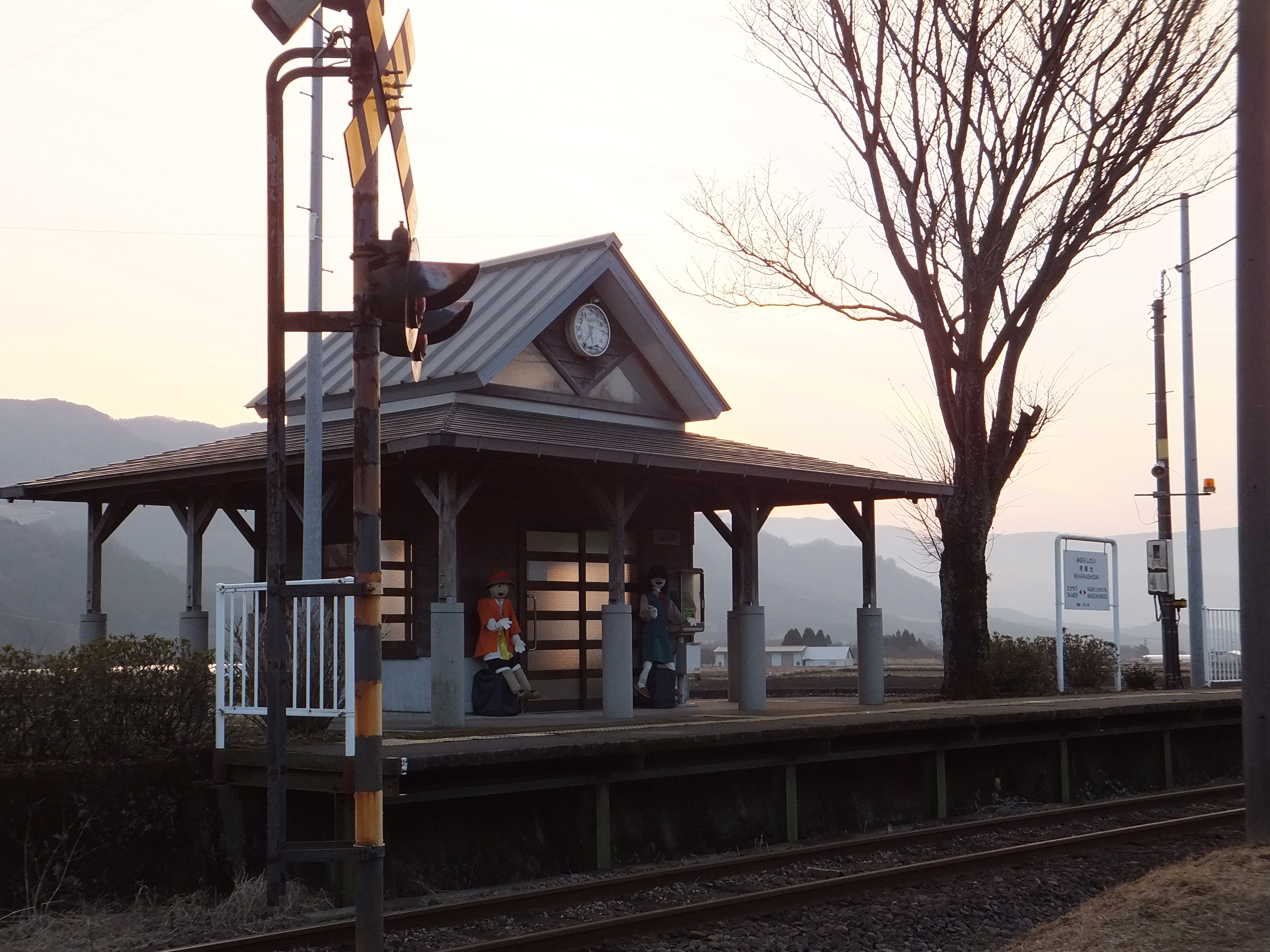
Station building and platform (January 2017)

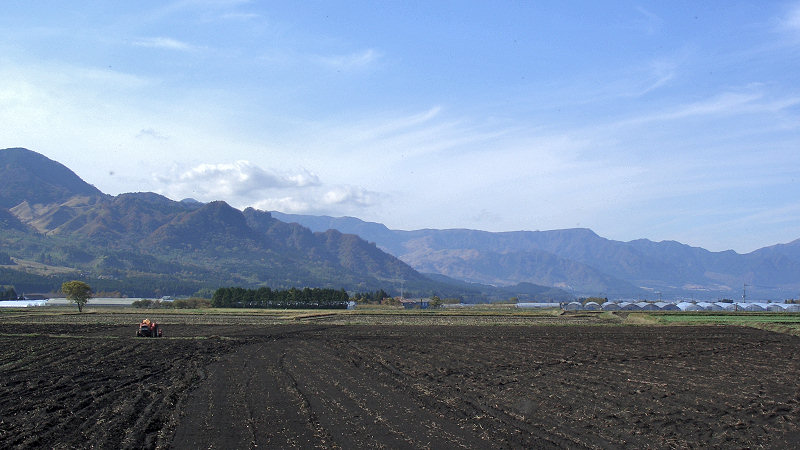
In front of the station (November 2006)

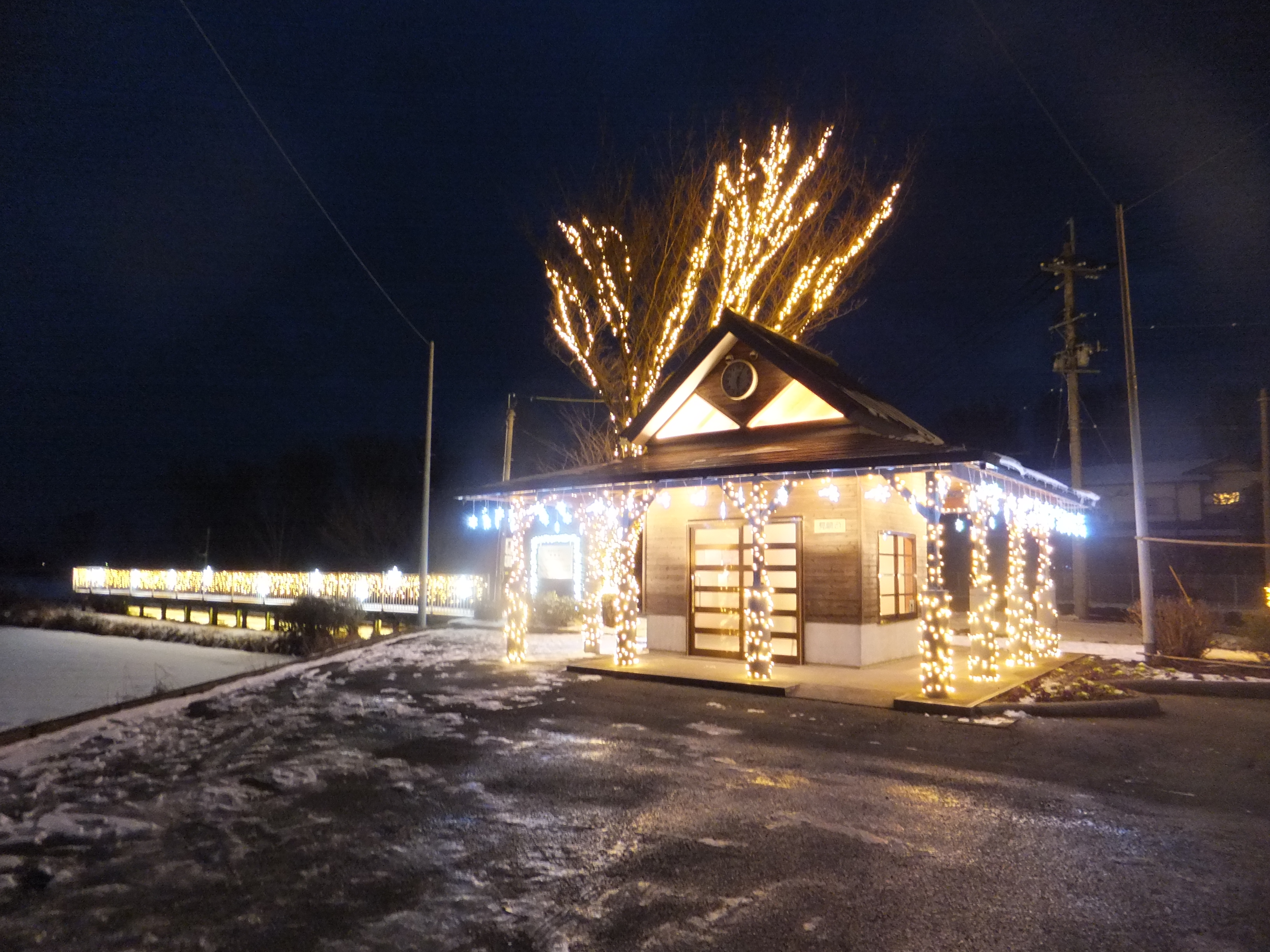
Station building illuminated for a limited time (January 2018)

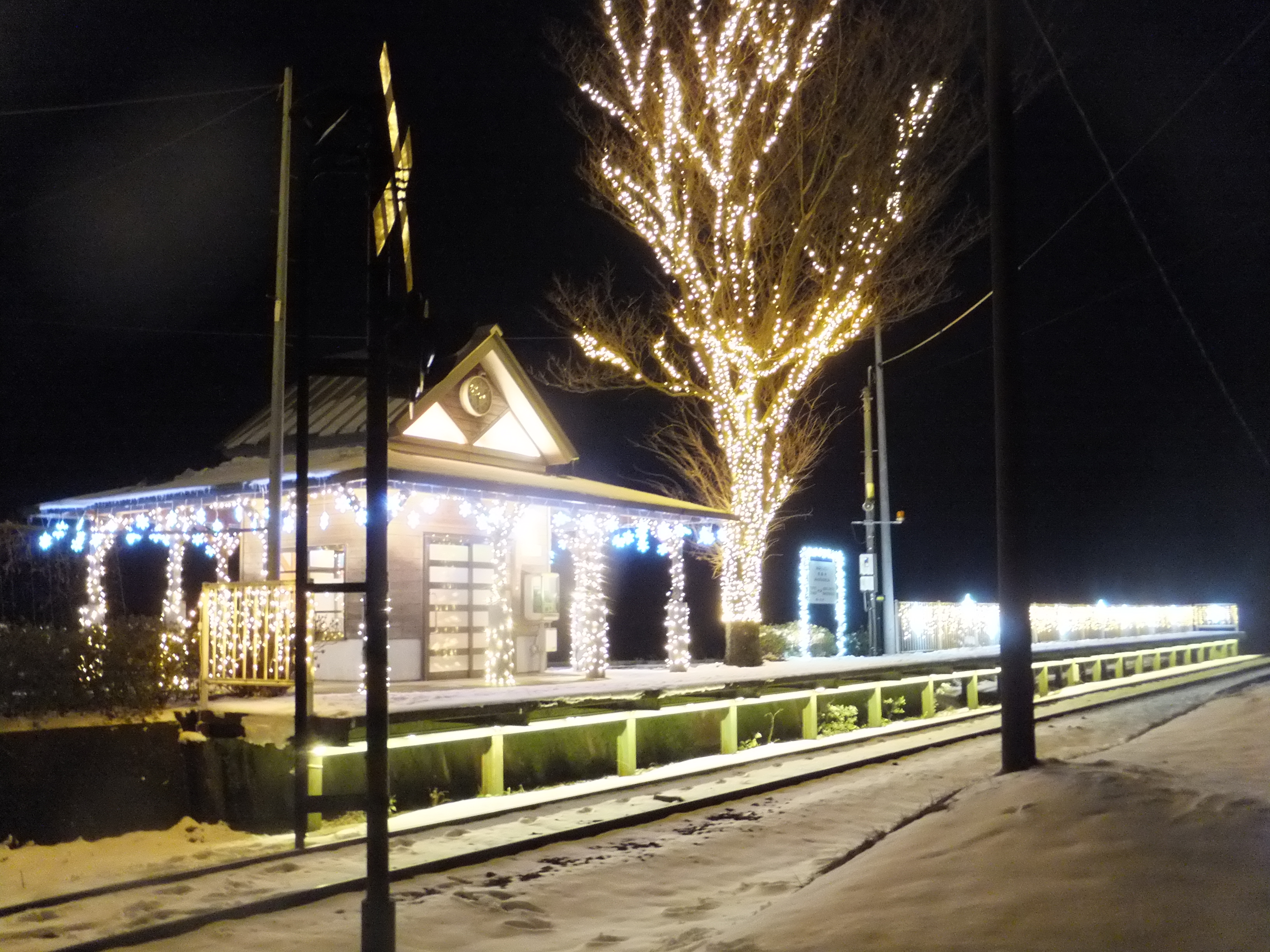
Station building and platform illuminated for a limited time (January 2018)

== History ==
The station was opened on 1 October, 1986. Following the damage to bridges and tunnels on the Takamori line from severe earthquakes in April 2016, the entire line was shut down from14–16 April 2016, Service was resumed on 31 July of the same year.

== Passenger statistics ==
In fiscal 2018, the station was used by an average of 1 passengers daily.

== Surrounding area ==
The station is located near the border between Minamiaso village and Takamori town.

- Takamori Spring Water Tunnel Park - approx. 1.4 km.

== See also ==
- List of railway stations in Japan
