= Minamiaso-Shirakawasuigen Station =

Railway station located in Minamiaso, Kumamoto

Minamiaso-Shirakawasuigen Station 南阿蘇白川水源駅
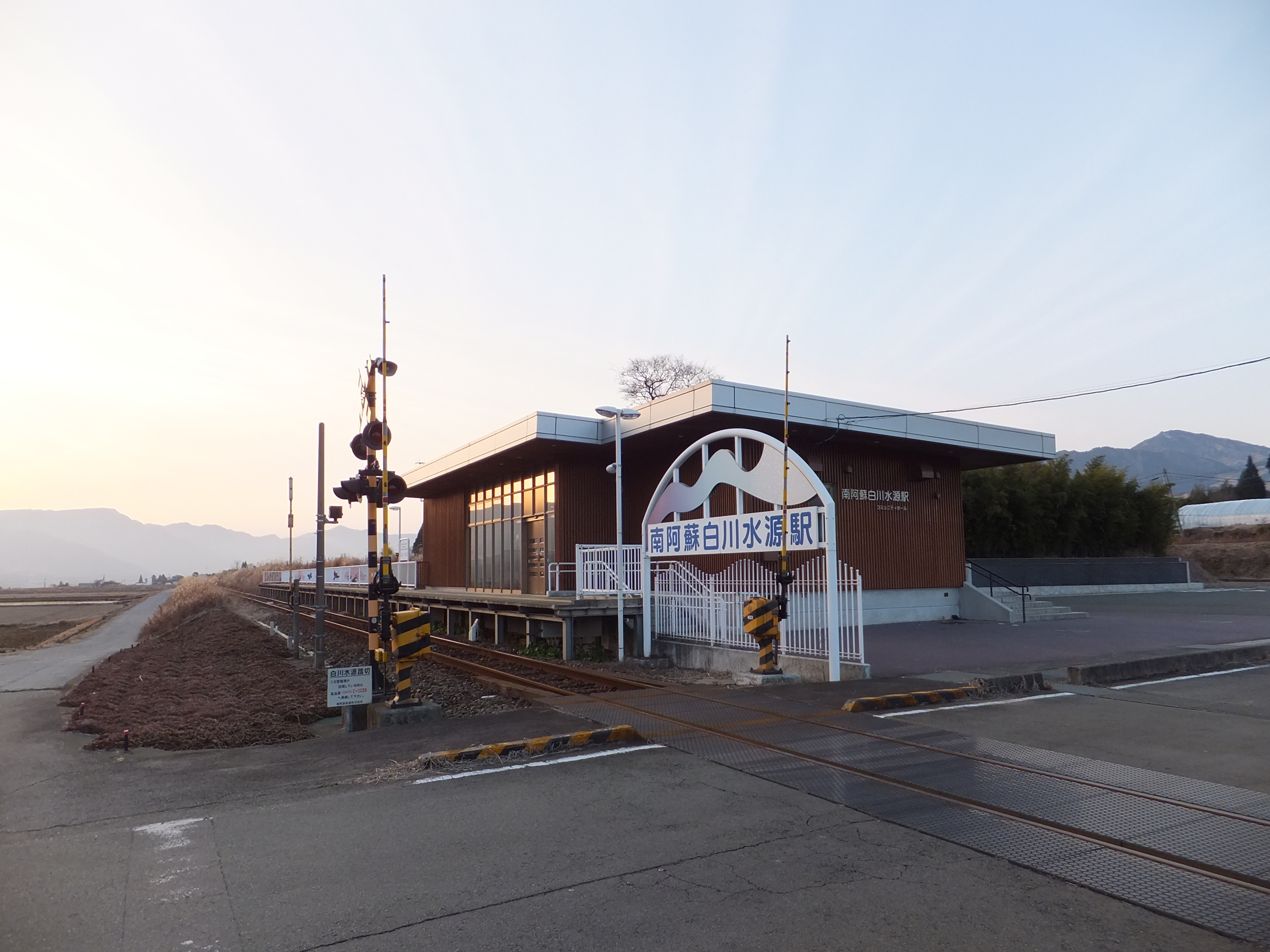
- Station building and platform (January 2017)

General information
- Location: Shirakawa, Minamiaso-mura, Aso-gun, Kumamoto-ken 869-1502; Japan
- Coordinates: 32.8223°N 131.0916°E
- Operator: Minamiaso Railway
- Line: ■ Takamori Line
- Distance: 14.3 km (from Tateno Station)
- Platforms: 1 side platform

Construction
- Structure type: At-grade

Other information
- Status: Unstaffed

History
- Opened: 17 March 2012

Services
Preceding station	Mimamiaso Railway	Following station
Aso-Shirakawa towards Tateno	Takamori Line	Miharashidai towards Takamori
Location
- Location within Kumamoto Prefecture Location within Japan

Minamiaso-Shirakawasuigen Station (南阿蘇白川水源駅, Minamiaso-Shirakawasuigen-eki) is a passenger railway station in the village of Minamiaso, Kumamoto Prefecture, Japan. It is operated by the third sector transportation company, Minami Aso Railway.

== Lines ==
The station is served by the Takamori Line and is located 14.3bsp;km from the starting point of the line at Tateno.

== Layout ==
Minamiaso-Shirakawasuigen Station is a ground-level station with one side platform. The station is unattended, but the station building also serves as a local community center and has a coffee shop.

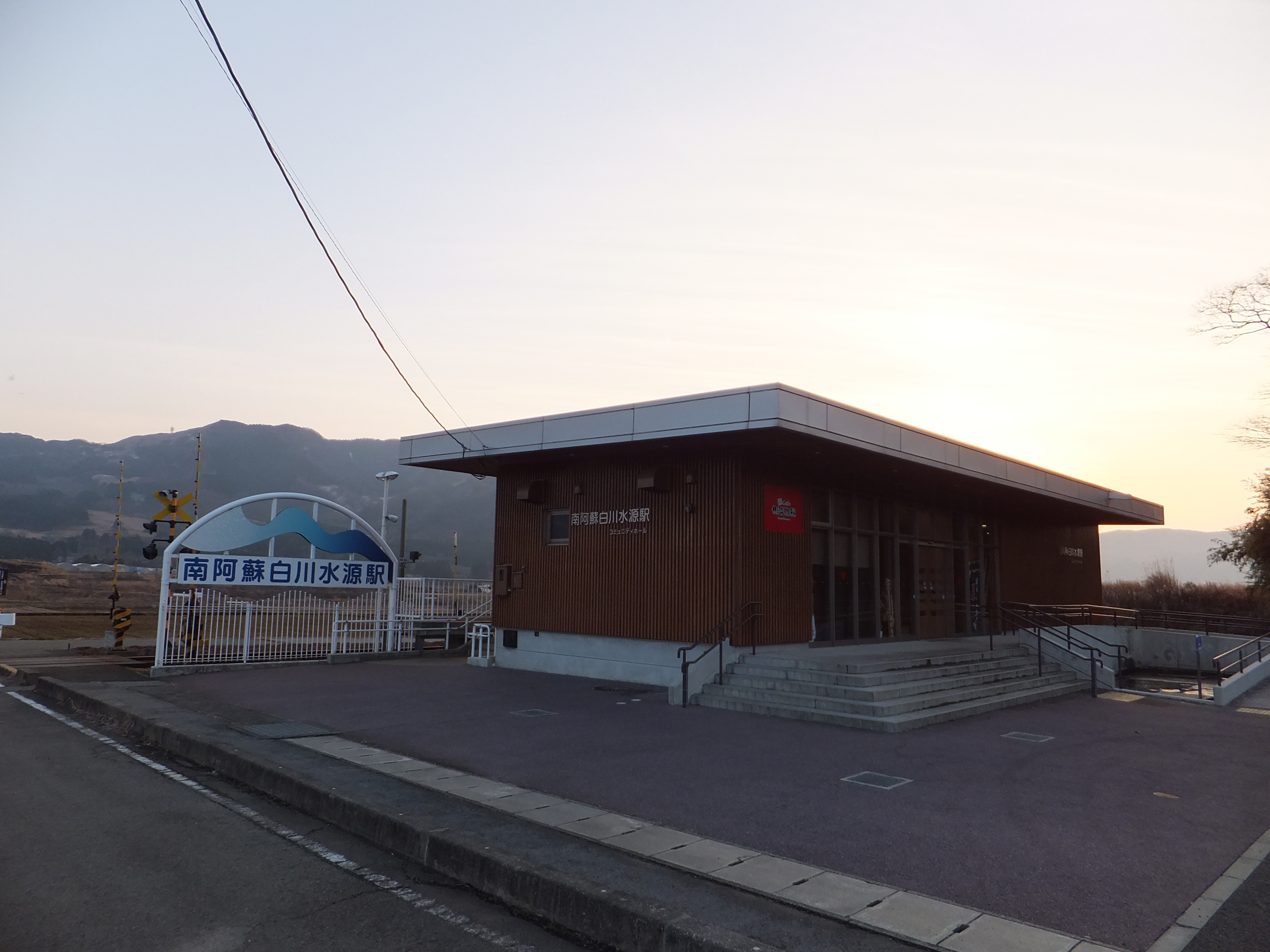
Station building (January 2017)

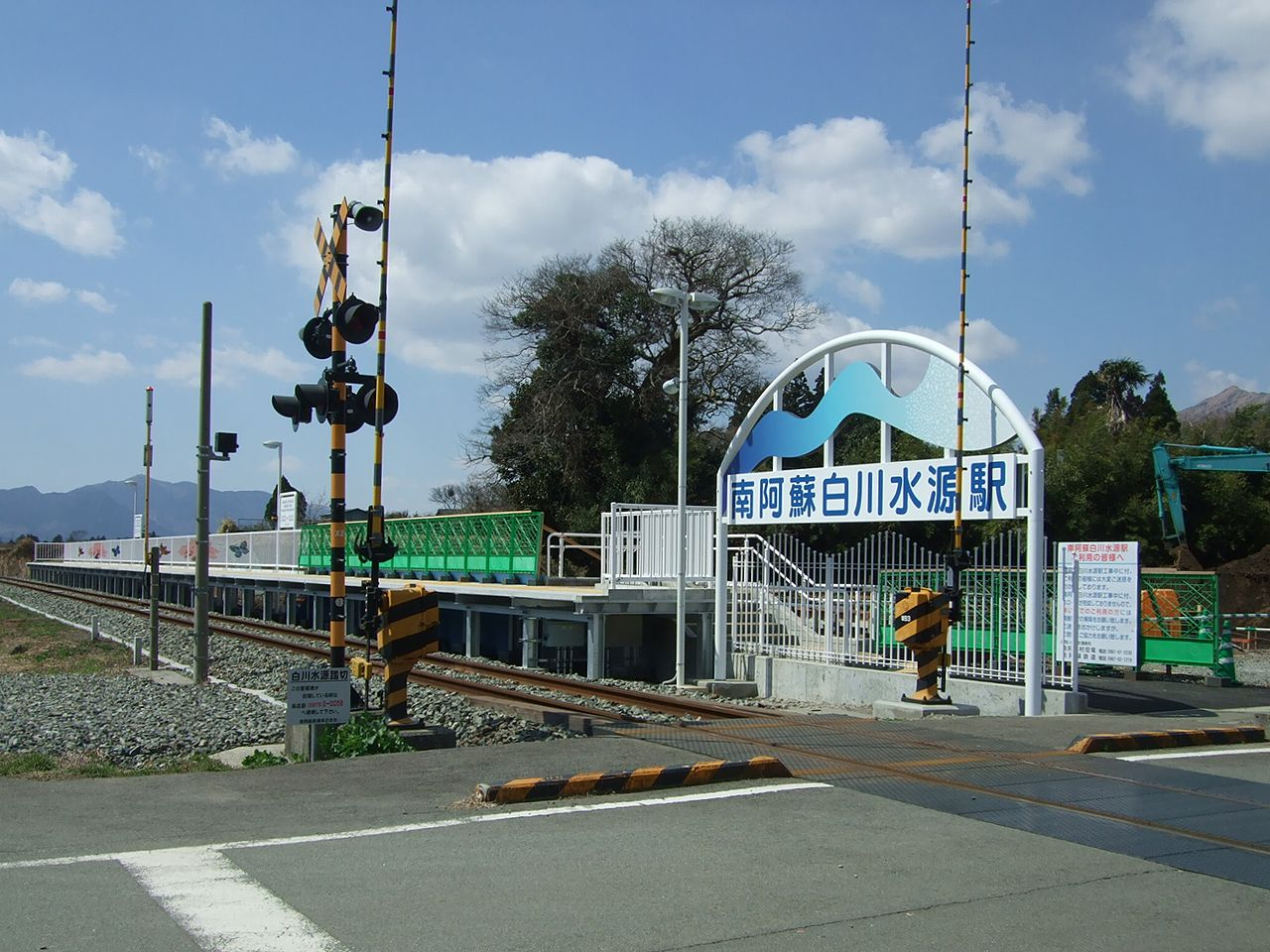
Platform at the time of opening (March 2012)

== History ==
The station was opened on 17 March 2012 and the station building completed on 22 July 2012. Following the damage to bridges and tunnels on the Takamori line from severe earthquakes in April 2016, the entire line was shut down from14–16 April 2016, Service was resumed on 31 July of the same year.

Following the damage from severe earthquakes in April 2016, the entire Takamori Line was shut down. Service was resumed in July of the same year.

== Passenger statistics ==
In fiscal 2015, the station was used by an average of 36 passengers daily.

== Surrounding area ==
- Shirakawa Springs

== See also ==
- List of railway stations in Japan
