= Minamiaso, Kumamoto =

Minamiaso 南阿蘇村
- Village
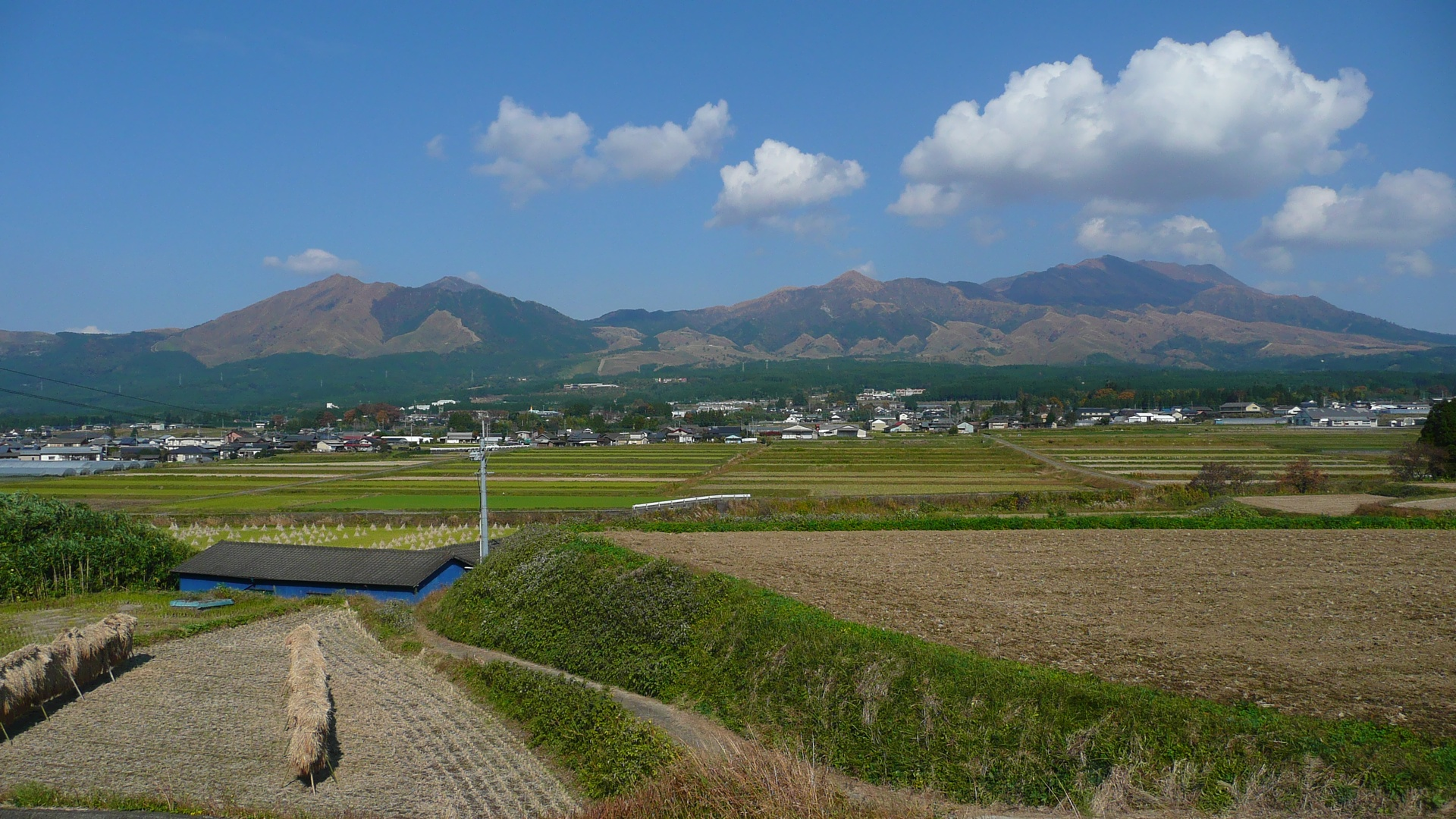
- View of Mount Aso from Minami-Aso

- Flag Chapter
- Interactive map of Minamiaso
- Location in Japan
- Coordinates: 32°49′N 131°2′E
- Country: Japan
- Region: Kyushu
- Prefecture: Kumamoto
- District: Aso

Government
  - Mayor: Seiichi Kira (since 2017)

Area
  - Total: 137.32 km^{2} (53.02 sq mi)

Population (July 31, 2024)
  - Total: 10,071
  - Density: 73.340/km^{2} (189.95/sq mi)
- Time zone: UTC+09:00 (JST)
- City hall address: 145-3 Kain, Minamiaso-mura, Aso-gun, Kumamoto-ken 869-1411
- Climate: Cfa
- Website: Official website
- Symbols
- Bird: Emberiza cioides
- Flower: Pieris japonica
- Tree: Chamaecyparis obtusa

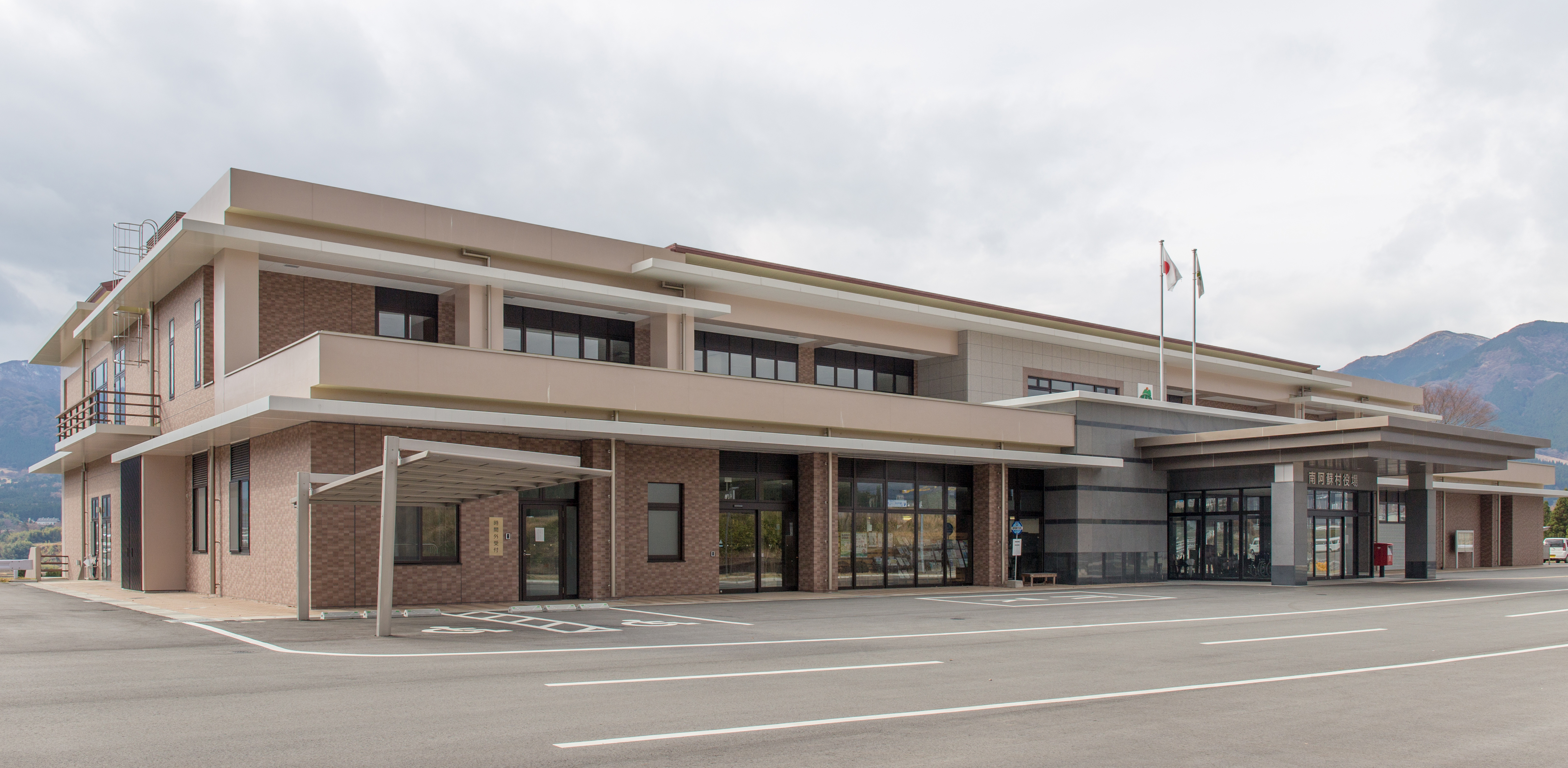
Minamiaso Village Hall

Minamiaso (南阿蘇村, Minamiaso-mura; literally "South Aso") is a village in Aso District, Kumamoto Prefecture, Japan. As of 31 July 2024, the village had an estimated population of 10,071 in 4821 households, and a population density of 73 persons per km^{2}. The total area of the village is 137.32 km^{2} (53.02 sq mi).

== Geography ==
Minamiaso Village is located in the southern part of the Aso Caldera, in the Nango Valley between the Five Peaks of Aso and the outer rim of the volcano. On both sides of the Shirakawa River, which runs from east to west through the urban center, are residential and commercial areas, and cultivated land. Most of the area above 600 meters in elevation is covered by forests.

=== Neighboring municipalities ===
Kumamoto Prefecture

- Aso
- Nishihara
- Ōzu
- Takamori
- Yamato

=== Climate ===
Minamiaso has a humid subtropical climate (Köppen climate classification Cfa) with hot summers and cool winters. Precipitation is high, but there is a pronounced difference between the wetter summers and drier winters. The average annual temperature in Minamiaso is 14.4 °C (57.9 °F). The average annual rainfall is 2,922.8 mm (115.07 in) with July as the wettest month. The temperatures are highest on average in August, at around 25.5 °C (77.9 °F), and lowest in January, at around 3.7 °C (38.7 °F). The highest temperature ever recorded in Minamiaso was 36.4 °C (97.5 °F) on 3 August 2024; the coldest temperature ever recorded was −10.0 °C (14.0 °F) on 24 January 2016 and 8 January 2021.

Climate data for Minamiaso (2015−2020 normals, extremes 2015−present)
Month	Jan	Feb	Mar	Apr	May	Jun	Jul	Aug	Sep	Oct	Nov	Dec	Year
Record high °C (°F)	19.2 (66.6)	20.8 (69.4)	24.4 (75.9)	28.3 (82.9)	31.2 (88.2)	33.9 (93.0)	36.1 (97.0)	36.4 (97.5)	33.9 (93.0)	30.7 (87.3)	26.0 (78.8)	21.9 (71.4)	36.4 (97.5)
Mean daily maximum °C (°F)	8.7 (47.7)	9.9 (49.8)	14.3 (57.7)	19.4 (66.9)	24.2 (75.6)	25.9 (78.6)	29.4 (84.9)	31.1 (88.0)	26.7 (80.1)	22.3 (72.1)	17.0 (62.6)	10.9 (51.6)	20.0 (68.0)
Daily mean °C (°F)	3.7 (38.7)	4.5 (40.1)	8.3 (46.9)	13.5 (56.3)	18.1 (64.6)	21.2 (70.2)	24.8 (76.6)	25.5 (77.9)	21.7 (71.1)	16.3 (61.3)	10.6 (51.1)	5.3 (41.5)	14.5 (58.0)
Mean daily minimum °C (°F)	−1.0 (30.2)	−0.5 (31.1)	2.4 (36.3)	7.5 (45.5)	12.4 (54.3)	17.0 (62.6)	21.2 (70.2)	21.2 (70.2)	17.6 (63.7)	11.0 (51.8)	4.9 (40.8)	0.1 (32.2)	9.5 (49.1)
Record low °C (°F)	−10.0 (14.0)	−9.3 (15.3)	−5.3 (22.5)	−1.7 (28.9)	1.8 (35.2)	10.0 (50.0)	14.5 (58.1)	15.4 (59.7)	6.8 (44.2)	1.5 (34.7)	−4.7 (23.5)	−7.4 (18.7)	−10.0 (14.0)
Average precipitation mm (inches)	96.8 (3.81)	127.7 (5.03)	145.7 (5.74)	196.8 (7.75)	215.8 (8.50)	639.3 (25.17)	656.4 (25.84)	204.2 (8.04)	294.9 (11.61)	136.0 (5.35)	99.3 (3.91)	109.9 (4.33)	2,922.8 (115.07)
Average snowfall cm (inches)	4 (1.6)	5 (2.0)	trace	0 (0)	0 (0)	0 (0)	0 (0)	0 (0)	0 (0)	0 (0)	0 (0)	trace	9 (3.5)
Average precipitation days (≥ 1.0 mm)	7.0	9.5	11.3	10.8	10.7	15.8	14.8	11.0	13.8	9.3	9.0	8.0	131
Average snowy days (≥ 3 cm)	0.5	0.5	0	0	0	0	0	0	0	0	0	0	1
Mean monthly sunshine hours	97.9	118.9	165.0	175.0	196.3	124.2	146.3	204.5	122.8	158.2	140.2	116.9	1,766.1
Source: Japan Meteorological Agency

== Demographics ==
Per Japanese census data, the population of Minamiaso in 2020 is 9,836 people. Minamiaso has been conducting censuses since 1960.

Historical population

Year	Pop.	±%
1960	16,485	—
1965	14,636	−11.2%
1970	13,087	−10.6%
1975	12,797	−2.2%
1980	13,010	+1.7%
1985	13,285	+2.1%
1990	12,643	−4.8%

Year	Pop.	±%
1995	12,864	+1.7%
2000	12,436	−3.3%
2005	12,254	−1.5%
2010	11,978	−2.3%
2015	11,503	−4.0%
2020	9,836	−14.5%

Minamiaso population statistics

== History ==
The area of Minamiaso was part of ancient Higo Province. In the Edo Period, it was part of the holdings of Kumamoto Domain. Following the Meiji restoration, the villages of Chōyō, Hakusui, and Kugino were established on April 1, 1889 with the creation of the modern municipalities system. Due to declining birth rate, aging population and the opportunity to share administrative resources, discussions between the three villages (Chōyō, Hakusui and Kugino) began on April 1, 2003. The merger was complete on February 13, 2005, forming the village of Minamiaso.

== Government ==
Minamiaso has a mayor-council form of government with a directly elected mayor and a unicameral village council of 14 members. Minamiaso, collectively with the other municipalities of Aso District, contributes one member to the Kumamoto Prefectural Assembly. In terms of national politics, the village is part of the Kumamoto 3rd district of the lower house of the Diet of Japan.

== Economy ==
The economy of Minamiaso is largely agricultural, with some tourism to its several hot spring resorts.

== Education ==
Minamiaso has three public elementary schools and one public junior high school operated by the village government. The village does not have a public high school, but there is one private high school.

== Transportation ==
=== Railways ===
JR Kyushu - Hōhi Main Line

- Tateno

Minamiaso Railway Company - Takamori Line

- Tateno - Choyo - Kase - Aso-Shimodajyō - Minamiaso Mizu-no-Umareru-Sato Hakusui-Kōgen - Nakamatsu - Aso-Shirakawa - Minamiaso-Shirakawasuigen - Miharashidai

=== Highway ===
- National Route 57
- National Route 325

== See also ==
- Aso Tateno Dam, dam located in the village
