= Minamiaso Railway Takamori Line =

Railway line in Kumamoto Prefecture, Japan

Takamori Line
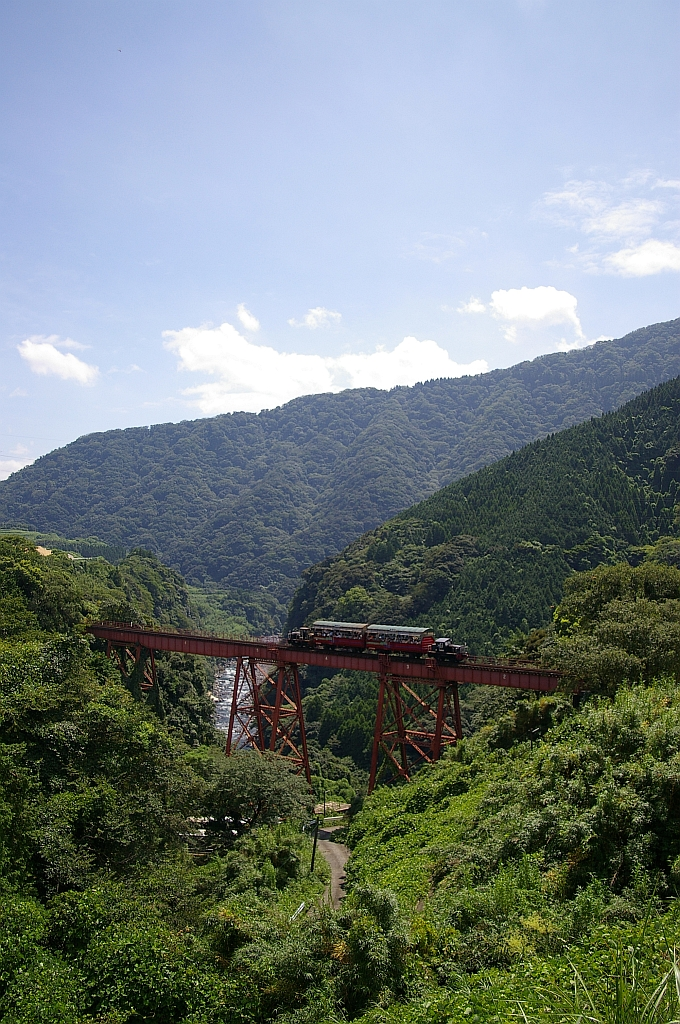
- Tateno Bridge with a scenic view

Overview
- Native name: 高森線
- Locale: Kumamoto Prefecture, Kyushu, Japan
- Termini: Tateno; Takamori
- Stations: 10
- Color on map: Green (#438D80)

Service
- Operator: Minamiaso Railway

History
- Opened: 12 February 1928; 98 years ago

Technical
- Line length: 17.7 km (11.0 mi)
- Track gauge: 1,067 mm (3 ft 6 in)
- Electrification: Not electrified
- Operating speed: 65 km/h (40 mph)

The Takamori Line (高森線, Takamori-sen) is a Japanese railway line in Kumamoto Prefecture, connecting Tateno Station in Minamiaso and Takamori Station in Takamori. It is the only railway line operated by third-sector railway company Minamiaso Railway (南阿蘇鉄道, Minamiaso Tetsudō; "South Aso Railway"). The line traverses the southern part of Mount Aso caldera.

== Stations ==
All stations are within Kumamoto Prefecture.

Name		Distance (km)	Connections	Location
Tateno	立野	0.0	JR Kyushu: ■ Hōhi Main Line	Minamiaso
Choyo	長陽	4.7		Minamiaso
Kase	加勢	5.7		Minamiaso
Aso-Shimodajō †	阿蘇下田城	7.2		Minamiaso
Minamiaso Mizu-no-Umareru-Sato Hakusui-Kōgen	南阿蘇水の生まれる里白水高原	9.1		Minamiaso
Nakamatsu	中松	10.5		Minamiaso
Aso-Shirakawa	阿蘇白川	13.5		Minamiaso
Minamiaso-Shirakawasuigen	南阿蘇白川水源	14.3		Minamiaso
Miharashidai	見晴台	16.1		Minamiaso
Takamori	高森	17.7		Takamori

† The station name of Aso-Shimodajō has changed three times:

- 12 February 1928: Aso-Shimoda (阿蘇下田)
- 1 August 1993: Aso-Shimodajō-Fureai-Onsen (阿蘇下田城ふれあい温泉)
- 15 July 2023: Aso-Shimodajō (阿蘇下田城)

With 22 kana, Minamiaso Mizu-no-Umareru-Sato Hakusui-Kōgen Station (南阿蘇水の生まれる里白水高原駅|南阿蘇水の生まれる里白水高原]) was tied with Chōjagahamashiosaihamanasukōenmae Station in Ibaraki Prefecture as the longest station name in Japan; however, since 2020, the record is held by Tōjiin Ritsumeikan University Station in Kyoto, with 26 kana.

== Earthquake closure and reopening ==
The entire Takamori Line was closed following significant damage to track and infrastructure following the Kumamoto earthquakes in April 2016. A section of the line between Nakamatsu and Takamori resumed service in July of the same year.

However, the section between Tateno and Nakamatsu could not be reopened because of extensive earthquake damage to the track. The Ministry of Land, Infrastructure, Transport and Tourism estimated that a complete restoration would cost between 6.5 and 7 billion yen. After work was completed to restore the railway, the full line re-opened on 15 July 2023. Major work to reopen the line included the complete rebuilding of the badly damaged No. 1 Shirakawa arch bridge.

== History ==
The single-track line was opened by the Japanese Government Railways in 1928. The only passing loop is at Nakamatsu. Freight services ceased in 1984. Minamiaso Railway took over the line from Japanese National Railways (JNR) on April 1, 1986. It uses a simplified automatic railway signalling system. The line is not electrified.

The MLIT tested a DMV railbus on the line in November 2007.

=== Uncompleted extension ===
After the Takachiho line opened in 1972, construction of the 23 km (14 mi) section to Takamori continued until 1975 when flooding in the 6,500 m (21,300 ft) Takamori tunnel (7 km (4.3 mi) north of Takamori) resulted in work being suspended. Construction was formally abandoned in 1980.

== See also ==
- List of railway companies in Japan
- List of railway lines in Japan
- Aso Tateno Dam
