= Takamori, Kumamoto =

Takamori 高森町
- Town
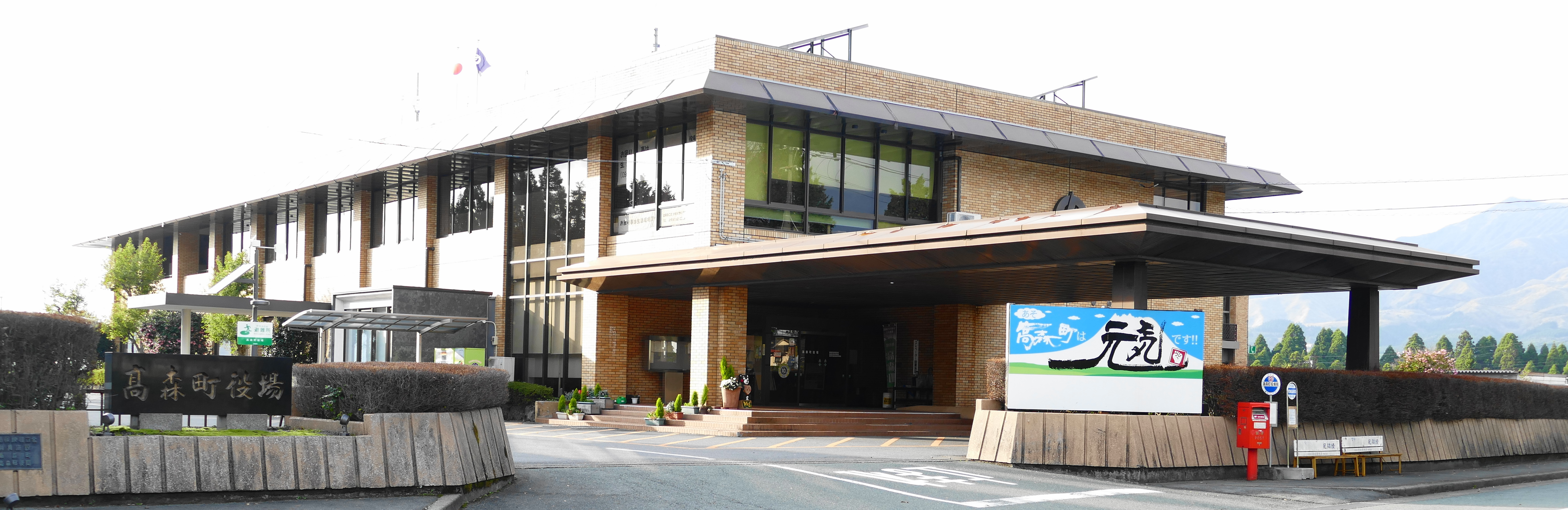
- Takamori town hall

- Flag Seal
- Location of Takamori in Kumamoto Prefecture

- Location in Japan
- Coordinates: 32°49′38″N 131°7′19″E
- Country: Japan
- Region: Kyushu
- Prefecture: Kumamoto
- District: Aso

Area
  - Total: 175.06 km^{2} (67.59 sq mi)

Population (October 1, 2016)
  - Total: 5,889
  - Density: 33.64/km^{2} (87.13/sq mi)
- Time zone: UTC+09:00 (JST)
- City hall address: 2168 Ōji-Takamori, Takamori-machi, Aso-gun, Kumamoto-ken 869-1602
- Climate: Cfa
- Website: Official website
- Symbols
- Flower: Lilium
- Tree: Prunus serrulata

Takamori (高森町, Takamori-machi) is a town located in Aso District, Kumamoto Prefecture, Japan. As of 1 August 2024, the town had an estimated population of 5889 in 2965 households, and a population density of 34 persons per km^{2}. The total area of the town is 175.06 km^{2} (67.59 sq mi).

== Geography ==
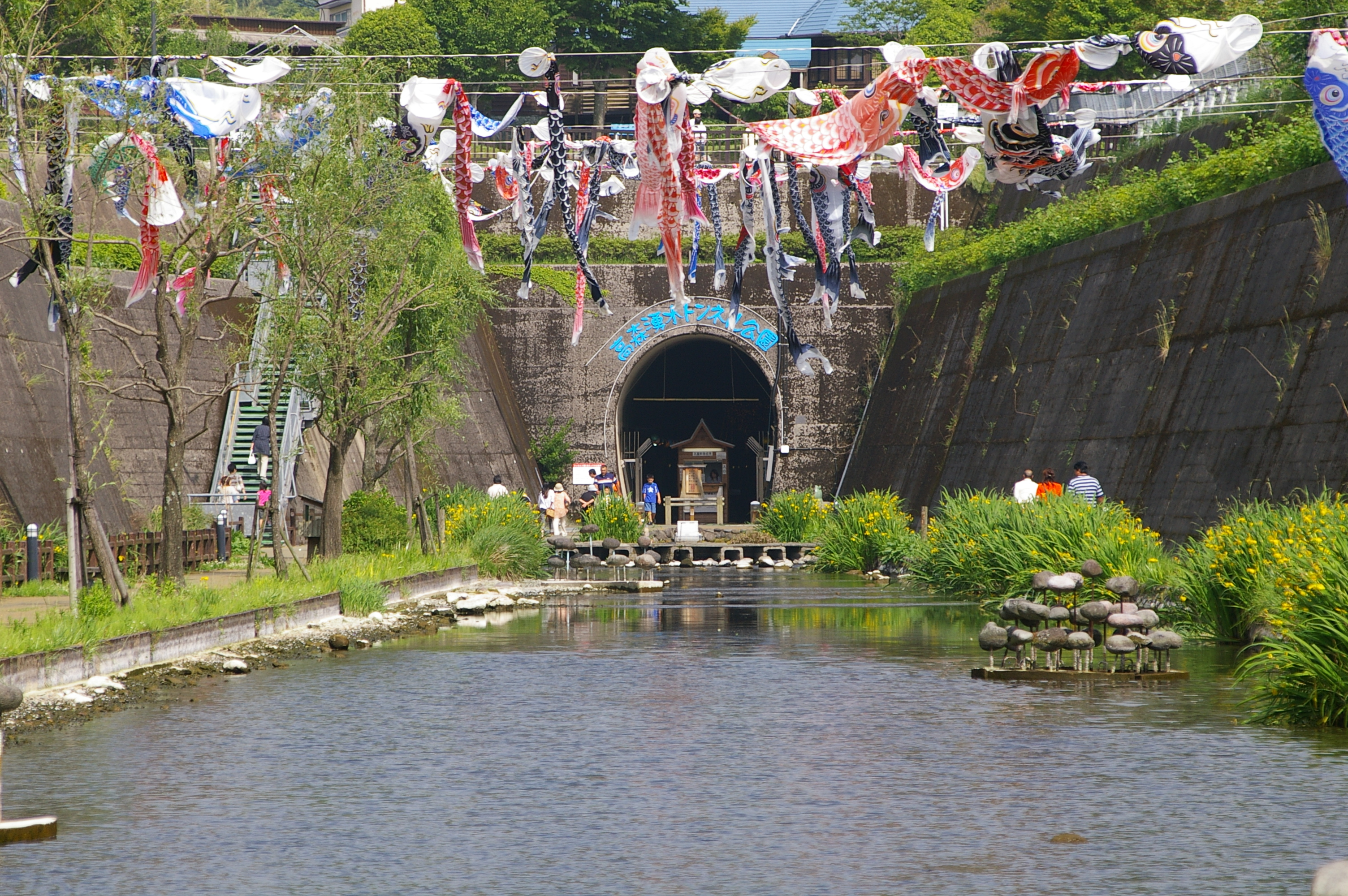
Takamori Spring Tunnel Park in May

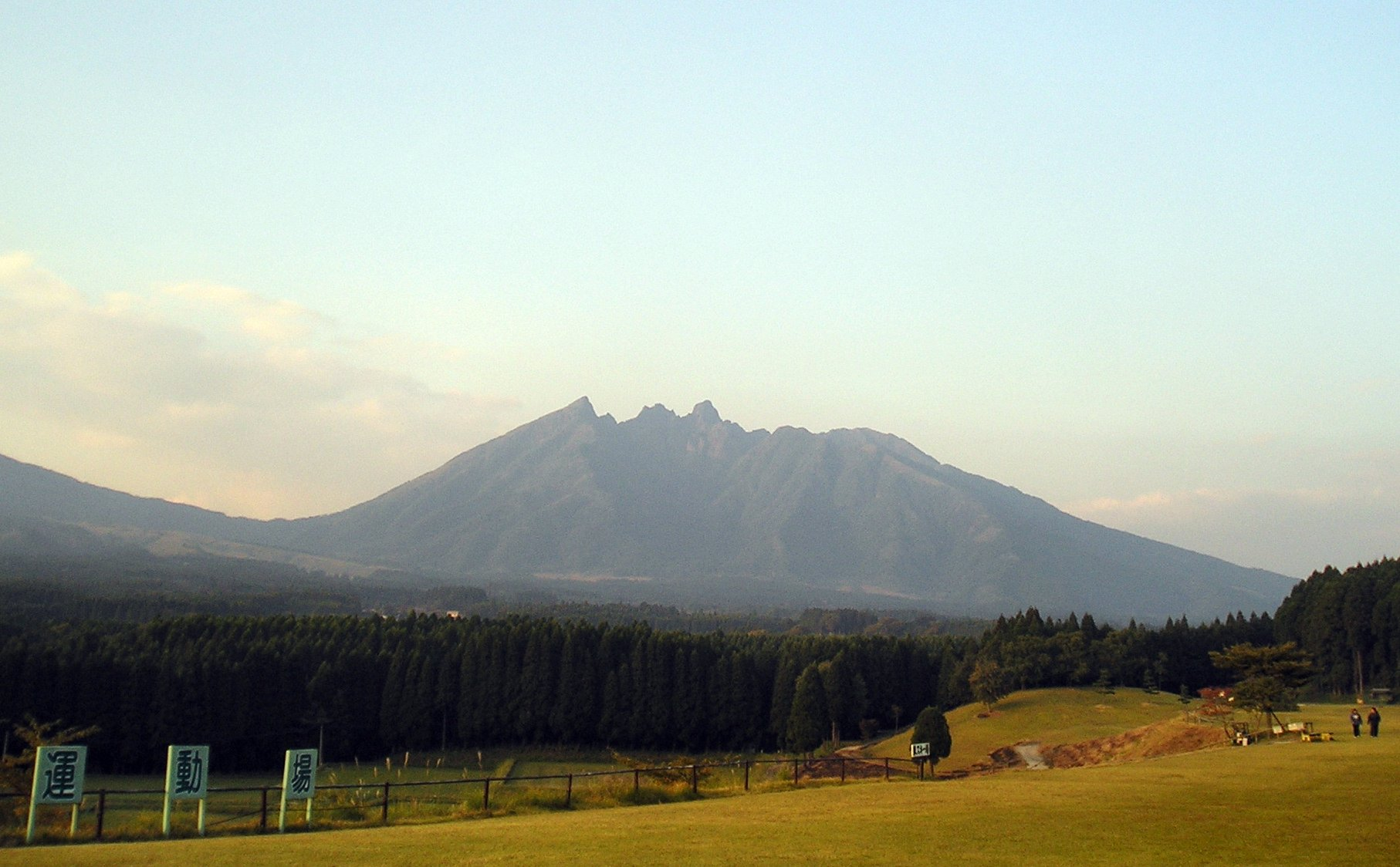
Mt. Nekodake

Takamori is located at the easternmost point of Kumamoto Prefecture, within the caldera of Mount Aso. It touches Ōita prefecture to the northeast and Miyazaki prefecture to the east. The town is divided into four areas, called Takamori, Shikimi, Kusakabe, and Nojiri. The city hall is situated in the Takamori area, where over half of the town population resides.

- Mountains: Mount Aso, Nakadake, Nekodake, Takadake, Kishimadake, Eboshidake
- Rivers: Shirakawa

=== Surrounding municipalities ===
Kumamoto Prefecture

- Aso
- Minamiaso
- Yamato

Miyazaki Prefecture

- Takachiho

Ōita Prefecture

- Taketa

=== Climate ===
Takamori has a humid subtropical climate (Köppen climate classification Cfa) with hot, humid summers and cool winters. There is significant precipitation throughout the year, especially during June and July. The average annual temperature in Takamori is 13.4 °C (56.1 °F). The average annual rainfall is 2,435.1 mm (95.87 in) with June as the wettest month. The temperatures are highest on average in August, at around 24.3 °C (75.7 °F), and lowest in January, at around 2.2 °C (36.0 °F). The highest temperature ever recorded in Takamori was 35.8 °C (96.4 °F) on 2 August 2026; the coldest temperature ever recorded was −13.2 °C (8.2 °F) on 25 January 1998.

Climate data for Takamori (1991−2020 normals, extremes 1977−present)
Month	Jan	Feb	Mar	Apr	May	Jun	Jul	Aug	Sep	Oct	Nov	Dec	Year
Record high °C (°F)	18.8 (65.8)	20.8 (69.4)	25.9 (78.6)	28.0 (82.4)	31.0 (87.8)	34.2 (93.6)	34.9 (94.8)	35.8 (96.4)	33.3 (91.9)	29.3 (84.7)	24.7 (76.5)	21.0 (69.8)	35.8 (96.4)
Mean daily maximum °C (°F)	6.8 (44.2)	8.8 (47.8)	12.7 (54.9)	18.0 (64.4)	22.6 (72.7)	24.6 (76.3)	28.4 (83.1)	29.2 (84.6)	26.0 (78.8)	20.9 (69.6)	15.3 (59.5)	9.3 (48.7)	18.6 (65.4)
Daily mean °C (°F)	2.2 (36.0)	3.6 (38.5)	7.1 (44.8)	12.2 (54.0)	16.9 (62.4)	20.3 (68.5)	23.9 (75.0)	24.3 (75.7)	21.1 (70.0)	15.5 (59.9)	9.9 (49.8)	4.2 (39.6)	13.4 (56.2)
Mean daily minimum °C (°F)	−2.0 (28.4)	−1.1 (30.0)	2.0 (35.6)	6.6 (43.9)	11.7 (53.1)	16.5 (61.7)	20.5 (68.9)	20.8 (69.4)	17.2 (63.0)	10.8 (51.4)	4.9 (40.8)	−0.4 (31.3)	9.0 (48.1)
Record low °C (°F)	−13.2 (8.2)	−12.6 (9.3)	−8.6 (16.5)	−4.2 (24.4)	2.1 (35.8)	6.7 (44.1)	11.6 (52.9)	12.7 (54.9)	4.9 (40.8)	−1.4 (29.5)	−4.9 (23.2)	−9.5 (14.9)	−13.2 (8.2)
Average precipitation mm (inches)	74.6 (2.94)	105.9 (4.17)	156.7 (6.17)	164.1 (6.46)	189.7 (7.47)	536.0 (21.10)	447.9 (17.63)	229.5 (9.04)	250.5 (9.86)	113.1 (4.45)	91.5 (3.60)	75.5 (2.97)	2,435.1 (95.87)
Average precipitation days (≥ 1.0 mm)	8.1	9.6	12.2	11.4	10.5	16.2	15.5	12.8	11.5	8.4	8.3	8.3	132.8
Mean monthly sunshine hours	116.3	125.1	151.8	177.3	184.0	115.0	147.4	171.8	139.2	163.5	138.7	126.2	1,761.4
Source: Japan Meteorological Agency

=== Demographics ===
Per Japanese census data, the population of Takamori in 2020 is 5,789 people. Takamori has been conducting censuses since 1920.

Historical population

Year	Pop.	±%
1920	8,899	—
1925	9,387	+5.5%
1930	10,035	+6.9%
1935	10,838	+8.0%
1940	10,202	−5.9%
1945	12,721	+24.7%
1950	13,002	+2.2%
1955	13,792	+6.1%
1960	13,652	−1.0%
1965	12,045	−11.8%
1970	10,444	−13.3%

Year	Pop.	±%
1975	9,352	−10.5%
1980	8,806	−5.8%
1985	8,531	−3.1%
1990	8,069	−5.4%
1995	7,703	−4.5%
2000	7,300	−5.2%
2005	7,081	−3.0%
2010	6,718	−5.1%
2015	6,325	−5.8%
2020	5,789	−8.5%

Takamori population statistics

== History ==
The area of Takamori was part of ancient Higo Province, During the Edo Period it was part of the holdings of Kumamoto Domain. After the Meiji restoration, the town of Takamori was established on April 1, 1889 with the creation of the modern municipalities system.

== Government ==
Takamori has a mayor-council form of government with a directly elected mayor and a unicameral town council of ten members. Takamori, collectively with the other municipalities in Aso District, contributes one member to the Kumamoto Prefectural Assembly. In terms of national politics, the town is part of the Kumamoto 3rd district of the lower house of the Diet of Japan.

== Economy ==
The main industries of Takamori are agriculture, forestry, and tourism. Agriculture has developed through field crops, rice cultivation, flower and tobacco production, livestock farming, and forestry. In recent years, the branding of highland vegetables such as radishes and cabbages has been promoted, and watermelon and melon production has also become popular.

== Education ==
Takamori has one public elementary school and one public junior high school operated by the town government and one public high school operated by the Kumamoto Prefectural Board of Education.

== Transportation ==
=== Railways ===
Minamiaso Railway Company - Takamori Line

- Takamori

=== Highway ===
- National Route 265
- National Route 325
- National Route 503
