= Nakamatsu Station =

Railway station located in Minamiaso, Kumamoto

Nakamatsu Station 中松駅
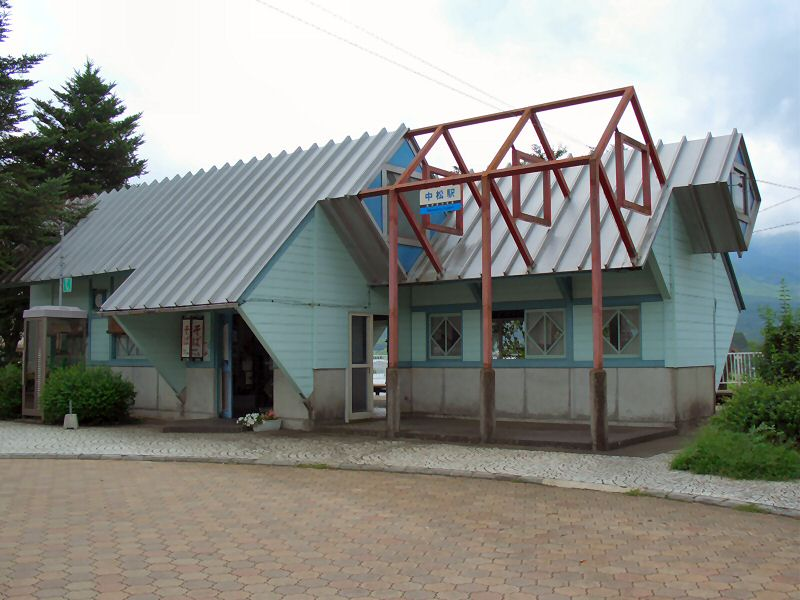
- Station entrance

General information
- Location: Minamiaso, Kumamoto; Japan
- Coordinates: 32.8274°N 131.0536°E
- Operator: Minamiaso Railway
- Line: ■ Takamori Line
- Distance: 10.5 km (from Tateno Station)
- Platforms: 2 side platforms

Construction
- Structure type: At-grade

Other information
- Status: Unstaffed

History
- Opened: 12 February 1928

Services
Preceding station	Mimamiaso Railway	Following station
Minamiaso Mizu-no-Umareru-Sato Hakusui-Kōgen towards Tateno	Takamori Line	Aso-Shirakawa towards Takamori
Location

Nakamatsu Station (中松駅, Nakamatsu-eki) is a railway station in Minamiaso, Kumamoto Prefecture, Japan. It is on the Takamori Line, operated by the Minamiaso Railway.

== History ==
- 12 February, 1928 - Station opened for business.
- 1 April 1986, - the station was converted from the Takamori Line of the Japanese National Railways to Minamiaso Railway.
- 1 April 1987, - Start of use of new station building.
- 1 August 1989, - Set up a train exchange facility, The station platform will have two platforms and two tracks
- 14–16 April 2016, - the Kumamoto earthquakes caused damage to bridges and tunnels on the Takamori line, and operations have since been suspended.
- 31 July 2016, - Operation resumed between Nakamatsu and Takamori.
- 15 July 2023, - Minami Aso Railway Takamori Line between Tateno and Nakamatsu has been restored and all lines have resumed operation.
