= Tateno Station (Kumamoto) =

Railway station in Minamiaso, Kumamoto Prefecture, Japan

Tateno Station 立野駅
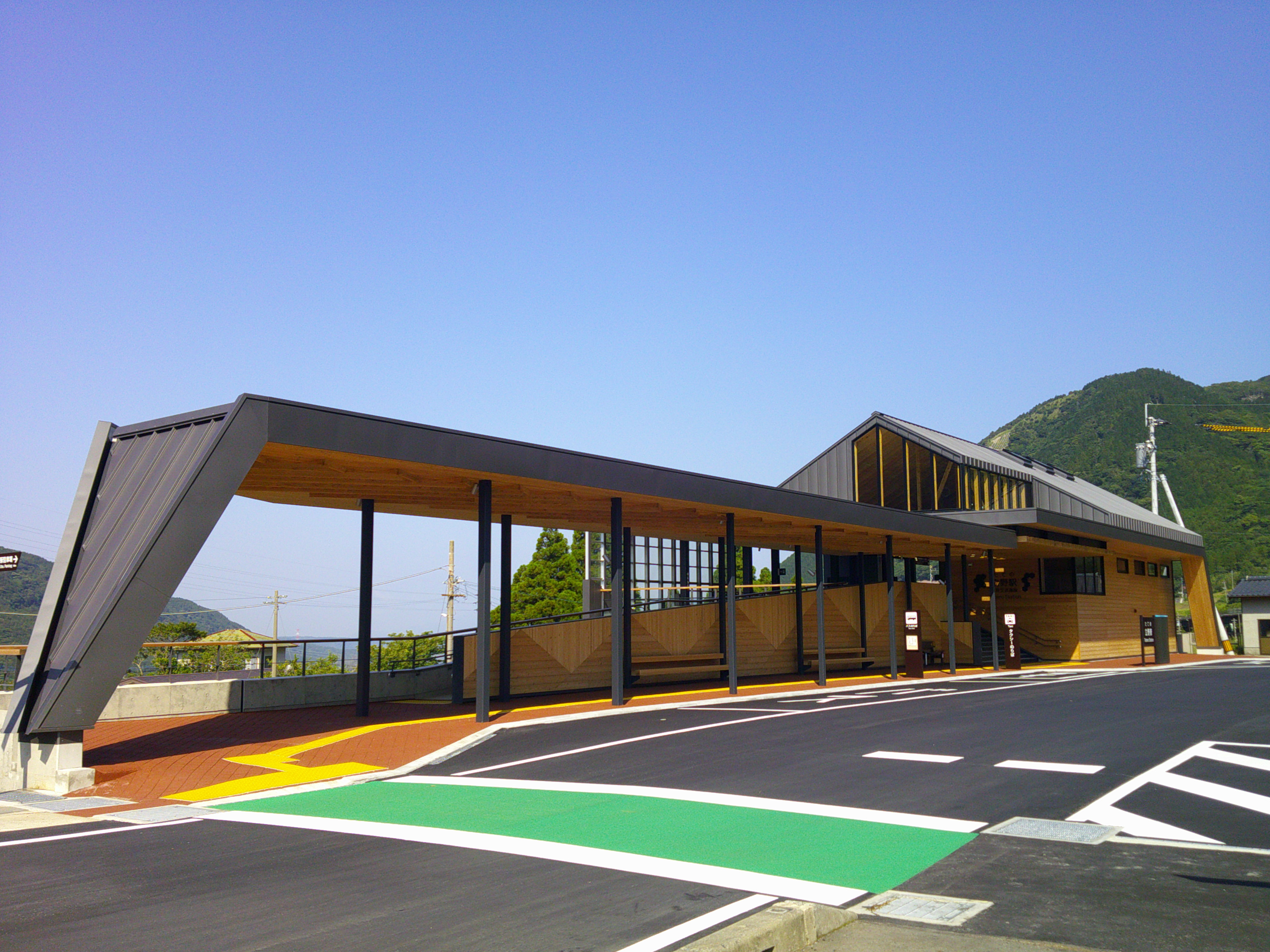
- New station building completed in 2023

General information
- Location: Tateno, Minamiaso Village, Aso District, Kumamoto Prefecture; Japan
- Coordinates: 32°52′40″N 130°57′55″E
- Operator: JR Kyushu; Minami Aso Railway
- Lines: Hōhi Main Line; Takamori Line
- Distance: 27.2 km (16.9 mi) from Kumamoto (Hōhi Main Line); 0.0 km (starting point of the Minami Aso Takamori Line)
- Platforms: 2 island platforms
- Tracks: 3 + several sidings

Construction
- Structure type: At grade
- Parking: Available at station forecourt

Other information
- Status: Unstaffed, service suspended
- Website: Official website

History
- Opened: 11 November 1916; 109 years ago

Services
Preceding station	JR Kyushu	Following station
Seta towards Kumamoto	Hōhi Main Line	Akamizu towards Ōita
Preceding station	Mimamiaso Railway	Following station
Terminus	Takamori Line	Chōyō towards Takamori
Location
- Location within Kumamoto Prefecture Location within Kyushu Location within Japan

Tateno Station (立野駅, Tateno-eki) is a railway station in Minamiaso, Kumamoto, Japan. It is jointly operated by JR Kyushu and the Minami Aso Railway and is a transfer station between the JR Kyushu Hōhi Main Line and the Minami Aso Takamori Line. The station has a three-stage switchback that trains need to execute in order to proceed to Akamizu, the next station on the Hōhi Main Line.

== History ==
On 21 June 1914, the Japanese Government Railways (JGR) opened the Miyaji Light Rail Line (宮地軽便線), later known as the Miyaji Line, running from Kumamoto eastward to Higo-Ōzu. The line was extended eastward in phases, with Tateno opening as the new eastern terminal on 11 November 1916. It became a through-station on 25 January 1918 when the track was extended further to Miyaji.

On 12 February 1928, the section between Tateno and Takamori was opened as a branch line of the Miyaji Line. By 2 December 1928, the track at Miyaji was linked to the Inukai Line (犬飼線), which had been extended westward in phases from Ōita since 1914. Through traffic was established between Kumamoto and Ōita. The two lines were merged, and the entire stretch was renamed the Hōhi Main Line. On the same day, the Miyaji Line branch between Tateno and Takamori was separated and became the Takamori Line.

On 1 April 1986, the Takamori Line was transferred from the Japanese National Railways (JNR) to the Minami Aso Railway, operated by the third sector. With the privatization of JNR on 1 April 1987, the station came under the control of JR Kyushu.

On 14 April 2016, operations at the station were suspended due to landslides caused by the Kumamoto earthquake. On 8 August 2020, Tateno Station reopened for JR services following the resumption of operations between Higo-Ōzu and Aso on the JR Hōhi Main Line. The new Tateno station building was completed on 31 March 2023.

On 15 July 2023, the Minami Aso Railway Takamori Line between Tateno and Nakamatsu was restored, and all lines resumed operation. Minami Aso Railway trains began direct service to JR Higo-Ōzu Station via this station.

== Lines ==
The station is served by the Hōhi Main Line and is located 32.3 km (20.1 mi) from the starting point of the line at Kumamoto. It is also the starting point of the Takamori Line.

== Layout ==
The station is jointly used by JR Kyushu, which has an island platform with two tracks, and the Minami Aso Railway, which has a single platform with one track. Although it is an unstaffed station, the station building is equipped with elevators and ramps. Toilets are installed on both the waiting room floor and the platform floor, with a multipurpose toilet located on the waiting room floor.

JR Tateno station platform

The JR Tateno Station platform is an above-ground station with one platform and two tracks. To access the platform, passengers descend from the station building to the lower floor and cross the railroad crossing on the premises. Before the earthquake, access to the platform was via a connecting staircase from the station square, followed by crossing the railroad tracks inside the JR station building on the right.

The platform was originally 120 meters (393.7 ft) long before restoration work after the earthquake, but it was shortened to 91 meters (298.5 ft) during the restoration. The damaged shed was replaced with a new one. Additionally, the station building housing the waiting room was demolished in March 2020, and the automatic ticket vending machine was moved to the platform.

The railroad crossing on the premises is designed to prevent trains from deviating onto the depot line. It currently serves as a safety measure to prevent trains from entering Platform 1 (Higo-Ōzu) from the Minami Aso Railway Takamori Line.

Minami-Aso Railway Tateno Station platform

Tateno Station on the Minami Aso Railway is an above-ground station with one track per platform. The Minami Aso Railway platform, which was renovated in 2023, is located behind the connecting stairs that descend from the station building. On the west side of the platform (towards the JR platform), there is a connection point between the storage track and the Hōhi Line.

The station office and trolley train ticket office are located on the Minami Aso Railway platform, as they were before the earthquake. The Takamori Line platform, which was the same as the JR platform before the earthquake, is to the left after descending the connecting stairs from the station square. Additionally, the Minami Aso Railway Tateno Station bookstore was built on the Takamori Line platform.

=== Past station structure ===
The station consists of two island platforms serving three tracks. The station forecourt and parking area are located at a higher level than the platforms. From there, a flight of steps descends to the first island platform. The station buildings for both the Minami Aso Railway and JR Kyushu are located on this platform, which also serves the Takamori Line.

From the JR Kyushu station, a level crossing provides access to the other island platform, which serves two Hōhi Main Line tracks. Both station buildings are unstaffed and serve as waiting rooms. A souvenir shop is located in the station forecourt.

=== Tracks ===
Track number	Route name	Destination	Remarks
Minami Aso Railway Platform
-	■Takamori Line	for Minamiaso-Shirakawasuigen and Takamori	The platform for the last train on the Takamori Line is located on the JR platform, from which direct trains to Higo-Ōzu arrive and depart.
JR Platform
1	■Hōhi Main Line	for Higo-Ōzu and Kumamoto	The platform for direct trains from the Takamori Line to the Hōhi Line.
2	■Hōhi Main Line	for Aso and Ōita	The platform for direct trains from the Hōhi Line to the Takamori Line.

== Gallery ==
Before the 2016 earthquake

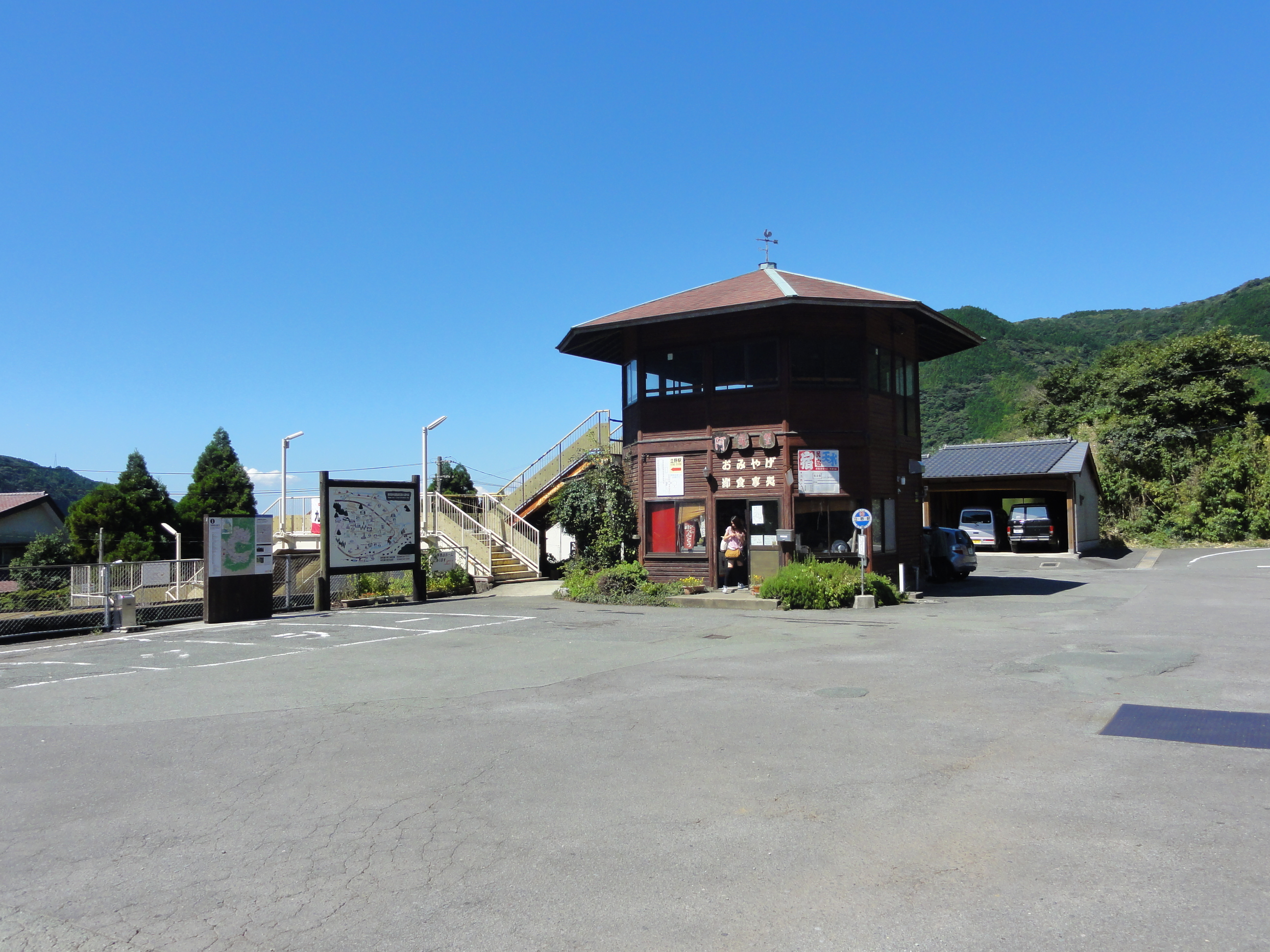
Station forecourt. Note the souvenir shop and the stairs leading to the platform.

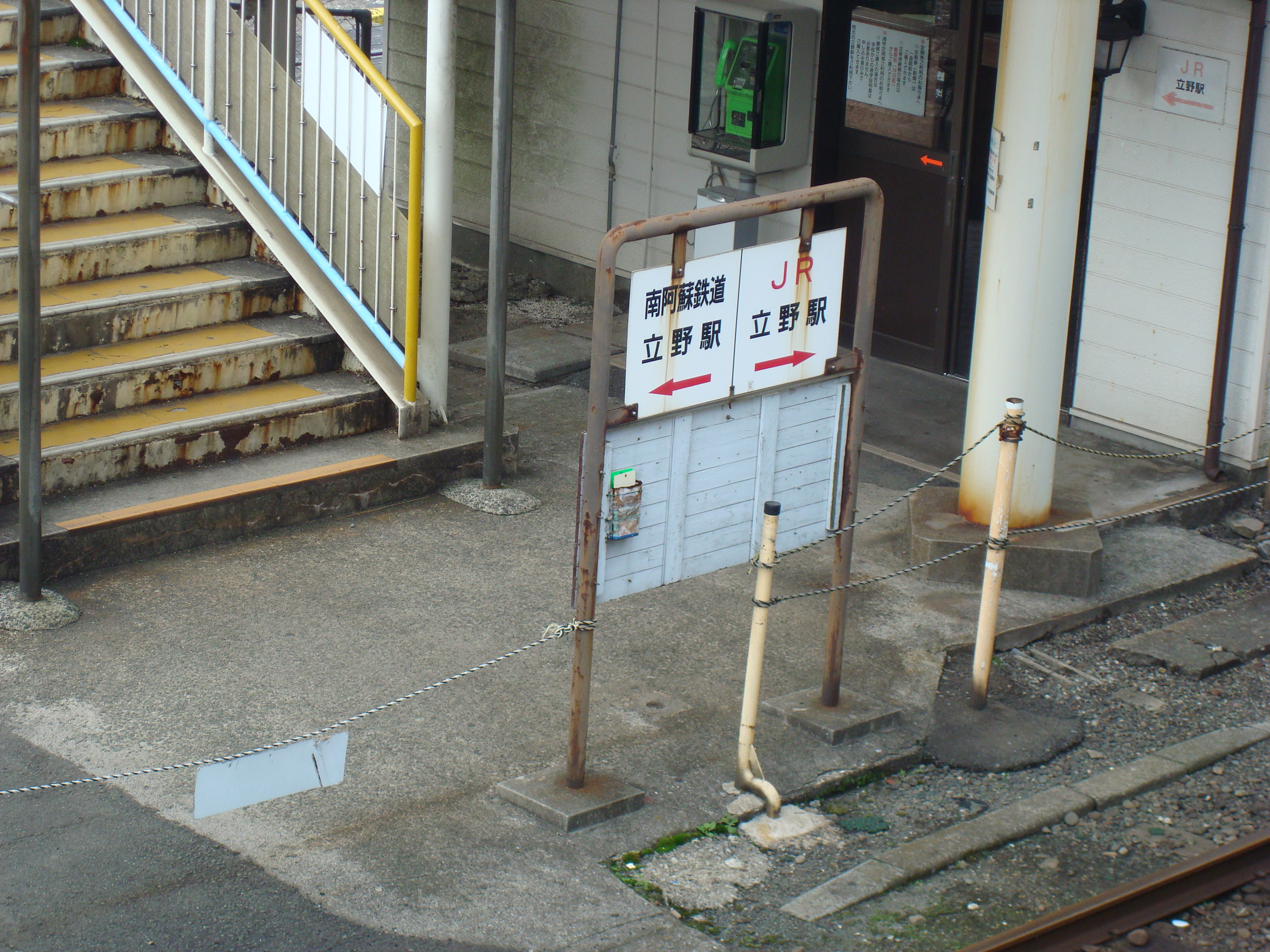
Base of the stairs from forecourt. To the right is the JR station entrance. To the left, the Miniami Aso station.

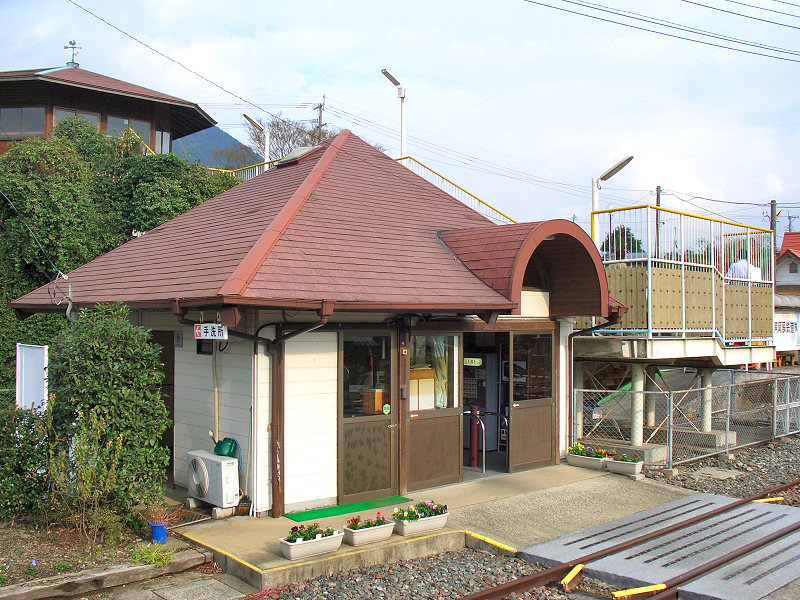
JR Tateno Station, Second Generation Station Building

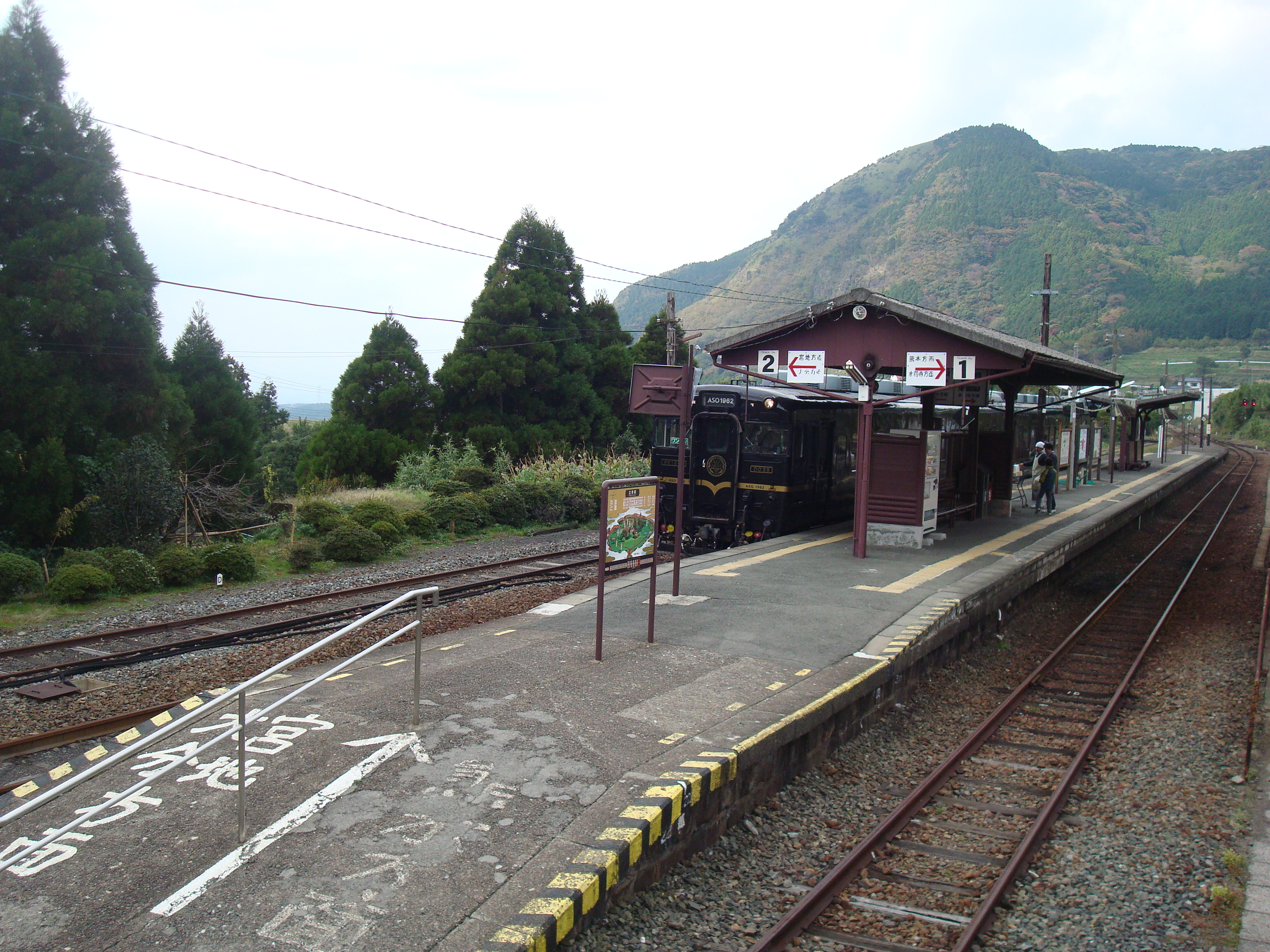
The second island platform, used exclusively by JR trains.

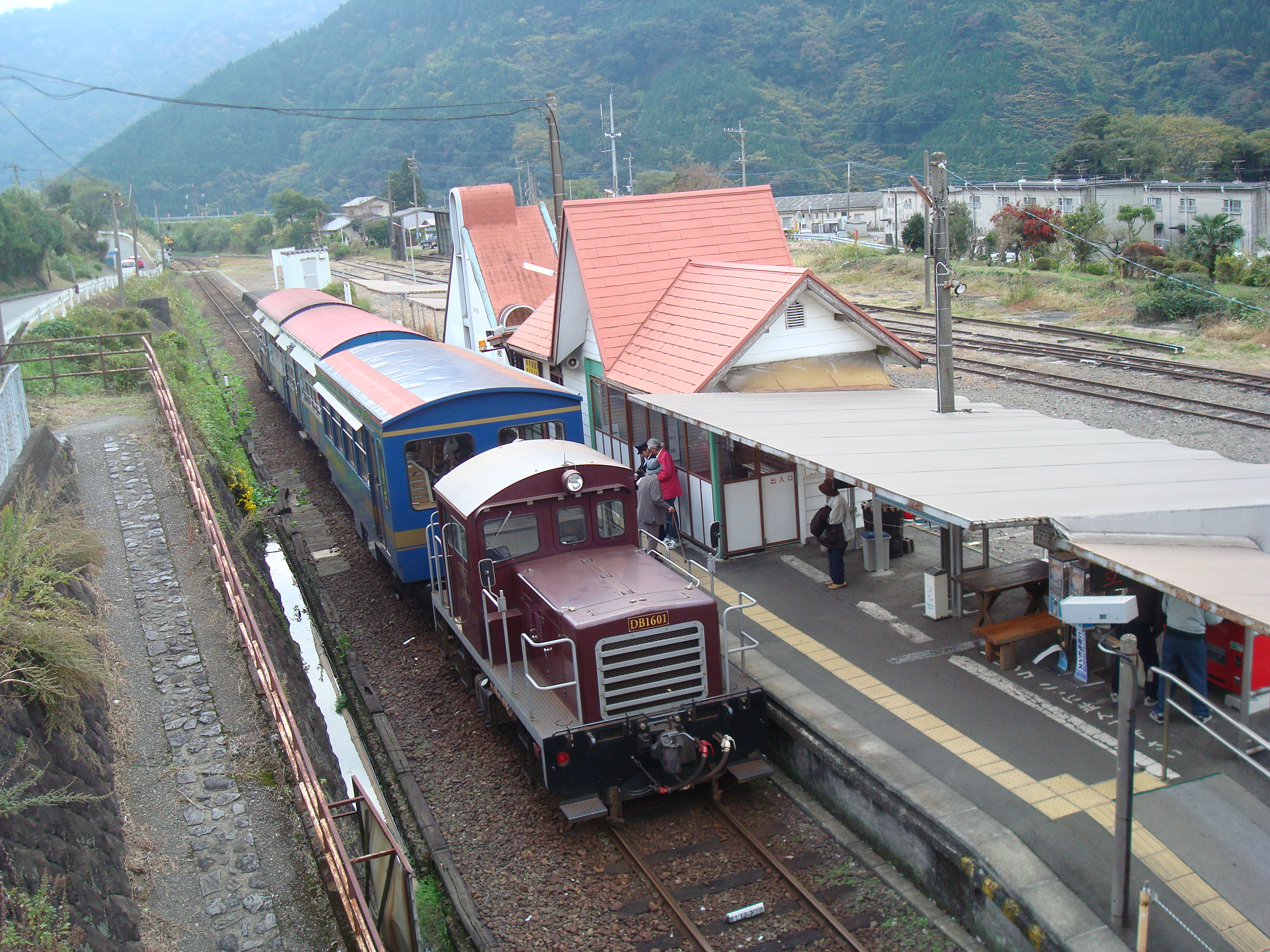
The Minami Aso Railway platform. The JR station is to the extreme right, outside the camera view.

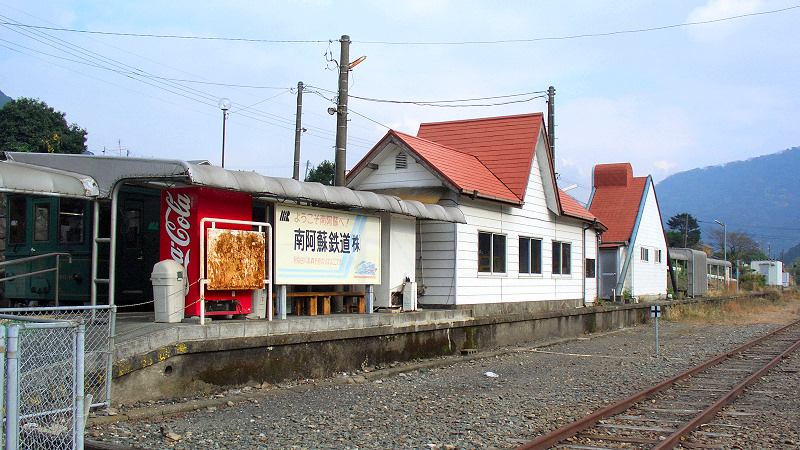
The rear of the Minami Aso station building. The track in the foreground is JR's.

Schematic of station layout. Gray is the station forecourt. The narrow blue rectangle is the Miniami Aso platform, the thick blue is the JR Kyushu.

After station reopening in 2020

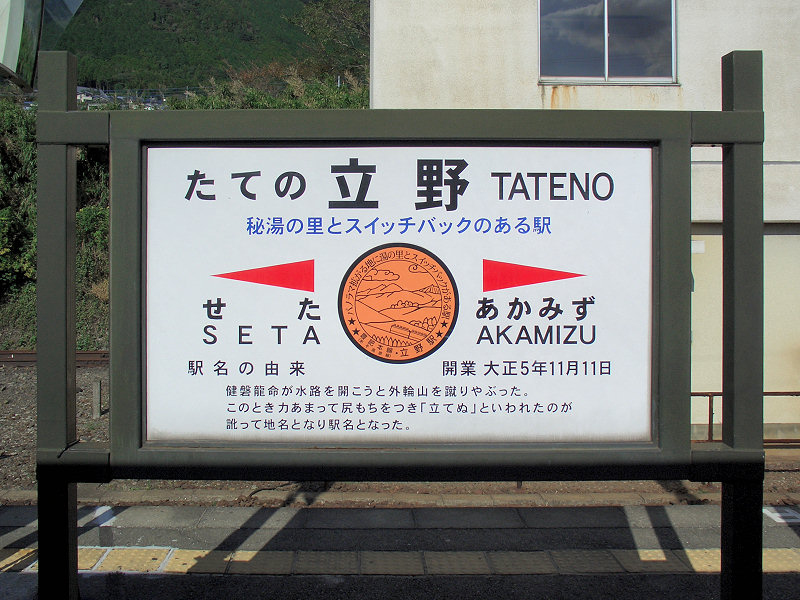
JR station name sign associated with Mt. Aso and switchback

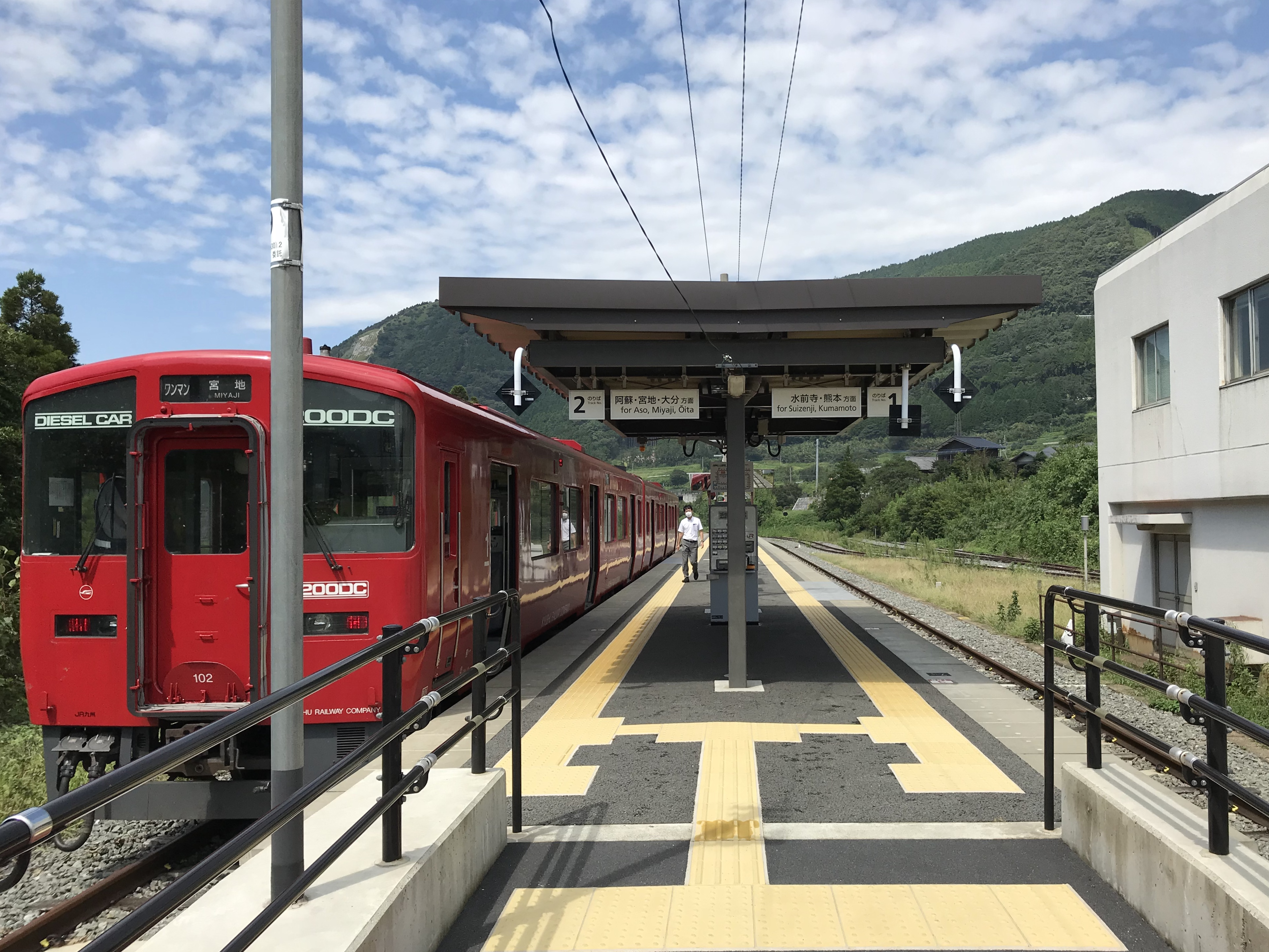
JR platform started to be used from August 2020

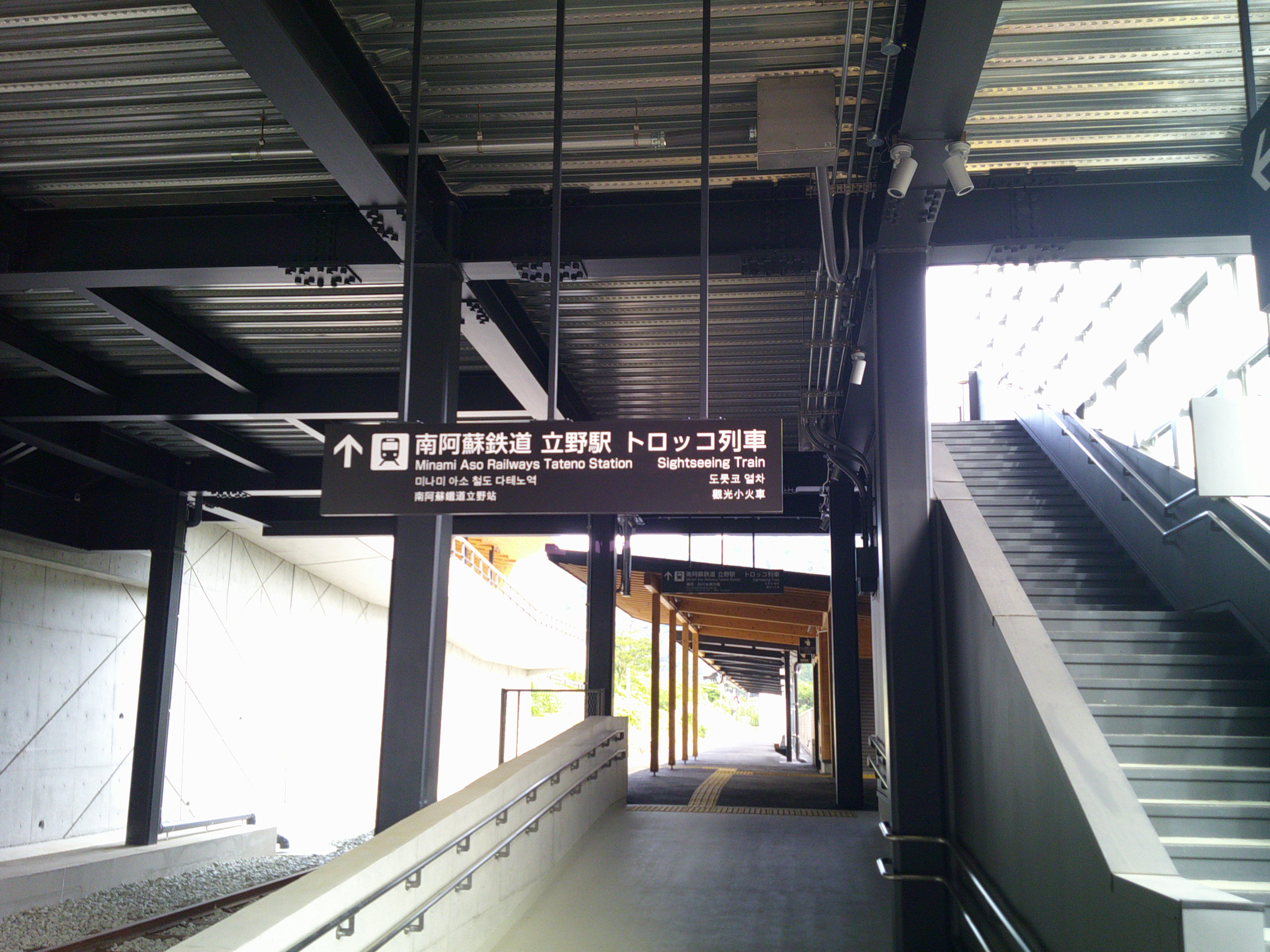
inami Aso Railway Tateno Station platform entrance that started operation from 15 July 2023.

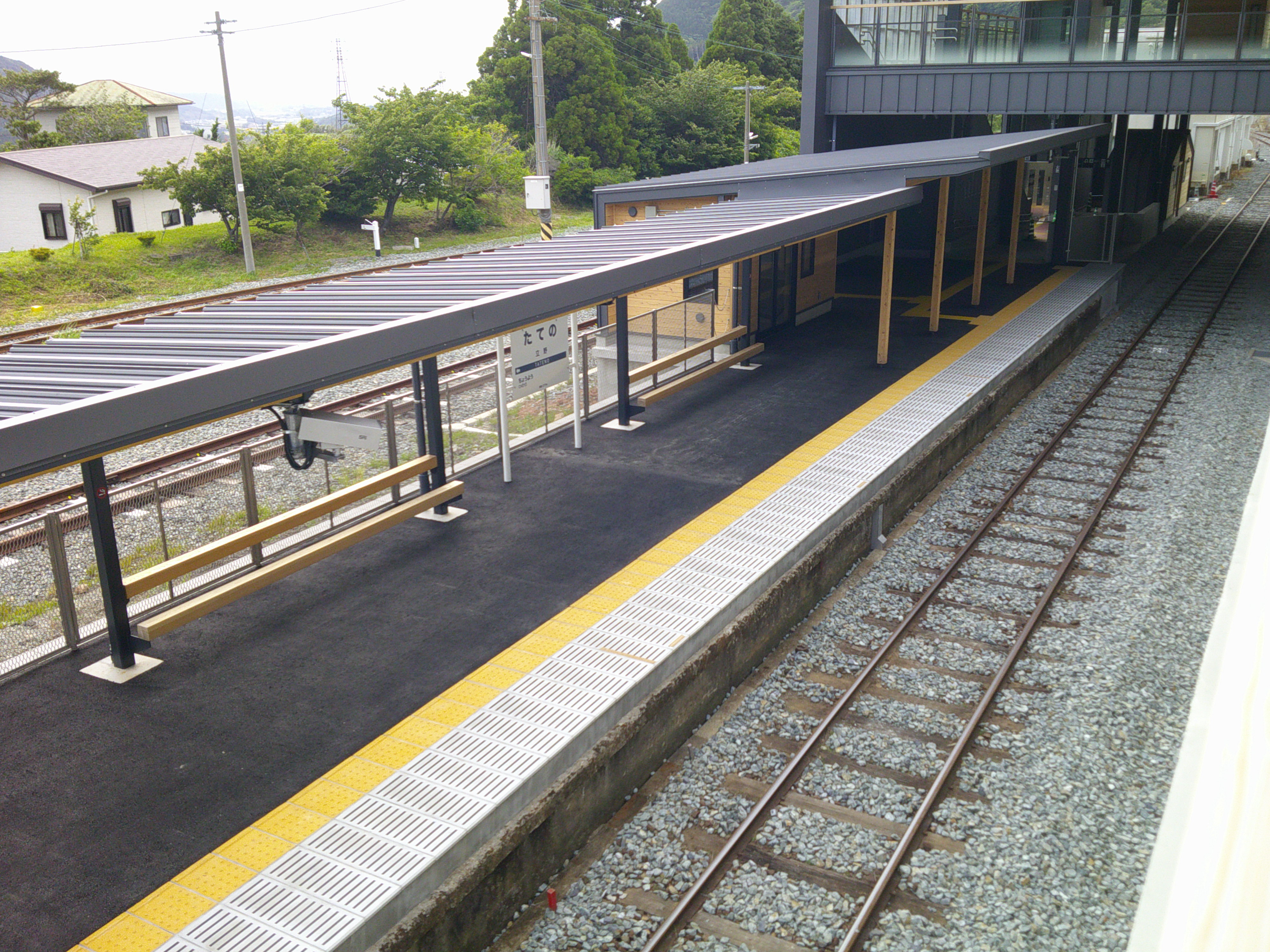
Minami Aso Railway Tateno Station platform, which started operation from 15 July 2023.

== Switchback ==
Tateno Station is located at an altitude of 277 metres (909 ft), while the next station, Akamizu, is 7.9 km (4.9 mi) away by rail and situated at an altitude of 465 metres (1,526 ft). To achieve a practical gradient while ascending 190 metres (620 ft) over this distance, trains must perform a three-stage switchback, changing direction twice, after leaving the station.

Trains approaching from Seta enter Tateno from the west, then reverse direction and exit the station westward. They continue to a point at an altitude of 306 metres (1,004 ft), where they reverse direction again onto a track heading toward the next station. A signboard on the Tateno Station platform provides passengers with a detailed guide to this procedure. The tracks involved in the switchback were severely damaged by the 2016 Kumamoto earthquakes.

== See also ==
- Tateno Station (Saga)
- List of railway stations in Japan
