= Takamori Station =

Railway station located in Takamori, Kumamoto

Takamori Station 高森駅
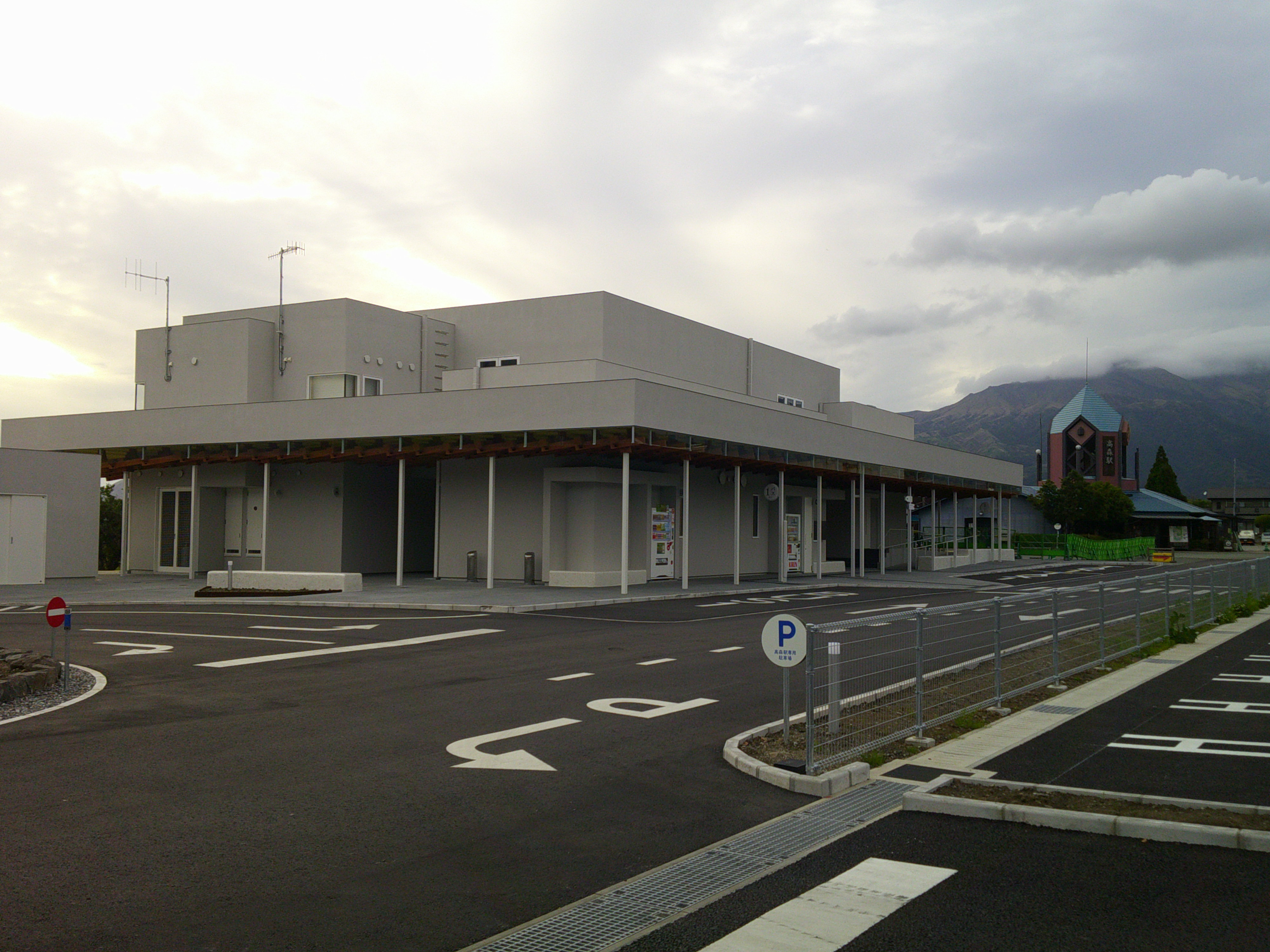
- Current station building and old station building (May 2023)

General information
- Location: Takamori, Kumamoto; Japan
- Coordinates: 32.8195°N 131.1227°E
- Operator: Minamiaso Railway
- Line: ■ Takamori Line
- Distance: 17.7 km (from Tateno Station)
- Platforms: 1 side platform

Construction
- Structure type: At-grade

History
- Opened: 12 February 1928

Services
Preceding station	Mimamiaso Railway	Following station
Miharashidai towards Tateno	Takamori Line	Terminus
Location

Takamori Station (高森駅, Takamori-eki) is a train station in Takamori, Kumamoto Prefecture, Japan. It is on the Takamori Line, operated by the Minamiaso Railway. Takamori Station is the only staffed station on the Takamori Line.

== History ==
- 12 February, 1928 - Station opened for business.
- 1 April 1986, - the station was converted from the Takamori Line of the Japanese National Railways to Minamiaso Railway.
- 6 April 1987, - Use of the second station building begins.
- 14–16 April 2016, - the Kumamoto earthquakes caused damage to bridges and tunnels on the Takamori line, and operations have since been suspended.
- 31 July 2016, - Takamori Station resumed operations along with the resumption of operations between Nakamatsu and Takamori.
- 28 April 2023, - Completion of the 3rd generation station building, use begins the next day (29 April).
- 15 July 2023, - Minami Aso Railway Takamori Line between Tateno and Nakamatsu has been restored and all lines have resumed operation. Some trains start direct operation to JR Higo-Ōzu .

== Gallery ==
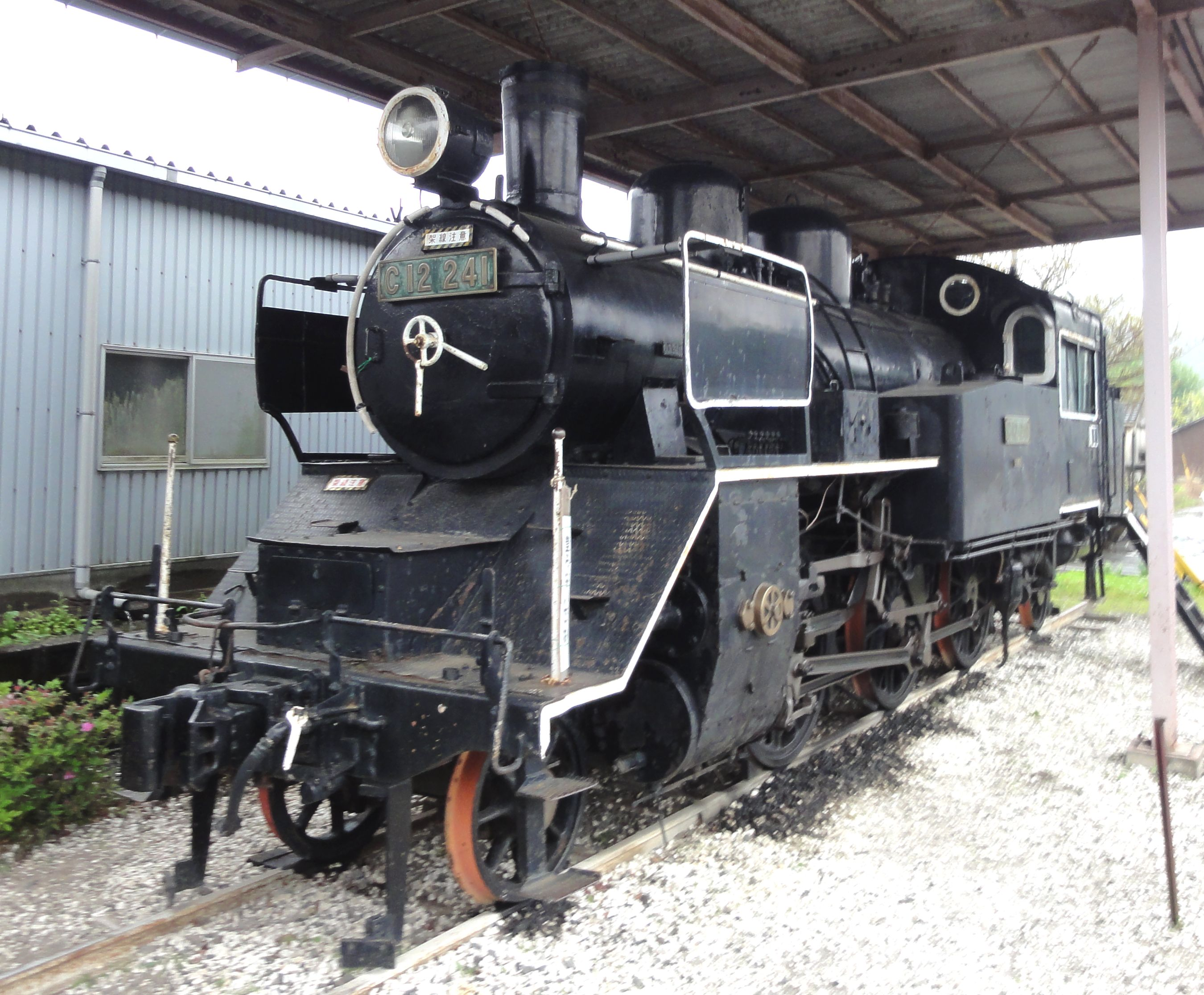
A JNR steam train put on display at Takamori Station.

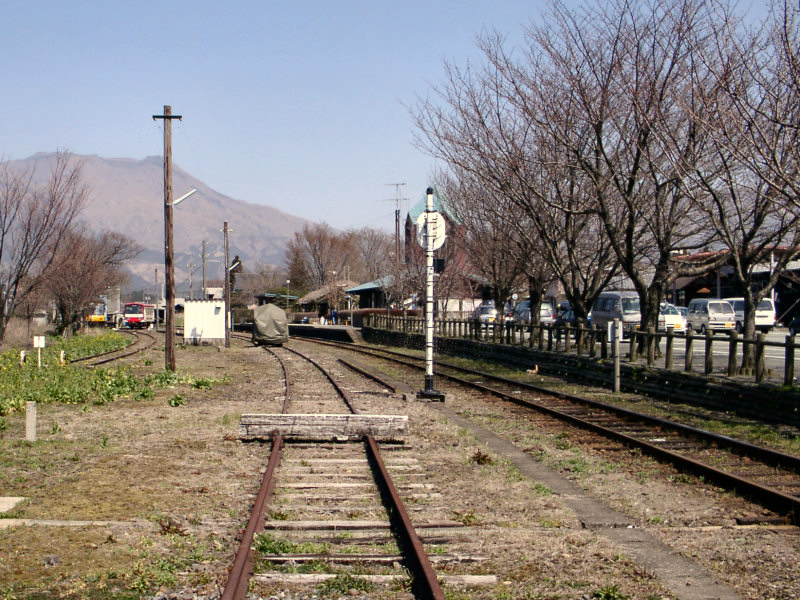
Station platforms

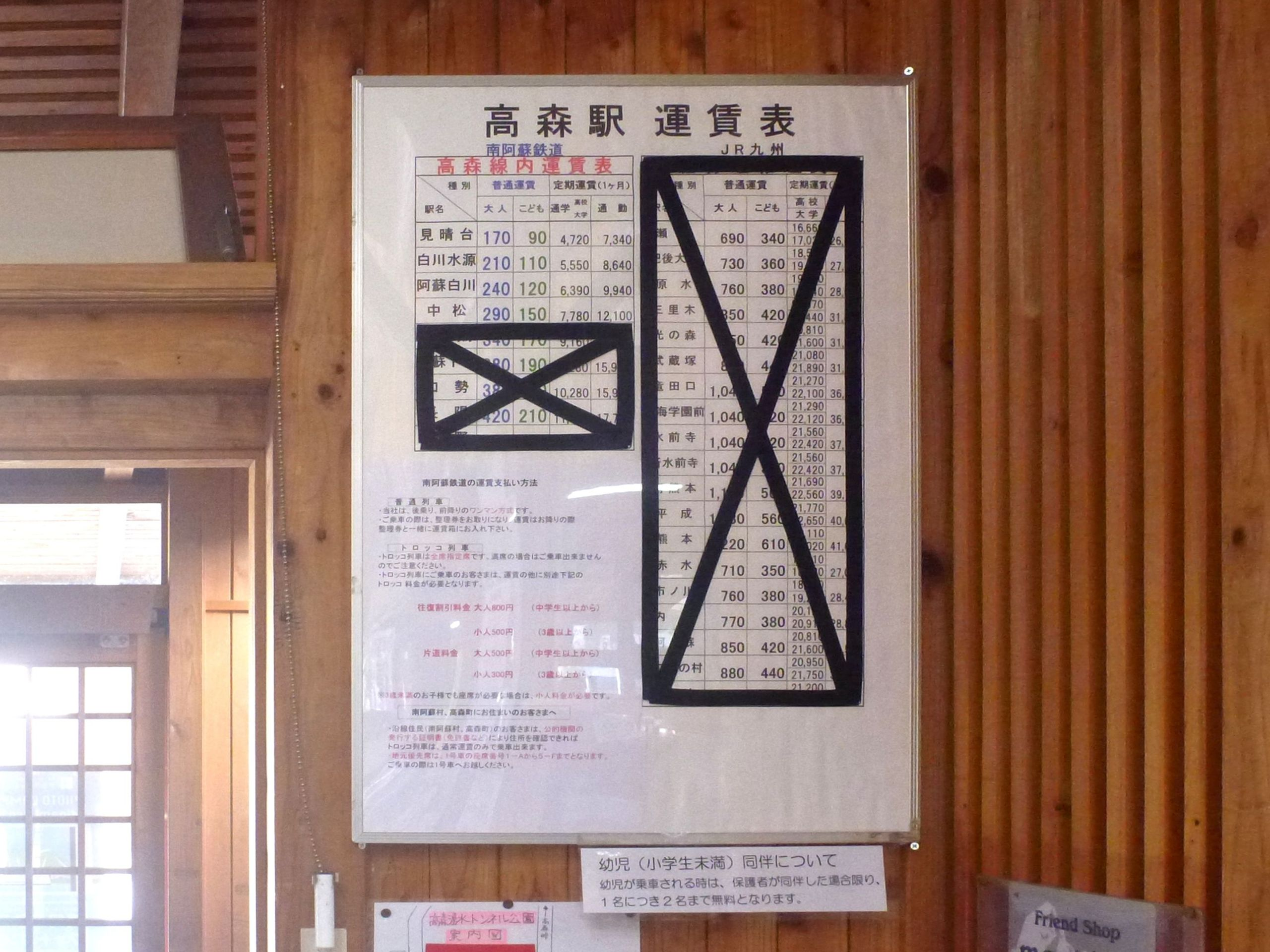
A ticket fare chart in the station. Note the crossed-out stations, which are inaccessible by rail due to earthquake damage.
