= Minamioguni, Kumamoto =

Minamioguni 南小国町
- Town
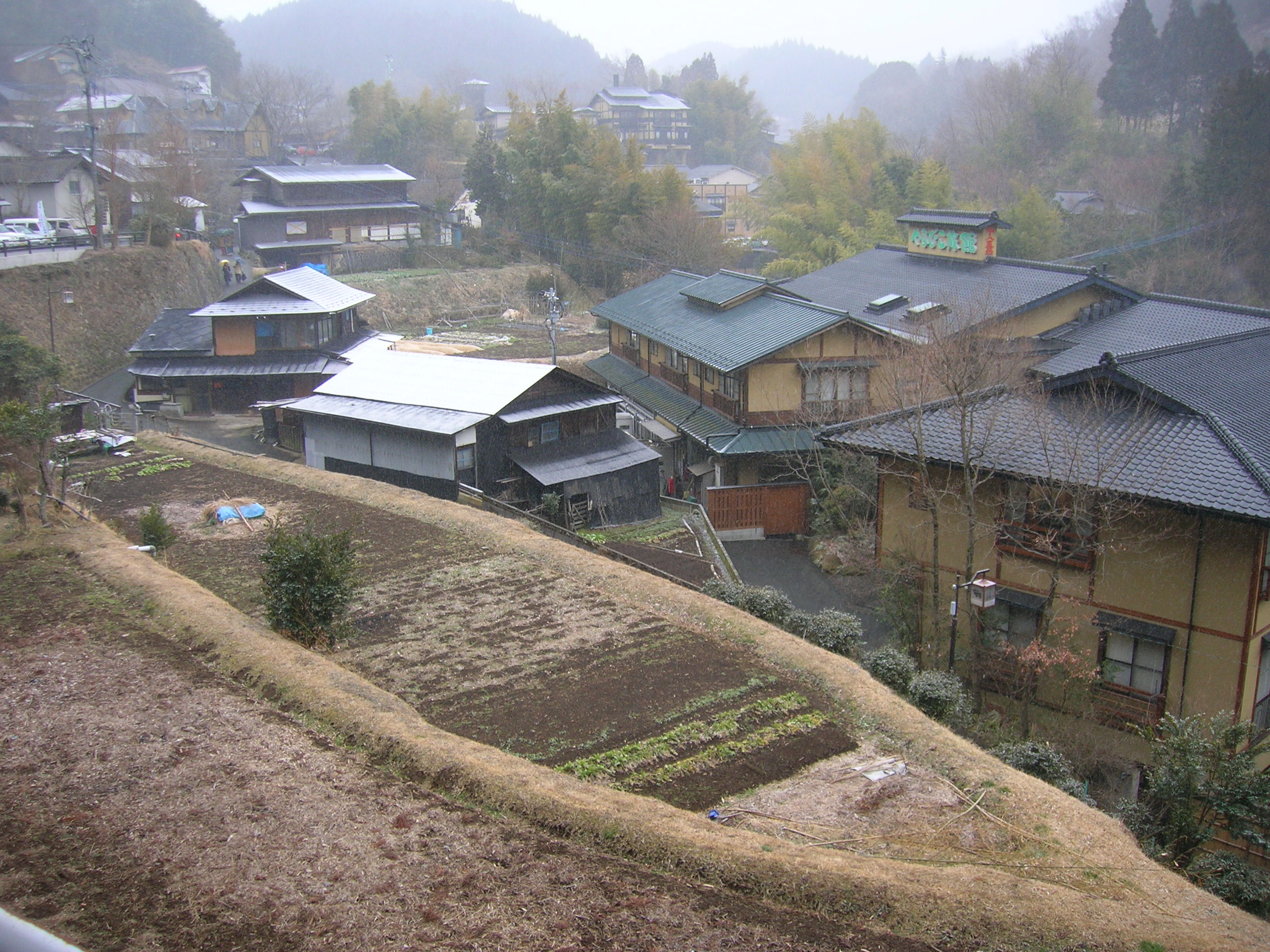
- Kurokawa onsen

- Flag Chapter
- Interactive map of Minamioguni
- Location in Japan
- Coordinates: 33°05′55″N 131°04′14″E
- Country: Japan
- Region: Kyushu
- Prefecture: Kumamoto
- District: Aso

Area
  - Total: 115.90 km^{2} (44.75 sq mi)

Population (June 30, 2024)
  - Total: 3,831
  - Density: 33.05/km^{2} (85.61/sq mi)
- Time zone: UTC+09:00 (JST)
- City hall address: 143 Akamaba, Minamioguni-machi, Aso-gun, Kumamoto-ken 869-2492
- Climate: Cfa
- Website: Official website
- Symbols
- Bird: Japanese bush warbler
- Flower: Japanese gentian
- Tree: Cryptomeria

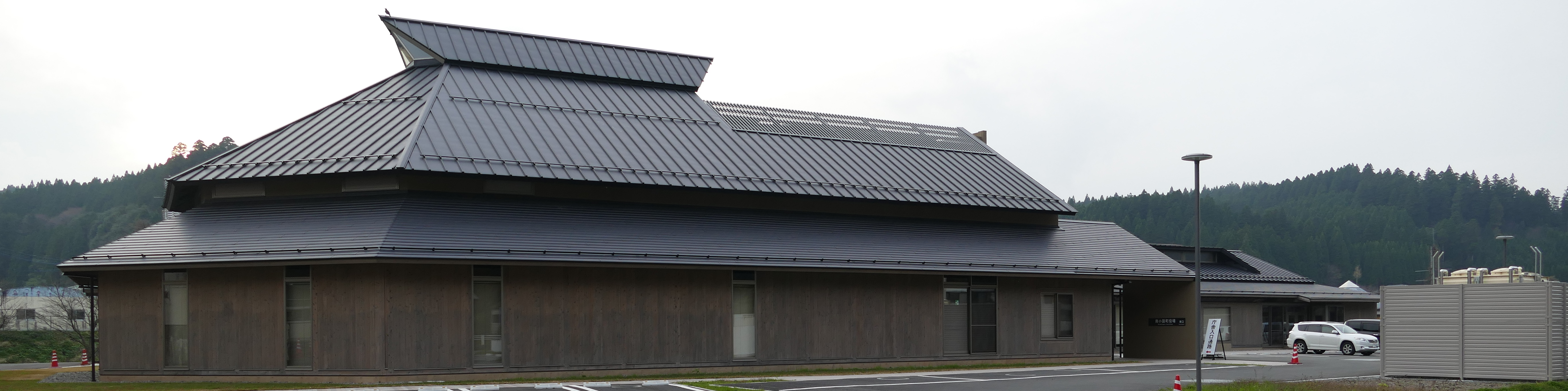
Minamiogun Town Hall

Minamioguni (南小国町, Minamioguni-machi) is a town located in Aso District, Kumamoto Prefecture, Japan. As of 1 June 2024, the town had an estimated population of 3,831 in 1870 households, and a population density of 33 persons per km^{2}. The total area of the town is 115.90 km^{2} (44.75 sq mi).

== Geography ==
Minamiogun is located in a plateau area at an altitude of 430 to 945 meters outside the northern outer rim of Mount Aso. To the east, it overlooks Mount Kuju in Oita Prefecture, the highest peak on the Kyushu mainland, and is also the source of the Chikugo River, Kyushu's largest river. Parts of the town are within the borders of the Aso-Kuju National Park.

=== Neighboring municipalities ===
Kumamoto Prefecture

- Aso
- Oguni
- Ubuyama

Ōita Prefecture

- Hita
- Kokonoe
- Taketa

=== Climate ===
Minamioguni has a humid subtropical climate (Köppen climate classification Cfa) with hot, humid summers and cool winters. There is significant precipitation throughout the year, especially during June and July. The average annual temperature in Minamioguni is 13.2 °C (55.8 °F). The average annual rainfall is 2,421.5 mm (95.33 in) with June as the wettest month. The temperatures are highest on average in August, at around 24.5 °C (76.1 °F), and lowest in January, at around 1.8 °C (35.2 °F). The highest temperature ever recorded in Minamioguni was 36.5 °C (97.7 °F) on 19 August 2020; the coldest temperature ever recorded was −13.8 °C (7.2 °F) on 10 February 1984.

Climate data for Minamioguni (1991−2020 normals, extremes 1977−present)
Month	Jan	Feb	Mar	Apr	May	Jun	Jul	Aug	Sep	Oct	Nov	Dec	Year
Record high °C (°F)	18.8 (65.8)	22.7 (72.9)	24.6 (76.3)	30.1 (86.2)	32.5 (90.5)	33.4 (92.1)	36.1 (97.0)	36.5 (97.7)	33.7 (92.7)	31.4 (88.5)	25.5 (77.9)	21.7 (71.1)	36.5 (97.7)
Mean daily maximum °C (°F)	7.6 (45.7)	9.6 (49.3)	13.5 (56.3)	19.2 (66.6)	23.9 (75.0)	25.8 (78.4)	29.4 (84.9)	30.5 (86.9)	26.9 (80.4)	21.8 (71.2)	16.0 (60.8)	10.0 (50.0)	19.5 (67.1)
Daily mean °C (°F)	1.8 (35.2)	3.2 (37.8)	6.8 (44.2)	12.0 (53.6)	16.9 (62.4)	20.5 (68.9)	24.2 (75.6)	24.5 (76.1)	20.9 (69.6)	14.8 (58.6)	9.0 (48.2)	3.6 (38.5)	13.2 (55.7)
Mean daily minimum °C (°F)	−2.8 (27.0)	−2.1 (28.2)	0.9 (33.6)	5.3 (41.5)	10.7 (51.3)	16.2 (61.2)	20.3 (68.5)	20.3 (68.5)	16.3 (61.3)	9.4 (48.9)	3.5 (38.3)	−1.3 (29.7)	8.1 (46.5)
Record low °C (°F)	−12.9 (8.8)	−13.8 (7.2)	−8.9 (16.0)	−5.1 (22.8)	−0.6 (30.9)	5.0 (41.0)	10.1 (50.2)	12.5 (54.5)	2.9 (37.2)	−2.4 (27.7)	−5.4 (22.3)	−9.7 (14.5)	−13.8 (7.2)
Average precipitation mm (inches)	73.8 (2.91)	107.6 (4.24)	161.8 (6.37)	165.8 (6.53)	197.5 (7.78)	518.2 (20.40)	490.5 (19.31)	235.0 (9.25)	206.0 (8.11)	102.0 (4.02)	92.8 (3.65)	70.7 (2.78)	2,421.5 (95.33)
Average precipitation days (≥ 1.0 mm)	8.4	9.5	12.1	11.1	10.7	15.5	15.6	12.6	10.9	8.3	8.5	8.3	131.5
Mean monthly sunshine hours	111.8	120.9	148.8	168.0	175.3	107.8	135.9	156.7	131.7	159.7	135.8	118.2	1,672.6
Source: Japan Meteorological Agency

=== Demographics ===
Per Japanese census data, the population of Minamioguni in 2020 is 3,750 people. Minamioguni has been conducting censuses since 1920.

Historical population

Year	Pop.	±%
1920	6,052	—
1925	6,359	+5.1%
1930	6,539	+2.8%
1935	6,389	−2.3%
1940	6,065	−5.1%
1945	7,177	+18.3%
1950	7,389	+3.0%
1955	7,761	+5.0%
1960	7,616	−1.9%
1965	6,913	−9.2%
1970	6,029	−12.8%

Year	Pop.	±%
1975	5,462	−9.4%
1980	5,319	−2.6%
1985	5,221	−1.8%
1990	4,973	−4.8%
1995	4,818	−3.1%
2000	4,657	−3.3%
2005	4,687	+0.6%
2010	4,429	−5.5%
2015	4,048	−8.6%
2020	3,750	−7.4%

Minamioguni population statistics

== History ==
The area of Oguni was part of ancient Higo Province, During the Edo Period it was part of the holdings of Kumamoto Domain. After the Meiji restoration, the village of Minamioguni was established.Minamioguni was raised to town status on November 1, 1969.

== Government ==
Minamioguni has a mayor-council form of government with a directly elected mayor and a unicameral town council of 12 members. Minamioguni, collectively with the other municipalities of Aso District contributes one member to the Kumamoto Prefectural Assembly. In terms of national politics, the city is part of the Kumamoto 3rd district of the lower house of the Diet of Japan.

== Economy ==
The main economic activities in Minamioguni are agriculture (rice, highland vegetables, livestock), forestry (Oguni cedar and cypress), and tourism (hot springs, outdoor activities).

== Education ==
Minamiguni has three public elementary schools and one public junior high school operated by the town government. The town does not have a high school.

== Transportation ==
=== Railways ===
The town does not have any passenger railway service. Aso Station on the JR Kyushu Hōhi Main Line is the nearest station.

=== Highways ===
- National Route 212
- National Route 442

== Local attractions ==
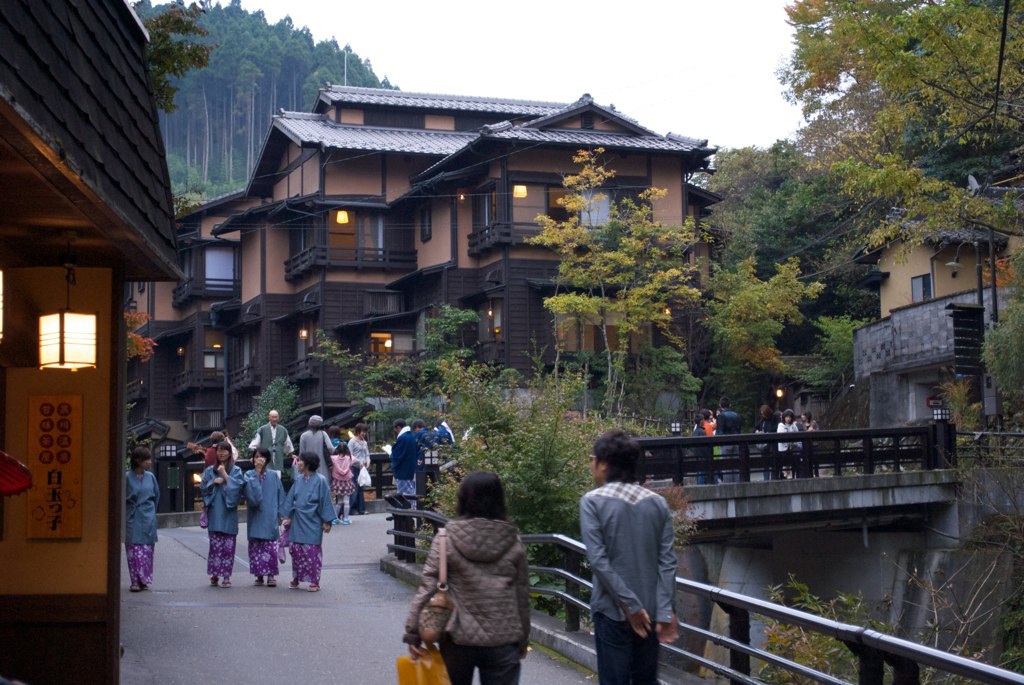
Kurokawa onsen

- Kurokawa onsen
