= Kikuchi Valley =

Coordinates: 33.0050°N 130.9409°E

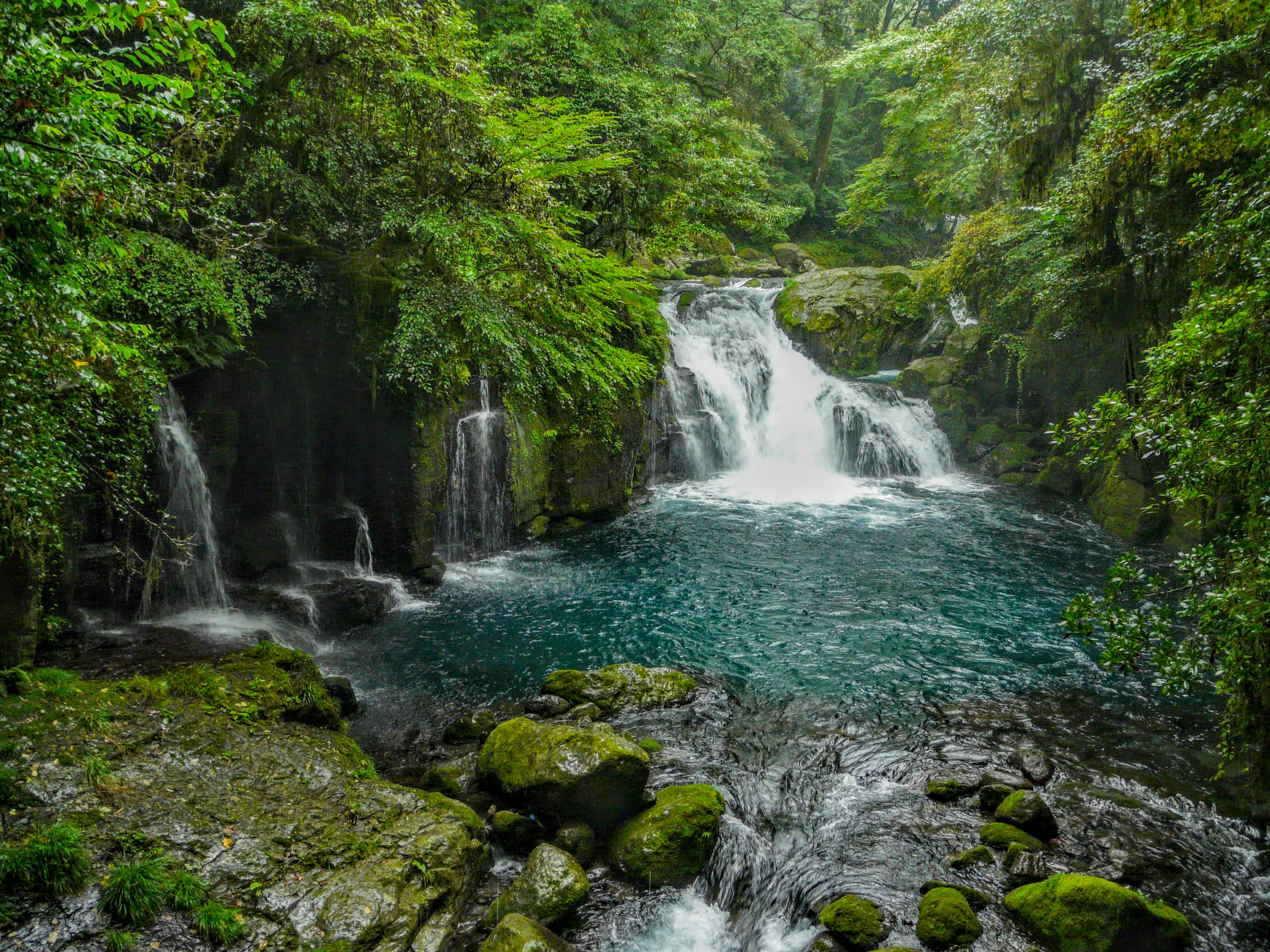
Tengu waterfall in Kikuchi river in Kikuchi Ravines.

Kikuchi Valley is the located in Aso and Kikuchi, Kumamoto cities in Kumamoto Prefecture, on the island of Kyushu, Japan. It is the source of the Kikuchi River. The valley is an area known for its resorts and autumn leaves.

The area around the outer rim of Mount Aso is concealed by fir, hemlock, elm, and broadleaf trees. Water from the Aso Kujū National Park has been chosen as one of Japan's top 100 sources of mineral water by the Ministry of the Environment. The area is home to several waterfalls, which have made Japan’s top 100 waterfalls list, and rapids.

A number of drowning accidents have occurred in the area.

== Recreation Forest ==
The woodlands around Kikuchi Valley have been designated as one of the top one hundred forest reserves in Japan.

| Mountain | Area (ha) | Altitude (m) | Man-Made Forest (%) | Natural Forest (%) | Tree Species | Rorest Protectionestricted Forests | Classification | Water flow (m3 / day) |
|---|---|---|---|---|---|---|---|---|
| Daikanbou | 1,200 | 400 ~ 900 | 66 | 33 | Japanese beech, maple, Japanese cedar, Japanese cypress, Japanese elm, oak, fir | Forest protected by law, recreational forest | Natural spring, Kikuchi river, subterranean river | 100,000 |

The woodland area, which covers the peaks and foothills of the mountains around the outer rim of Mount Aso, was developed and is being maintained by monitoring and working to prevent increasing pollution levels. The river is a source of water for the 21 municipalities below, who have created an association to regulate the water.
