= Ubuyama, Kumamoto =

Ubuyama 産山村
- Village
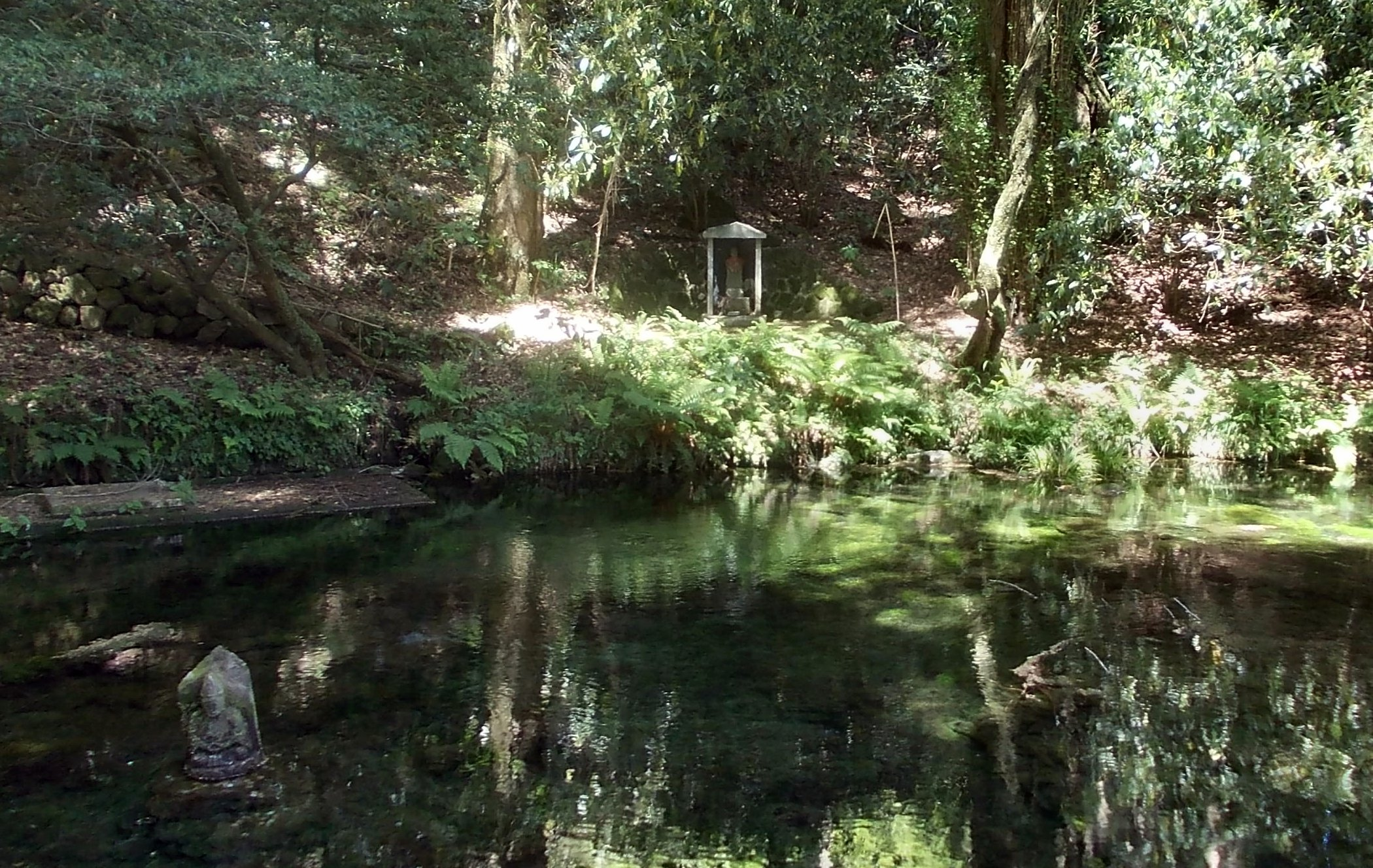
- Ikeyama fountainhead

- Flag Chapter
- Location of Ubuyama in Kumamoto Prefecture

- Location in Japan
- Coordinates: 32°59′42.8″N 131°13′6.2″E
- Country: Japan
- Region: Kyushu
- Prefecture: Kumamoto
- District: Aso

Area
  - Total: 60.81 km^{2} (23.48 sq mi)

Population (April 14, 2025)
  - Total: 1,341
  - Density: 22.05/km^{2} (57.12/sq mi)
- Time zone: UTC+09:00 (JST)
- City hall address: 488-3 Yamaga, Ubayama-mura, Aso-gun, Kumamoto-ken
- Website: Official website
- Symbols
- Flower: Echinops setifer
- Tree: Sawtooth oak

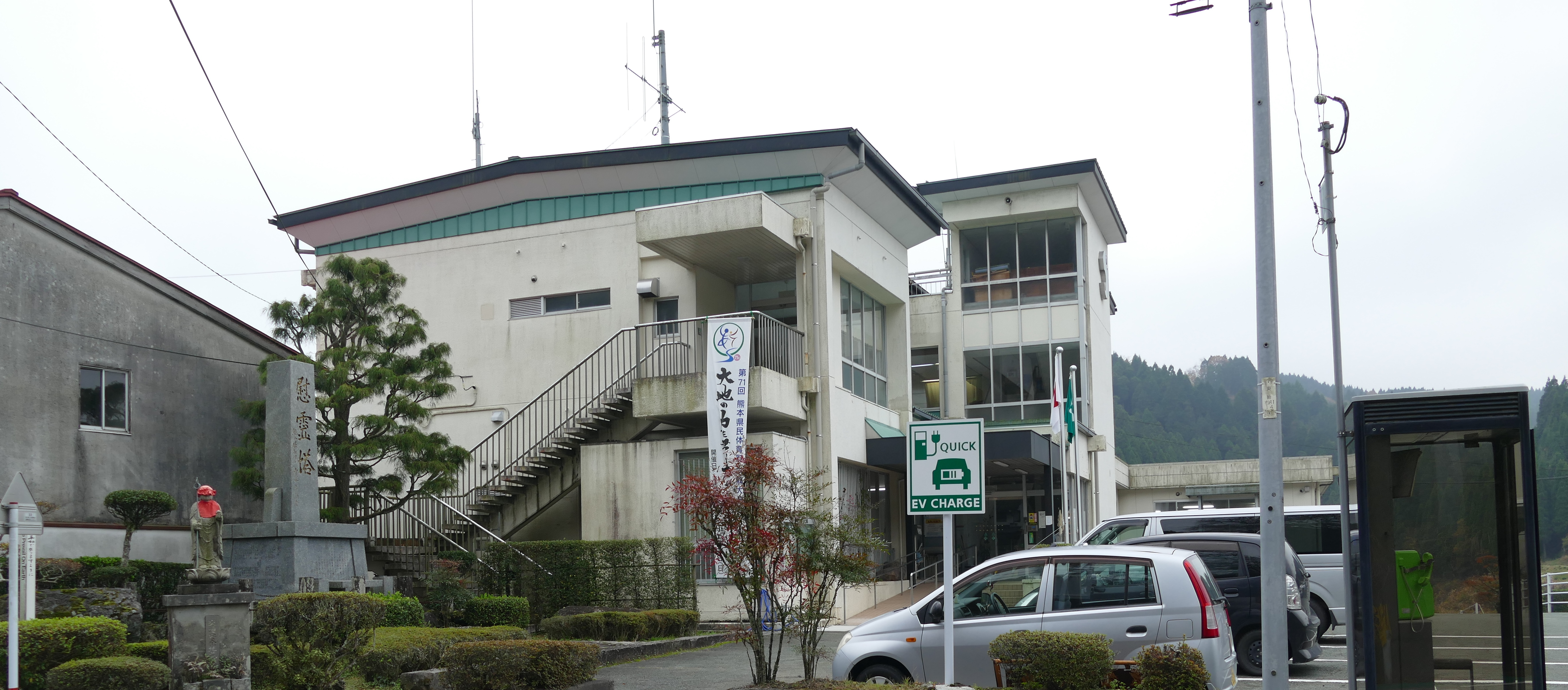
Ubuyama Village Hall

Ubuyama (産山村, Ubuyama-mura) is a village located in Aso District, Kumamoto Prefecture, Japan. As of 14 April 2025, the village had an estimated population of 1,341 in 660 households, and a population density of 23 persons per km^{2}. The total area of the village is 60.81 km^{2} (23.48 sq mi).

== Geography ==
Ubuyama is located in the Kyushu Mountains in central Kyushu, between the outer rim of Aso caldera and the Kuju mountain range in Oita Prefecture. Most of the village is within the borders of the Aso-Kuju National Park.The Oso River, a part of the Oono River system, flows through the village, and the Oso Dam is located there.

=== Neighboring municipalities ===
Kumamoto Prefecture

- Aso
- Minamioguni

Ōita Prefecture

- Taketa

=== Climate ===
Ubuyama has a humid subtropical climate (Köppen Cfa) characterized by warm summers and cool winters with light to no snowfall. The average annual temperature in Ubuyama is 12.0 °C. The average annual rainfall is 1863 mm with September as the wettest month. The temperatures are highest on average in August, at around 23.4 °C, and lowest in January, at around 1.2 °C.

=== Demographics ===
Per Japanese census data, the population of Ubuyama is as shown below

Historical population
Year	Pop.	±%
1940	2,478	—
1950	3,119	+25.9%
1960	3,168	+1.6%
1970	2,417	−23.7%
1980	1,981	−18.0%
1990	1,856	−6.3%
2000	1,824	−1.7%
2010	1,606	−12.0%
2020	1,382	−13.9%

== History ==
The area of Ubuyama was part of ancient Higo Province, During the Edo Period it was part of the holdings of Kumamoto Domain. After the Meiji restoration, the village of Ubuyama was established on April 1, 1889 with the creation of the modern municipalities system.

== Government ==
Ubuyama has a mayor-council form of government with a directly elected mayor and a unicameral village council of eight members. Ubuyama, collectively with the other municipalities of Aso District, contributes one member to the Kumamoto Prefectural Assembly. In terms of national politics, the village is part of the Kumamoto 3rd district of the lower house of the Diet of Japan.

== Economy ==
Ubuyama's economy is mainly based on agriculture and tourism.

== Education ==
Ubuyama has one public combined elementary/junior high school operated by the village government. The village does not have a high school.

== Transportation ==
=== Railways ===
The village does not have any passenger railway service since the closure of the Miyahara Line in 1984. Miyaji Station on the JR Kyushu Hōhi Main Line is the nearest station.

=== Highways ===
- National Route 57
- National Route 442
