= Aso Caldera =

Caldera in Kumamoto Prefecture, Japan

- Aso Volcano, Asosan
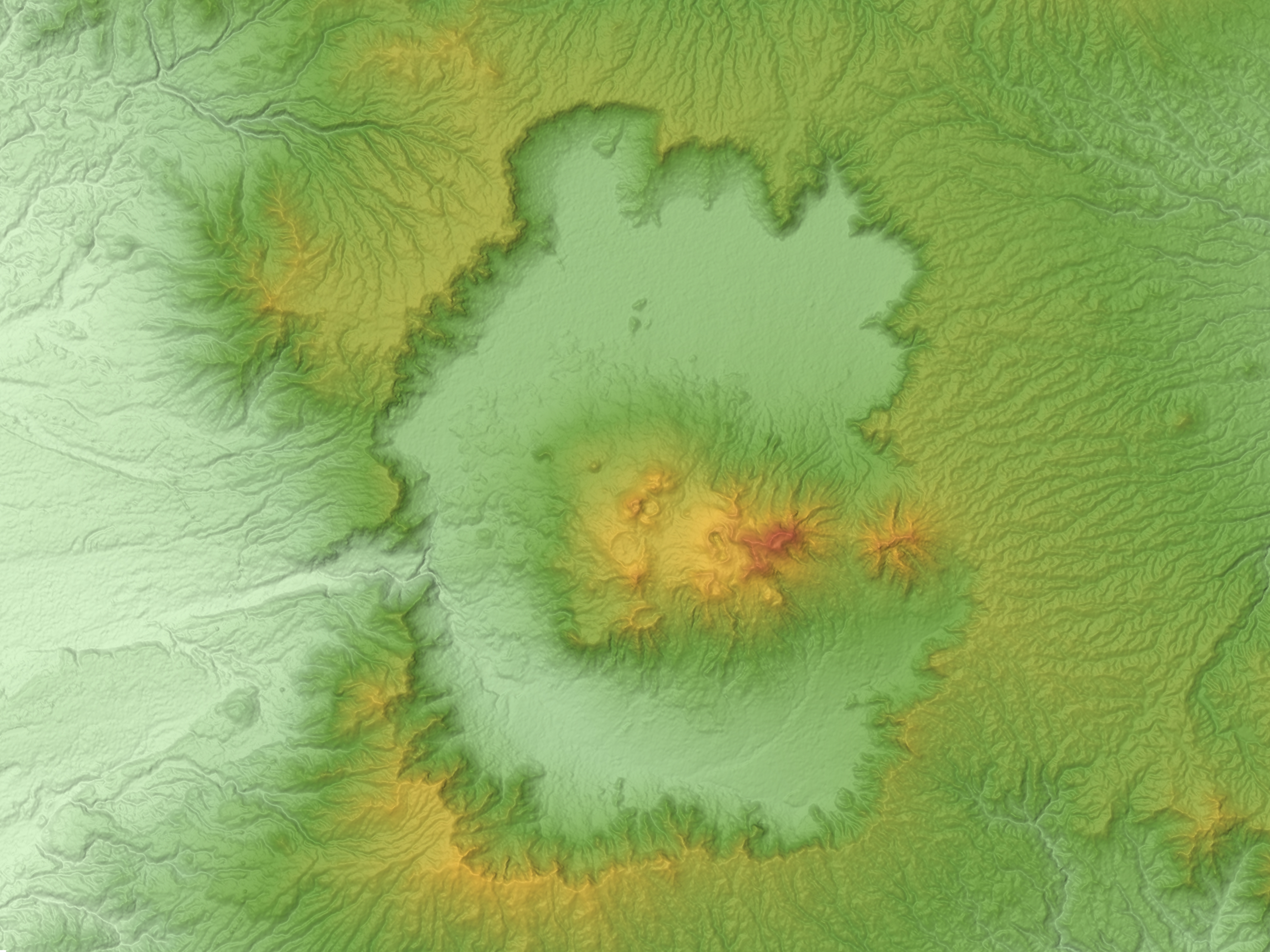
- Aso Caldera

Highest point
- Peak: Takadake, 32°53′03″N 131°06′14″E
- Elevation: 1,592 m (5,223 ft)
- Coordinates: 32°53′02″N 131°06′14″E

Dimensions
- Length: 25 km (16 mi) NS
- Width: 18 km (11 mi) EW

Naming
- Native name: 阿蘇カルデラ (Japanese)

Geography
- Location within Japan
- Location: Kumamoto, Japan
- Country: Japan
- State: Kumamoto Prefecture
- Region: Aso District, Aso City, Takamori

Geology
- Rock age: Pleistocene onwards
- Mountain type(s): Caldera; Somma volcano
- Rock type(s): Dacite, Andesite
- Last eruption: 2021 CE

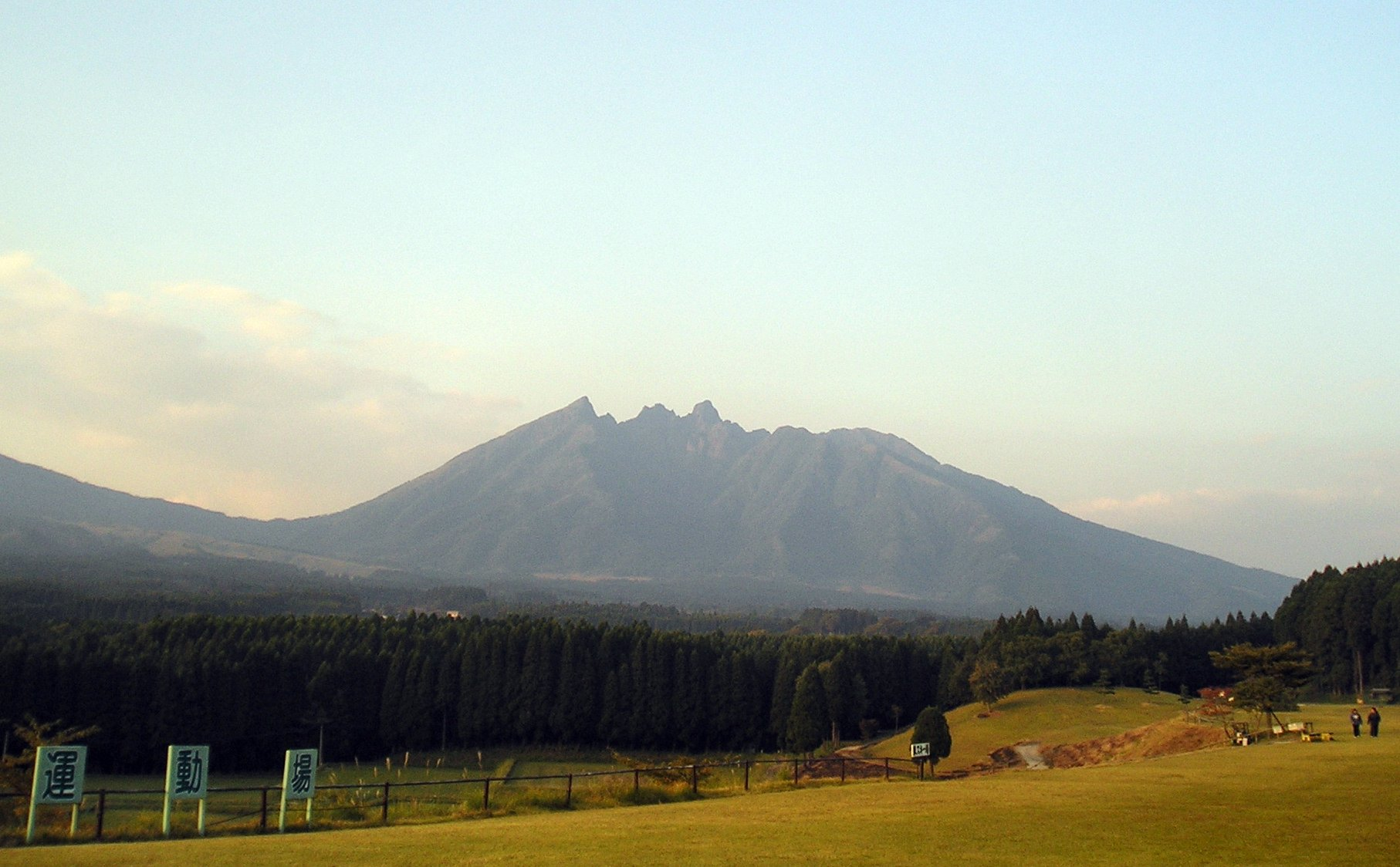
Nekodake, the most western Central cone within the Aso Caldera

Aso Caldera (also known as Asosan, the Aso Volcano or Mount Aso, although the later term usually is used related to its currently active vents) is a geographical feature of Kumamoto Prefecture, Japan. It stretches 25 kilometers north to south and 18 kilometers east to west. The central core "Aso Gogaku" is the five major mountains in the area. Aso valley (Asodani) runs along the northern base of Mount Aso and Nango valley (Nangodani) along the south. According to research of caldera sediment, lakes used to exist in these valleys. The dried-up lake areas have come to be called Old Aso Lake, Kugino Lake, and Aso Valley Lake. The Kikuchi, Shirakawa and Kurokawa rivers now drain the caldera.

== Geology ==
Within the caldera are more than 17 cones. The central "Aso Gogaku" group of volcanoes are Takadake (Mount Taka) at 1,592 m (5,223 ft), Nekodake at 1,433 m (4,701 ft), Nakadake (Mount Naka) at 1,506 m (4,941 ft), Kijimadake at 1,321 m (4,334 ft) and Eboshidake at 1,337 m (4,386 ft). These are higher than the caldera rim itself that towards the south west is 1,236 m (4,055 ft) high. Other volcanic features include Kishimadake (Mount Kishima), Kusasenrigahama, Komezuka, a scoria cone, Ikenokubo maar, a tuff ring and Takanooban, a lava dome. The currently active Nakadake has seven craters roughly aligned in a north–south direction with most recent eruptions being from the northernmost first crater of Nakadake which has hydrothermal reservoirs beneath it at about 1 km (0.62 mi) to 2.5 km (1.6 mi) depth. Presently there is a roughly spherical magma chamber at a depth of 6 km (3.7 mi), and flattened at 10 km (6.2 mi) located between Kishimadake, Eboshidake, and Nakadake with the magmatic source beneath the center of Aso caldera. Magma migrates diagonally upward from approximately 17 km (11 mi) depth through a northward-dipping magma-filled crack propagation zone, then into the shallow magma reservoirs mentioned already and during eruptions into an upright crack intrusion zone at 2–4 km (1.2–2.5 mi) depth. There are many geothermal areas including centrally the Jigoku or "hell" Onsen and Tarutama hot springs and in the northern part, the Uchinomaki hot springs.

=== Formation ===
The caldera formed from four major pyroclastic flow events which occurred between 90,000 and 270,000 years ago. The largest of these was the fourth, which reached as far as nearby Yamaguchi Prefecture 160 kilometers away. The fourth eruption left a massive pyroclastic plateau which is what remains even today. In 1985 it was discovered that volcanic ash from the fourth eruption covered much of the Japanese islands. The eruptive volume of the fourth eruption is estimated to be 384 km^{3} (92 cu mi) dense-rock equivalent (DRE). Ashfall deposit greater than 15 cm (5.9 in) deep was identified on Hokkaido Island about 1,500 km (930 mi) to the north. 90,000 years ago, the VEI-8 eruption of the Aso Caldera spewed circa 1 trillion cubic meters of ash.

=== Eruptions ===
Aso volcano has been active at intervals of approximately 10–20 years with the most active cone in recorded history being Nakadake located in the center of the caldera. It has been active since the sixth century. Eruptions occurred from November 2014 to May 2015, with two major phreatomagmatic eruptions on September 14, 2015, and October 8, 2016. Eruptive activity occurred on 20 October 2021.

Immediate impact of the Aso Caldera forming eruption. The pink pyroclastic flow although sterilising was modified by landforms more than this figure suggests, but 15 cm tephra contour did have significant impact on all higher life forms.

Main eruption ages and eruption volume (DRE (dense-rock equivalent) is the equivalent magma eruption volume. The volume of erupted products is much higher):

- Aso-1: About 266,000 years ago, erupted 32 km^{3} (7.7 cu mi) DRE.
- Aso-2: About 141,000 years ago, erupted 32 km^{3} (7.7 cu mi) DRE.
- Aso-3: About 130,000 years ago, erupted 96 km^{3} (23 cu mi) DRE.
- Aso-4: About 90,000 years ago, erupted 384 km^{3} (92 cu mi) DRE which was at least VEI 7.
- Nojiri pumice about 84,000 years ago erupted 1 km^{3} (0.24 cu mi) DRE.
- Kusasenrigahama Pumice from Kusasenrigahama at approximately 30,000 years ago erupted 1 km^{3} (0.24 cu mi) DRE at VEI 5
- Jigoku spa about 8,050 BCE, Ikph2 tephra
- Janoo before 5,300 BCE Tephta and scora cone
- Nakadake 5,300 to 12,000 BCE tephra falls
- near Janoo about 5,300 BCE Akamizu lava flow
- Near Ikenokubo about 5,300 BCE tuff ring
- Jigoku Onsen 3,000 to 4,400 BCE tephra, Ikph1 tephra
- Nakadake 3,000 to 4,400 BCE tephra falls
- Nakadake 4,000 to 3,000 BCE tephra falls
- Unknown vent near Janoo, 2150 BCE Aso central cone No. 1 pumice, ACP-1 tephra
- Kishimadake 2,050 BCE >0.02 km^{3} (0.0048 cu mi) DME VEI 4, KsS tephra
- Nakadake 1,600 to 2,000 BCE tephra falls
- Ojodake 1,650 BCE >0.02 km^{3} (0.0048 cu mi) DME VEI 4, OjS tephra
- Komezuka, Kamikomezuka 1,350 BCE tephra 0.05 km^{3} (0.012 cu mi) DME
- Unknown Aso 1270 ± 75 BCE
- Western central cones debris avalanche 100 CE to 400 BCE
- Nakadake 630 ± 50 BCE tephra falls
- Nakadake 440 ± 75 CE N2S tephra fall
- See timeline for eruptions in historic written record (KEY-pink if confined to volcano, red tephra fall, magenta human deaths)

=== Tectonics ===
There are multiple active faults both under the volcano and adjacent on this area of the Amur Plate. The Okinawa Plate collides with the Amur Plate to the south and the Pacific Plate is subducting under both. The caldera is located where two volcanic lines intersect, being those in the Central Kyushu Rift Valley with volcanoes of Mount Yufu, in Oita Prefecture, through the Kuju volcanoes and Aso Caldera, and on to Mount Unzen and line that runs from Aso Caldera to the Kirishima volcanic group, Aira Caldera, Ata Caldera, and on to the Kikai Caldera. The high resolution Bouguer gravity imaging of Kyushu has confirmed the caldera to be piston rather than funnel shaped, as originally proposed, and related to known active faults and in particular the gravity gradient zone of the Aso Caldera is part of the Oita-Kumamoto Tectonic Line (OKTL) gravity gradient zone and this appears to connect with the Japan Median Tectonic Lines gravity gradient zone, strengthening the evidence that the lines are closely related tectonic features.

== Size and other context ==
In Japan, the caldera forming Lake Kussharo, which measures 26 by 20 km (16 by 12 mi), is larger than Aso caldera leaving it the second largest in Japan. It is not rare to see calderas of this scale; however, to see calderas with an interior stable enough to cultivate land, build highways and lay railroads is quite rare. The caldera contains the city of Aso as well as the town and village of Takamori and Minamiaso.
