= Kikuchi River =

River in Japan

Coordinates: 32°52′47″N 130°31′34″E

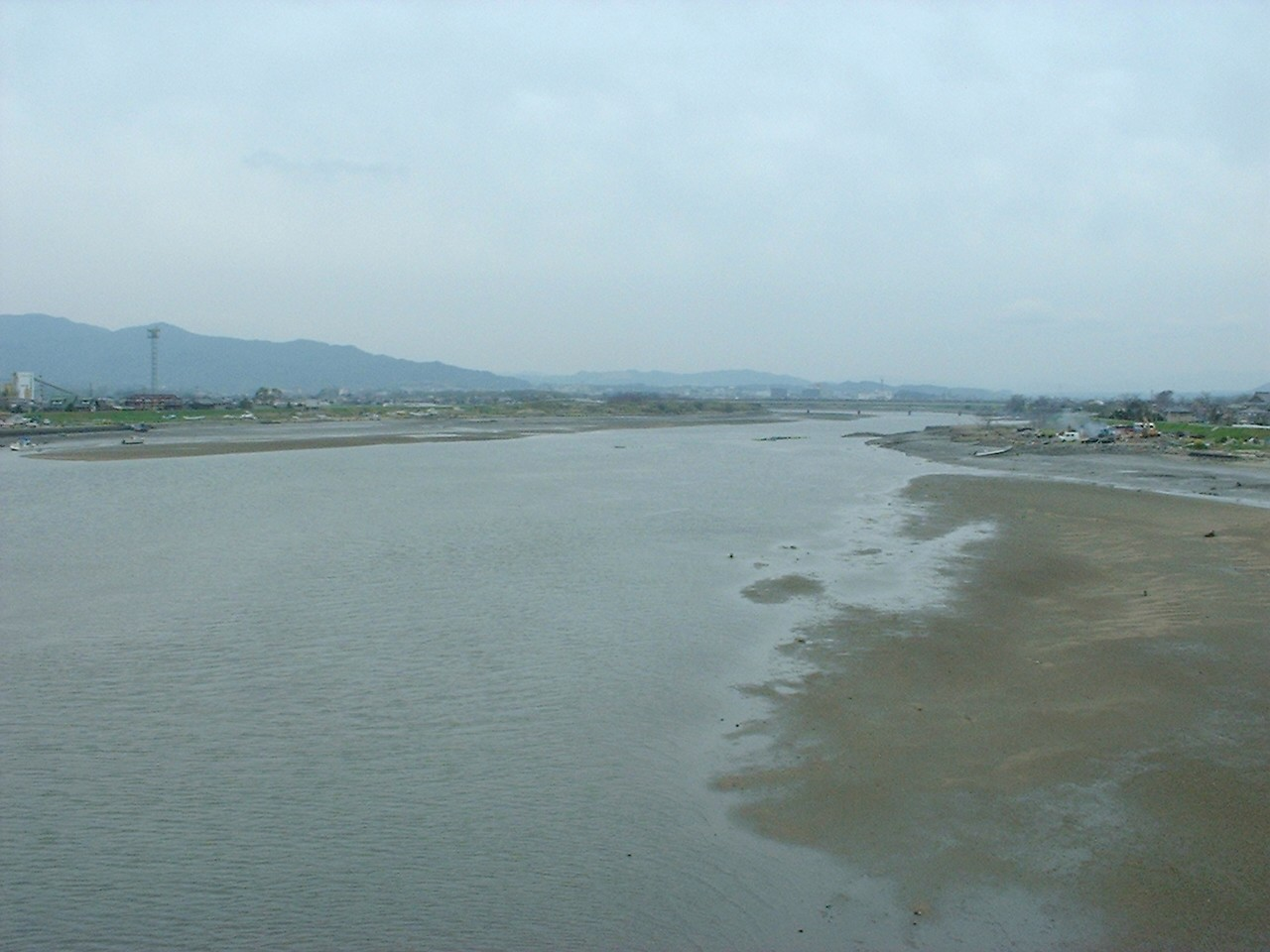
- The river at Tamana, Kumamoto.

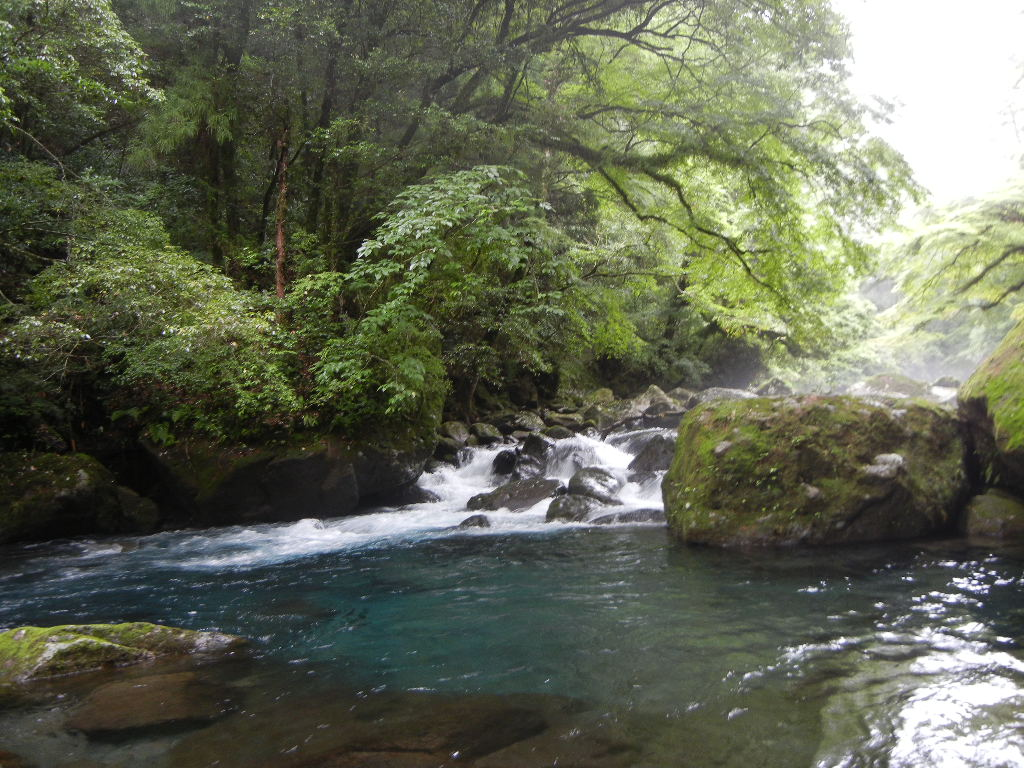
Rapids at Kikuchi River valley

The Kikuchi River (菊池川, Kikuchi-gawa) flows through the northern part of Kumamoto Prefecture, Kyūshū, Japan. The source of the Class A river is Fukaba, Aso city near Mt. Aso at the height of 1,041 metres (3,415 ft) and flows west through the Kikuchi Valley. It turns south near Kikusui and empties into the Shimabara Bay in the Ariake sea. Land reclamation is taking place at its mouth.

The river has a total length of 71 km (44 mi). It begins at an elevation of 1,041 metres (3,415 ft) and has a catchment area of 995 km^{2} (384 sq mi). The width of the river ranges from 24 to 72 metres (79 to 236 ft) and the current velocity and discharge varies greatly through the year, from 10 to 350 cubic metres per second (350 to 12,360 cu ft/s).
