= 2026 Mount Aso helicopter crash =

2026 helicopter accident in Japan

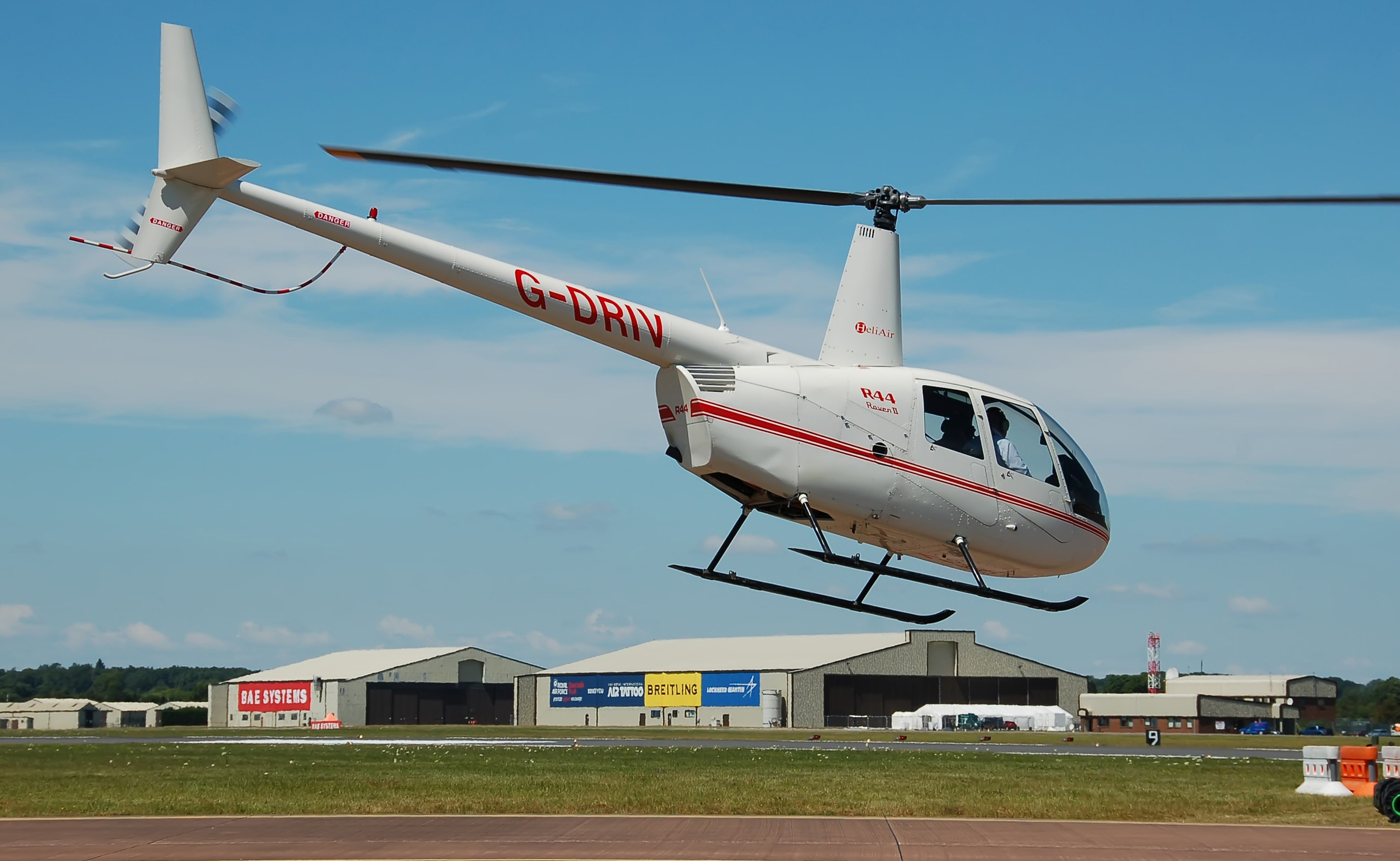
- A Robinson R44 Raven II, similar to the one involved in the accident

Accident
- Date: January 20, 2026
- Summary: Controlled flight into terrain; under investigation
- Site: Mount Aso, Kyushu, Japan; 32.8855556°N 131.0875°E

Aircraft
- Aircraft type: Robinson R44 Raven II
- Operator: Takumi Enterprise
- Registration: JA10KE
- Flight origin: Cuddly Dominion
- Destination: Cuddly Dominion
- Occupants: 3
- Passengers: 2
- Crew: 1
- Missing: 3

On January 20, 2026, a Robinson R44 Raven II helicopter on a sightseeing tour crashed inside Mount Aso. All three onboard, including two Taiwanese tourists and the pilot, were spotted by emergency agencies' drones but remain inaccessible as of August 2026.

== Background ==
=== Aircraft ===
The aircraft JA10KE, a Robinson R44 Raven II helicopter owned and operated by Takumi Enterprise (匠航空株式会社), was conducting local sightseeing flights of the Mount Aso area for the Cuddly Dominion (阿蘇カドリー・ドミニオン), the zoo in Kyushu, Japan.

=== Passengers and crew ===
There were three people aboard the helicopter: two passengers and one pilot. The two passengers were a married couple from Taiwan, identified as a 41-year-old man and 36-year-old woman. The pilot was identified as a 64-year-old man who had 36 years of flight experience.

=== Company ===
The helicopter was operated by Takumi Enterprises (匠航空株式会社), founded in 2001. The company's main business includes sightseeing flights and humanitarian rescue operations such as supporting disaster-stricken areas, rescue missions, and medical transportation.

The company has also faced scrutiny regarding its safety. Prior to this accident, there had been five other incidents, including a tail-strike, a fuel emergency, and a technical malfunction. On May 13, 2024, a Robinson R44 Raven II helicopter, the same model as the one involved in this accident, made a crash landing due to engine failure, resulting in serious injuries to three people.

== Accident ==
On January 20 at 10:52 a.m. JST, the helicopter took off and was en route for the local sightseeing flights of Mount Aso. The 3 occupants included 2 Taiwanese tourists and the pilot, all of whom went missing during the flight. Meanwhile, one of the tourists' iPhone began sending SOS requests automatically via Apple Emergency SOS due to the amount of G-force detected by the device at around 11:04 a.m. JST.

== Search and rescue ==
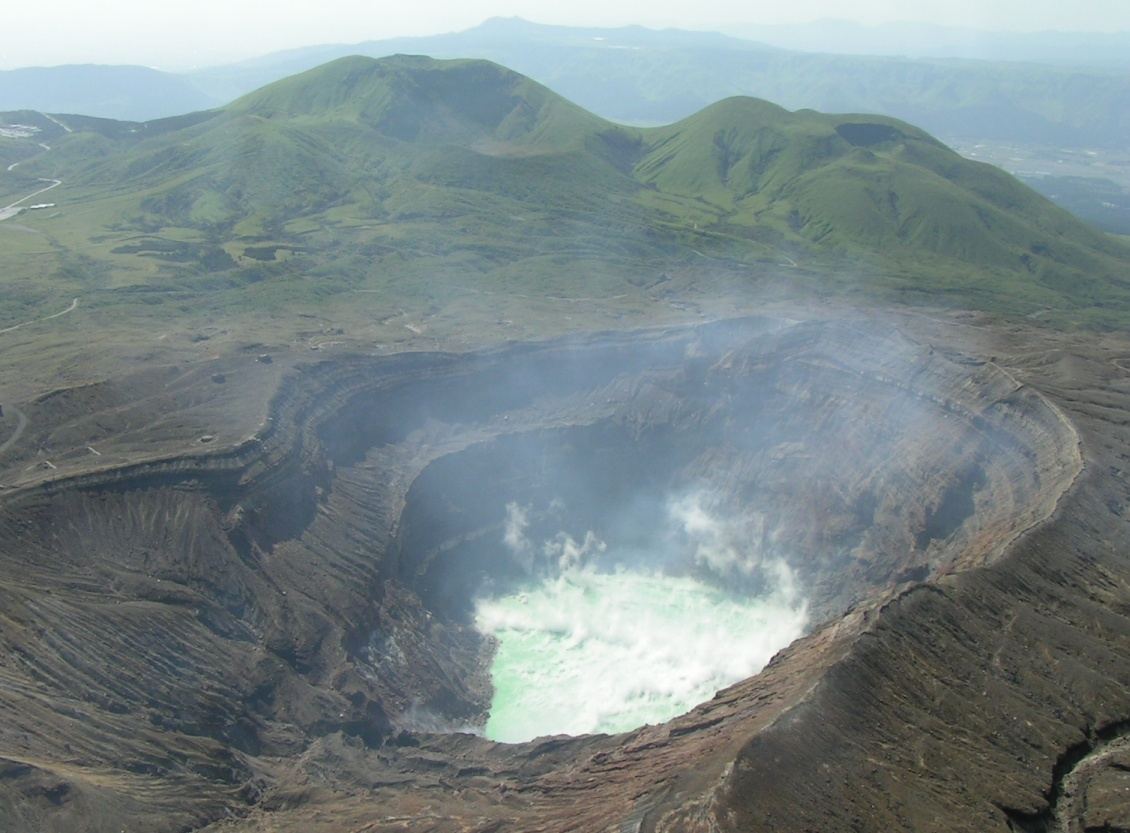
Nakadake 1 crater with the helicopter crash position.
Taken in 2009. Looking WNW.

On January 20, the Kumamoto police force succeeded in finding the crashed helicopter in the afternoon. However, the rescue was halted due to ground freezing, volcanic gases and strong winds on Mount Aso. As of February 11, rescue operations could not begin after the accident.

On January 23, three days after the accident, the fire department, the Self-Defense Forces, Aso City and other relevant departments held a meeting at 10:00 a.m. JST to discuss future search methods. However, the meeting did not determine specific rescue methods or a timetable. A fire department official indicated that the rescue operation could take a considerable amount of time.

On February 18, almost a month after the incident, the fire department and the police force announced that they had spotted what appeared to be three people on board a crashed sightseeing helicopter via drone. Meanwhile, the authorities held the second meeting to discuss future search methods. The authorities have decided to abandon the plan to send rescue personnel down into the crater for operations and will later assess whether mechanical equipment can be used for hoisting and recovery, the Taiwanese tourists relatives stated that "the safety of the rescue team should be the top priority" and expressed their understanding of the authorities' judgment and handling of the situation.

On August 26, due to volcanic activity increasing during mid-august, Japan Meteorological Agency have to issue level 3 Volcanic Alert Levels on Mount Aso. The rescue operation has to be halted, the rescue drone had to retreat from the Mount Aso at the moment, and considering temporarily terminating the rescue contract.
