= Aso Kujū National Park =

National Park in Kyūshū, Japan

Aso-Kujū National Park
- 阿蘇くじゅう国立公園
- IUCN category II (national park)
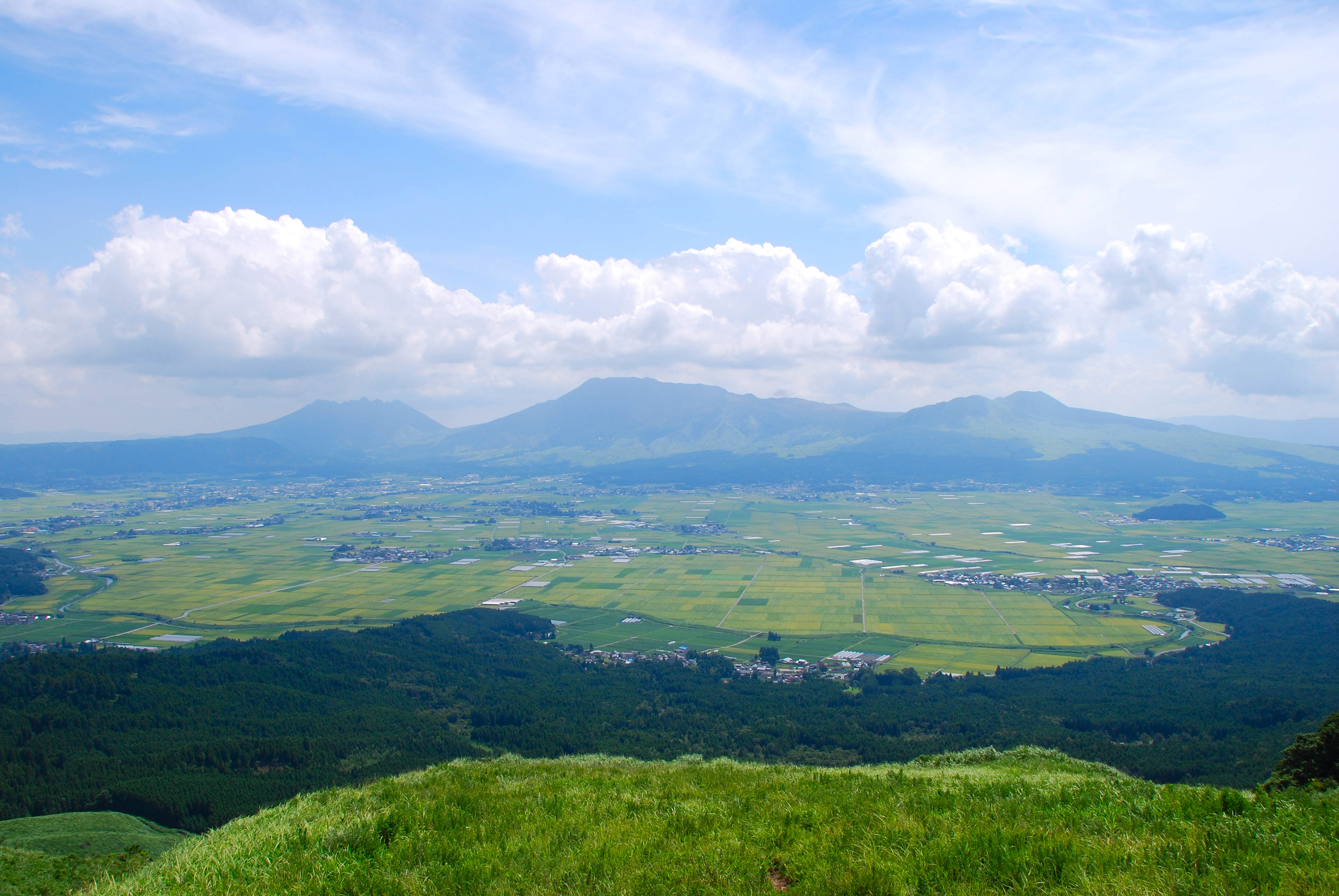
- Mount Aso and its caldera

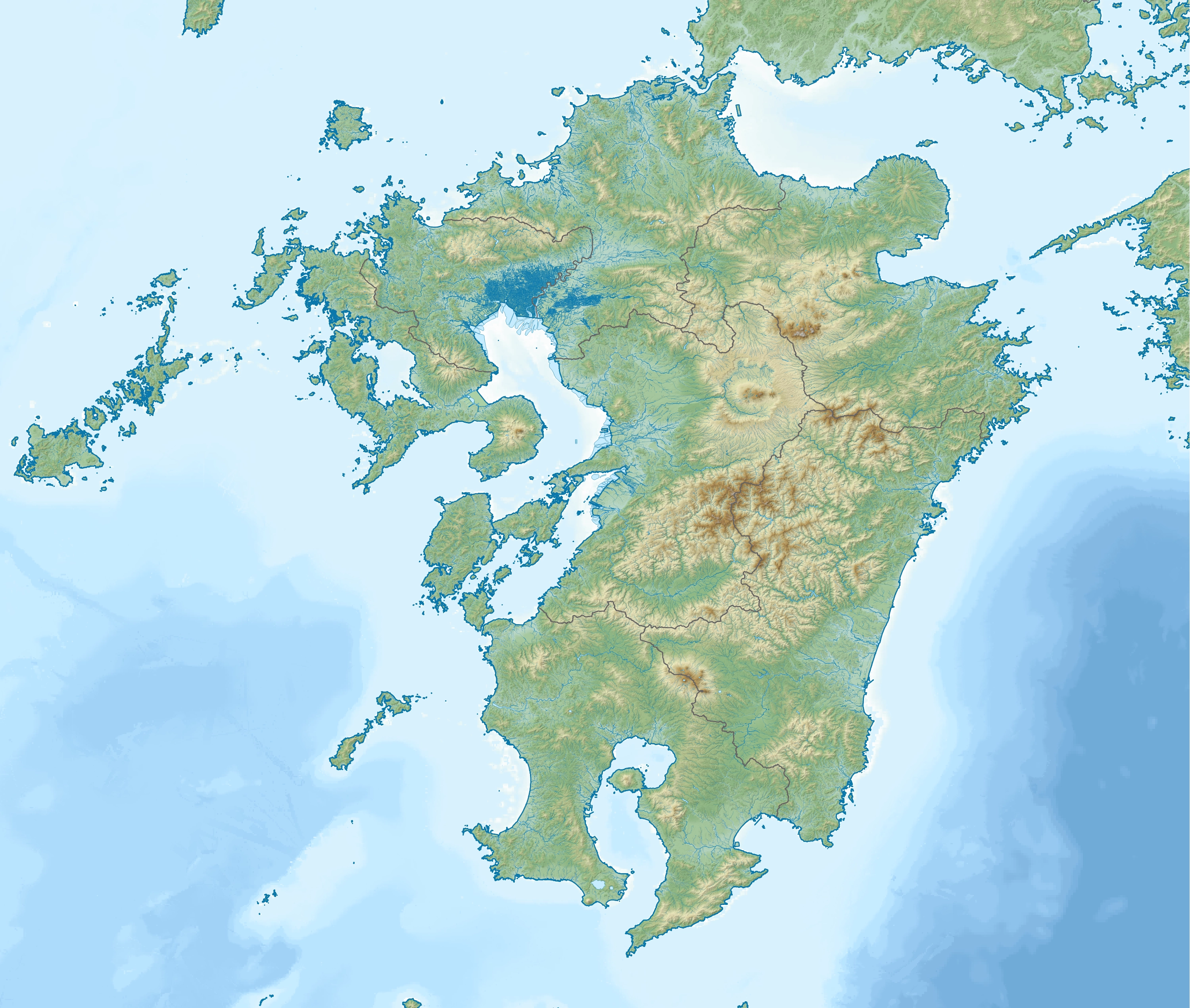
- Location within Kyushu Location within Japan
- Location: Kyūshū, Japan
- Coordinates: 32°53′06″N 131°06′15″E
- Area: 726.78 km^{2} (280.61 sq mi)
- Established: 4 December 1934
- Governing body: Ministry of the Environment (Japan)

Aso-Kujū National Park (阿蘇くじゅう国立公園, Aso-Kujū Kokuritsu Kōen) is a national park in Kumamoto and Ōita Prefectures, Japan. The park derives its name from Mount Aso, the largest active volcano in Japan, and the Kujū mountains. Mount Aso is also one of the largest caldera volcanos in the world.

== History ==
Around 270,000 years ago, a burst of volcanic activity helped shape the area.

Aso Shrine at Mount Aso in Kyushu is a Shinto shrine traditionally held to have been a center of worship before the accession of Emperor Jinmu. The shikinaisha shrine complex at Ichinomiya in what is today Kumamoto Prefecture was said to have been established in 281 BC. The original location of the shrine is uncertain because it was destroyed and rebuilt many times in or near the crater of Aso-san.

- On December 4, 1934, this park was first established as Aso National Park.
- On September 1, 1953, Mt. Yufu, Mt. Tsurumi, and Mt. Takasaki in Oita Prefecture were designated as extensions.
- On May 1, 1956, Mt. Takasaki was separated and incorporated into the Seto Inland Sea National Park.
- On June 25, 1964, the Yamanami Highway was put into service as the "Toll Road Beppu Aso Road".
- On September 10, 1986, the name was changed to Aso Kujū National Park.
- On June 25, 1994, the Yamanami Highway was opened free of charge due to the expiration of the toll collection period.

== Activities ==
- Soak in natural hot springs at Sujiyu Onsen Public Bath.
- Camping is easily accessible with their many campsites, such as Kuju Kogen Soumi and Kokonoe Green Park campgrounds.
- Natural spring water can be collected at the Shirakawa Fountainhead. Water from the Shirakawa River irrigates rice and vegetable farms in Kumamoto.
- Various hiking and biking trails have been established at the park. Horseback rides are also available.

== Related municipalities ==
- Kumamoto: Aso, Kikuchi, Minamiaso, Minamioguni, Oguni, Ōzu, Takamori, Ubuyama
- Ōita: Beppu, Kokonoe, Kusu, Taketa, Yufu

== See also ==
- List of national parks of Japan
- Kyushu, Japan
- Oita Prefecture
- Kumamoto Prefecture
