= Mount Kujū =

Highest mountain on the island of Kyushu, Japan

- 九重山
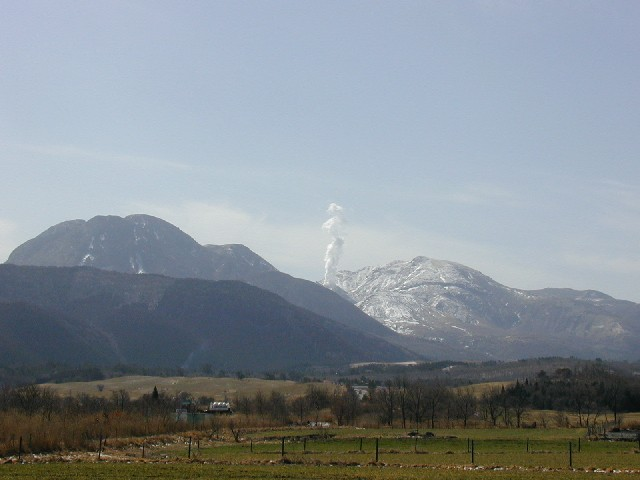
- Kujū Mountains

Highest point
- Elevation: 1,791 m (5,876 ft)
- Prominence: 1,791 m (5,876 ft)
- Listing: Ultra; 100 Famous Japanese Mountains
- Coordinates: 33°04′54″N 131°14′24″E

Naming
- Language of name: Japanese

Geography
- Location within Japan
- Location: On the border of Kokonoe and Taketa, Ōita, Japan
- Parent range: Kujū Mountains

Geology
- Mountain type: Stratovolcano
- Last eruption: 1995 to 1996

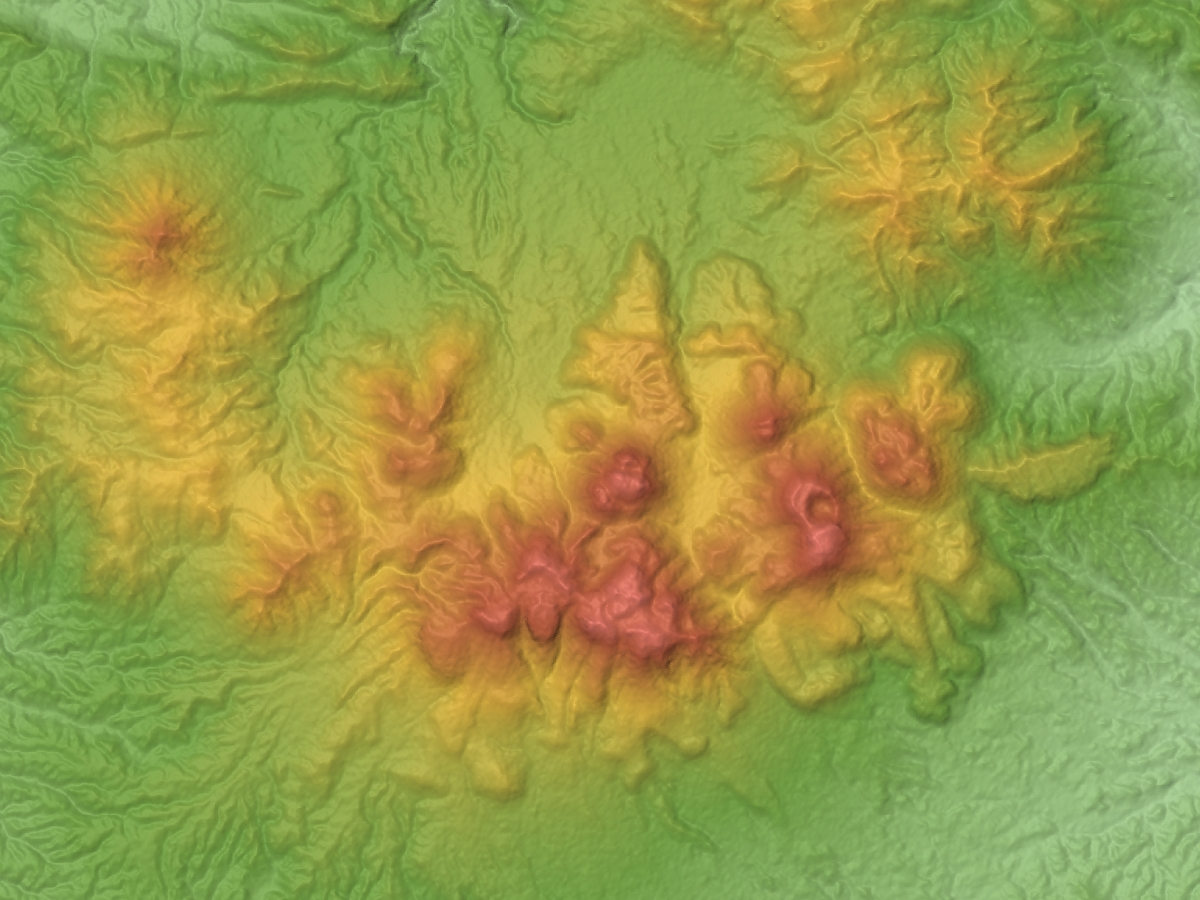
Kuju Volcano

Mount Kujū (くじゅう山, Kujū-san), located on the border of Kokonoe and Taketa in Ōita Prefecture, Japan, is a stratovolcano in Kyushu Island, Japan, with a summit elevation of 1,791 metres (5,876 ft). It is one of the 100 Famous Japanese Mountains. It is part of the Aso-Kujū National Park.

== Summary ==
The Kujū range consists of a dozen or so volcanic bodies gathered in a region of 13 km east-west and 10 km north-south. The mountains in the range include:

- Kujū Mountains
  - Mount Kujū (1,787 m)- The main peak (久住山)
  - Mount Nakadake (1,791 m)- The highest peak in Kyushu
  - Mount Inahoshi (1,774 m)
  - Mount Hōsshō (1,762 m)
  - Mount Mimata (1,745 m)
- Taisen Mountains
  - Mount Taisen (1,786 m)
  - Mount North (Kita) Taisen (1,706 m)
  - Mount Heiji (1,642 m)

The Kujū volcanic group is mainly composed of andesite and dacite, which is defined as the volcanic activity above the Miyagi pyroclastic flow deposit which formed about 200,000 years ago. The north and south areas of Mt. Kujū are plateau grasslands whose main industry is dairy farming.

== Gallery ==
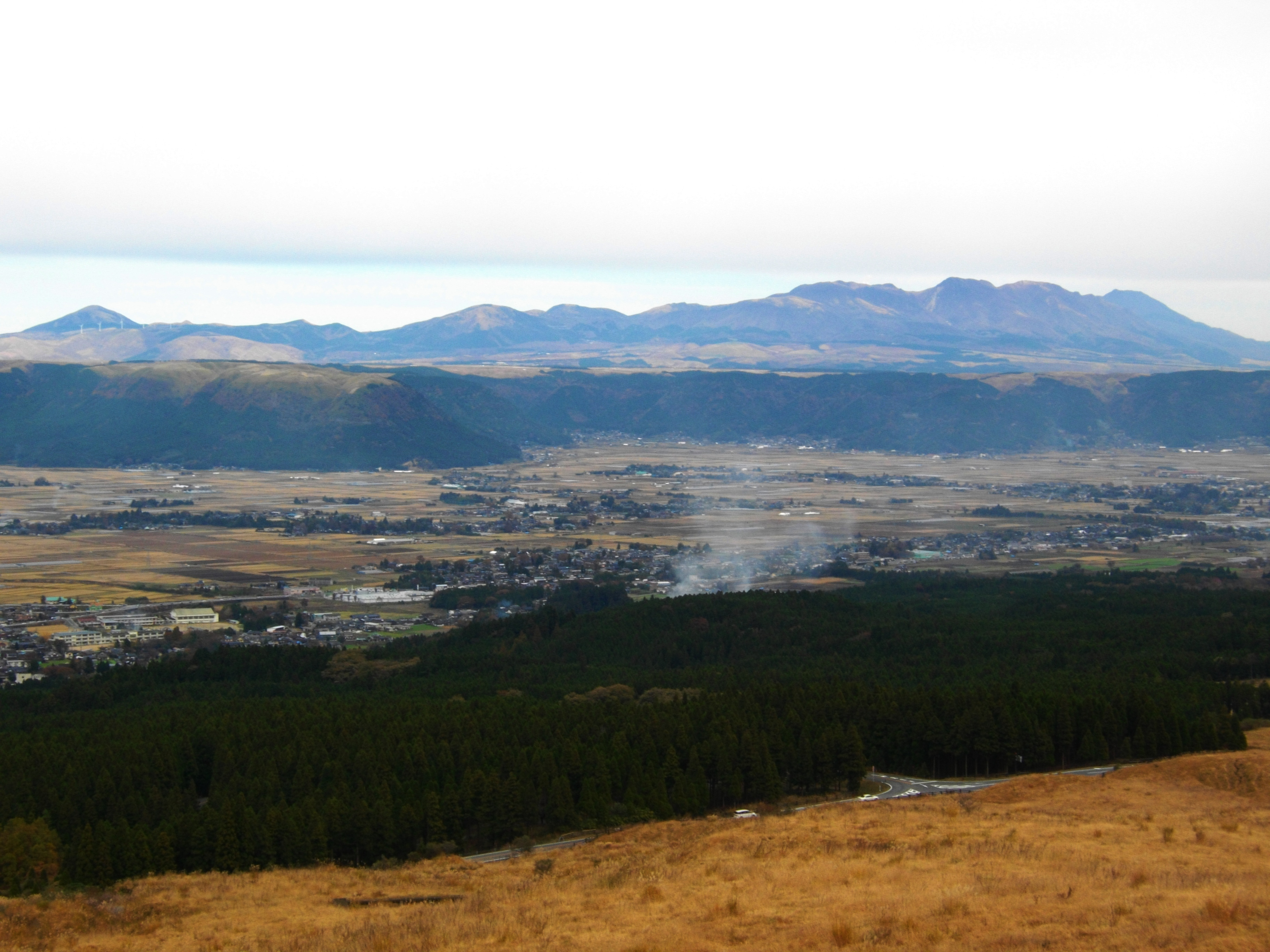
Mount Kujū from Mount Aso

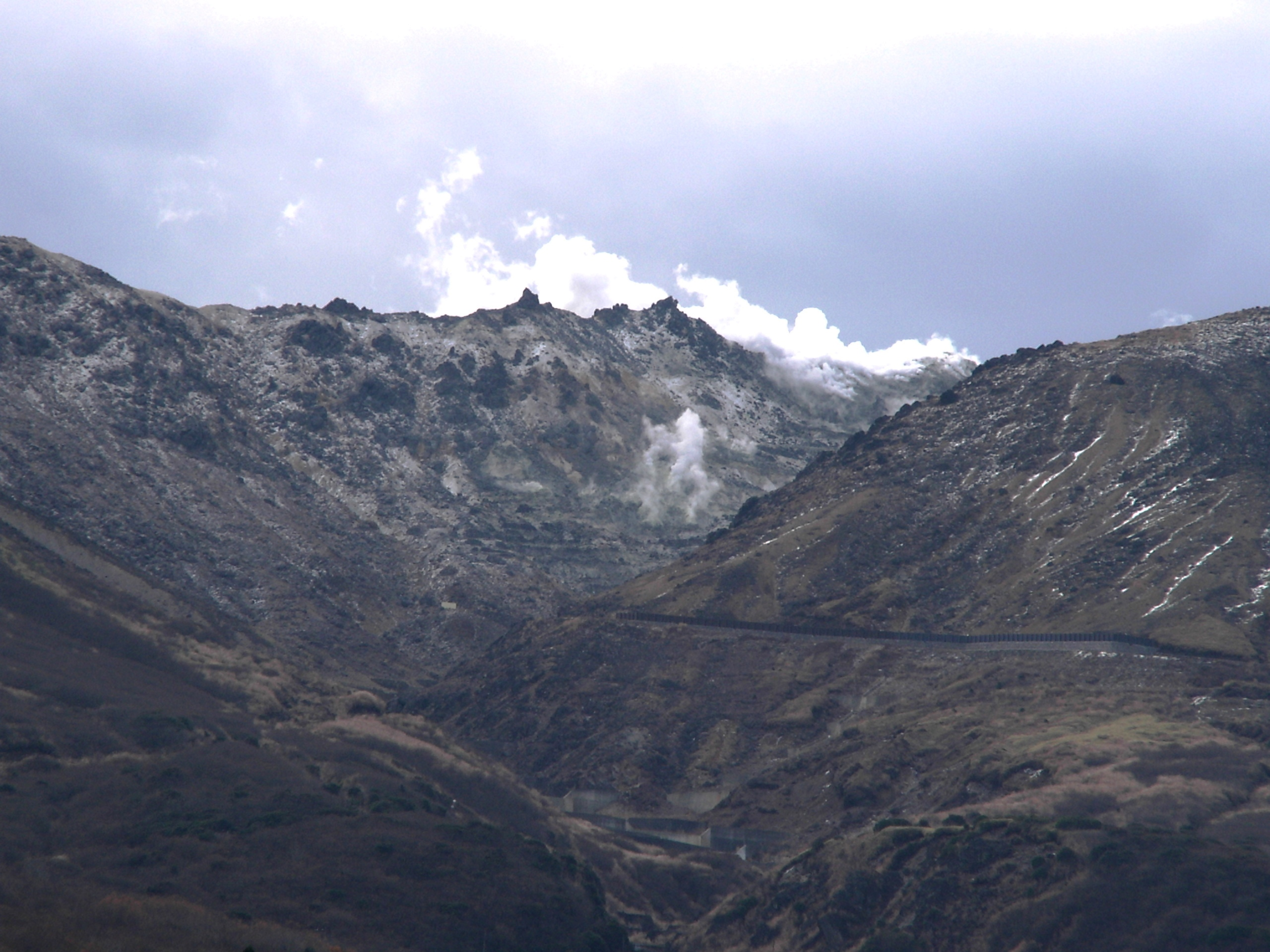
Mount Iō from Chōjabaru

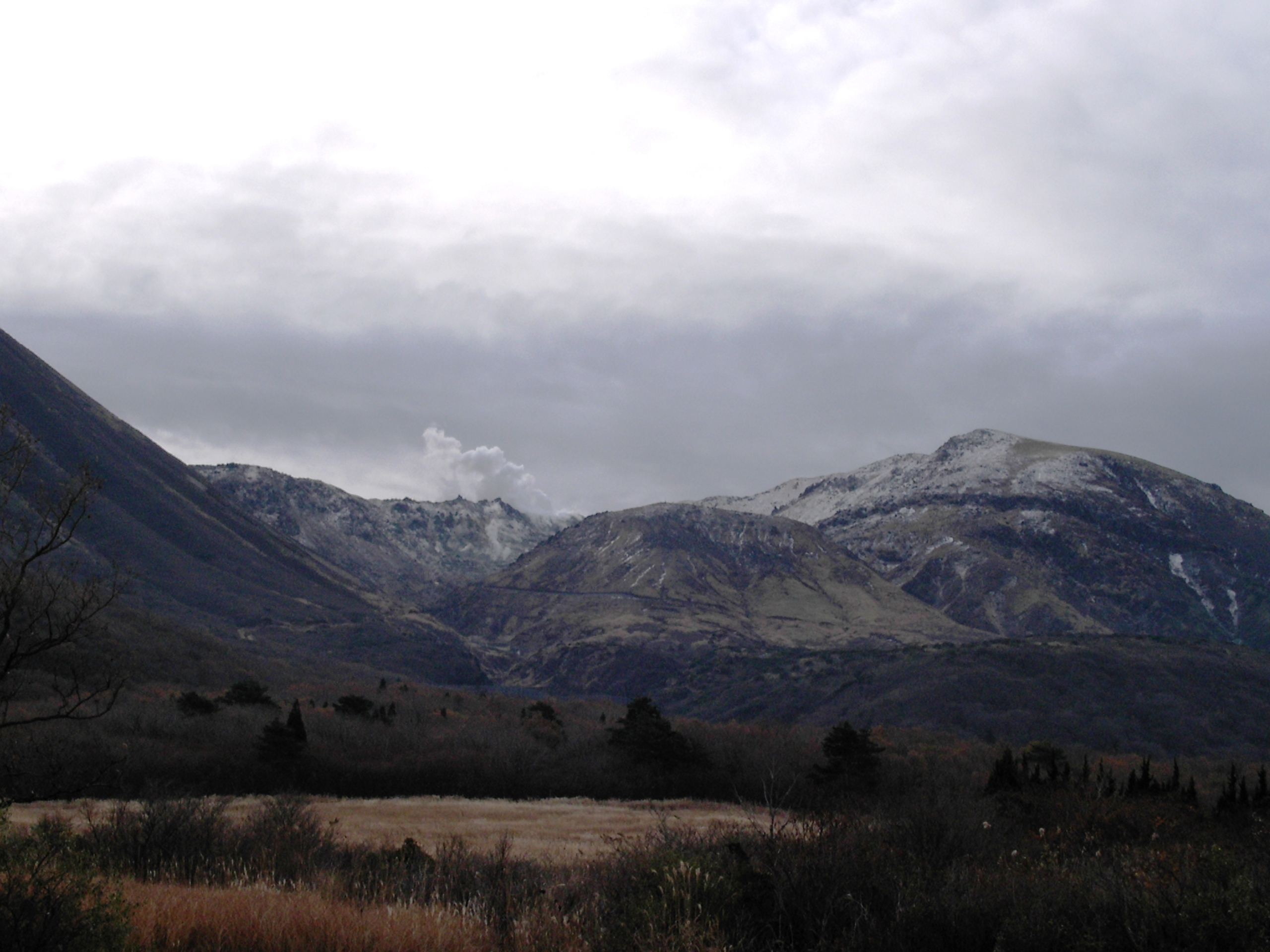
Mount Hōsshō and Mount Iō from Chōjabaru

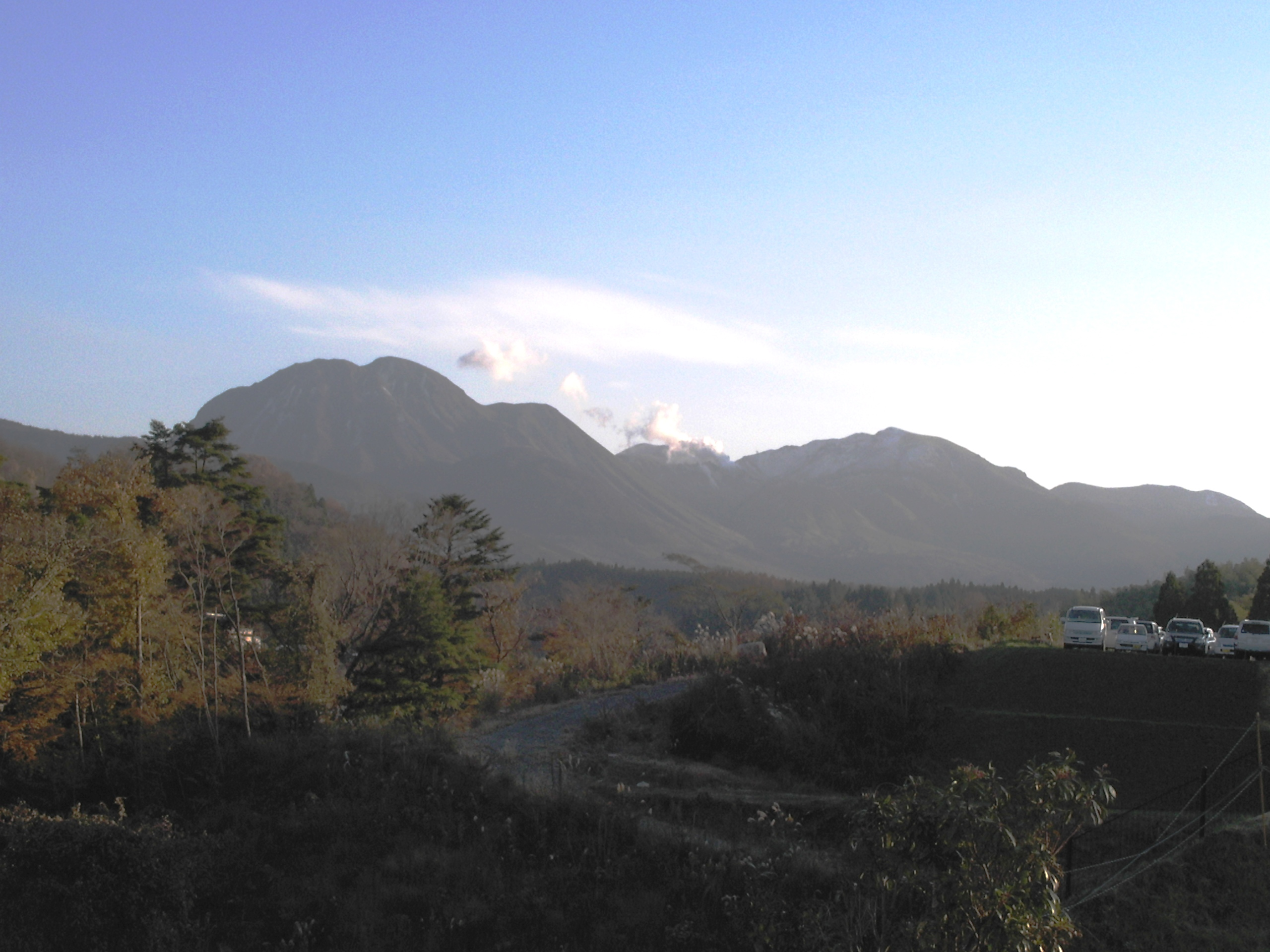
Mount Kujū from Narukogawa Gorge

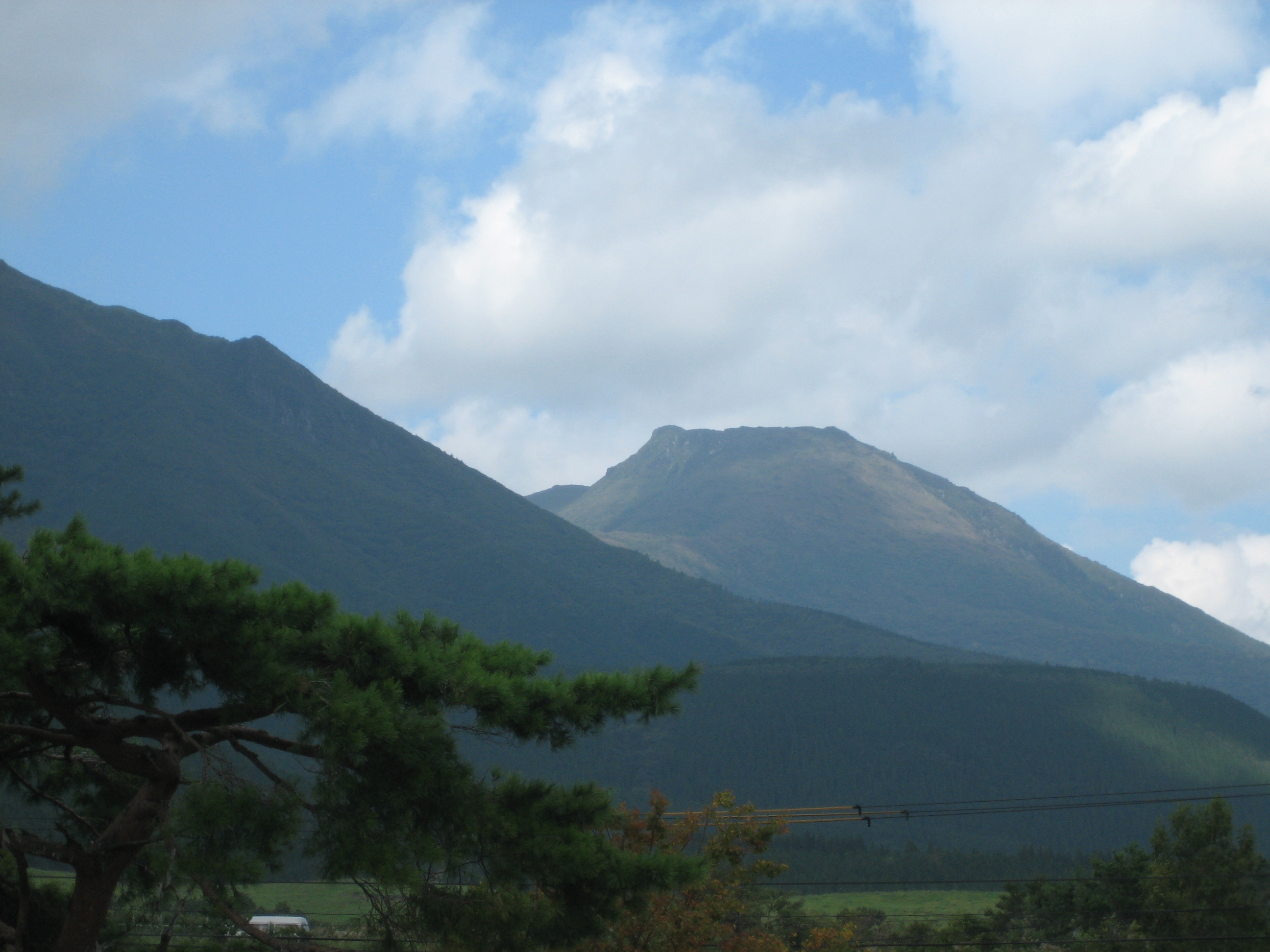
Mount Taisen

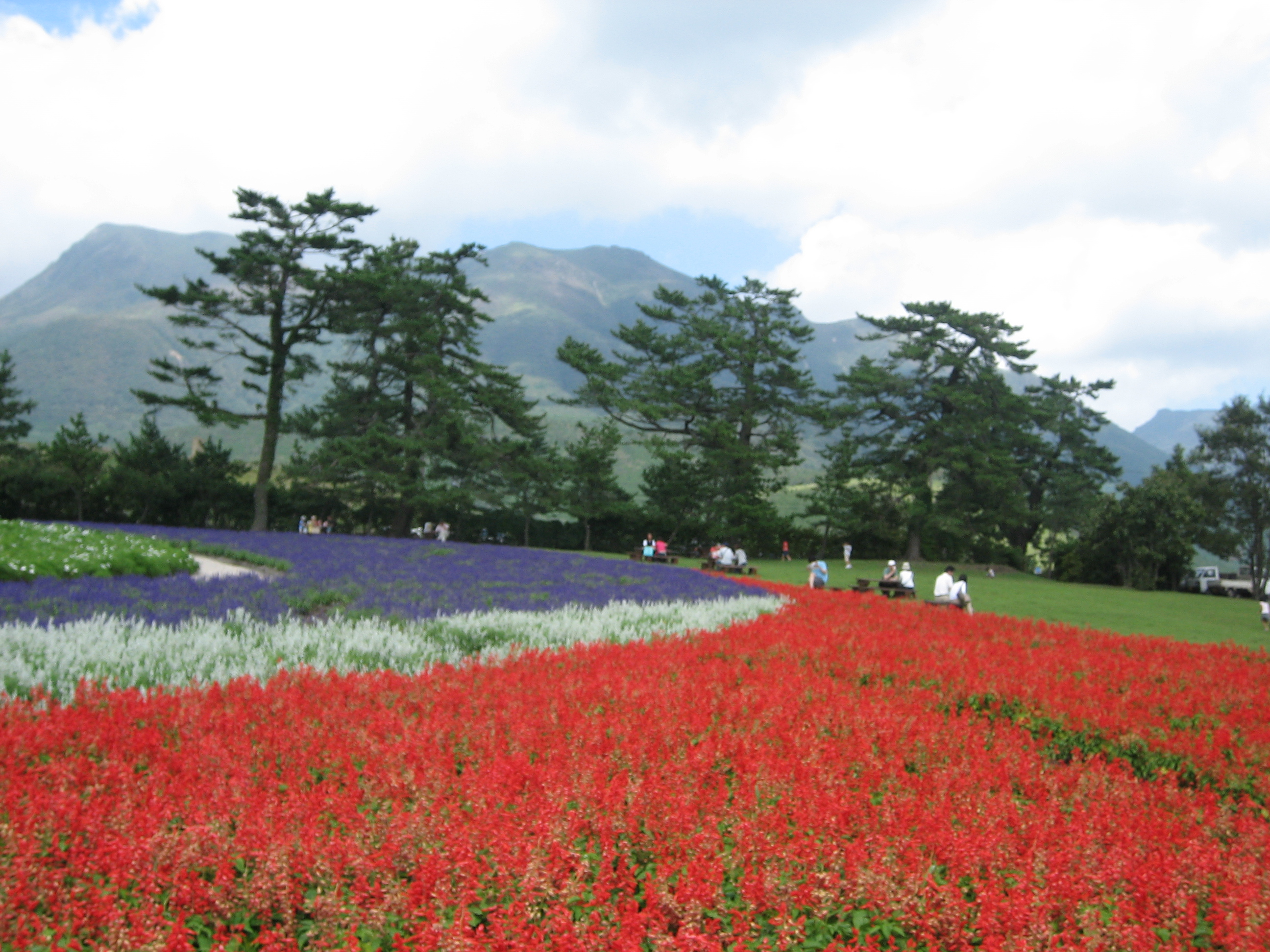
Kujū Flower Gardens and Kujū Mountains

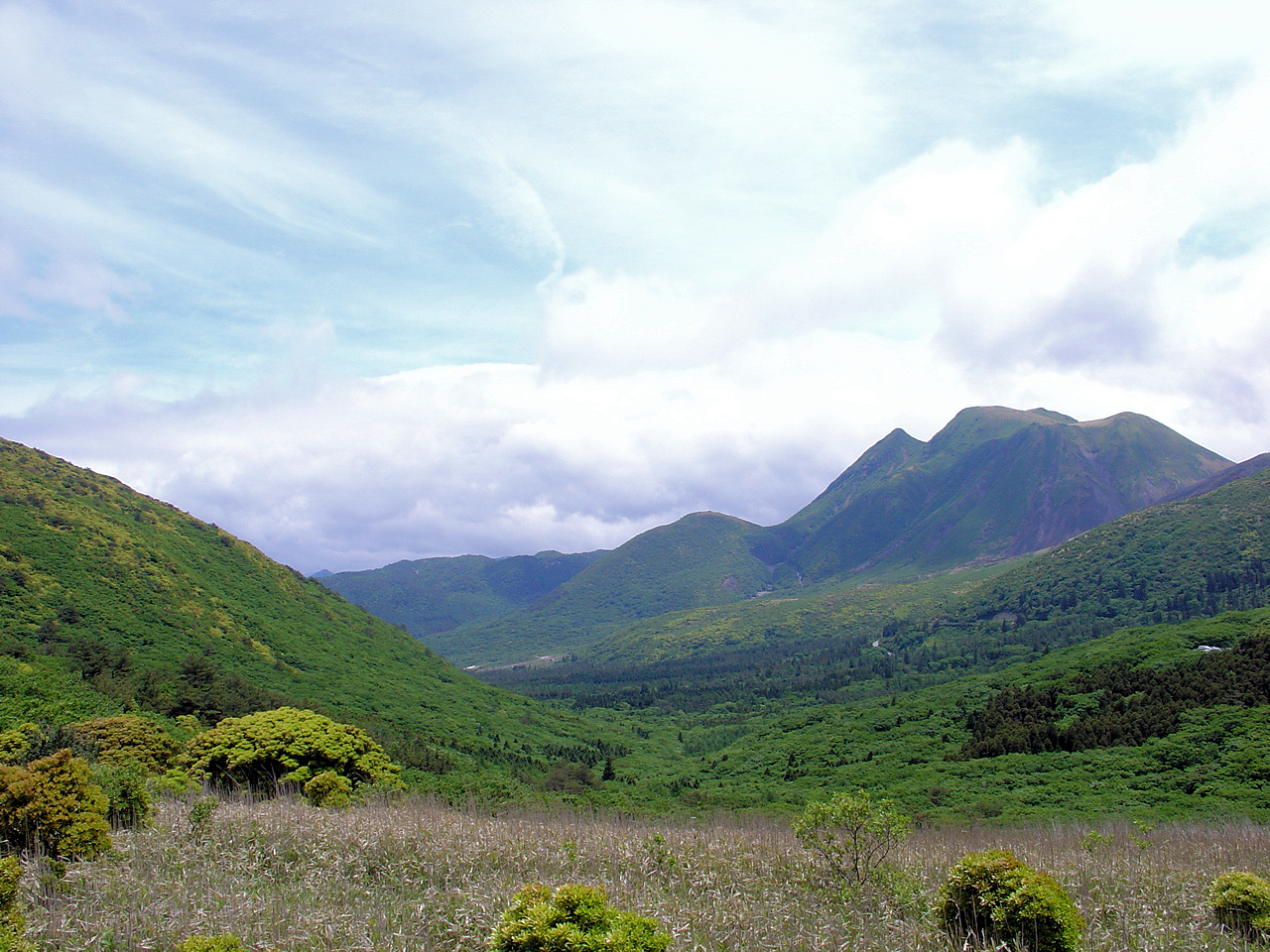
Mount Kujū from Makinoto Pass with Mount Mimata on the right

== See also ==
- List of ultras of Japan
