= Mount Aso =

Volcano in Kumamoto Prefecture, Japan

- Aso Volcano
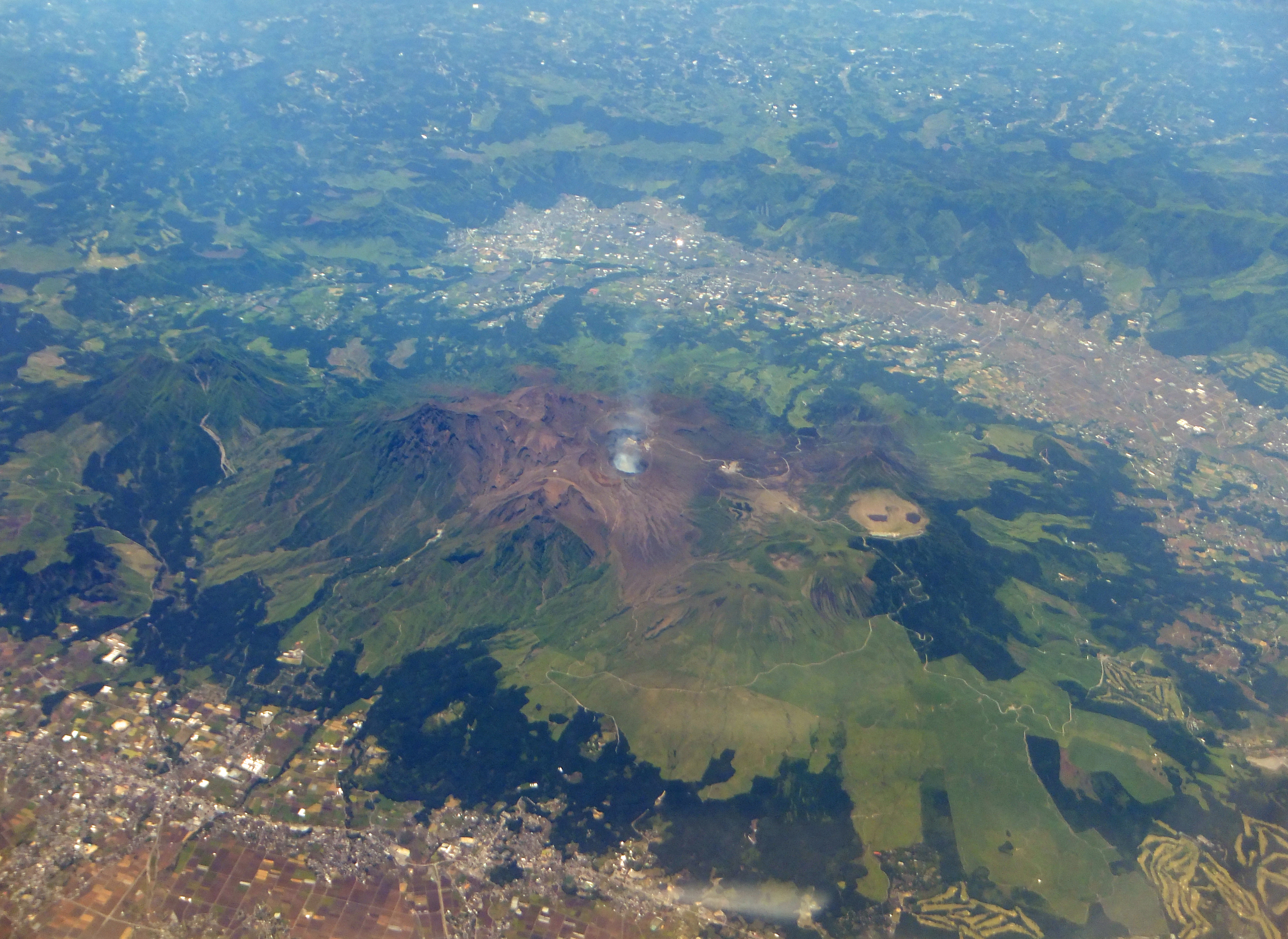
- Aerial image of Mount Aso

Highest point
- Coordinates: 32°53′04″N 131°06′14″E

Geography
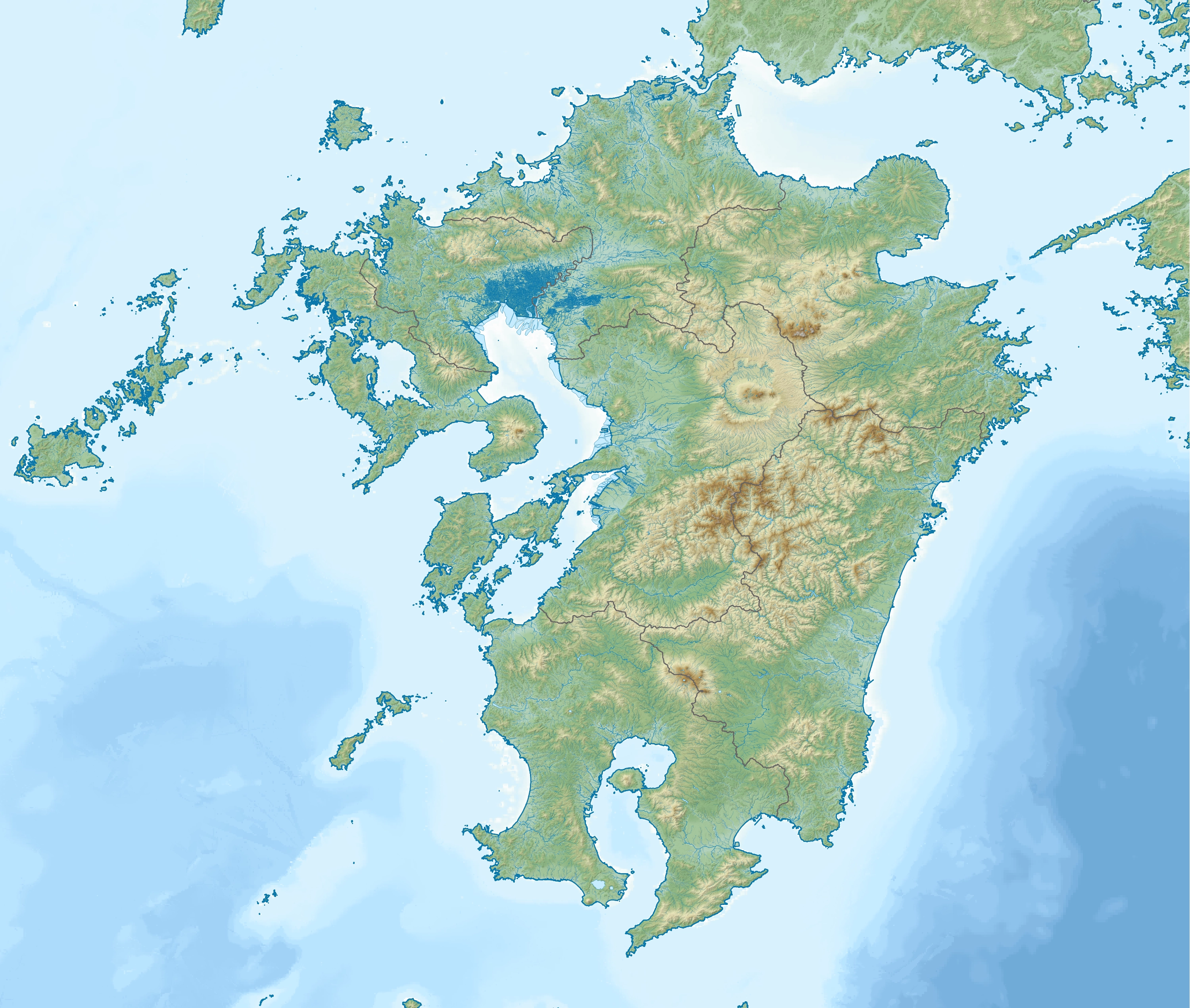
- Location within Kyushu Location within Kumamoto Prefecture Location within Japan
- Location: Kyushu, Japan

Geology
- Mountain type: Somma volcano in Caldera complex
- Last eruption: 20 October 2021 - Present

Mount Aso (阿蘇山, Aso-san) or Aso Volcano is the second largest active volcano in Japan after Mount Fuji, and among the largest in the world. Common use relates often only to the somma volcano in the centre of Aso Caldera. It stands in Aso Kujū National Park in Kumamoto Prefecture, on the island of Kyushu. Its tallest peak, Takadake, is 1,592 meters (5,223 ft) above sea level. Mount Aso is in a fairly large caldera (25 kilometers (16 miles) north-south and 18 km (11 mi) east-west) with a circumference of around 120 km (75 mi), although sources vary on the exact distance. It is one of the 100 Famous Japanese Mountains.

== Geography ==
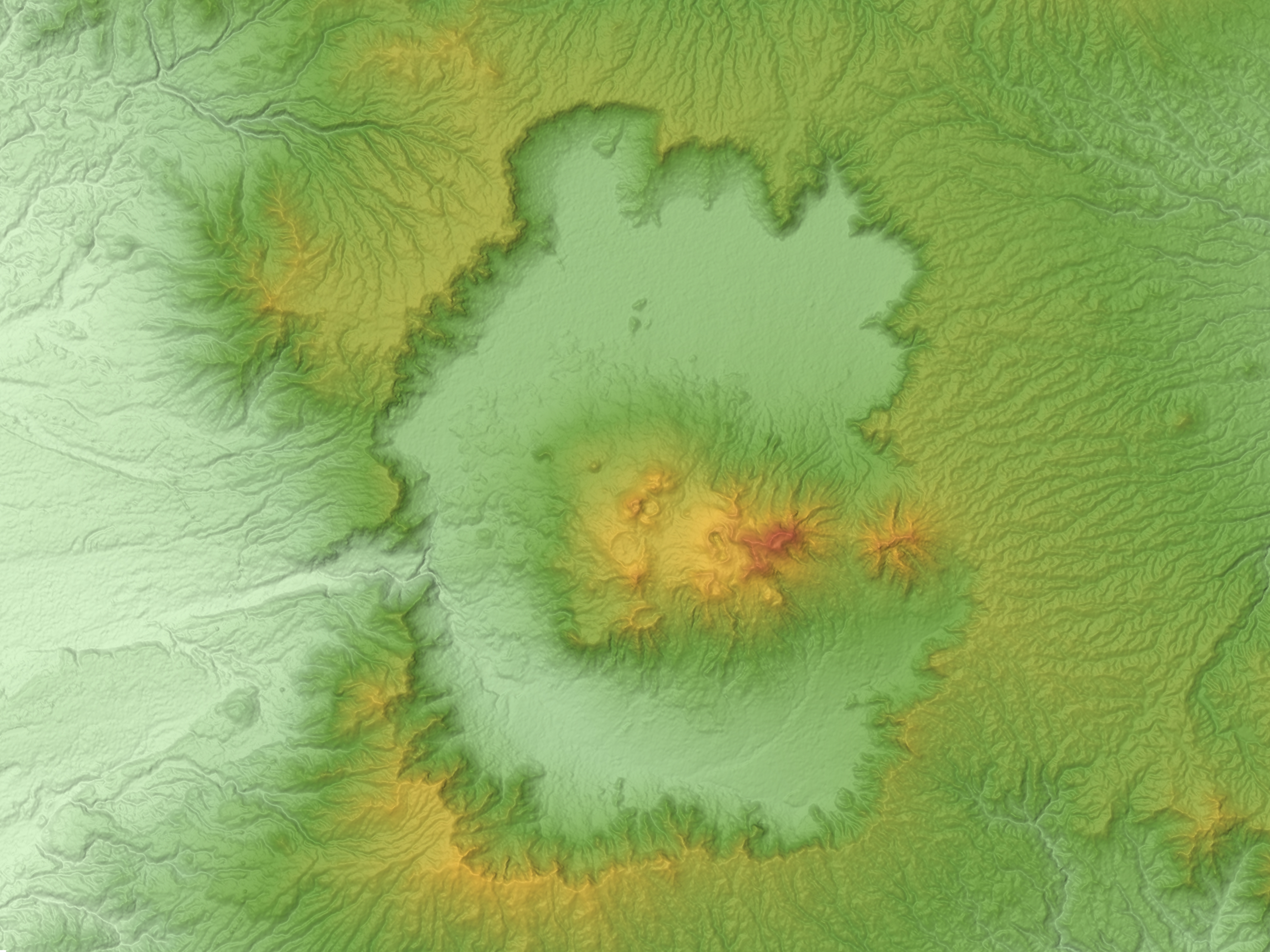
Aso Caldera topographic map

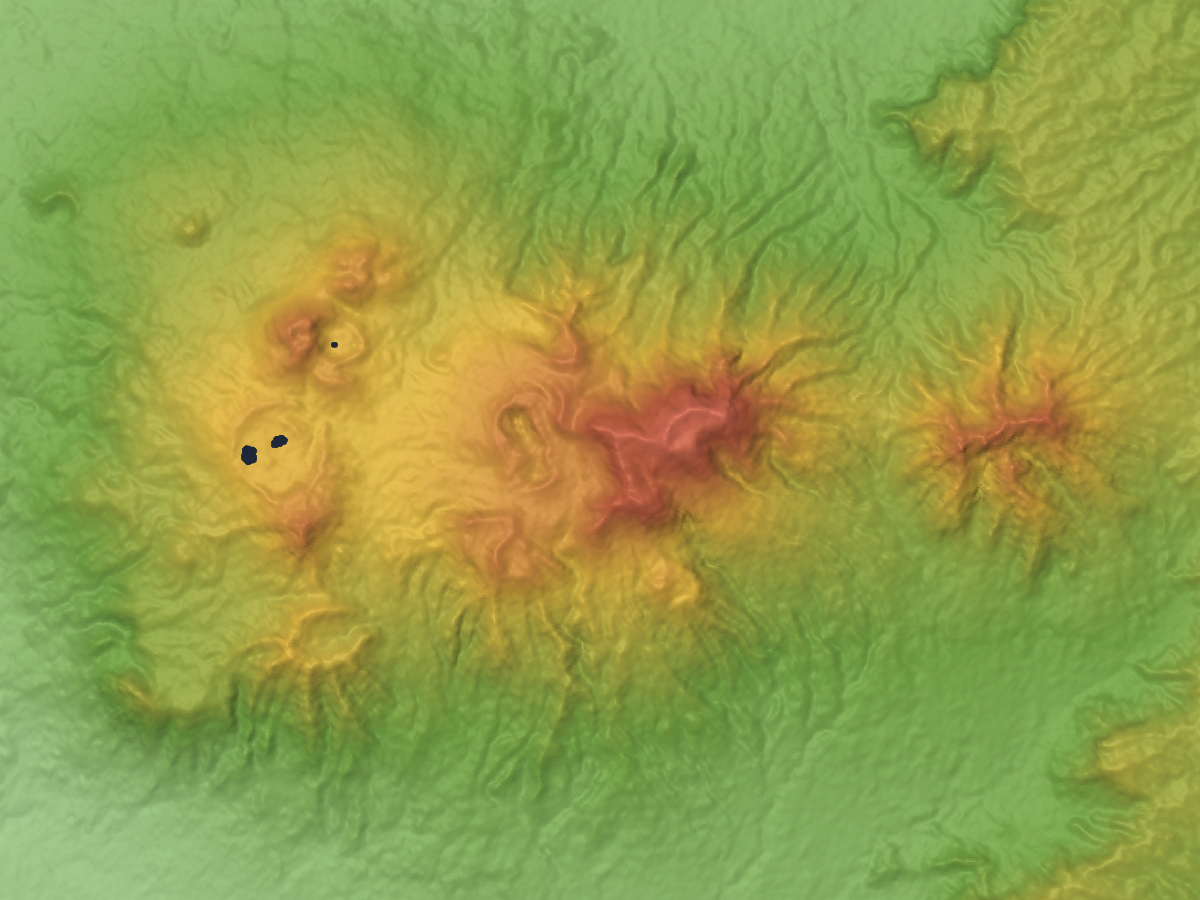
Central Cone

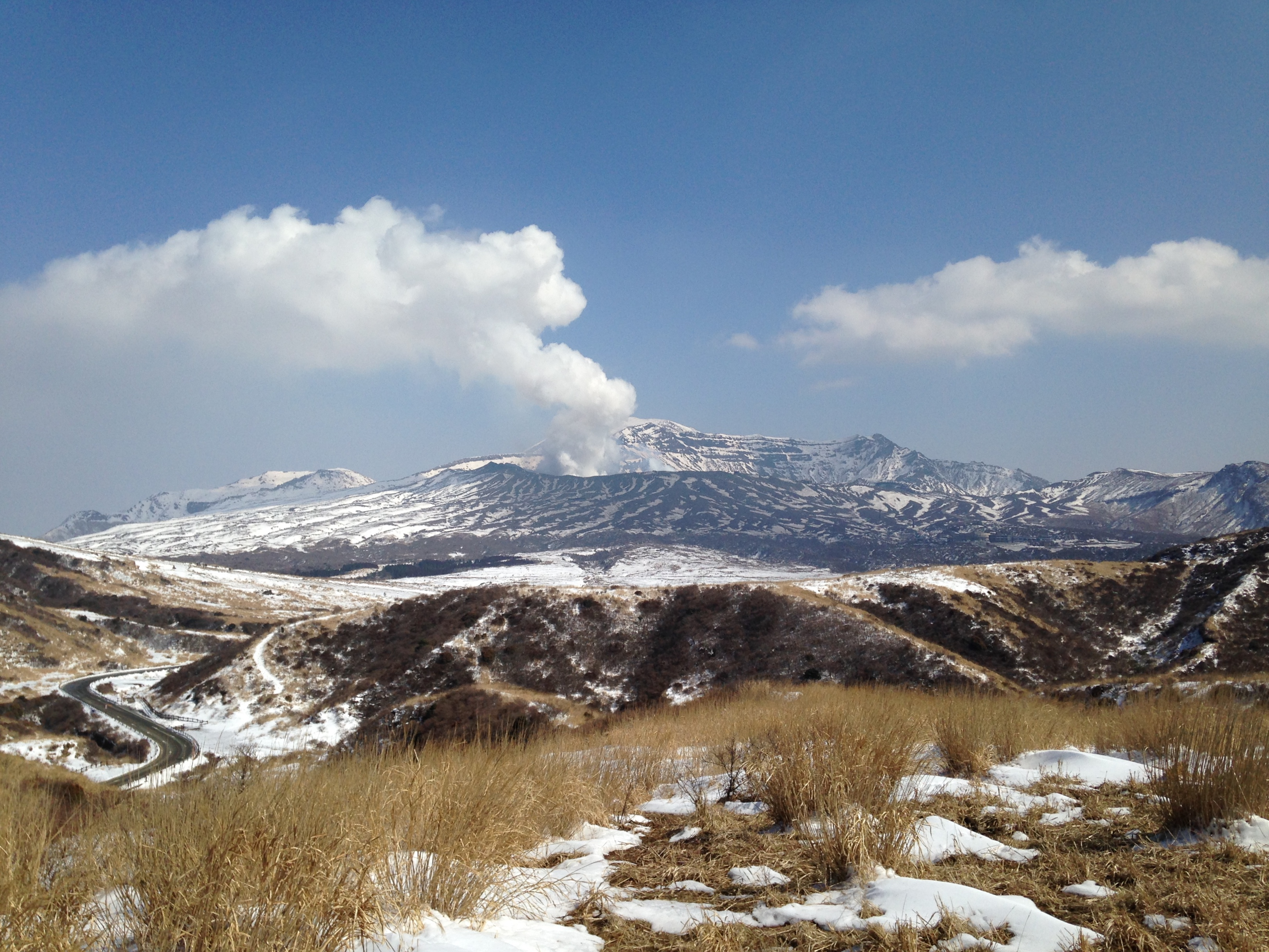
Mount Naka (Naka volcano)

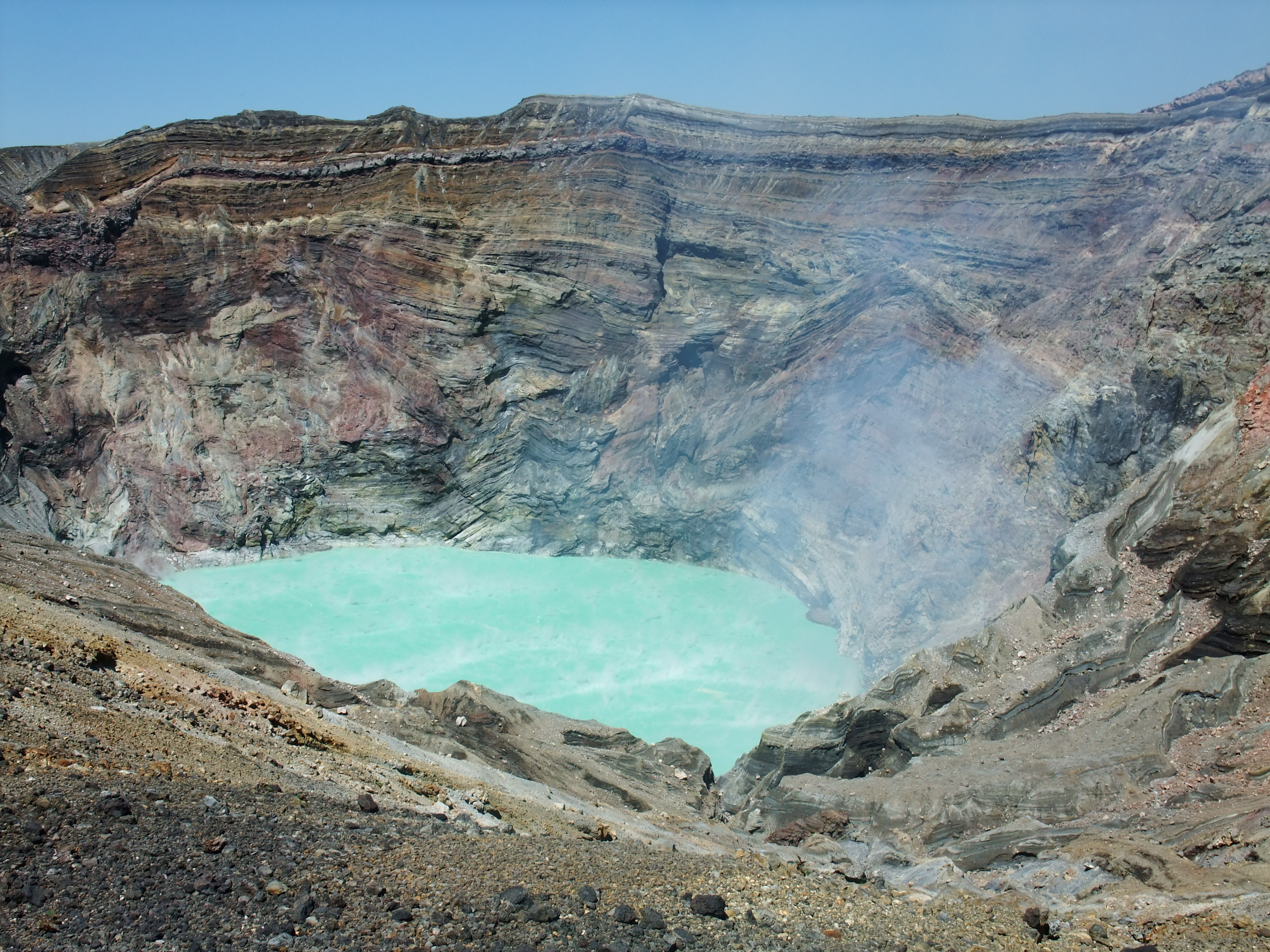
The steaming crater of Mount Naka

The central cone group of Aso consists of five peaks, often called the "Five Mountains of Aso" (阿蘇五岳): Mt. Neko, Mt. Taka (also called Takadake or Taka-Dake), Mt. Naka (also called Nakadake or Naka-Dake), Mt. Eboshi, and Mt. Kishima (also called Kishimadake or Kishima-Dake). The highest point is the summit of Mt. Taka, at 1,592 m above sea level. The crater of Mt. Naka, the west side of which is accessible by road, contains an active volcano which continuously emits smoke and has occasional eruptions. Only the northernmost crater (the first crater) has been active for the last 70 years—1974, 1979, 1984–1985, 1989–1991, 2009, 2011, 2015, 2016 and 2021.

The present Aso Caldera formed as a result of four huge caldera eruptions occurring over a range of 90,000–300,000 years ago. The caldera, one of the largest in the world, contains the city of Aso as well as Takamori and Minamiaso. The caldera extends about 18 km east to west and about 25 km north to south. Viewpoints from the somma overlooking the caldera are perched upon lava formed before the volcanic activity which created the present caldera. Ejecta from the huge caldera eruption 90,800 years ago covers more than 600 km^{3} and roughly equals the volume of Mount Fuji; with a pyroclastic flow plateau that covered a significant part of Kyushu.

Volcanic ash from Mount Aso and Mount Kujū plays a crucial role in maintaining and replenishing the tidal flats of the Ariake Sea, which are among the largest in Japan. Several of the flats have been designated as Ramsar sites. The ash is carried from the volcanoes to the coastline by the Chikugo River, which has its source located on Aso as well.

== History ==
The eruption which formed the present somma occurred approximately 300,000 years ago. Four large-scale eruptions (Aso 1 – 4) occurred during a period extending from 300,000 to 90,000 years ago. As large amounts of pyroclastic flow and volcanic ash were emitted from the volcanic chamber, a huge depression (caldera) was formed as the chamber collapsed. The fourth eruption (Aso 4) was the largest, with volcanic ash covering the entire Kyushu region and even extending to Yamaguchi Prefecture.

Mt. Taka, Mt. Naka, Mt. Eboshi, and Mt. Kishima are cones formed following the fourth above-mentioned huge caldera eruption. Mt. Naka remains active today. Aso's pyroclastic flow deposits (welded tuff) were utilized for bridge construction in the region. There are approximately 320 arched stone bridges in Kumamoto Prefecture, including the Tsujun-kyo and Reitai-kyo bridges on the Midorikawa River, which are important national cultural properties.

A new eruption began at 11:43 a.m. on 20 October 2021.

== Climate ==
With an elevation of 1,143 metres (3,750 ft)., Mount Aso has a climate that falls as humid continental (Köppen climate classification "Dfb"), with warm summers and cold winters. Precipitation is high throughout the year, which brings the area to have borderline subtropical characteristics as well. It is particularly heavy in June and July, when over 500 millimetres (20 in) of rain fell in each month.

Climate data for Mount Aso, 1991–2020 normals, extremes 1932–2017
Month	Jan	Feb	Mar	Apr	May	Jun	Jul	Aug	Sep	Oct	Nov	Dec	Year
Record high °C (°F)	14.0 (57.2)	16.6 (61.9)	19.3 (66.7)	23.8 (74.8)	27.2 (81.0)	27.2 (81.0)	29.6 (85.3)	29.8 (85.6)	28.0 (82.4)	25.1 (77.2)	20.7 (69.3)	15.8 (60.4)	29.8 (85.6)
Mean daily maximum °C (°F)	1.9 (35.4)	4.0 (39.2)	8.0 (46.4)	13.4 (56.1)	17.9 (64.2)	20.0 (68.0)	23.4 (74.1)	24.3 (75.7)	21.5 (70.7)	16.5 (61.7)	10.7 (51.3)	4.6 (40.3)	13.8 (56.9)
Daily mean °C (°F)	−1.4 (29.5)	0.1 (32.2)	3.6 (38.5)	8.9 (48.0)	13.5 (56.3)	16.7 (62.1)	20.1 (68.2)	20.6 (69.1)	17.7 (63.9)	12.4 (54.3)	6.9 (44.4)	1.0 (33.8)	10.0 (50.0)
Mean daily minimum °C (°F)	−4.5 (23.9)	−3.6 (25.5)	−0.3 (31.5)	5.0 (41.0)	9.8 (49.6)	14.0 (57.2)	17.8 (64.0)	18.2 (64.8)	14.9 (58.8)	9.0 (48.2)	3.4 (38.1)	−2.2 (28.0)	6.8 (44.2)
Record low °C (°F)	−15.4 (4.3)	−15.9 (3.4)	−13.1 (8.4)	−7.6 (18.3)	−1.0 (30.2)	5.5 (41.9)	9.8 (49.6)	10.5 (50.9)	4.5 (40.1)	−4.0 (24.8)	−7.7 (18.1)	−13.0 (8.6)	−15.9 (3.4)
Average precipitation mm (inches)	93.5 (3.68)	132.6 (5.22)	215.7 (8.49)	230.3 (9.07)	272.6 (10.73)	712.8 (28.06)	634.1 (24.96)	348.4 (13.72)	287.4 (11.31)	133.5 (5.26)	122.4 (4.82)	86.9 (3.42)	3,270.2 (128.74)
Average snowfall cm (inches)	26 (10)	21 (8.3)	9 (3.5)	1 (0.4)	0 (0)	0 (0)	0 (0)	0 (0)	0 (0)	0 (0)	1 (0.4)	14 (5.5)	72 (28.1)
Average precipitation days (≥ 1.0 mm)	8.9	9.4	12.4	11.5	11.7	16.7	16.5	14.6	12.0	8.8	8.7	8.3	139.5
Average snowy days (≥ 1 cm)	6.1	5.0	1.9	0.2	0	0	0	0	0	0	0.3	4.1	17.6
Average relative humidity (%)	84	79	76	73	74	86	90	88	85	80	80	82	81
Mean monthly sunshine hours	92.1	111.8	139.8	157.7	168.0	100.1	114.5	131.9	127.2	148.2	120.4	107.9	1,525.4
Source 1: JMA
Source 2: JMA

== National Park ==
The mountain is a key feature that contributed to the original Aso National Park. Spectacular sights such as the seasonal flowering of Rhododendron kiusianum on the slopes of Takadake reflect significant protected botanical ecosystems.

== Tourism ==
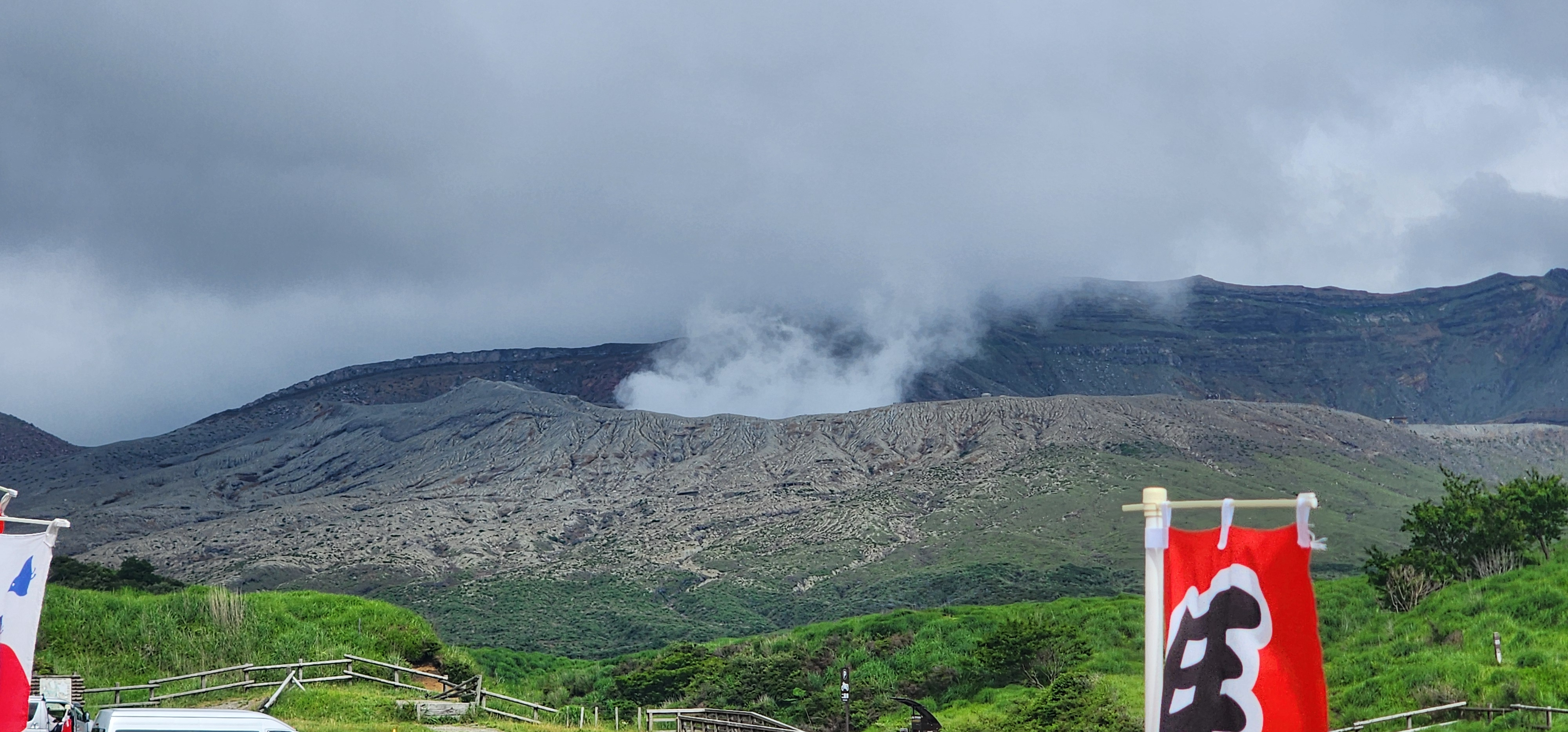
Mount Aso as seen from the volcano museum.

Aso has been considered as a sacred place since long time ago. It became a mountain for training and worship. Before the Meiji era, there was only one hiking path from Bauchuu, near the current Aso station.

Foreigners visited Mount Aso for the first time during the Meiji era for tourism and research. A new hiking path from the south of the mountain became famous, as more and more local visitors came.

During the Taishō era, the Miyaji line opened. There were more than 100,000 visitors every year. In 1934, the area was established as Aso National Park.

At the foot of the mountain there are also various campsites, and horse riding at Kusasenrigahama. There are also helicopter tours and bicycle tours.

=== Cable car ===
A cable car system, the Mount Aso Ropeway, opened on 10 April 1958 to provide access to the mountain. The system ran for the last time in August 2014, then closed due to higher volcanic alert level. In 2015 and 2016, the system was damaged by volcanic ash and earthquakes. It was totally dismantled in 2019. From February 2018, a shuttle bus runs from the original station, now Mount Aso terminal to the crater's edge .

=== Onsen ===
Because Mount Aso is a volcano, there are many onsen hot springs areas, such as Uchinomaki, Asoakamizu, and Kurokawa.

=== Current closure ===
As of May 2026, the crater is closed to visitors due to a not yet recovered helicopter wreck on the southeast slope. The helicopter crashed in January 2026 but the conditions inside the crater prevent safe access for recovery personnel.

== Hiking ==
Mt. Aso has numerous hiking trails leading to the peaks and mountains around the crater. Nearly all of the trails (excluding Nekodake) can be accessed from the bus stop at the museum.

== In popular culture ==
In Ishirō Honda's kaiju films, Mount Aso is home to the giant pteranodon kaiju Rodan. In Rodan, the creature and its mate perish when the volcano erupts.

Mount Aso serves as the inspiration of Mt. Chimney in Pokémon Ruby and Sapphire, Pokémon Emerald and the remake Pokémon Omega Ruby and Alpha Sapphire.

In the manga Magical Girl Spec-Ops Asuka by Makoto Fukami and Seigo Tokiya, the final battle of the Distonian War that took place 3 years before the events of the series takes place on Mount Aso.

In the 2006 tokusatsu disaster film Sinking of Japan directed by Shinji Higuchi, Mount Aso erupts as an aircraft carrying the Japanese Prime Minister flies over it, raking the plane with flying rocks and causing it to crash with the loss of all on board. Mount Aso's eruption also destroys the city of Kumamoto.

Mount Aso also appears in Kaidō Battle 2: Chain Reaction and Tokyo Xtreme Racer: Drift 2.

== See also ==
- List of volcanoes in Japan
- Aso Shrine
- Aso Volcano Museum
