= Birthplace of the Miyazaki Brothers =

- 宮崎兄弟の生家
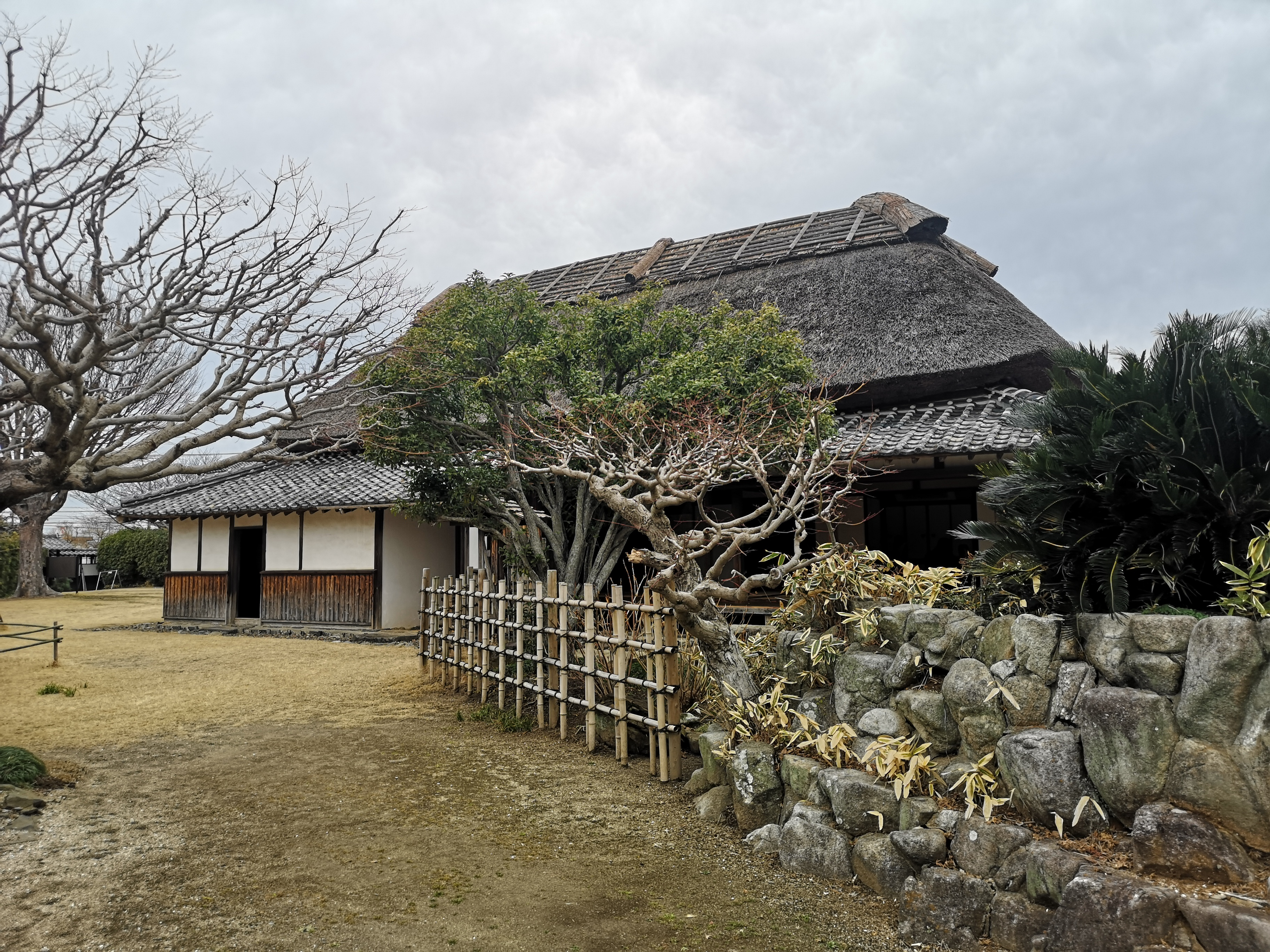
- Established: June 1993
- Location: Arao, Kumamoto
- Type: History museum
- Website: Official Page

Birthplace of the Miyazaki Brothers (Japanese: 宮崎兄弟の生家, Hepburn: Miyazaki Kyōdai no Seika) is a cultural heritage site and museum in Arao City, Japan. It is a designated historical property of Kumamoto Prefecture. The site is dedicated to the Miyazaki Brothers: Hachirō, Tōten, Tamizō, and Yazō, and their connection to Sun Yat-sen, the leader of the 1911 Revolution. There is also a museum, the Miyazaki Brothers Museum built on the property.

== History ==
=== Establishment of the house ===
It is believed that the founder of the Miyazaki family, Yajihei Masayuki Miyazaki moved from Hizen Province in the Saga District to the town of Arao, Kumamoto (then part of the Tamana district of the Higo Province) in 1647.

=== Time of the Miyazaki brothers ===
Tōten Miyazaki and his siblings are known for supporting Sun Yat-sen's revolutionary movement. After the failure of his first revolution in 1895, Sun Yat-sen went into exile in America and England, before arriving to Japan in 1897. To protect Sun from the authorities, Tōten invited him to the Miyazaki home, where he stayed for 10 days to 2 weeks. In 1913, after the successful 1911 Revolution, Sun again visited the house to express his gratitude. During his second visit, Sun said of the family:

I had a deep friendship with Mr. Torazō Miyazaki (Tōten) and the late Mr. Yazō Miyazaki, both of whom made great contributions to our country. If the people of Japan and China could maintain the same kind of friendship that I had with these two gentlemen, then even after thousands of years, we would be able to promote the cooperation and harmony between our two nations. I believe that this would demonstrate the future development and happiness of both countries. I deeply appreciate the village of Arao, which produced a righteous man like Mr. Miyazaki, who respected justice and humanity and worked not only for his own country but also for his neighboring nation. I also express my deep gratitude to the villagers of Arao. Here, I respectfully extend my regards to Mayor Hiraoka and all others involved."

Remnants of Miyazaki and Yat-sen's brushtalk conversations remain in the home, and the garden contains an old plum tree, cherished by Sun, as well as bodhi tree which Tōten planted after bringing it home from Siam (modern day Thailand), which he visited to try to find an entryway to China.

Their father, Chōzō Miyazaki, was generous with his personal wealth and used it to help the impoverished, even taking responsibility for dealing with the aftermath of local fires. However, by the end of his life, he had fallen into financial hardship. After losing his eldest son, Hachirō, in the Satsuma Rebellion, he strictly ordered his family, 'Do not eat from the hand of the government,' an order which all four of the brothers obeyed. Tamizō, who inherited Chōzō's fortune upon his death, evenly divided the ancestral land he had inherited among the brothers. They each sold off these lands to fund their social activities and support revolutionaries like Sun Yat-sen. As a result, their lives were marked by poverty. After Tamizō's death, debts remained, and the Miyazaki family estate was auctioned off.

=== After the brothers' death ===
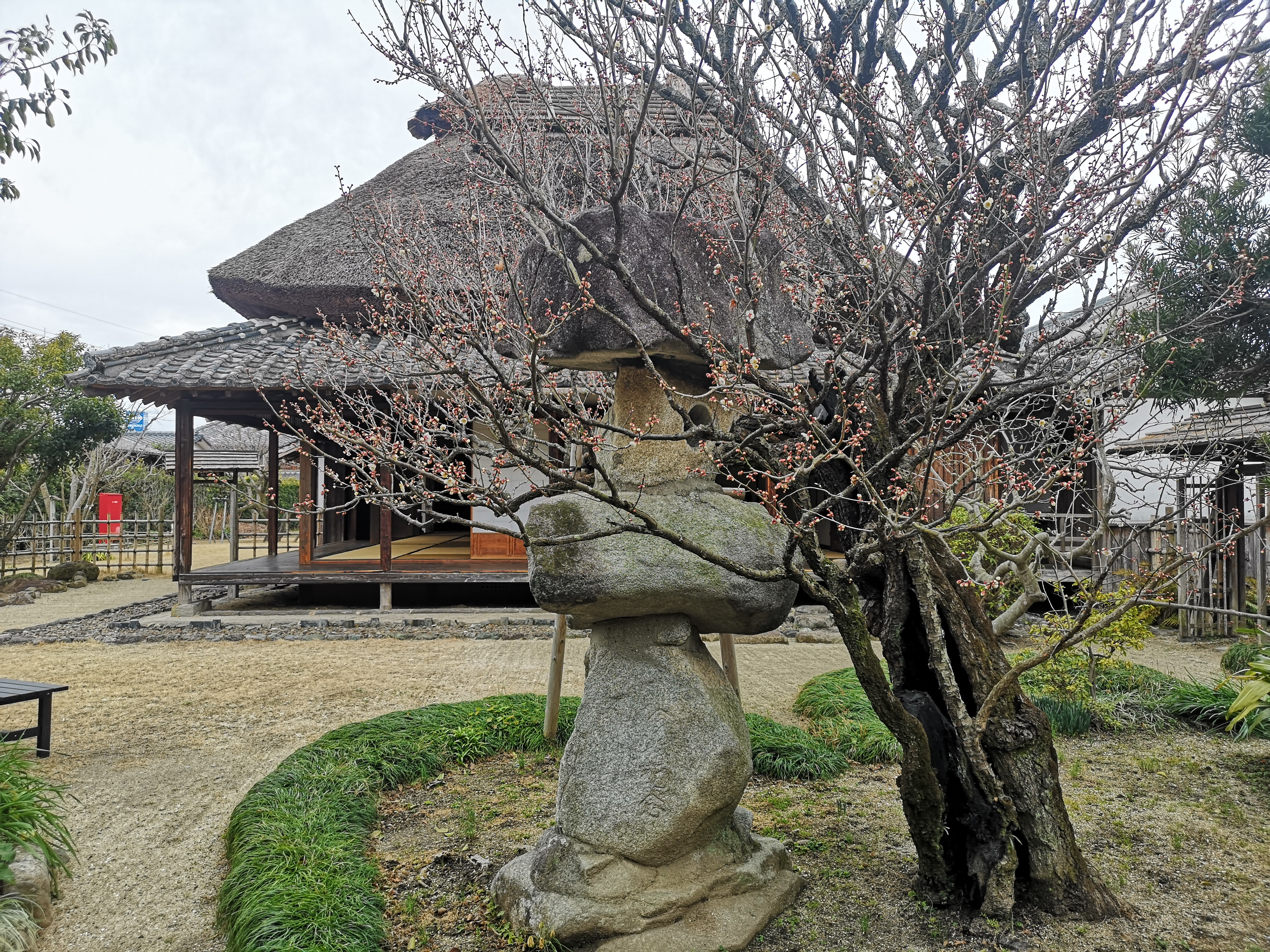
Miyazaki brothers home and garden (Plum Tree of Friendship)

After Tamizō's death in 1928, Jinbei Kawaguchi, who worked for the Miike Coal Mine company, purchased the house and became the new owner in 1931.

In 1965, the house was recognised as a significant cultural heritage site by Arao City. On 27 August 1973, it was further recognised as a significant historic site at the prefectural level by the Kumamoto Prefectural government. By this time, the property was owned by Shigeharu Kawaguchi, and the site was preserved jointly by the Kawaguchi family, the Arao City government, and Kumamoto Prefectural government.

In 1992, the city of Arao purchased the Miyazaki family home from the Kawaguchi family, before beginning the restoration of the Miyazaki brothers' birthplace and the construction of a museum. In June 1993, the Miyazaki brothers' family home and the Arao City Miyazaki Brothers Museum were opened to the public as facilities symbolizing the exchange between Arao City and countries in Asia, including China. The section that was added during the time the Kawaguchi family owned the property was removed to restore the building to its original state, and a new Miyazaki Brothers Museum was constructed as part of the 50th anniversary commemorative project of Arao City.

In 1995, the site won the "8th Kumamoto Scenic Award's Landscape Encouragement Prize". In 1996, it was selected by a people's vote of Kumamoto Prefecture residents as one of the "New 100 Views of Kumamoto."

In 2011, marking the 100th anniversary of the 1911 Revolution, there was a jump in visitors from China. This led to media coverage from China Central Television (CCTV), Hong Kong media, and other overseas outlets. Notable visits included an inspection by the Consul General of China in Fukuoka (in June), a visit by a delegation of the Hong Kong Chinese General Chamber of Commerce and other members of Hong Kong's financial world (in July), and an inspection and tour by the Japan-China Youth Calligraphy and Painting Exhibition delegation (also in July). The birthplace and museum of the Miyazaki brothers left a strong impression on Chinese visitors following the footsteps of Sun Yat-sen, showcasing the deep friendship between the Miyazaki brothers and Sun Yat-sen. It has become a place symbolizing friendship between Japan and China. In 2013, the Chinese Ambassador to Japan also visited and left behind a calligraphy inscription reading 'Jiwang Kailai' (继往开来, meaning 'carrying forward the work of our predecessors and opening up the future')."

The house's thatched roof was reroofed in 2015 as part of its continued maintenance.

== Exhibits ==
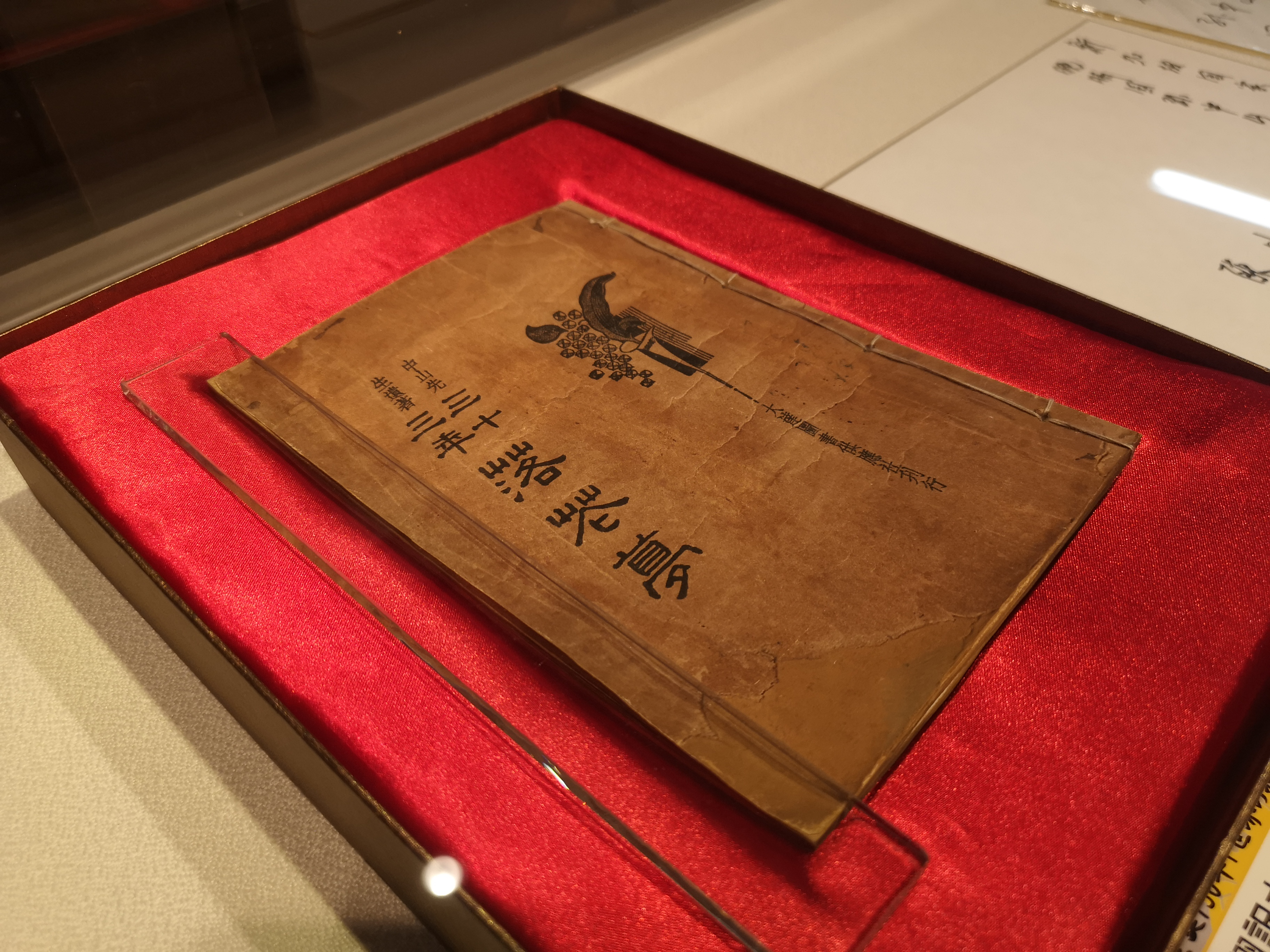
The Chinese edition of Miyazaki Tōten's book 'Testament of Sun Yat-sen: Thirty-Three Years, Falling Flower Dream.' This single volume brought Sun Yat-sen's existence to public attention and helped lead to the success of the revolution

The Miyazaki Brothers Museum houses approximately 440 artefacts, including documents, photographs, letters, and newspapers related to five individuals: Miyazaki Tōten, Miyazaki Hachirō, Miyazaki Tamizō, Miyazaki Yazō, and Sun Yat-sen.

- Universal Love and Benevolent Deeds 『博愛行仁』
  - This is a calligraphy plaque inscribed by Sun Yat-sen and addressed to Tamizō. The original is housed in the museum, and a replica is displayed at the birthplace.
- Tōten Miyazaki's book "My Thirty-Three Years' Dream"

== Facilities ==
- Miyazaki Brothers Museum
- Miyazaki Brothers Birthplace
- Miso and Soy Sauce Brewery
- "Plum Tree of Friendship" - An ume (plum) tree dated from 250 to 300 years old. The tree was planted by the ancestors of the Miyazaki's who transplanted it from the Dazaifu Tenmangū shrine in Fukuoka Prefecture. It is seen in the background of the commemorative photo taken during Sun Yat-sen's visit to the house in 1913.
- Bodhi Tree - Brought home from Siam and planted by Tōten Miyazaki.
- Paeonia - Brought home from China by Tōten Miyazaki. In 2014, Arao City gifted a sapling of the "Plum Tree of Friendship" to the Consulate General of the People's Republic of China in Fukuoka. In return, a peony gifted by the consul general was transplanted in 2015. At the Miyazaki Brothers Museum, a peony tea ceremony is held every April with the cooperation of local middle schools and the Japan-China Friendship Association.
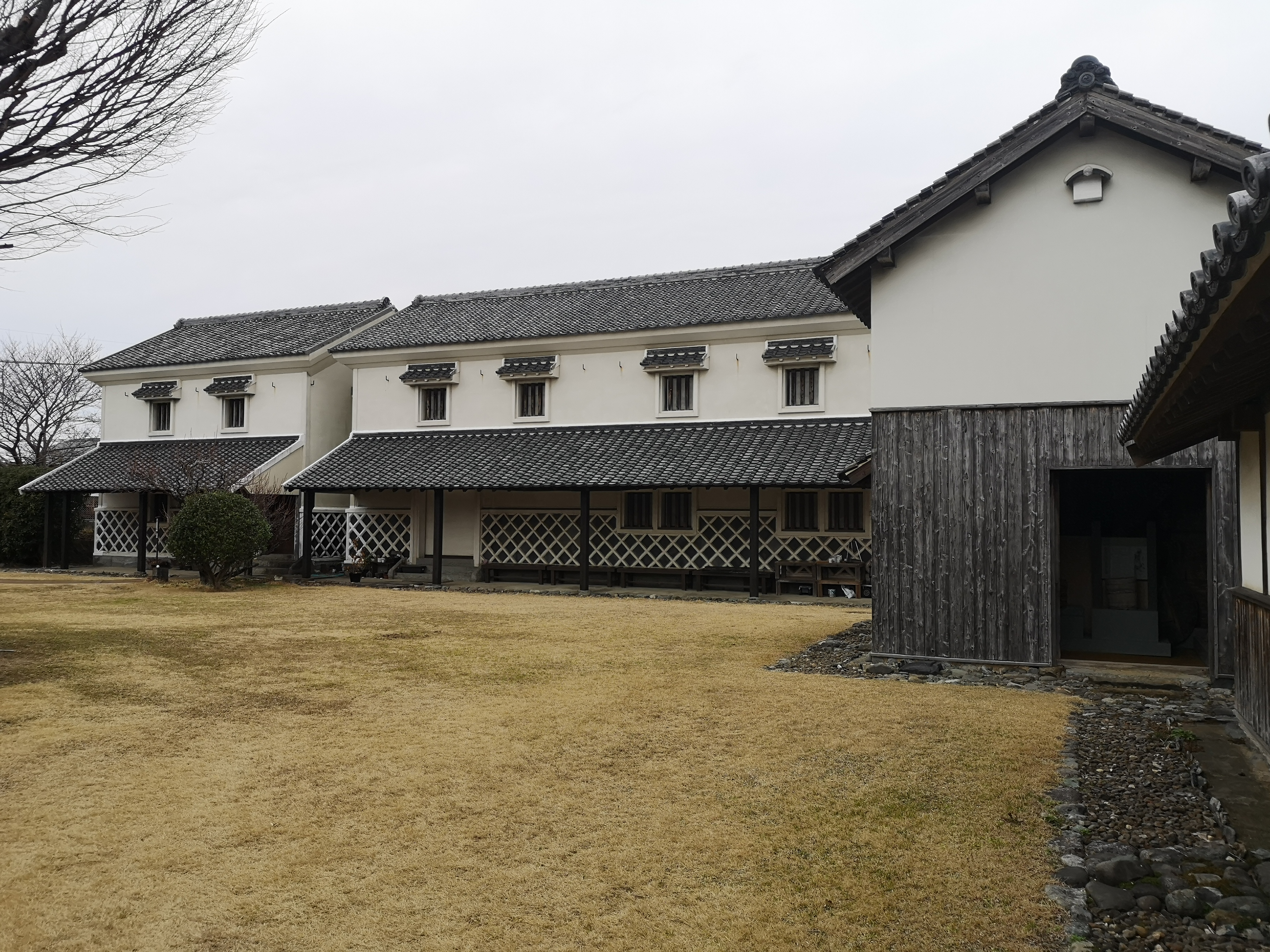
Miyazaki Brothers Museum

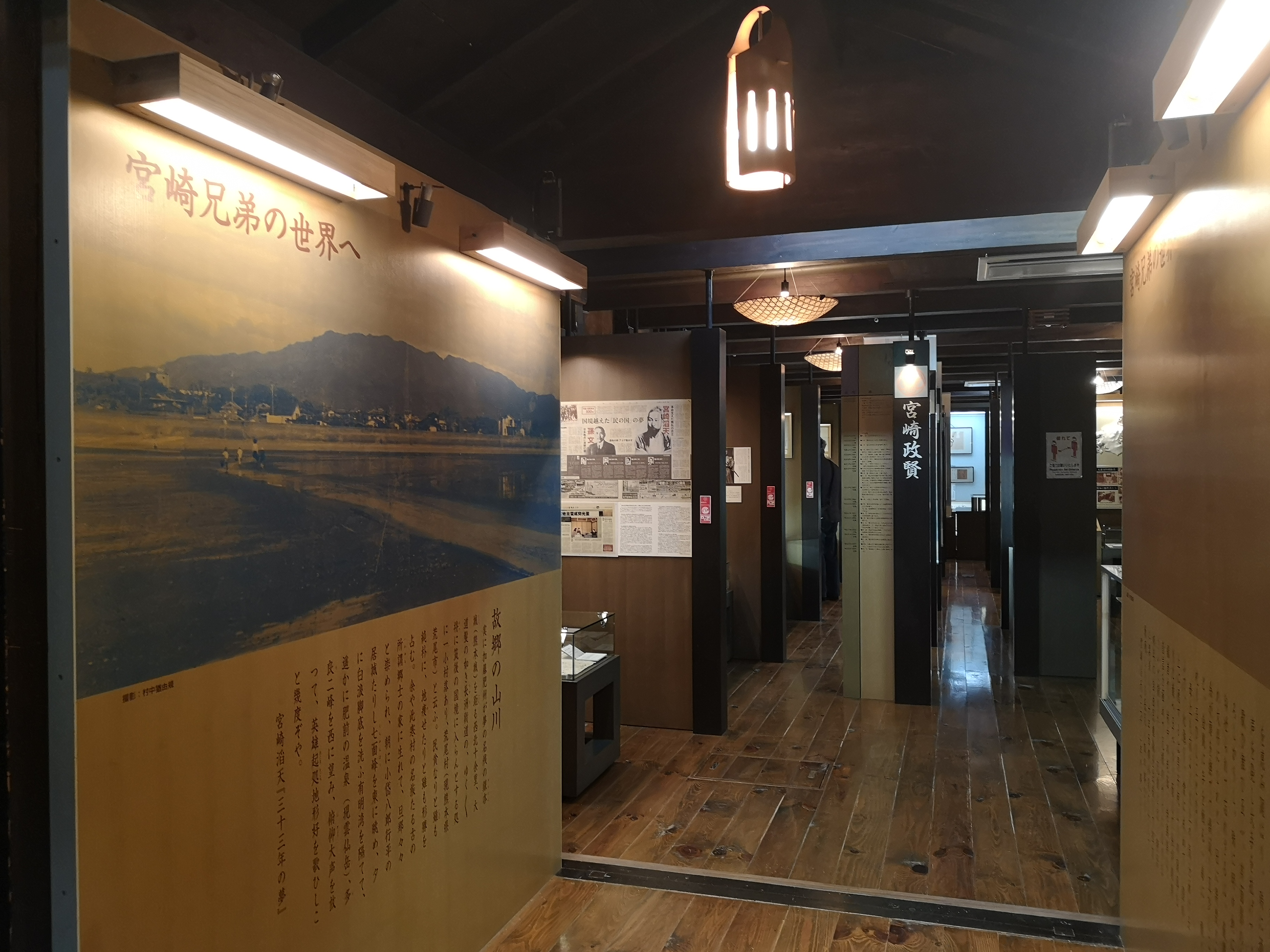
Exhibition in Miyazaki Brothers Museum

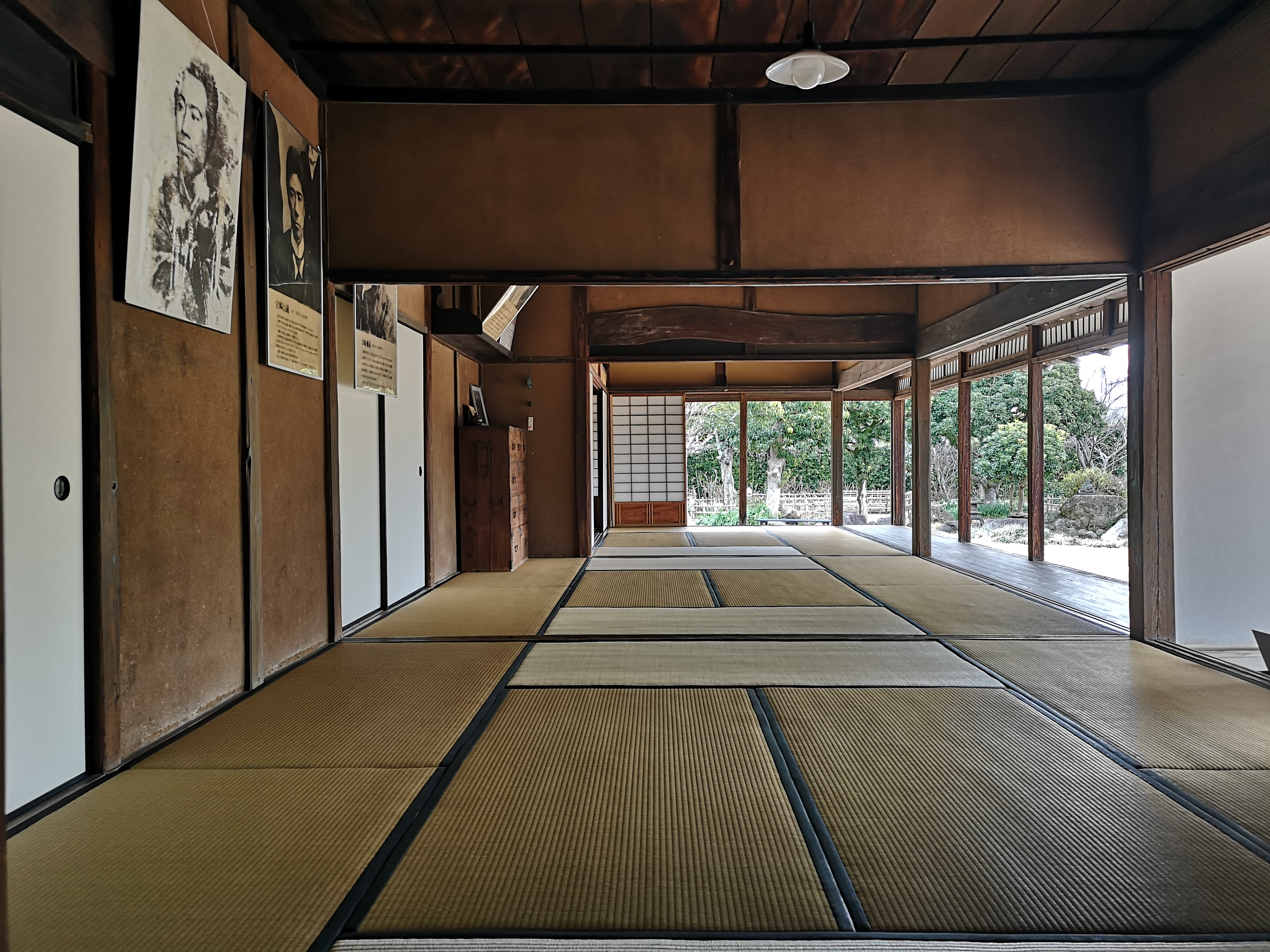
Birthplace exhibit

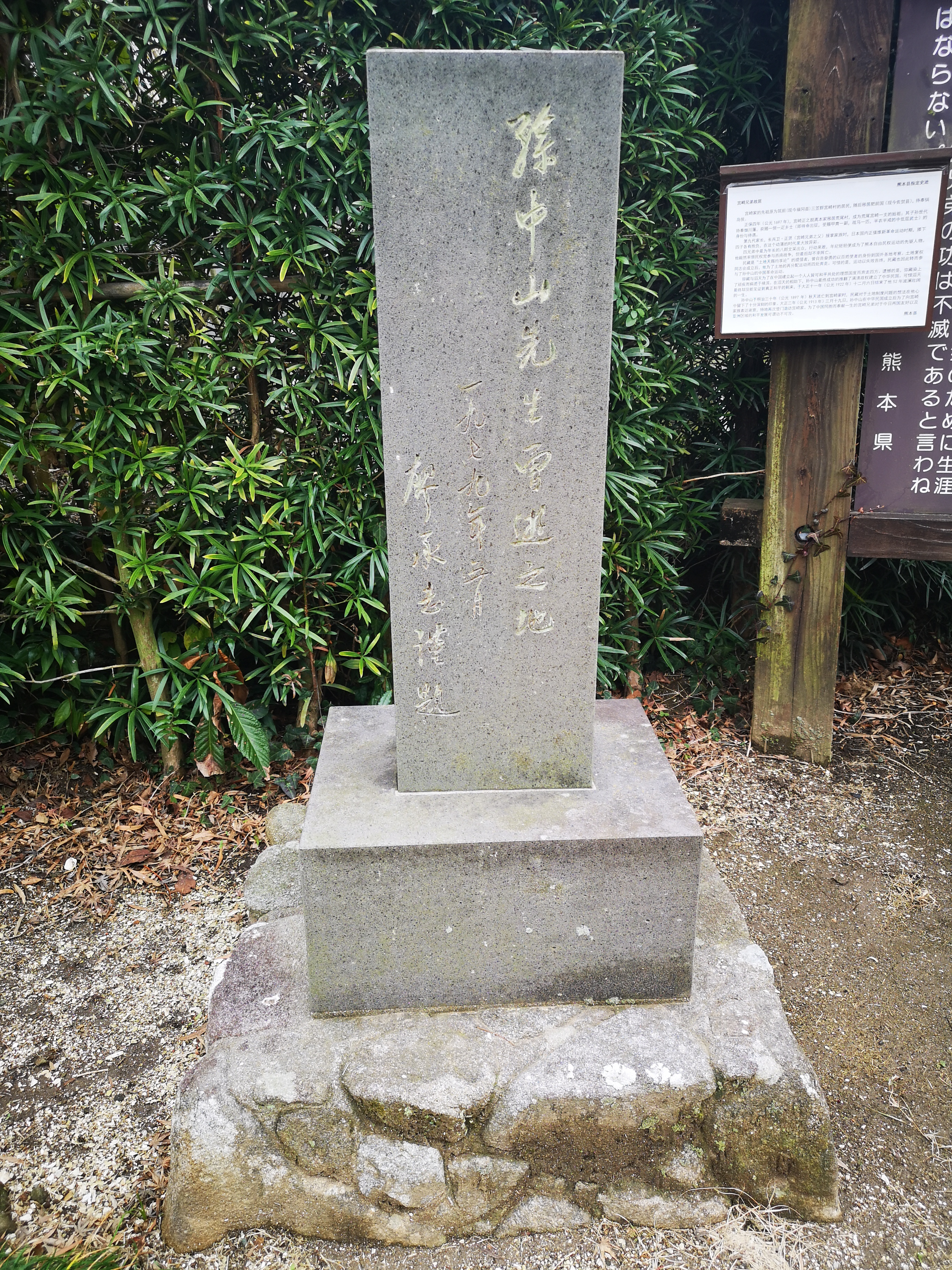
Monument commemorating Sun Yat-sen's visit

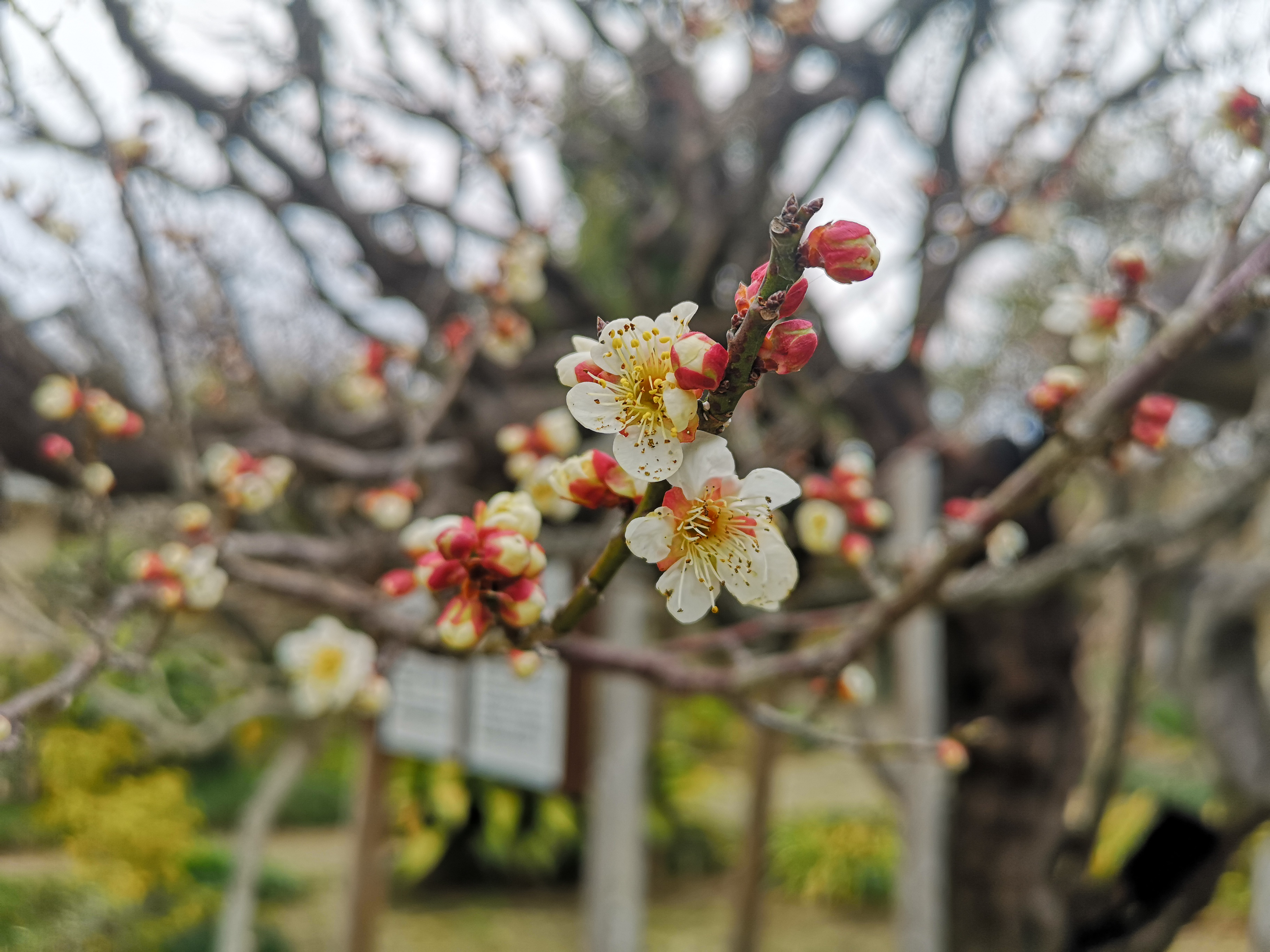
Plum Tree of Friendship

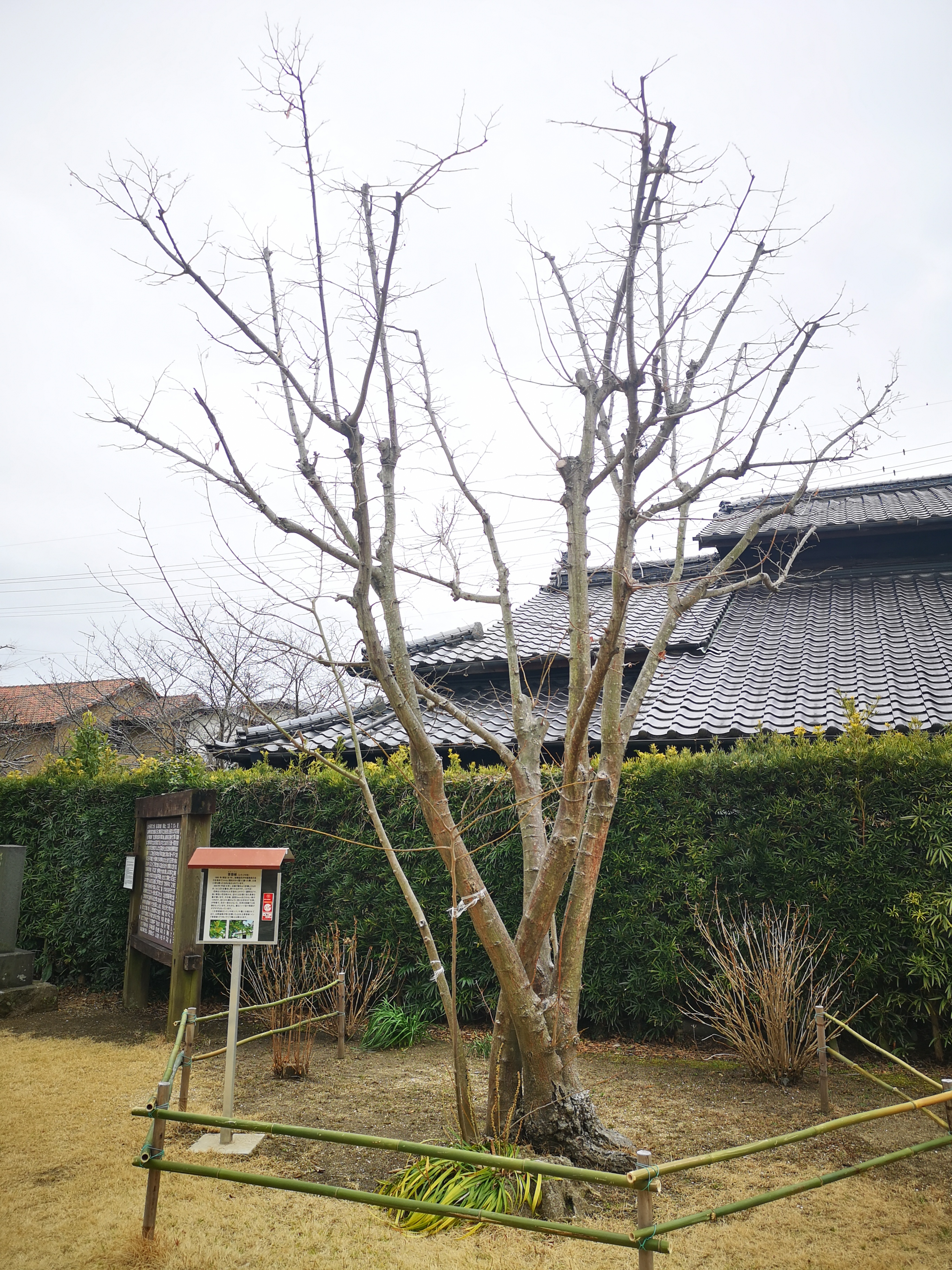
Bodhi tree (3rd generation)

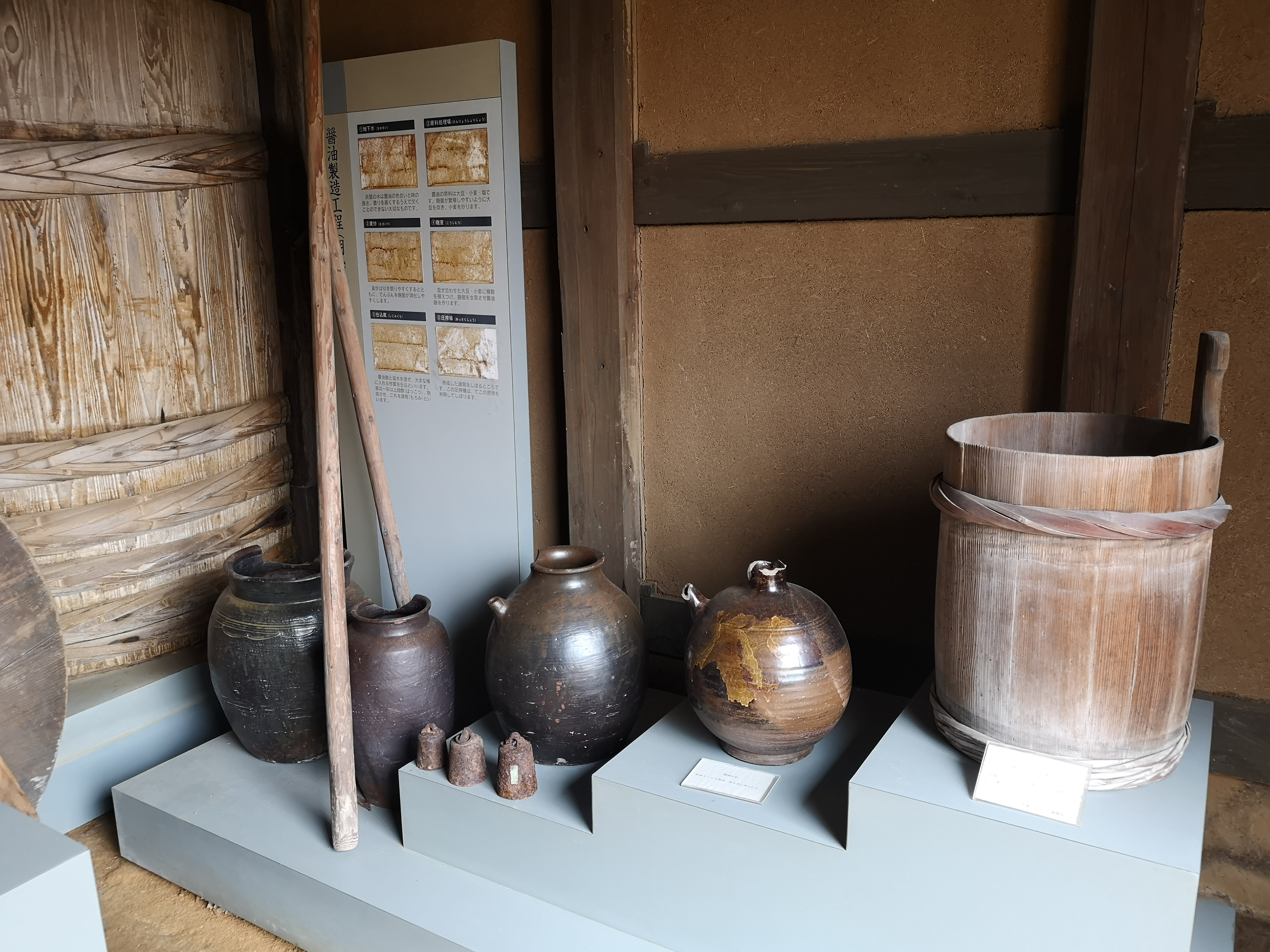
Exhibit of the miso and soy sauce brewery

== Miyazaki family members ==
=== Miyazaki family and Arao ===
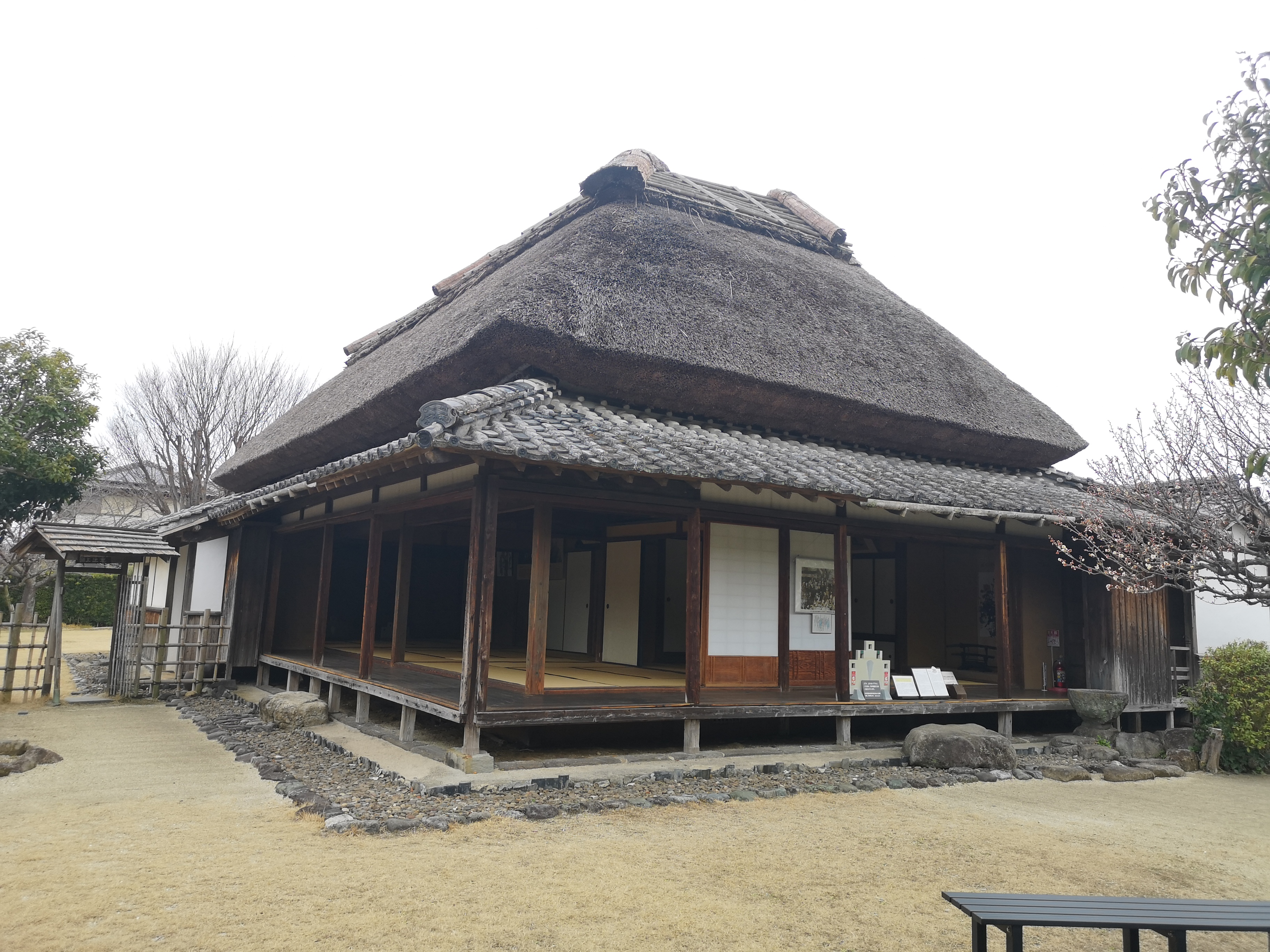
Birthplace of the Miyazaki Brothers

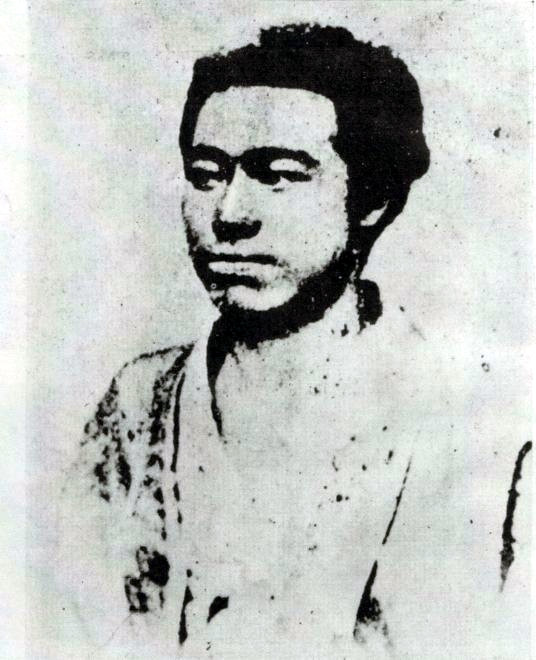
Hachirō Miyazaki

The Miyazaki family, whose distant ancestors are said to include Sugawara no Michizane, settled in Arao during the early Edo period. The family's origin is considered to have begun when the first-generation patriarch, Masayuki, married the daughter of Furusawa Yazaemon, the head of the Arao village. In 1667, after being appointed as a gōshi (lowest rank on the samurai hierarchy) for the Higo Province's Kumamoto Domain, he became responsible for tasks such as the inspection of the Shimabara Domain and collecting intel on the Hizen Province (located in modern-day Saga and Nagasaki prefectures). The family continued as hereditary gōshi in the Tamana District until the 8th patriarch Miyazaki Masaaki. By the time of 9th patriarch, Chōzō, the father of the Miyazaki brothers, the family were prominent landlords in Arao, owning the area from the Arao Tidal Flats to the area where the Greenland amusement park stands today. Chōzō valued education and excelled in the martial art Niten Ichi-ryū. As a landlord, he was known to treat people equally regardless of social class. This was an exceedingly rare attitude in Edo Japan. The revolutionary spirit of the Miyazaki brothers has been suggested to come from their father's egalitarian views.

Chōzō had a natural love for freedom and hoped that his later-born children would have the freedom to choose their own paths in life. To make his sons free to choose their own path, he adopted Takagi Gen'emon, the son of one of his kendo comrades, as the heir to his estate. However, since Gen'emon, who had other ambitions, ran away, Chōzō ultimately had one of his own children inherit the family estate.

=== The Miyazaki Brothers ===
The eldest of the four Miyazaki Brothers, Hachirō, became discontent with the autocratic leadership of the Meiji government after moving to Tokyo in 1870. This discontent, along with worries about the future of Japan as an independent nation, led him to become involved in the Freedom and People's Rights Movement. He became widely known at the time as a prominent advocate of anti-authoritarianism and popular sovereignty. He was inspired by Nakae Chōmin's "A Discourse by Rousseau on Social Contract", and established the Ueki School, promoting the ideas of the Freedom and People's Rights Movement. However, the school's teachings were considered too radical, and the prefecture ordered its closure after just six month. During the Satsuma Rebellion, he joined Saigō Takamori's forces, despite holding different ideological views from Saigō. It is said that he once remarked that he intended to let Saigō seize the country for a time, after which he would fight against him. However, Hachirō died in battle on 6 April 1877 at the age of 27.

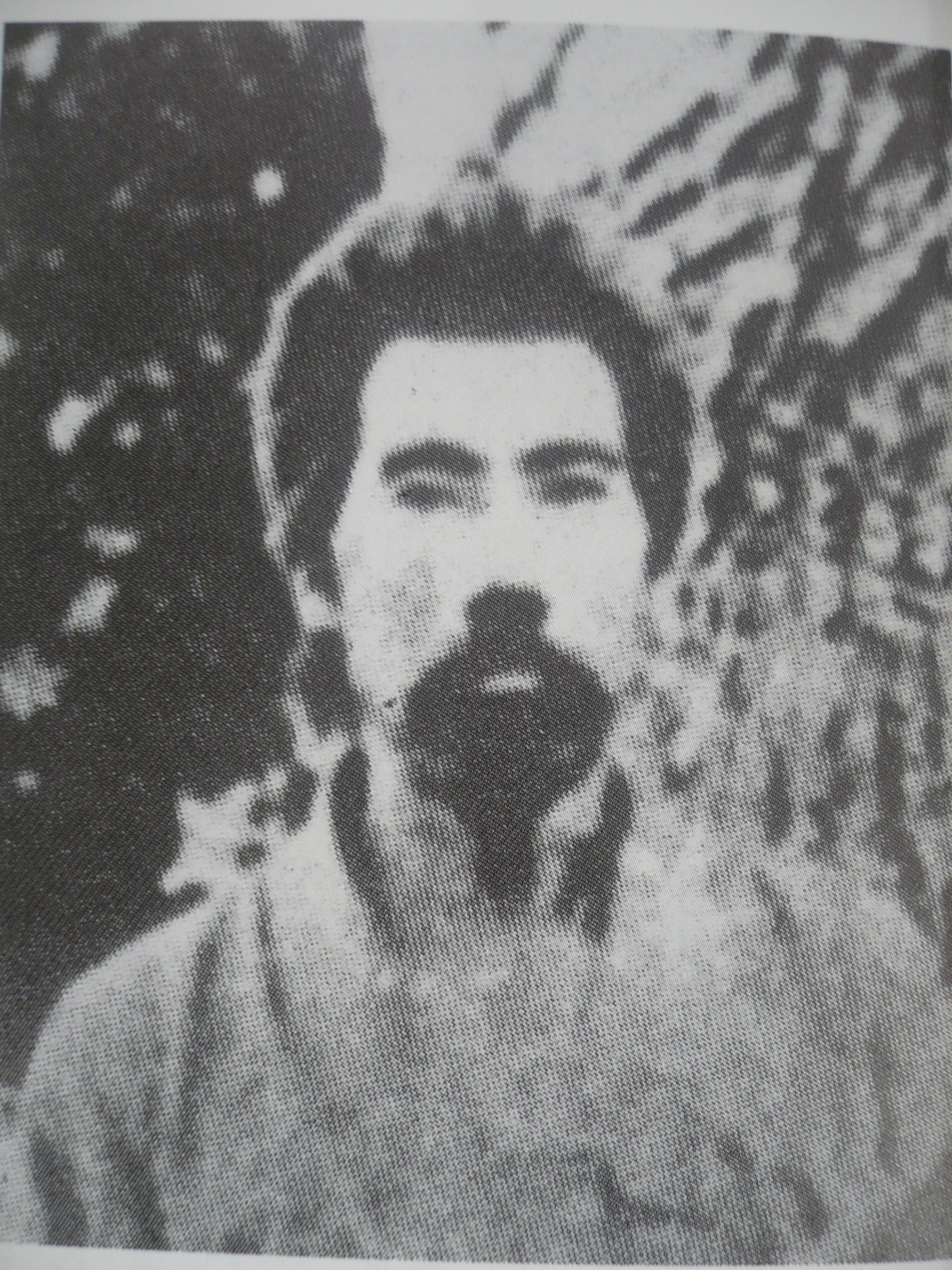
Tamizō Miyazaki

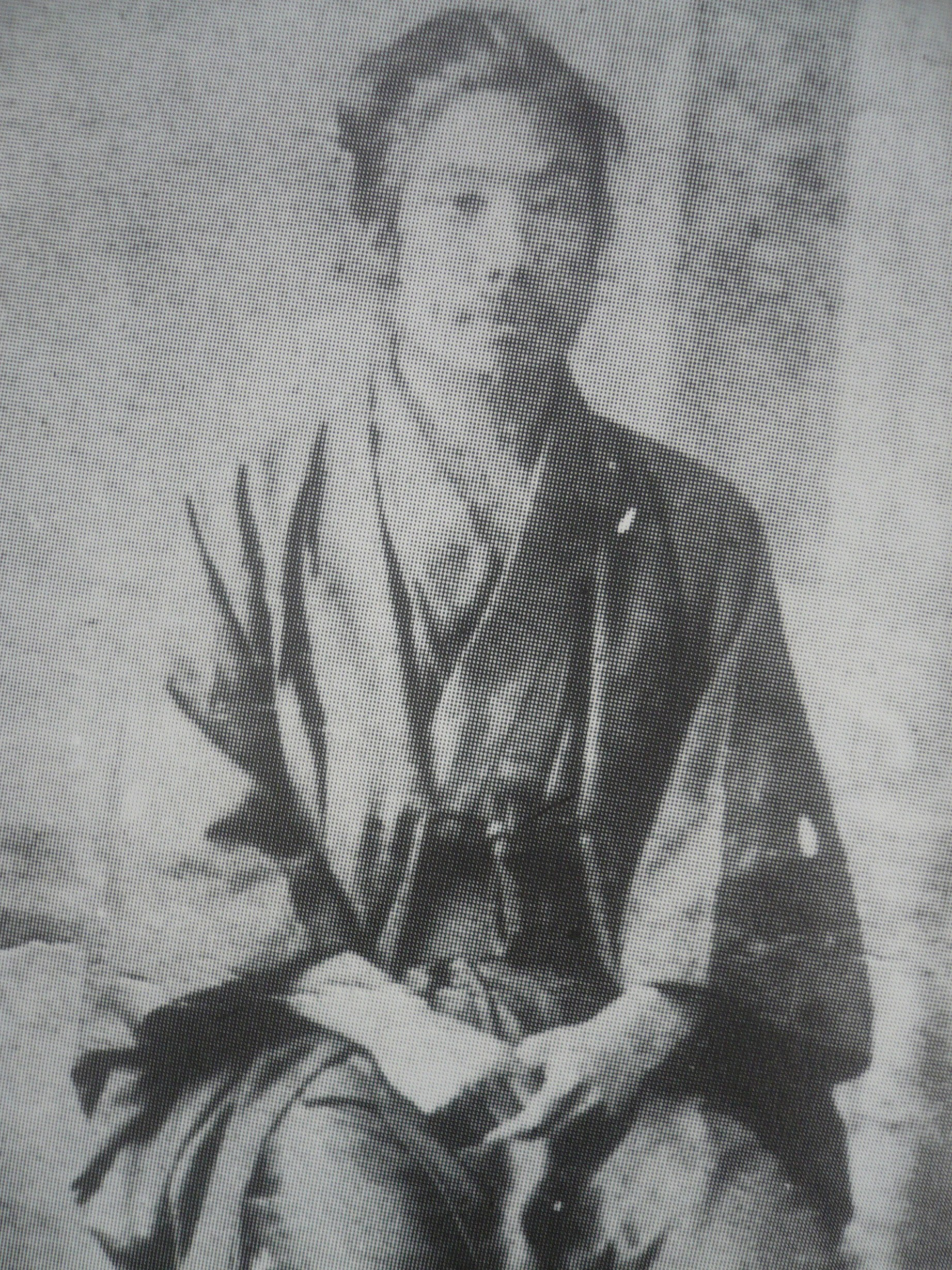
Yazō Miyazaki

Upon hearing the tragic news, Chōzō commanded his family, 'From now on, do not eat from the hand of the government.' The Miyazaki family fell into extreme financial hardship thereafter, but none of the brothers took government positions. Instead, they sold off their land and assets and devoted themselves to social causes. It was largely through Hachirō's popularity that the youngest brother, Tōten, could make contact with influential politicians such as Inukai Tsuyoshi, who would later become Prime Minister, allowing him to contribute to Sun Yat-sen's rebellion.

With the death of Hachirō, Tamizō, who inherited the family estate, came to the belief that land ownership is one of the fundamental human rights after seeing the impoverished conditions of the people in rural areas. In 1897, he traveled to Western countries for four years to study the land systems of advanced nations. During this time, he engaged in discussions with intellectuals such as the Russian writer Tolstoy, who advocated for absolute pacifism. After returning to Japan in 1902 with the mission of distributing land equally among the people, he established the Land Rights Restoration Society. However, in 1910, Tamizō, whose name was included in a "List of Japanese Socialists and Anarchists" compiled by the Home Ministry, had close relationships with socialist-anarchists like Kōtoku Shūsui and Matsuo Uitta, who were involved in the High Treason Incident plot to assassinate Emperor Meiji, and his house was searched as a result. Although Tamizō himself was studying in Korea at the time, his wife was questioned, and the land reform movement he was leading in Japan had to be suspended.

For this reason, Tamizō entrusted his dreams to Sun Yat-sen, who shared the ideology of "equal land rights," and supported his efforts by crossing over to the mainland to assist in the establishment of the Republic of China, the first republic in Asia, founded by Sun Yat-sen in 1912.

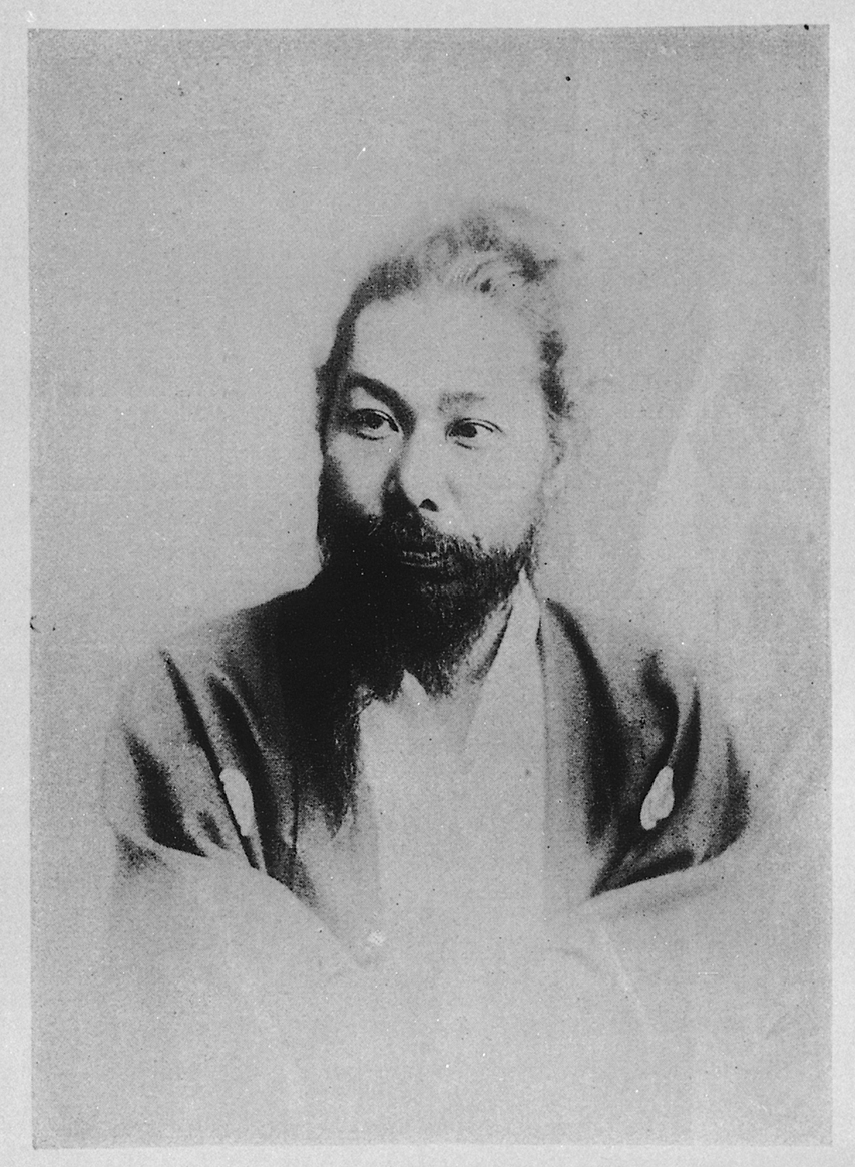
Tōten Miyazaki

Yazō, the third of the brothers, advocated a revolutionary form of Pan-Asianism rooted in the ideas of freedom and civil rights. He aimed for the solidarity of Asian peoples and the restoration of human rights, with the aspiration of initiating a revolution in China as a precursor to building an ideal nation. In order to become Chinese himself, he had his hair styled in a queue in Yokohama, took on the name Guan Zhongfu (管仲甫), and devoted himself to studying Chinese language and customs. One of the Chinese individuals Yazō met in Yokohama was Chan Siu-bak, a member of Sun Yat-sen's group. This encounter later led to his younger brother, Tōten, becoming connected with Sun Yat-sen. However, within the same year that Yazō met Chan, he died due to illness, and his passion for the 1911 Revolution was passed on to his younger brother, Tōten.

The youngest and most famous of the four Miyazaki brothers, Tōten, was born in 1871 as the eighth son of the Miyazaki family. He sympathized with the revolutionary Pan-Asianism advocated by his elder brother Yazō and shared the same ideals as Sun Yat-sen, whom he met. In the fall of 1897, after Sun Yat-sen's first uprising failed and he was in exile, Tōten invited him to the Miyazaki family home (the childhood home of the Miyazaki brothers, where Tamizō resided) and sheltered him for about two weeks. During this time, they communicated through English and brushtalk, fostering a deep friendship and passion for the revolution.

In 1902, Tōten introduced the then-unknown Sun Yat-sen in his autobiography "My Thirty-Three Years' Dream", which recounted the first half of his life. This single book left a deep impression on Chinese students studying in Japan, and after its Chinese translation was published, in July 1905, Sun Yat-sen joined forces with Huang Xing. This brought together Chinese revolutionaries who had previously held differing ideologies, and led to the formation of the Tongmenghui, a revolutionary alliance centered around Chinese students abroad. Tōten crossed over to China during the Xinhai Revolution to support his revolutionary comrades, and in 1913, after the success of the revolution, he welcomed Sun Yat-sen upon his arrival in Nagasaki. Tōten accompanied Sun on inspections throughout Japan, and their friendship continued until Tōten died from illness in 1922 at the age of 51.

Tamizō, the longest-lived of the four Miyazaki brothers, was away on a tour of Western countries in the fall of 1897 when his younger brother Tōten sheltered Sun Yat-sen at his home (the childhood home of the Miyazaki brothers). However, Tamizō's extensive collection of Western books on land reform issues deeply impressed Sun Yat-sen. When Sun Yat-sen left the Miyazaki home, he left a note promising to return the books and borrowed two trunks full of Tamizō's collection. After witnessing Sun Yat-sen's final moments, Tamizō continued to work on securing funds for the land reform movement. He died in an accident in Shanghai in 1928 at the age of 63.

=== Families of the brothers ===
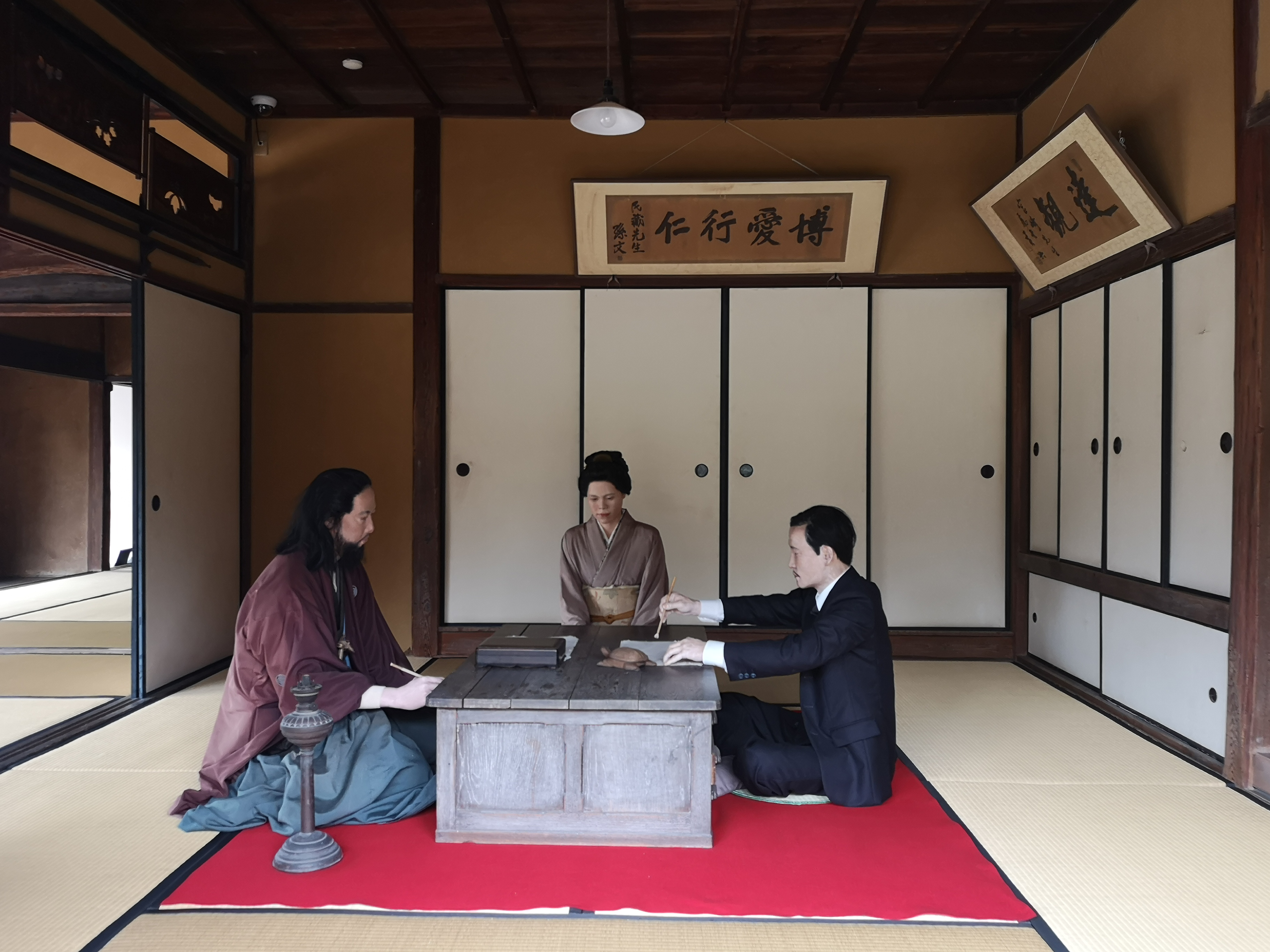
A wax figure reenacting the scene of Sun Yat-sen's first visit (1897), featuring Tōten, Tamizō's wife Mei, and Sun Yat-sen.

Tamizō's second son, Seimin, took over the role of a bridge fostering friendship between Japan and China, contributing to the Japan-China friendship movement. In the early 1950s, when diplomatic relations between Japan and China were severed, he played a key role in resolving the repatriation issue of 30,000 Japanese nationals in China and helped rescue over 1,000 fishermen who had been captured by the Chinese, ensuring their safe operations.

The Miyazaki brothers spent many days away from Arao for their revolutionary activities. Among them, Tōten, who had moved to Tokyo for the cause, expressed that while he could raise money for the revolution, he could not afford to support his family. As a result, he sold off all the land that his brother Tamizō had distributed to him as part of their inheritance to fund the revolution, leading to severe financial hardship for the family. However, his wife, Tsuchi, supported the household through side jobs and welcomed Chinese revolutionaries who came to their home. The Qing Dynasty was wary of the activities of Chinese revolutionaries like Sun Yat-sen in Japan. Under the orders of the Japanese government, which acted at the behest of the Qing Dynasty, the Miyazaki family was under surveillance by the Special Higher Police. However, some police officers, seeing the family's extreme poverty, took pity on them and would bring them tea. In 2022, the NHK program "Family History" introduced the police officer Toshikichi Kitamura, revealing that he was an ancestor of actors Kazuo Kitamura and Yukiya Kitamura, which generated considerable discussion.

Additionally, Tōten's eldest son, Ryūsuke Miyazaki, was married to Akiko Yanagiwara, who is known as the poet Byakuren Yanagiwara. Their marriage attracted significant attention when Akiko publicly announced her divorce from her former husband through a newspaper publication, a scandal which became known as the Byakuren Incident.

The Miyazaki Brothers Museum showcases not only materials related to the four brothers and the Chinese Xinhai Revolution but also the history of the Miyazaki family and its descendants, presented alongside the modern history of Arao City.

== Visitor information ==
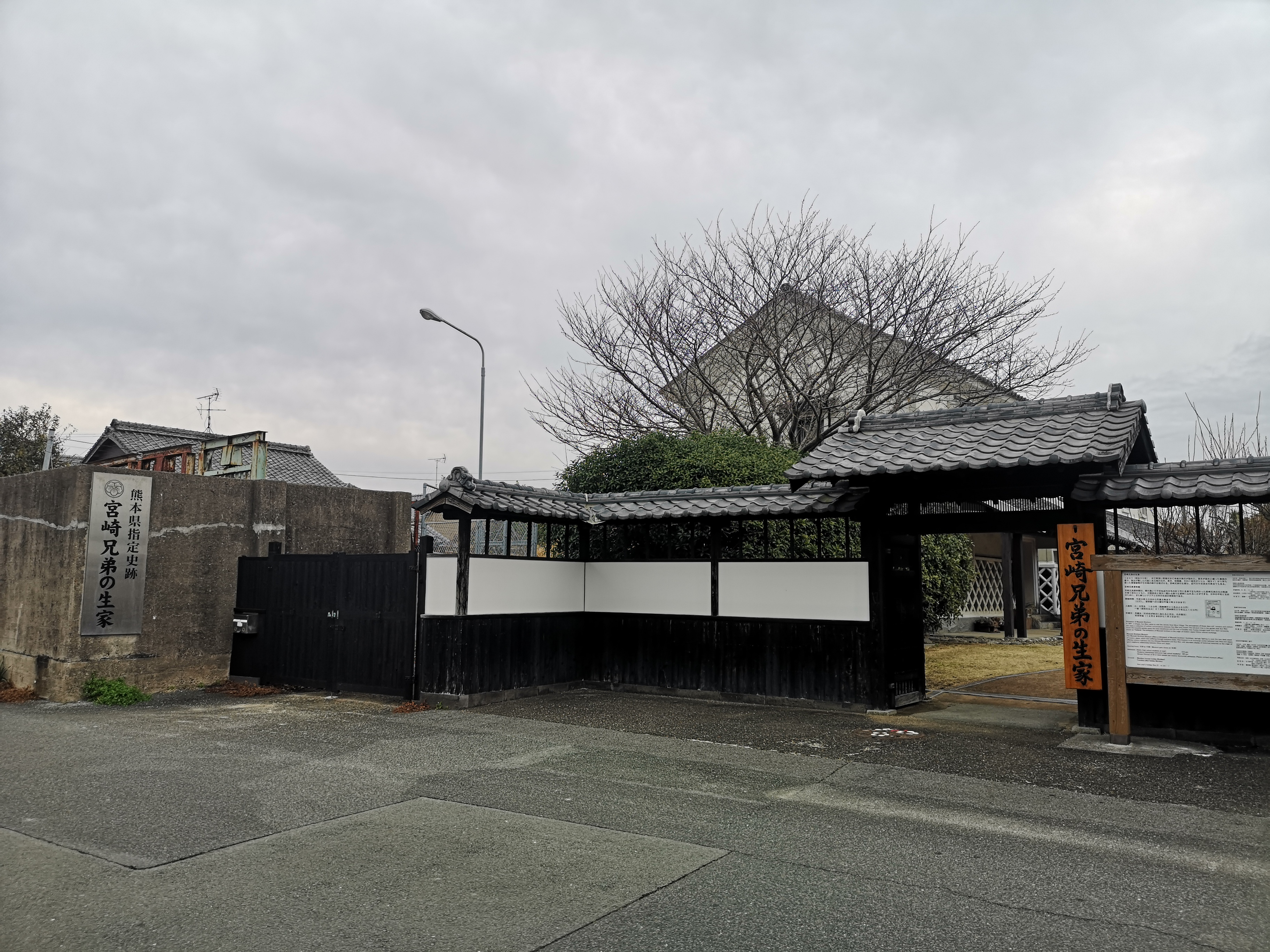
Exterior of the Miyazaki Brothers Birthplace & Museum

- Location
  - Arao 949–1, Arao City, Kumamoto Prefecture
- Opening Hours
  - 9:30 AM to 5:00 PM (Last admission at 4:30 PM)
  - The Miyazaki brothers' family home and garden are free to visit.
  - The Miyazaki Brothers Museum charges an entrance fee:
    - Elementary and middle school students: 100 yen
    - General admission: 210 yen
- Days of Closure
  - Mondays, Days following National Holidays, New Years (Dec 28-Jan 4)
- Access
  - 15 Minute walk from Arao Station on the JR Kagoshima Main Line

== Sources ==
- 荒尾市教育委員会『宮崎兄弟の生家整備工事報告書』(in Japanese) 荒尾市、1993年
- 野田真衣 『宮崎兄弟と孫文と辛亥革命』(in Japanese) 荒尾市、2019年
- 『荒尾の文化遺産 荒尾市史別編』(in Japanese) 荒尾市、2003年
- 『日本からシンガポールへ 宮崎兄弟と孫文と辛亥革命』(in Japanese) 荒尾市、2019年
- 『夢翔ける 宮崎兄弟の世界へ』(in Japanese) 熊本文化出版会館、1995年
