= Marius B. Jansen =

American historian (1922–2000)

Marius Berthus Jansen (April 11, 1922 – December 10, 2000) was an American academic, historian, and emeritus Professor of Japanese History at Princeton University.

== Biography ==
Jansen was born in Vleuten in the Netherlands to Gerarda and Bartus Jansen, a florist who moved his family to Johnston, Rhode Island in the fall of 1923. Jansen grew up in Massachusetts and graduated from Princeton in 1943, having majored in European history of the Renaissance and Reformation. The same year, he began serving in the Army, studying Japanese and working in the Occupation of Japan. He completed his PhD in history at Harvard in 1950, studying Japan with Edwin O. Reischauer and China with John K. Fairbank. His dissertation dealt with the interactions of the two countries and was published as The Japanese and Sun Yat Sen in 1954.

He was a member of the Council on Foreign Relations and of the American Academy of Arts and Sciences and president of the Association for Asian Studies in 1976. In 1999, Jansen was the first foreigner to be honored with the Distinguished Cultural Merit Award, given by the government of Japan.

== Selected works ==
In a statistical overview derived from writings by and about Marius Jansen, OCLC/WorldCat encompasses roughly 100+ works in 300+ publications in 12 languages and 13,900+ library holdings.

- The Japanese and Sun Yat-sen (1954)
- Sakamoto Ryōma and the Meiji Restoration (1961)
- Japan and Communist China in the Next Decade (1964)
- Changing Japanese Attitudes Toward Modernization (1965)
- Studies in the institutional history of early modern Japan (1968) John Whitney Hall and Marius Jansen, eds. Princeton, Princeton University Press.
- Japan and its World: Two Centuries of Change (1975)
- Japan and China: from War to Peace, 1894–1972 (1975)
- Japan in Transition, from Tokugawa to Meiji (1986)
- China in the Tokugawa World (1992 ISBN 978-0-674-18476-3) ; DeGruyter 2014) The 1988 Edwin O. Reischauer Lectures
- Japanese Today: Change and Continuity (1995) Edwin O. Reischauer, Marius B. Jansen
- The Making of Modern Japan (2000)

Translations:

- My Thirty-Three Years' Dream by Miyazaki Tōten

== Honors ==
- Guggenheim Fellowship, 1979.
- Order of the Sacred Treasure, 1985.
- Japan Academy, 1999
- Person of Cultural Merit, 1999.

== See also ==
- Sakamoto Ryōma
