= Arao-higata =

Tidal flat in Arao, Kumamoto, Japan

- 荒尾干潟
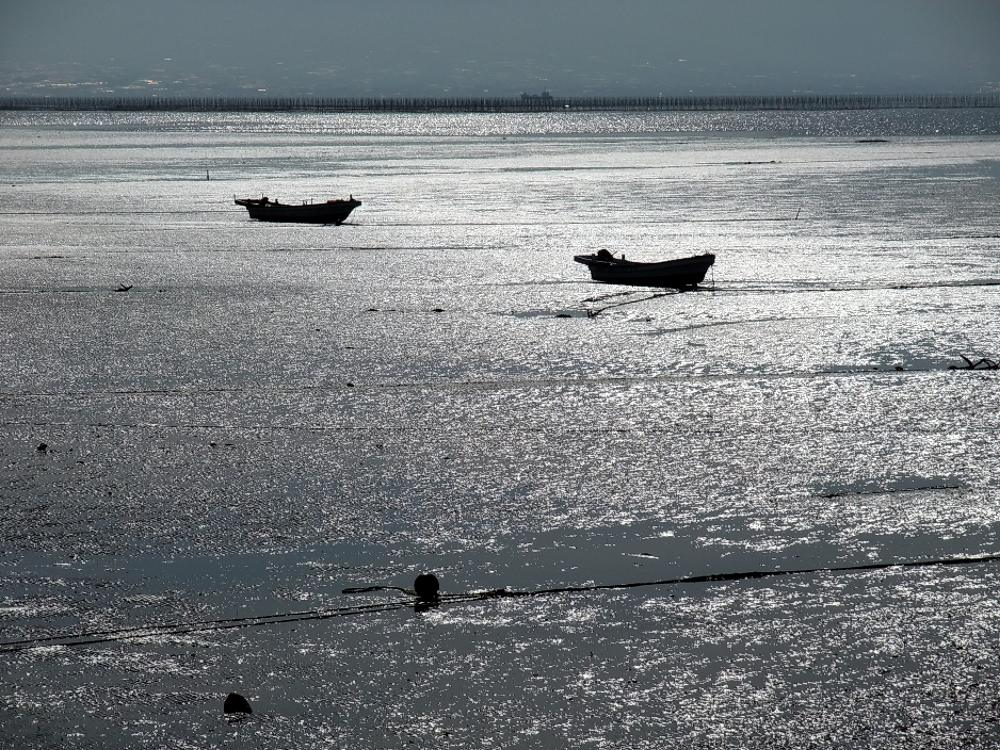

- Location within Japan
- Location: Japan; Arao, Kumamoto Prefecture
- Coordinates: 32°58′55″N 130°25′51″E
- Area: 7.54 km^{2} (2.91 sq mi)
- Established: 2012
- Governing body: Arao City Government
Designations
Ramsar Wetland
- Official name: Arao-Higata
- Designated: 3 July 2012
- Reference no.: 2054

Arao Higata (荒尾干潟) is a Ramsar Convention designated tidal flat in Arao, Kumamoto.

== Summary ==
The eastern shore of the Ariake Sea contains mudflats of maximum width 3.2 km, length of 9.1 km and area of around 1656ha, making up 40% of the total tidal flat area of Japan. The Arao Higata, which makes up part of this tidal flat, has no major river flowing into it, but is made up of sand deposited by tidal currents which has piled up to create a shoal. The area is relatively less muddy, and has more sand and shells, than other tidal flat areas on the Ariake Sea. As a result, unlike many other mudflats, it can be walked on normally. The area is inhabited by many types of polychaete, mollusca, and small crustaceans. The flat is also a stopping point and wintering spot for migratory birds such as sandpipers and plovers, as well as the black-faced spoonbill. The higata has also long been used for varied aquaculture including seaweed cultivation and manila clam farming.

The "Arao Second Swimming Area" here was once a popular swimming destination, leading to the construction of the Minami Arao Station for easier access. However, due to the deterioration of local water quality during Japan's economic miracle, the swimming area was shut down. The quality of the water is steadily improving.

2.6 km of pine trees line the coast of the Arao Higata. A "Majaku fishing competition" is held by the Arao City municipal government each summer.

The area is designated a national protected wildlife sanctuary by Japanese Ministry of the Environment. In July 2012, it was also registered to the Ramsar Convention, as it supports over 0.1% of the world's black-faced spoonbills and regularly supports over 1% of the world's Saunders's gulls.

The Arao-higata Waterfowl and Wetland Centre, an educational institution run by the local government, opened on 10 August 2019.

== Organisms of the Arao Higata ==
=== Bird species ===
The mudflat is a notable hub for migratory birds. Species of sandpiper use the area as a stopover from autumn to spring. In the autumn, commonly observed species include the kentish plover, grey-tailed tattler, grey plover, red-necked stint, terek sandpiper, and siberian sand plover. Dunlins and kentish plover are common in the winter. In the spring, bar-tailed godwits, grey-tailed tattlers, and grey plovers populate the mudflat. As the kentish plover is the only species which reproduces in Arao City, it has been chosen as the official bird of the city.

In a shorebird survey run by the Ministry of the Environment in 2008, 6492 shorebirds were recorded along the Arao coast, the 2nd highest of any area in the country.

The area is also an important area for rare migratory birds on the IUCN Red List such as the endangered (EN) black-faced spoonbill, and vunerable (VU) species such as the common shellduck and saunders's gull.

=== Benthic animals ===
Surrounding rivers bring organic-rich sediment to the tidal flat, where it mixes with seawater through repeated exposure and submersion. This nutrient-rich water supports seagrass, plankton, and bottom-dwelling creatures like worms and shellfish, which in turn feed shorebirds. These natural processes help maintain the tidal flats and improve water quality.

- Japanese mudshrimp - Known locally as "Majaku" in the Ariake sea, they are a local specialty of Arao.
- Pen shell - Becoming considerably rarer on the Ariake sea due to changes in the environment
- Various crabs
- Various molluscs

== Preservation measures ==
=== Private initiatives ===
In recent years, due to decreasing fishing hauls caused by incidences of red tides and reductions in minerals, there has been efforts to restore the quality of the tidal flat led by the local fishing industry.

=== Municipal government initiatives ===
"Arao Higata Day" is celebrated on 3 July each year to commemorate designation from the Ramsar Convention. The occasion is used to bring awareness to the ecological importance of the area and highlight conservation activities.

=== Prefectural government initiatives ===
Kumamoto Prefecture celebrates "Kumamoto: everyone's rivers and seas day" each August to support the movement to the restoration of the Ariake Sea and Yatsushiro Sea. The prefecture, municipal governments, fishing cooperatives, businesses and residents work to clean up the seas and rivers of Kumamoto.

== Location and access ==
- Location: Masunaga・Ichibu・Kuramitsu areas in Arao City, Kumamoto Prefecture
  - The Waterfowl and Wetland Centre is located at 20-1 Kuramitsu, Arao, Kumamoto
- Walking distance from Minami-Arao Station, on the JR Kyushu Kagoshima Main Line
- Access by car from the Kyushu Expressway Nankan Interchange via the Kumamoto Prefectural Road 29 and Japan National Route 389, taking approx. 36 minutes (18 km)

== See also ==
- Mudflat
- Ramsar Convention
- Ariake Sea
