= Arao, Kumamoto =

Arao 荒尾市
- City
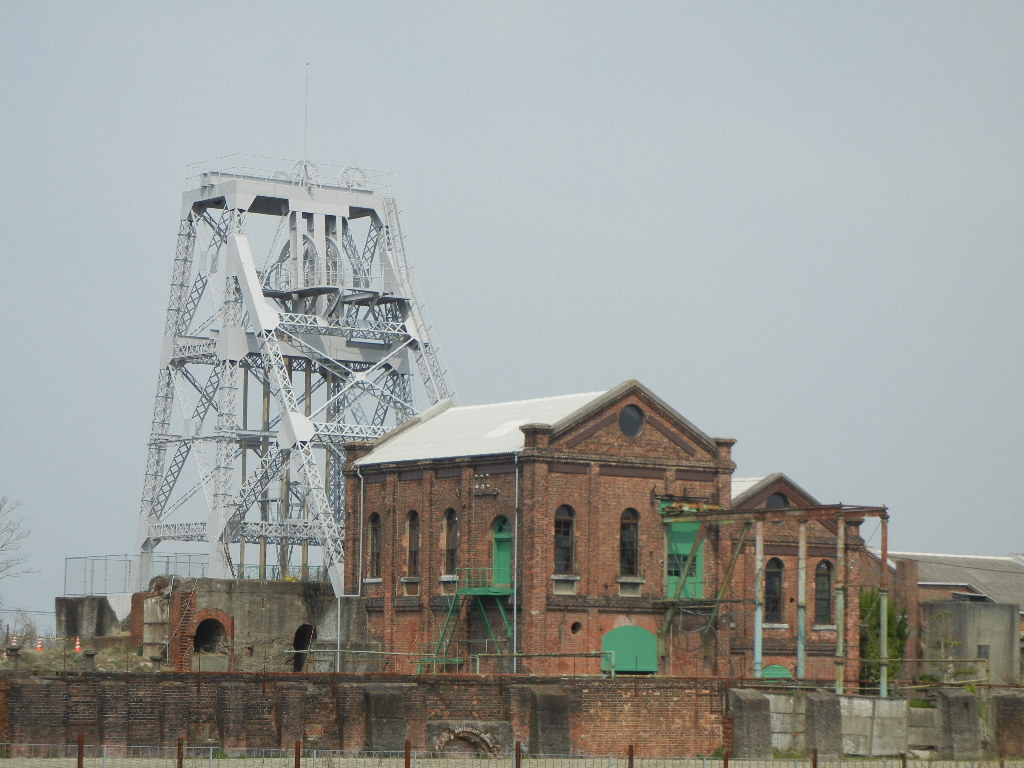

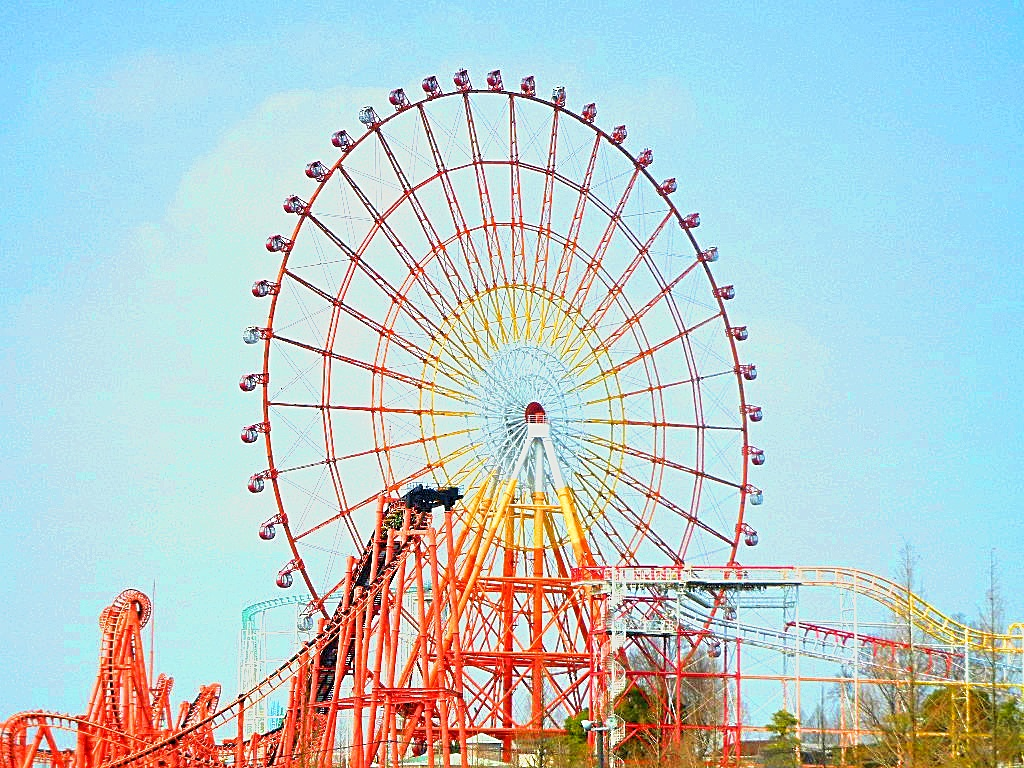

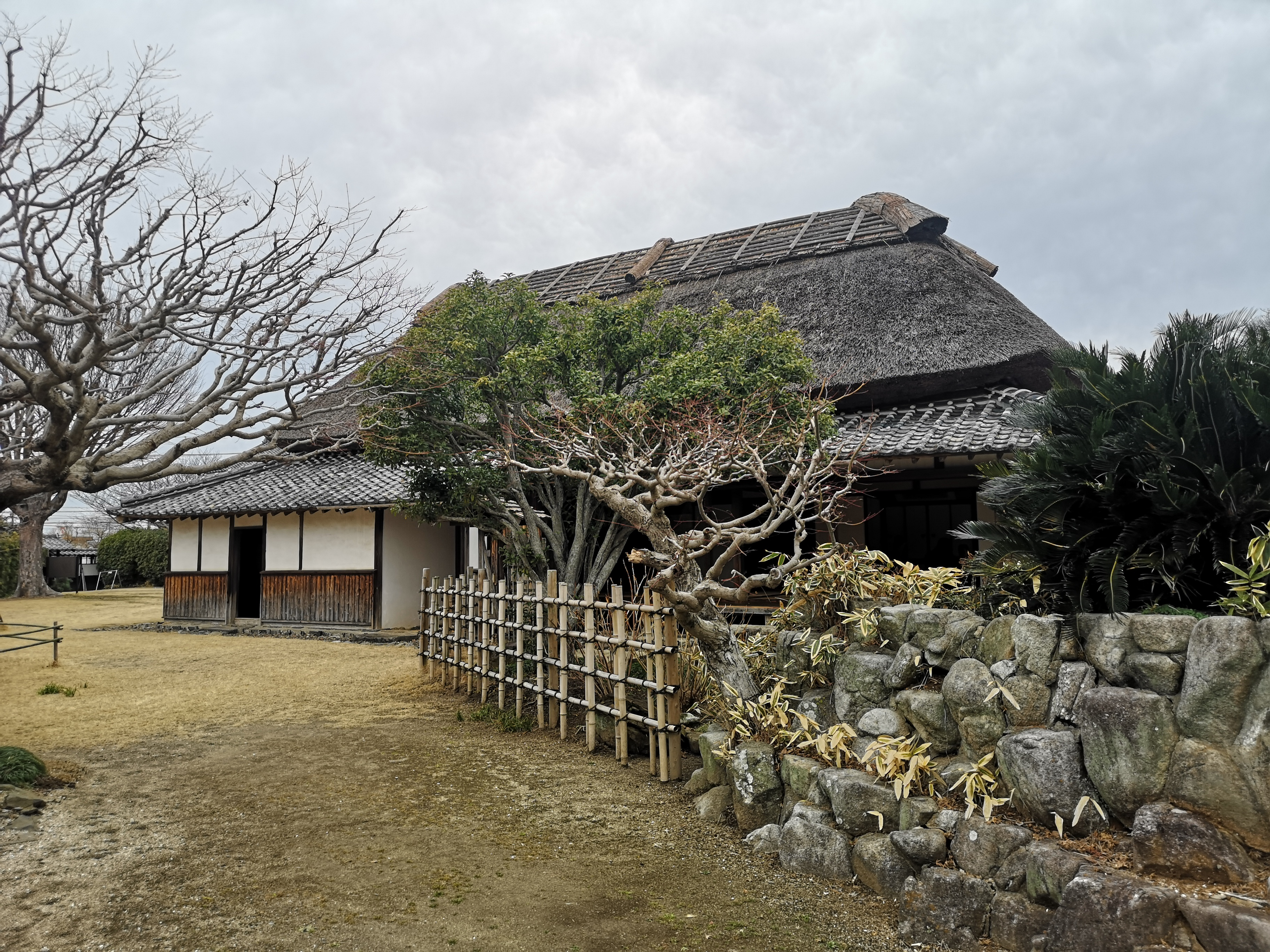

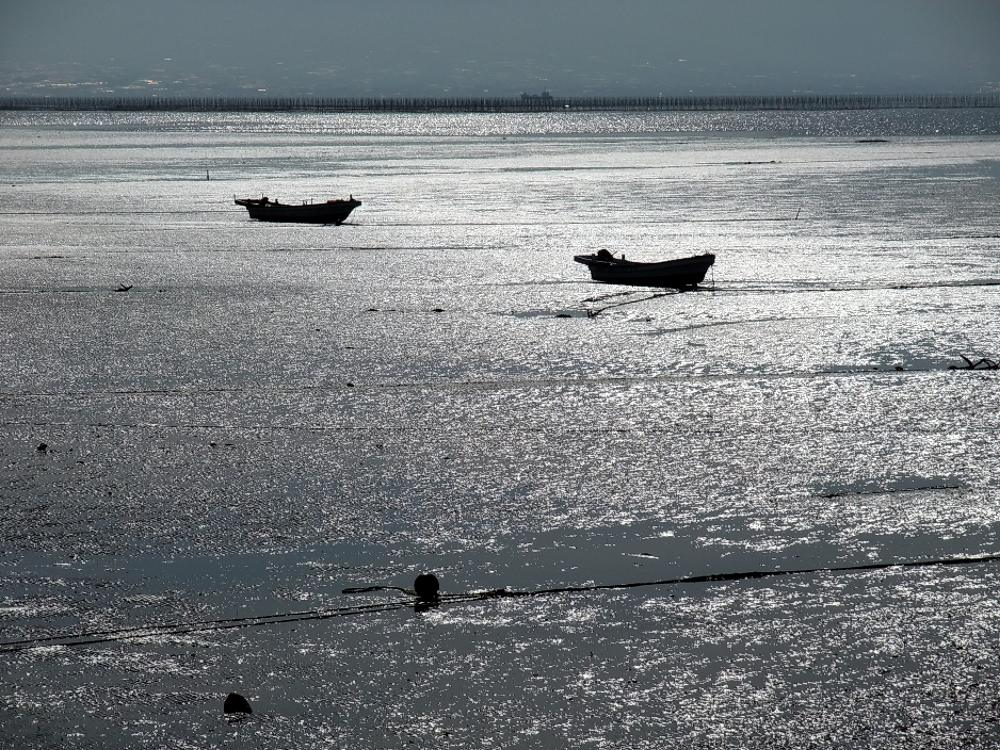
Mitsui Miike Coal Mine	Greenland Amusement Park
Birthplace of the Miyazaki Brothers	Arao Tidal Flat
- Flag Emblem
- Interactive map of Arao
- Location in Japan
- Coordinates: 32°59′12″N 130°25′59″E
- Country: Japan
- Region: Kyushu
- Prefecture: Kumamoto

Government
  - Mayor: Asada Toshihiko

Area
  - Total: 57.37 km^{2} (22.15 sq mi)

Population (July 31, 2024)
  - Total: 49,334
  - Density: 859.9/km^{2} (2,227/sq mi)
- Time zone: UTC+09:00 (JST)
- City hall address: 390 Kunai-Deme, Arao-shi, Kumamoto-ken 864-8686
- Website: Official website
- Symbols
- Bird: Kentish plover
- Fish: Japanese mud shrimp
- Flower: Pyraspyrifolia
- Tree: Pine

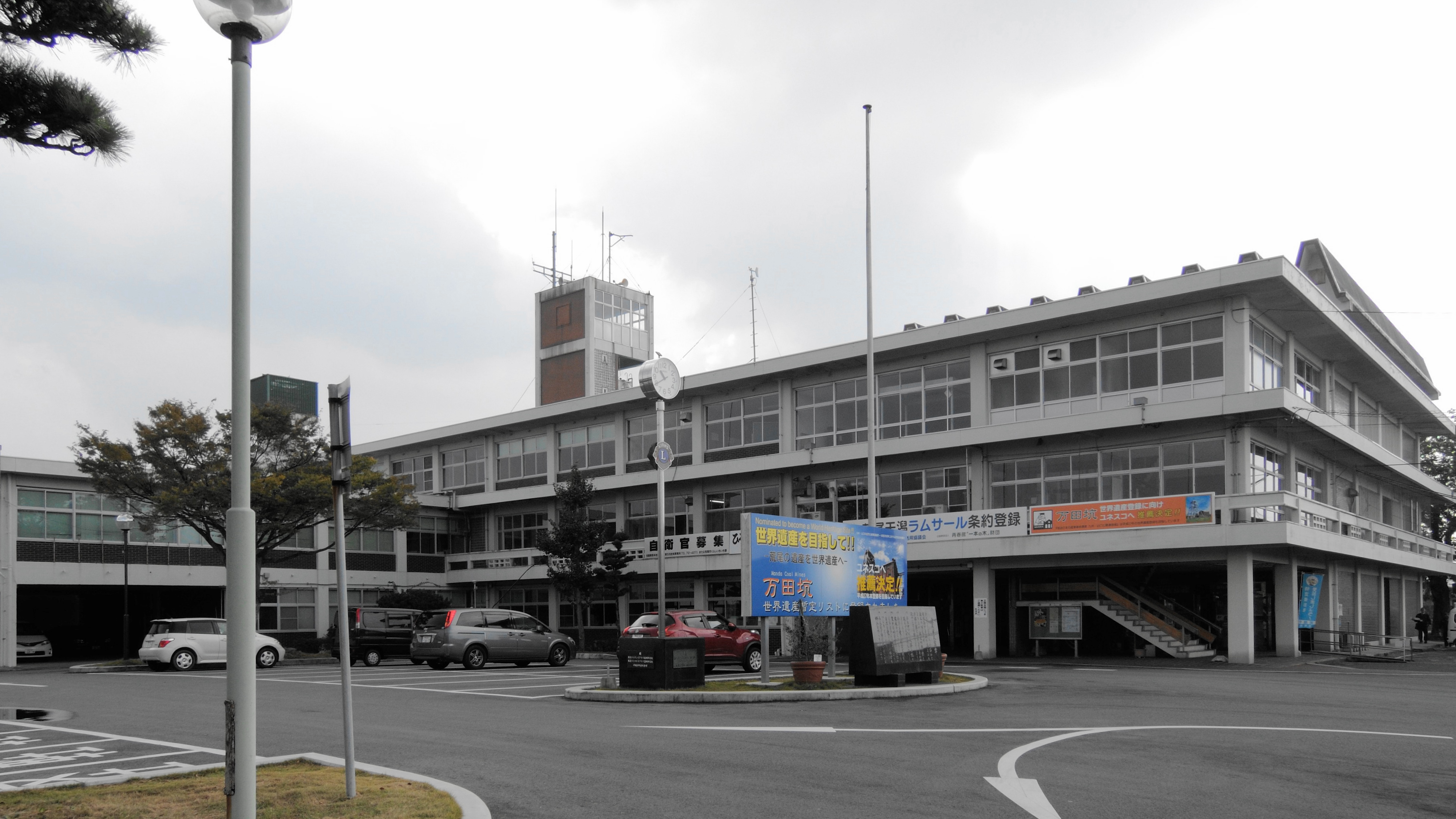
Arao City Hall

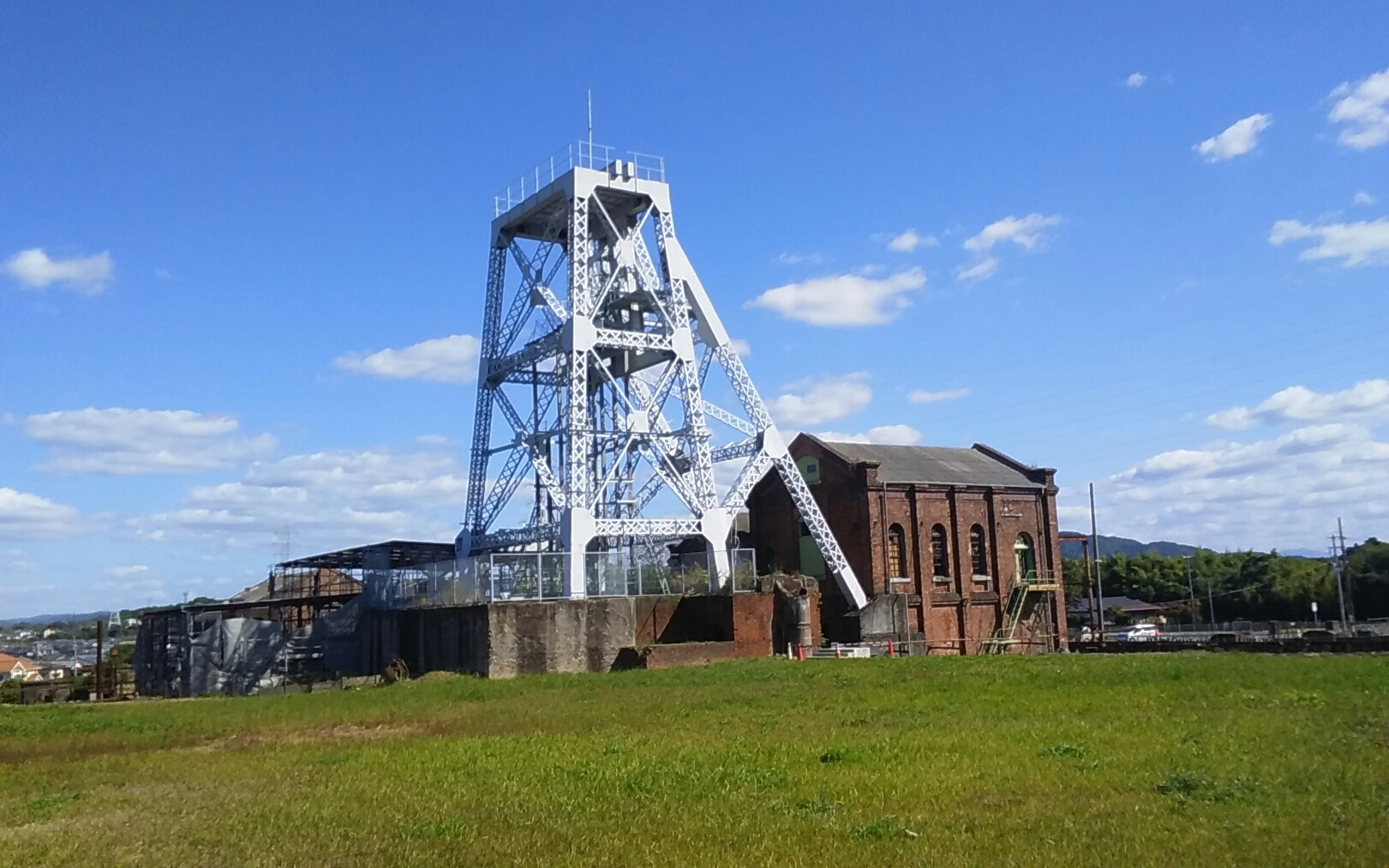
Manda shaft (万田坑) of the Miike coal mine

Arao (荒尾市, Arao-shi; Japanese pronunciation: [ä̀.ɾä́.ó̞(.ɕì)]) is a city in Kumamoto Prefecture, Japan. As of 31 July 2024, the city had an estimated population of 49,334 in 24,092 households, and a population density of 860 persons per km^{2}. The total area of the city is 57.37 km^{2} (22.15 sq mi).

== Geography ==
Arao is located in northwest Kumamoto Prefecture, about 40 kilometers northwest of Kumamoto City. It is bordered by Fukuoka Prefecture to the north and the Ariake Sea to the west.

=== Neighboring municipalities ===
Fukuoka Prefecture

- Ōmuta

Kumamoto Prefecture

- Nagasu
- Nankan
- Tamana

=== Climate ===
Arao has a humid subtropical climate (Köppen Cfa) characterized by warm summers and cool winters with light to no snowfall. The average annual temperature in Arao is 16.4 °C. The average annual rainfall is 1932 mm with September as the wettest month. The temperatures are highest on average in August, at around 26.9 °C, and lowest in January, at around 6.3 °C.

=== Demographics ===
Per Japanese census data, the population of Arao is as shown below

Historical population
Year	Pop.	±%
1950	67,202	—
1960	64,394	−4.2%
1970	55,452	−13.9%
1980	61,485	+10.9%
1990	59,507	−3.2%
2000	56,905	−4.4%
2010	55,321	−2.8%
2020	50,832	−8.1%

== History ==
The area of Arao was part of ancient Higo Province, During the Edo Period it was part of the holdings of Kumamoto Domain. After the Meiji restoration, the village of Arao was established with the creation of the modern municipalities system on April 1, 1889. It was raised to town status on April 1, 1919. On April 1, 1942 Arao merged with the villages of Ariake, Hirai, Yahata, and Fumoto to form the city of Arao.

== Government ==
Arao has a mayor-council form of government with a directly elected mayor and a unicameral city council of 18 members. Arao contributes one member to the Kumamoto Prefectural Assembly. In terms of national politics, the city is part of the Kumamoto 2nd district of the lower house of the Diet of Japan.

== Economy ==
Arao was once a large coal mining town, but it has since lost a great deal of its population, due to the closing of the mine in 1997. Until the Pacific War, the city was home to the Tokyo Second Army Arsenal Arao Factory (a vast gunpowder and explosives factory covering an area of approximately 33 million square meters and stretching 2.5 miles. Arao's political concentration is on tourism, to try to lure people back to this once heavily populated land. As for agricultural products, the Arao nashi pear is a fruit product grown widely in this town. The pear is round, brown and about the size of a bowling ball. Mandarin oranges are also widely cultivated. Due to the aging of producers, in recent years, efforts have been made to produce olives and olive oil.

One notable local product of this city is Shōdai ware, an art form almost completely exclusive to Arao, involving slow kilning and under glazing.

== Education ==
Arao has ten public elementary schools and three public junior high schools operated by the city government and one public high school operated by the Kumamoto Prefectural Board of Education. There is also one private high school. The prefecture also operates two schools for the handicapped.

== Transportation ==
=== Railways ===
JR Kyushu - Kagoshima Main Line

JA Arao - Minami-Arao

=== Highways ===
- Kyushu Expressway
- National Route 208
- National Route 389
- National Route 501

== Notable people from Arao ==
- Ishihara Shiko'o, (1874–1936), historian associated with the Shinpūren rebellion
- Tōten Miyazaki, (1871-1922), revolutionary and ally of Sun Yat-sen
