= The Making of Modern Japan =

Book by Marius Jansen

- Author: Marius Jansen
- Language: English
- Genre: History
- Publisher: Belknap Press
- Publication date: January 12, 2000
- Publication place: United States of America
- Pages: 936
- ISBN: 978-0-674-00991-2

The Making of Modern Japan is a 2000 history book by Marius Jansen.

== Background ==
The Making of Modern Japan is the last work by American author Marius Jansen, who died one week after the book was published. The book details the history of Japan from the Battle of Sekigahara in 1600 up until 2000, analysing the changes in Japan's economic policies, education, military, and both high and low culture.

== Reception ==
Monumenta Nipponica called The Making of Modern Japan a "reliable, solid, and authoritative interpretation of Japan's recent past", but also noted that Jansen sometimes made "broad judgements" that needed further scrutiny. The English Historical Review described the book as "one of the largest, and certainly one of the best" narrative histories of Japan, giving particular praise to its accessible style and tone, and its attention to how changes in Japan affected its neighboring countries.

Though they argued that the book was "comprehensive", Pacific Affairs lamented a lack of demographic details, such as changes in the birth and death rates, life expectancy, and epidemiology, which would have given The Making of Modern Japan a "human dimension" that it otherwise lacked.
