= Tōten Miyazaki =

Japanese social activist (1871–1922)

- 宮崎 滔天
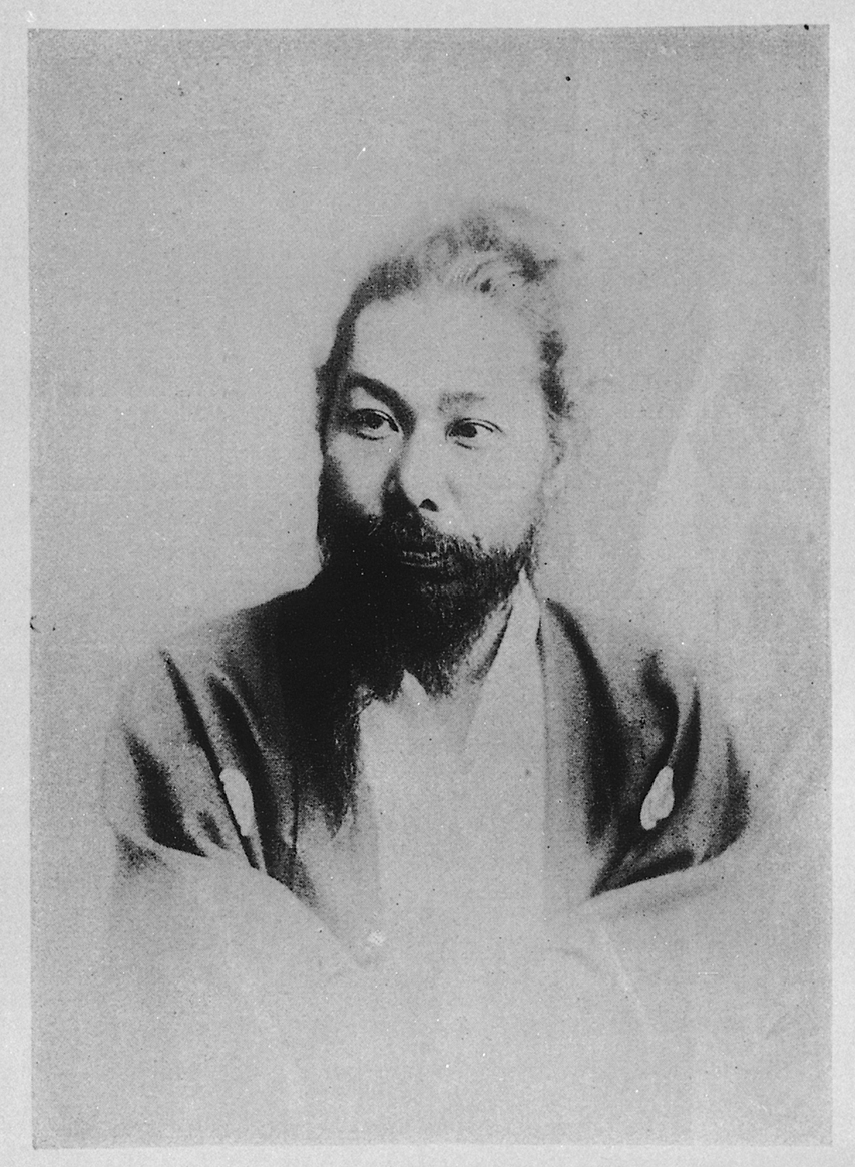
- Born: 23 January 1871; Arao, Kumamoto, Japan
- Died: 6 December 1922 (aged 51); Tokyo, Japan
- Occupation: Philosopher
- Children: Ryūsuke Miyazaki

Tōten Miyazaki (Japanese: 宮崎 滔天, Hepburn: Miyazaki Tōten) or Torazō Miyazaki (1 January 1871 – 6 December 1922) was a Japanese philosopher who aided and supported Sun Yat-sen during the Xinhai Revolution. He assisted Sun during his visits to Japan as he was wanted by Qing dynasty authorities.

== Biography ==
=== Genealogy ===
The history of the Miyazaki Family in Arao dates back to 1647, when Yajihei Masayuki Miyazaki settled as a local retainer of the shogunate. The family traced their ancestry to renowned poet Sugawara no Michizane (845–903) of the Hei'an period. The Miyazaki family was wealthy and maintained landlord status in Arao for about 200 years by the time of Chōzō Miyazaki, Tōten's father.

=== Early life ===
Miyazaki was born in 1873 as the eighth son of parents Chōzō (born Masakata) and Saki. Among his brothers were Social Activists Hachirō Miyazaki (known as the Rousseau of Kumamoto), Tamizō Miyazaki and Yazō Miyazaki. From a young age, Tōten was told to be like Hachirō when he grew up, and he saw himself as a natural born activist for liberty. Hachirō died in combat during the Satsuma Rebellion in 1877 when Toten was seven years old. Upon hearing this news, his father told his family that "nobody in this family will ever work for the government," and from then on, Tōten saw all bureaucrats as evil thieves. Miyazaki and his brothers learned the Niten Ichi-ryū martial art from their father.

=== Ōe Academy years ===
Miyazaki initially studied at Kumamoto Public Middle School, but was put off by his schoolmates' aspirations to become government officials. In 1885, he transferred to the Ōe Academy, the private school of the influential liberal journalist Tokutomi Soho, where he could learn about liberal theories of thinkers such as Maximilien Robespierre, Georges Danton, Richard Cobden, and John Bright. Miyazaki wrote of the school: "The Oe Academy was indeed an ideal home for me. No, more: it was a paradise of progressive liberalism and democracy." Miyazaki eventually became disillusioned with the school and began to question the sincerity of Soho and his students. Despite being an undoubtedly important skill for an activist, Miyazaki admitted in his autobiography that he was bad at public speaking at this time, to the point of feigning illness to avoid speaking at the school Speech Club.

=== Encounter with Christianity ===
Miyazaki left the academy and moved to Tokyo in 1886. While exploring the city, he entered a church where he was deeply moved by a choir hymn. He listened to the speech of a missionary, Charles H.D. Fisher, and said his words felt like seeing "the hope of light in the darkness of the night." He attended the church regularly from then on, learning English from the pastor's wife. He was also introduced by his former teacher at Ōe Academy to a Kumamoto missionary, Reverend Mr. Kozaki Hiromichi, who encouraged him to be baptised. Toten was upset to find out that Fisher was a Baptist minister, while Kozaki was a Congregationalist, meaning that he would have to choose a denomination. Ultimately, Toten chose to be baptised in the Congregationalist Church, a decision which he attributed to a preference for its republican character and liberal faith, showing that he had not abandoned the liberal movement in his heart. After announcing his baptism to Fisher, Fisher responded by angrily arguing about baptism, and telling Miyazaki that membership of the Congregationalist Church would not suffice for salvation.

Miyazaki then enrolled in the Eigaku (英学) (English and Western Studies) department of the Tokyo Professional School (東京専門学校, Tōkyō Senmon Gakkō), now Waseda University, but returned to Arao in 1887 due to trouble with school expenses. Upon returning to home, he was struck by the abject poverty among the townsfolk following a poor harvest. He wrote in his biography that he wondered, "Ah, does the provision of bread come first? Does the Gospel come first?". This marked an early discord between his faith and ideals.

In Arao, Miyazaki succeeded in converting his mother and brother, Yazō, to Christianity. He also learned from his brother Tamizō about Land Rights Equalisation and the theories of Henry George and Peter Kropotkin, which would in turn have an influence on his support for a revolution in China.

=== Study in Nagasaki and meeting with Isaac Abraham ===
He again left Arao in 1888 to attend the Kumamoto English School, and subsequently Cobleigh Seminary School (now Nagasaki Wesleyan University) in 1889. The school was American Methodist Episcopal school, but Miyazaki denied offers to convert as he felt he would be abandoning his devotion to liberalism. Miyazaki ultimately left Christianity while in Nagasaki after studying theology, philosophy and sociology, deciding that he would instead but his faith in rationalism. He was helped in this decision by a letter from his brother Yazō and friend from Waseda, Fujiyama, stating that they too left the faith for similar reasons. He still remained sentimentally attached to Christianity, however.

He finally abandoned supernaturalism outright when he met an eccentric Swedish beggar named Isaac Abraham, who shocked Miyazaki by warning him against religion and that even in America and Europe, the home of liberal ideas, many people still suffer in poverty. Planning to start a school with local supporters who also had an interest in Isaac, they requested the help of Maeda Kagaku (前田下学), eldest son of politician and liberal activist Maeda Kagashi (前田案山子). While the school was being set up, Miyazaki and Isaac lived in Kagaku's hometown teaching local children English, with Miyazaki acting as Isaac's interpreter. There, he met and fell in love with Kagaku's younger sister, Tsuchi. Isaac's personal philosophy of anarchism involved a fanatical glorification of nature, which included open defecation in local fields. This strange lifestyle led over twenty of the school's students to leave immediately, causing the plans for a school to fall apart. Isaac was later deported to America.

=== Belief in Chinese revolution ===
After falling deeply in love with Tsuchi, Miyazaki gradually developed guilt as he felt an early marriage would limit his ability to carry out his ambition of ending poverty around the world. He thus began planning to study in America to study a liberal democracy and relieve his guilt about his lack of progress. While staying in Nagasaki, waiting for the boat which would take him to Hawaii, he was visited by his brother Yazō who spoke to him about Revolutionary Pan-Asianism. Yazō believed that a world revolution was necessary to end poverty, and that the first step in this revolution would have to be China. This sentiment resonated strongly with Miyazaki. Miyazaki later wrote "Truly, that one night became the one that set the course for half my life." Toten and Yazō then began to plan to learn Chinese language and culture. His other brother, Tamizō, refused to join as he found their plan to pretend to be Chinese deceitful.

In 1891, Miyazaki travelled to Shanghai on the Saikyō Maru to learn Chinese language and customs, but returned to Japan shortly after to seek money he had loaned a Nagasaki eccentric. He refused to stay among the Japanese community in China as he felt they were bent on the Japanese occupation of China, which he strongly opposed.

=== Meeting with Kim Ok-gyun ===
While at home in Japan, Miyazaki married Tsuchi Maeda who gave birth to his first son Ryusuke. Determined to make progress on his plans with Yazō, Miyazaki decided to meet with Korean revolutionary Kim Ok-gyun, who was in exile in Japan at the time following the failed Gaspin Coup. During their meeting, Kim praised Miyazaki's plan to move to Shanghai and agreed that China would be the key to the future of Asia. The two made plans to eventually meet in Shanghai, but Kim was assassinated during his voyage across in 1894. Miyazaki attended Kim's funeral in Tokyo.

The Donghak Peasant Revolution ended ties between China and Japan. Miyazaki planned to avoid being drafted in the coming conflict with China by moving abroad.

=== Travel in Siam ===
In July 1895, Miyazaki made contact with adventurer Iwamoto Chizuna. He then got a job as an agent in Bangkok for a Hiroshima travel company. He travelled there multiple times with the plan to learn Chinese from the sizeable Chinese population in Bangkok, but aside from his interactions with Chinese workers on the boat journey, he failed in this endeavour. He instead became involved in a venture to establish a Japanese settlement and lumber enterprise there, which also ended in failure. Between his trips to Siam, he also got news from his brother Yazō in Yokohama who had made contact with Chan Siu Bak, a revolutionary who had fled China after the failed Guangzhou Uprising. This contact would prove essential in Miyazaki's connection with Sun Yat-sen. Miyazaki returned from Siam for the last time in 1896.

=== Death of Yazō and meeting with Sun Yat-sen ===
Miyazaki travelled to Yokohama to find that Yazō, who had inspired him to aim for a revolution in China, had died. While in Tokyo, he met with future Prime Minister Inukai Tsuyoshi who advised him to give up his plans in Siam and focus on China. Inukai used his influence to have Miyazaki and his comrades sent to China by the Foreign Ministry to investigate the state of secret societies in China. Before leaving for China, Miyazaki met with Chan Siu Bak who taught him about the Chinese revolutionary movement and told him about his comrade Sun Yat-sen, who was being imprisoned in London at the time. While in China on the orders of the ministry, he became connected with multiple members of Sun's Revive China Society.

Hearing that Sun Yat-sen was due to travel to Japan, Miyazaki returned to Yokohama to meet him. They first met in the house of Chan Siu Bak. Miyazaki was at first disappointed by Sun's sloppy appearance (he greeted Miyazaki in his bed clothes) but was won over by his fluid and passionate rhetoric as he discussed the ideal of Republicanism and the pathetic state of China at the time. Miyazaki described him during their first meeting in his biography, "How noble his thought, how sharp his insight, how great his conception, how burning his fervor!"

Tōten Miyazaki would later register Sun for his safety under the name Nakayama (中山) at the "Crane Hotel" (對鶴館). This name would later be converted to the more popular Chinese name Sun Zhongshan (孫中山).

=== Return to China ===
Miyazaki moved back to Hong Kong around the time of the Hundred Day's Reform, where he continued to acquaint himself with members of various secret societies such as the Elder Brothers Society, Triad, and White Lotus. Shortly after his return, he met with Filipino politician Mariano Ponce and introduced him to Pan-Asianists in Japan. Together they later organised the attempted shipment of arms on the Nunobiki Maru during the Philippine–American War. Following this, he met with Kang Youwei, a central figure in the Hundred Day's Reform, which had now failed and resulted in the house-imprisonment of the Guangxu Emperor. He convinced Kang to go into hiding in Japan and organised his transport across. Miyazaki hoped to unite the moderate reformers such as Kang and his supporters with the revolutionaries such as Sun and the Triad, but Kang was not open to working with Sun.

=== Support of failed Huizhou Revolution ===
Miyazaki was present for a ceremony marking the unification of the Elder Brothers Society, Triad and Revive China Society under Sun's leadership, a deal which precipitated the Huizhou Uprising (惠州起義) of 1900. He then returned to Yokohama where he raised thousands of yen in military funds to support the rising. Before the conflict, he went to Singapore to once again try to convince Kang Youwei to work with Sun Yat-sen. However, Kang mistakenly believed that Miyazaki was planning to assassinate him, and reported him to the British authorities in Singapore to have him arrested and deported. Miyazaki was arrested alongside a Japanese associate, Koshichirō Kiyofuji (清藤 幸七郎) on 6 July 1900, and spent a number of days in prison before being exiled from Singapore for a period of five years. He left Singapore and headed for Hong Kong with a group including Sun Yat-sen, but found that his exile was also enforced by the British authorities there. The uprising was aborted, and Miyazaki returned to Japan, facing criticism and suspicion from his Japanese comrades.

=== Transition to naniwa-bushi and autobiography ===
Miyazaki resolved to channel his disgrace from the failed coup into a career as a naniwa-bushi (Rōkyoku) balladeer. He performed under the stage name Tochuken Ushiemon (桃中軒牛右衛門). He apprenticed under, and wrote lyrics for, the legendary Tochuken Kumoemon (桃中軒雲右衛門). A plaque with the inscription "To Tochuken Ushiemon-kun, from Sun Yat-sen” hangs in the Roukyoku Centre in Asakusa, Tokyo. He used this art form to articulate his philosophy to ordinary Japanese people, and in his essay "Kyōkaku to Edokko to Naniwabushi" he described his own performances as "art for the common people." During this period, he wrote his influential autobiography "My Thirty-Three Year's Dream," published it on 20 August 1902. The popularity of an abridged translation of the autobiography in China led Sun Yat-sen to grow in popularity and support.

=== Tongmenghui membership and 1911 Revolution ===
Tōten retained his revolutionary aspirations, and in 1905 he was involved in the founding of the Tongmenghui Chinese revolutionary group. In 1906, he also helped establish a journal with others such as Saburo Wada, secretary of Liberal Party founder Itagaki Taisuke, Shu Hirayama, and Nagatomo Kayano. The "Revolutionary Review" was published for 10 volumes from 25 March 1907 to 5 September 1907, with the journal supporting Sun Yet-sen's 1911 Xinhai Revolution.

In January 1912 he published a speech transcript entitled Chinese Revolutionary Army Talks and Revolutionary Affairs （高瀬魁介編、明治出版社, to help publicise the revolution. He would travel back and forth between Japan and China regularly for the remainder of his life. In 1917, he visited Hunan, China to give a lecture about how the Japanese helped to put an end to the white westerners' control of Asia. Mao Zedong attended the lecture.

=== Later years and death ===
He died at the age of 51 of urinary complications due to kidney disease on 6 December 1922 in Tokyo. A memorial service, hosted by Sun Yat-sen and others, was held in Shanghai. In the grounds of Hakusan Shrine in Bunkyo Ward, Tokyo, the stone steps on which Sun Yat-sen sat together with Tōten during his exile are preserved along with a monument honoring Sun Yat-sen. He is remembered alongside the Yamada brothers, Yoshimasa Yamada and Jūzaburō Yamada, as key Japanese supporters of the Xinhai Revolution.

== Legacy ==
The Nanjing Historical Remains Museum of Chinese Modern History has bronze statues of Sun and Miyazaki placed alongside each other.

The Birthplace of the Miyazaki Brothers museum in Arao is dedicated to Tōten and his brothers, and their relationship with Sun.

== Bibliography ==
- My Thirty-Three Years' Dream

== See also ==
- Names of Sun Yat-sen
