= Minami-Arao Station =

Railway station in Arao, Kumamoto Prefecture, Japan

Minami-Arao Station 南荒尾駅
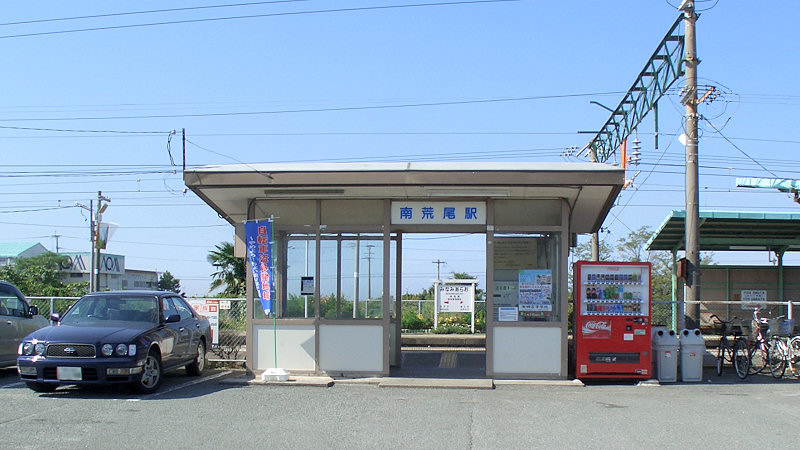
- Minami Station in 2007

General information
- Location: Masunaga, Arao-shi, Kumamoto-ken 864-0032; Japan
- Coordinates: 32°57′57″N 130°25′58″E
- Operator: JR Kyushu
- Line: ■ Kagoshima Main Line,
- Distance: 154.8 km from Mojikō
- Platforms: 2 side platforms
- Tracks: 2

Construction
- Structure type: At grade
- Parking: Available
- Accessible: No - platforms linked by footbridge

Other information
- Status: Unstaffed
- Website: Official website

History
- Opened: 1 May 1950

Passengers
- FY2020: 294 daily
- Rank: 283th (among JR Kyushu stations)

Services
| Preceding station | JR Kyushu | Following station |
|---|---|---|
| Arao towards Kagoshima | Kagoshima Main Line | Nagasu towards Mojikō |
Location
- Location within Fukuoka Prefecture Location within Japan

Minami-Arao Station (南荒尾駅, Minami-Arao-eki) is a passenger railway station located in the city of Arao, Kumamoto Prefecture, Japan. It is operated by JR Kyushu.

== Lines ==
The station is served by the Kagoshima Main Line and is located 154.8 km from the starting point of the line at Mojiko. Both local and rapid services on the line stop at the station.

== Layout ==
The station consists of two side platforms serving two tracks. The station building is a simple steel and glass structure which is unstaffed and serves only to house a waiting room, an automatic ticket vending machine and a Sugoca card reader. Access to the opposite side platform is by means of a footbridge.

=== Platforms ===
| 1 | ■ ■ Kagoshima Main Line | for Tamana and Kumamoto |
| 2 | ■ JB Kagoshima Main Line | for Ōmuta, Kurume and Tosu |

== History ==
Japanese National Railways (JGR) opened the station on 1 May 1950 as an additional station on the existing track of the Kagoshima Main Line. With the privatization of JNR on 1 April 1987, JR Kyushu took over control of the station.

== Passenger statistics ==
In fiscal 2020, the station was used by an average of 284 passengers daily (boarding passengers only), and it ranked 283rd among the busiest stations of JR Kyushu.

== Surrounding area ==
- Arao Municipal Ariake Elementary School
- Arao Tidal Flats Waterfowl and Wetlands Center
