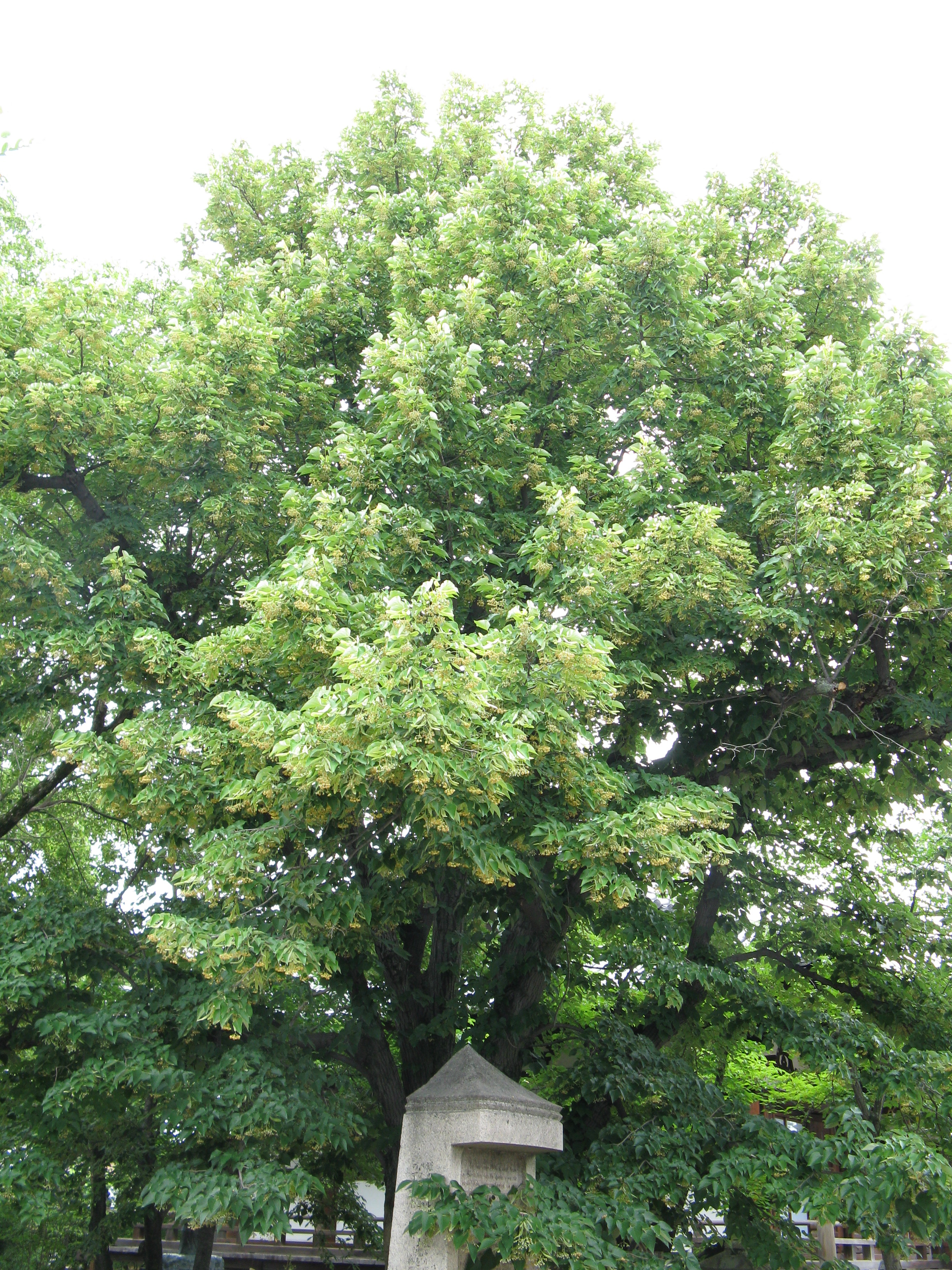
- In Osaka, Japan

Scientific classification
- Kingdom: Plantae
- Clade: Tracheophytes
- Clade: Angiosperms
- Clade: Eudicots
- Clade: Rosids
- Order: Malvales
- Family: Malvaceae
- Genus: Tilia
- Species: T. miqueliana

Binomial name
- Tilia miqueliana Maxim.

= Tilia miqueliana =

Species of tree

Tilia miqueliana is a species of linden.

In Japan, Tilia miqueliana is among hibakujumoku plants.
