= My Thirty-Three Years' Dream =

Autobiography by Tōten Miyazaki (1902)

My Thirty-Three Years' Dream: The Autobiography of Miyazaki Tōten (三十三年之夢, Sanjūsannen no yume) is an autobiography written by Tōten Miyazaki, first published in 1902. The English translation, published by Princeton University Press in 1982, was done by Marius B. Jansen (translator) and Etō Shinkichi (editor, Etō is the surname here).

The title refers to his age in the East Asian age reckoning, which starts at age one instead of age zero. In the Western reckoning, Miyazaki was 32 years old at the time he wrote it.

Joshua Fogel, in the Asia-Pacific Journal, wrote in 2007 that the work is "still one of the indispensable sources on Sun and the 1911 Revolution."

== Background ==
The first book version was published in 1902. In 1903 the first translation in Chinese appeared, and subsequent translations had differing titles. A republishing of the Chinese version happened in 1925, and a new printing of the Japanese version came in 1926. Additional version of the Chinese version came in 1932 and 1934, and another Japanese edition was published in 1943.

There was a version of the original Japanese text, published by Heibonsha in 1967, that had corrections made to it. Etō Shinkichi and Miyazaki Ryūsuke, the latter a son of Miyazaki, edited this version. The 1982 translation used the 1967 version as a basis, and Etō became the editor of the translation.

There is also a version that is within the five volume collection Miyazaki Tōten zenshū (宮崎滔天全集), published by Heibonsha beginning in 1971. Shimada Kenji edited that version of the autobiography, and the collection's editors were Miyazaki Ryūsuke and Onogawa Hidemi. Joshua A. Fogel described this collection as "a definitive edition of his collected works".

== Contents ==
The book describes the feelings regarding politics when he came of age and his involvement in political affairs. According to Helen Ballhatchet, a book reviewer, Miyazaki perceived himself as failing at his goals by the time he wrote the book.

The introduction is in the form of an essay. The book has a set of footnotes, many on biographical figures.

== Reception ==
Ballhatchet stated that the English version was "welcome" and praised the "disarming honesty and humour". She also praised how the editor and translator worked together as native speakers of Japanese and English. Ballhatchet stated that there were some mistakes in the translation, but that the translation was "almost perfect" and that he mistakes were "minor points" which "in no way detract from the whole."

Fogel described the translation as "superb".
