= Arao Station (Kumamoto) =

Railway station in Arao, Kumamoto Prefecture, Japan

JB 28 Arao Station 荒尾駅
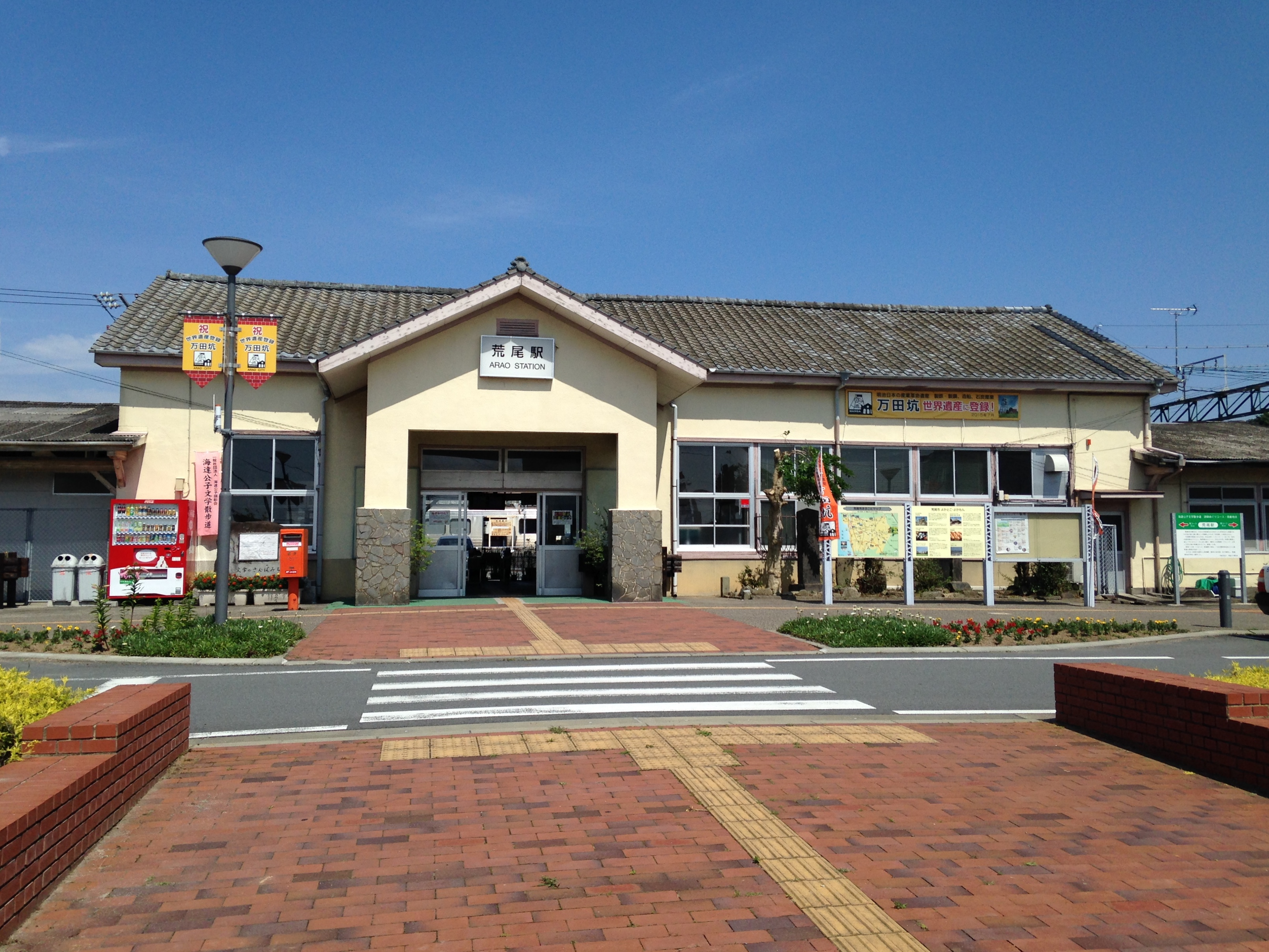
- Arao Station in 2016

General information
- Location: Manda, Arao-shi, Kumamoto-ken 864-0002; Japan
- Coordinates: 32°59′39.4″N 130°26′3.2″E
- Operator: JR Kyushu
- Line: JB Kagoshima Main Line
- Distance: 151.6 km from Mojikō
- Platforms: 2 island platforms
- Tracks: 4 + 3 passing loops
- Connections: Bus stop

Construction
- Structure type: At grade
- Parking: Available
- Accessible: No - platforms linked by footbridge

Other information
- Status: JR Kyushu ticket window (Midori no Madoguchi)
- Website: Official website

History
- Opened: 1 November 1912
- Former names: Manda (until 15 June 1943)

Passengers
- FY2020: 776 daily
- Rank: 169rd (among JR Kyushu stations)

Services
Preceding station	JR Kyushu	Following station
Minami-Arao towards Kagoshima	Kagoshima Main Line	Ōmuta towards Mojikō
Location
- Location within Kumamoto Prefecture Location within Japan

Arao Station (荒尾駅, Arao-eki) is a passenger railway station located in the city of Arao, Kumamoto Prefecture, Japan. It is operated by JR Kyushu.

== Lines ==
The station is served by the Kagoshima Main Line and is located 151.6 km from the starting point of the line at Mojiko. Both local and rapid services on the line stop at the station.

== Layout ==
The station consists of two island platforms serving four tracks with passing loops to the north and south. The station building is wooden structure of traditional Japanese design with a tiled roof. It houses a staffed ticket window (with a Midori no Madoguchi facility) and a waiting area. Access to the island platforms is by means of a footbridge.

=== Platforms ===
1, 2	■ JB Kagoshima Main Line	for Ōmuta, Tosu and Hakata
3, 4	■ JB Kagoshima Main Line	for Kumamoto and Yatsushiro

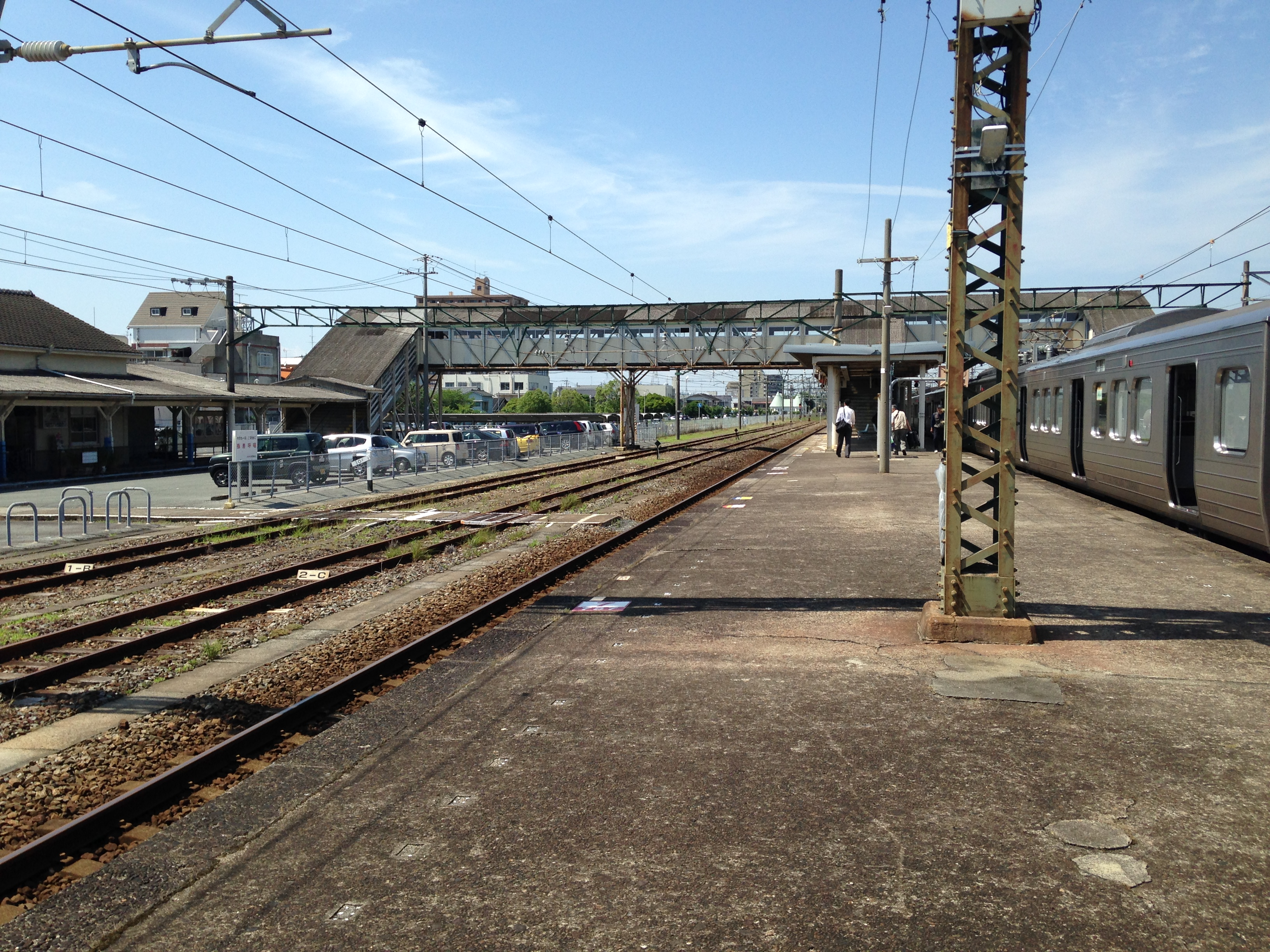
Passing loops run between the station building (left) and the first platform.

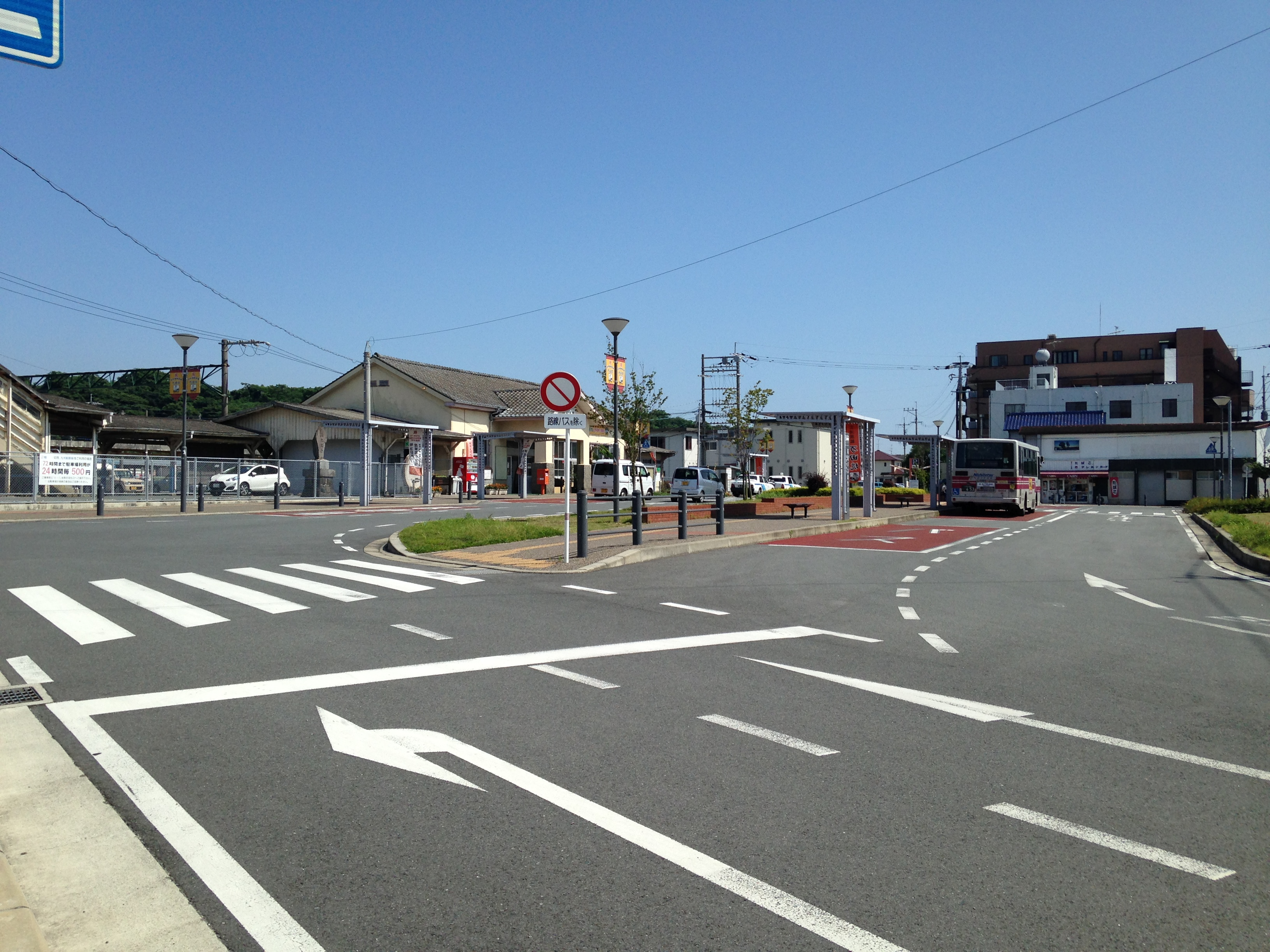
A view of the station forecourt.

== History ==
Japanese Government Railways (JGR) opened the station with the name Manda Station (万田駅) on 1 November 1912 as an additional station on the existing track of the Kagoshima Main Line. On 15 June 1943, the station name was changed to Arao. With the privatization of Japanese National Railways (JNR), the successor of JGR, on 1 April 1987, JR Kyushu took over control of the station.

== Passenger statistics ==
In fiscal 2020, the station was used by an average of 776 passengers daily (boarding passengers only), and it ranked 169th among the busiest stations of JR Kyushu.

== Surrounding area ==
- Arao City Hall
- Arao Racetrack
- Arao City Manda Elementary Schooli
