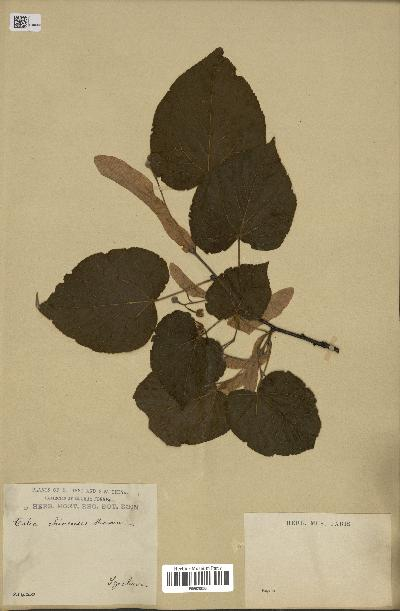

Scientific classification
- Kingdom: Plantae
- Clade: Tracheophytes
- Clade: Angiosperms
- Clade: Eudicots
- Clade: Rosids
- Order: Malvales
- Family: Malvaceae
- Genus: Tilia
- Species: T. chinensis

Binomial name
- Tilia chinensis Maxim.

= Tilia chinensis =

Species of tree

Tilia chinensis (Chinese linden, Chinese: 椴树) is a species of lime or linden tree that is endemic to China. It flowers in July or August when honey bees collect honey from its flowers. Especially famous is honey taken from the Chinese linden flowers in Changbai Mountain.
