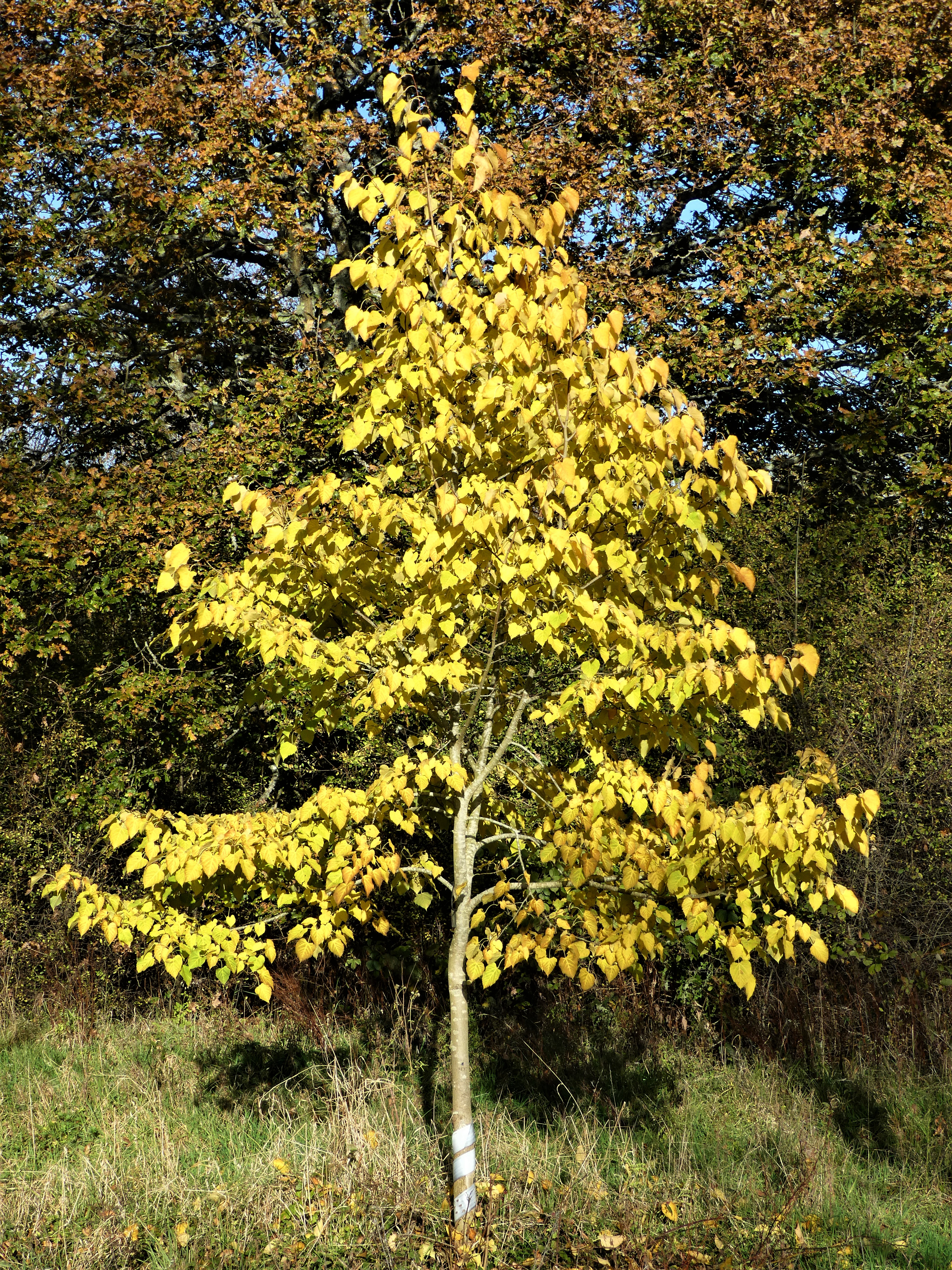
- Tilia chingiana autumn colour

Scientific classification
- Kingdom: Plantae
- Clade: Tracheophytes
- Clade: Angiosperms
- Clade: Eudicots
- Clade: Rosids
- Order: Malvales
- Family: Malvaceae
- Genus: Tilia
- Species: T. chingiana

Binomial name
- Tilia chingiana Hu & W.C.Cheng

Synonyms
- Tilia breviradiata Rehder; Tilia orocryptica Croizat; Tilia tuan Szyszlowicz var. breviradiata Rehder

= Tilia chingiana =

Species of tree

Tilia chingiana Hu & W.C.Cheng is a medium-sized tree native to the provinces of Anhui, Jiangsu, Jiangxi, and Zhejiang in China.

== Description ==
Tilia chingiana is a deciduous tree growing to 15 m tall, its bark grey and smooth. The cordate leaves are offset at the base, 5–10 cm long, and borne on 2.5–4.0 cm petioles. In China the tree flowers during June and July. The seeds occur singly or in pairs, and are relatively large, averaging 12 mm long by 8 mm diameter; over four times the size of Small-leafed lime seeds.

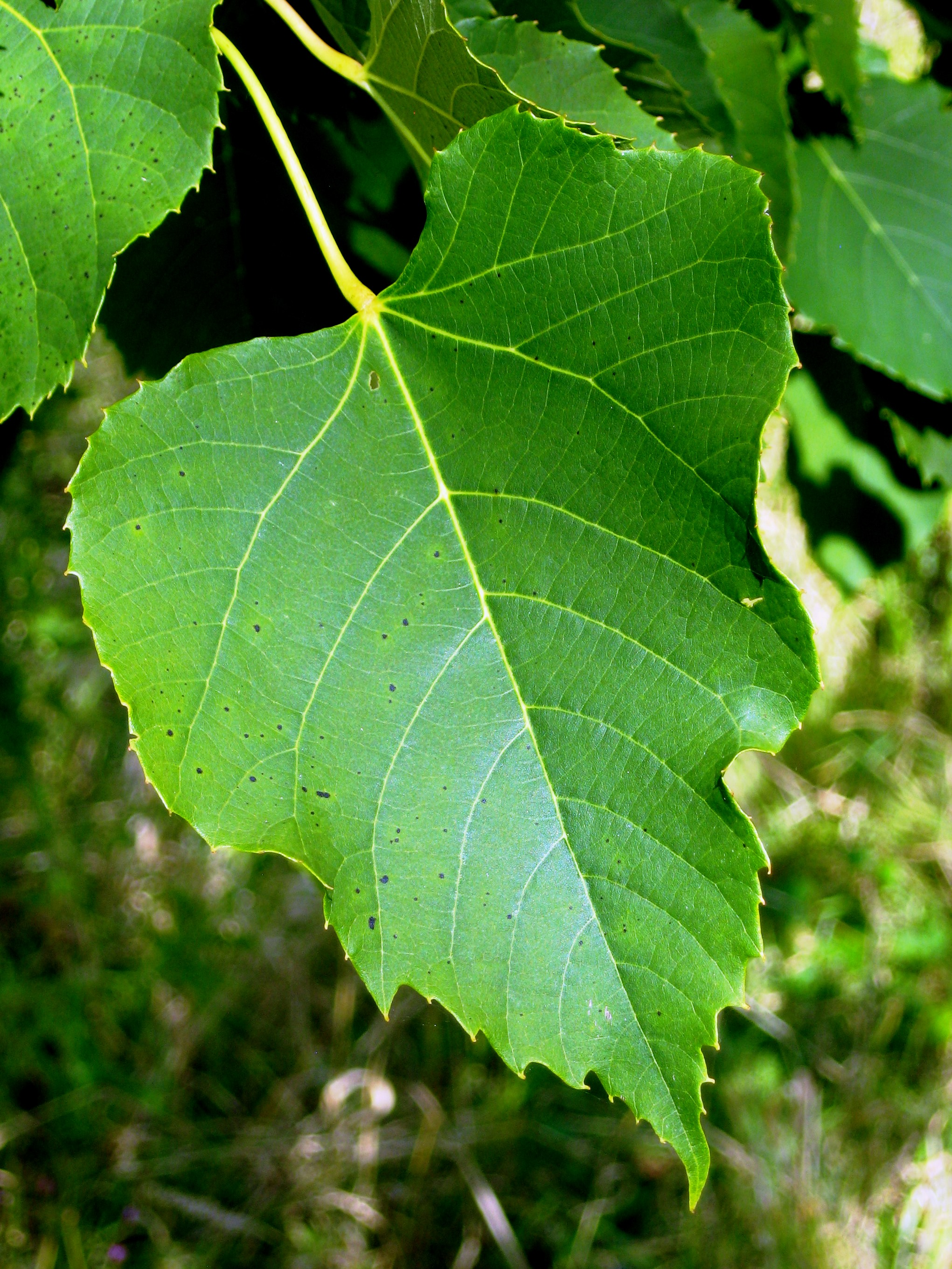
T. chingiana leaf

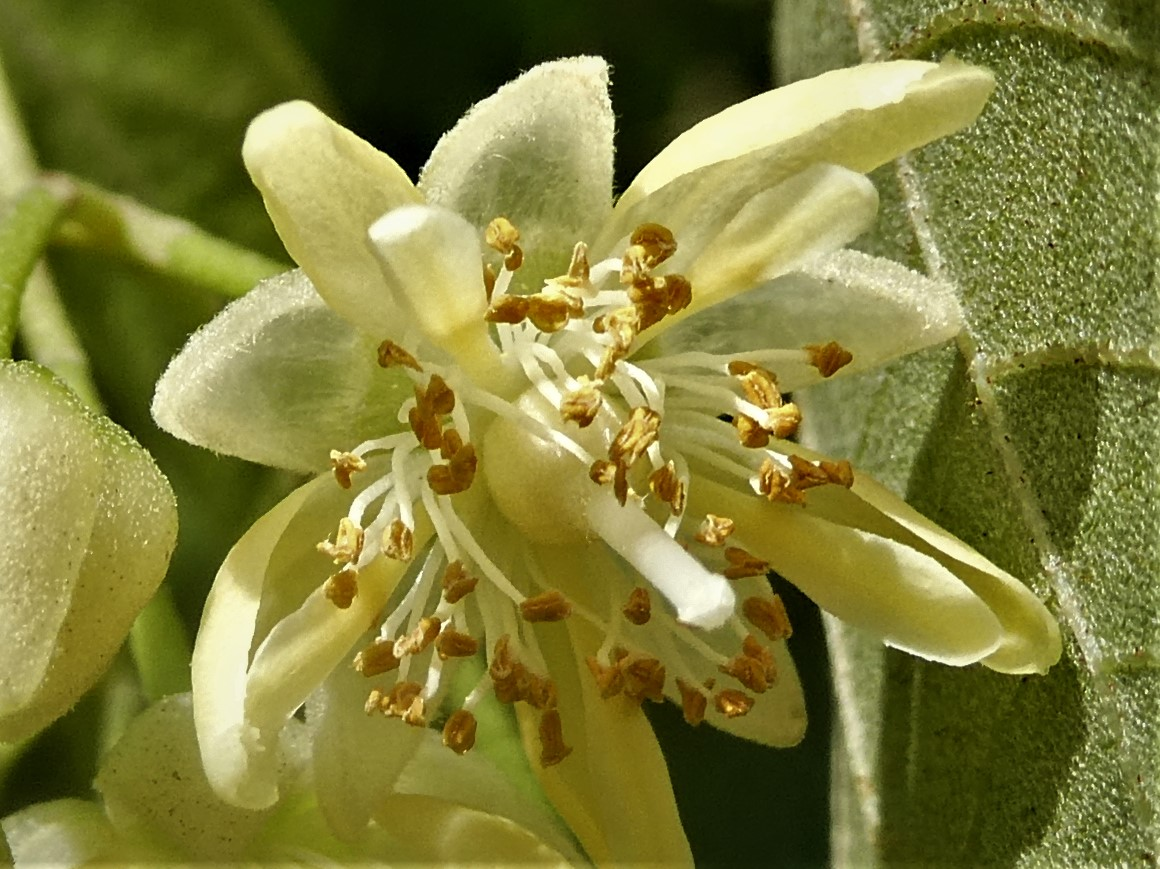
T. chingiana flower

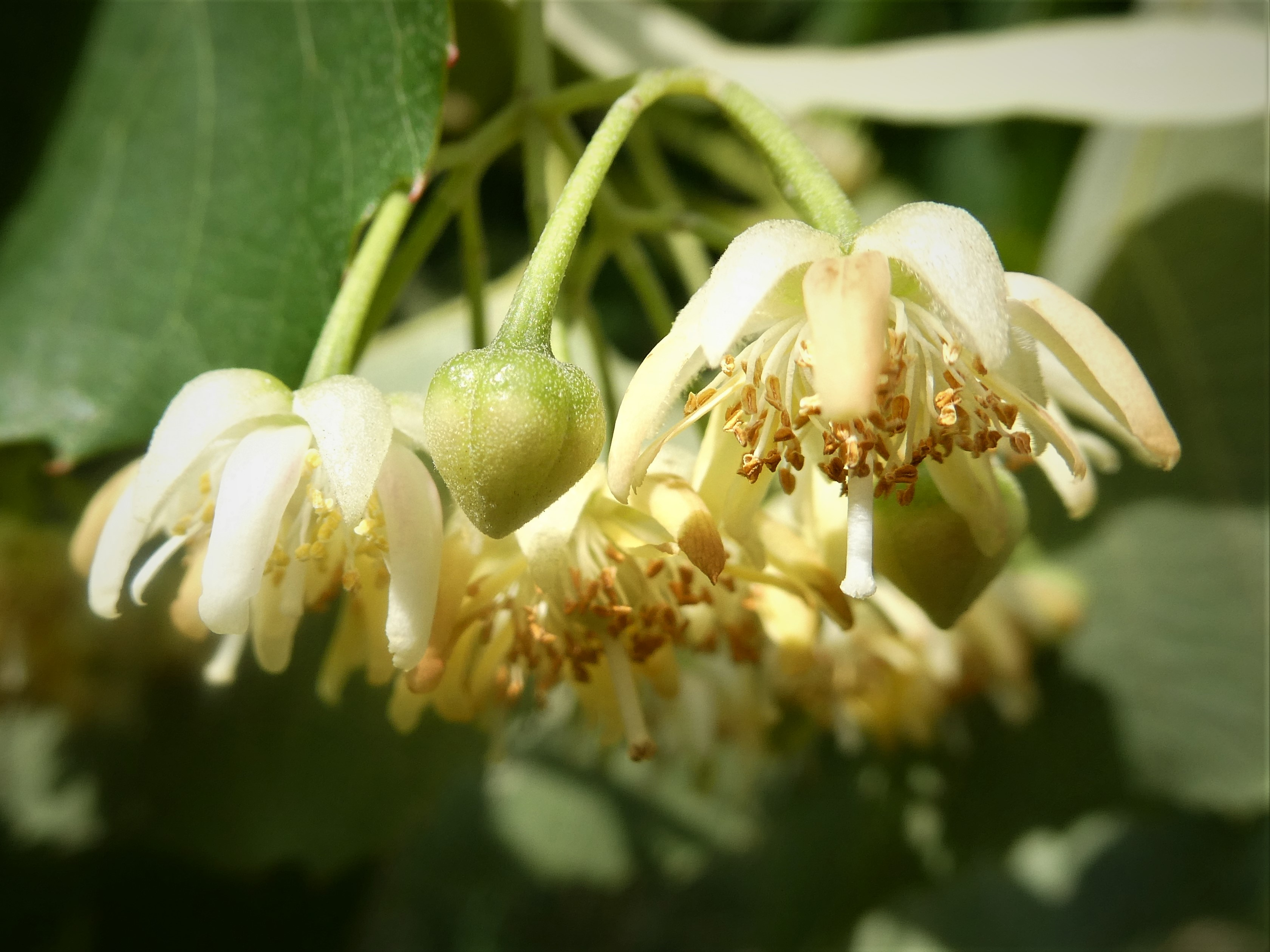
T. chingiana cyme

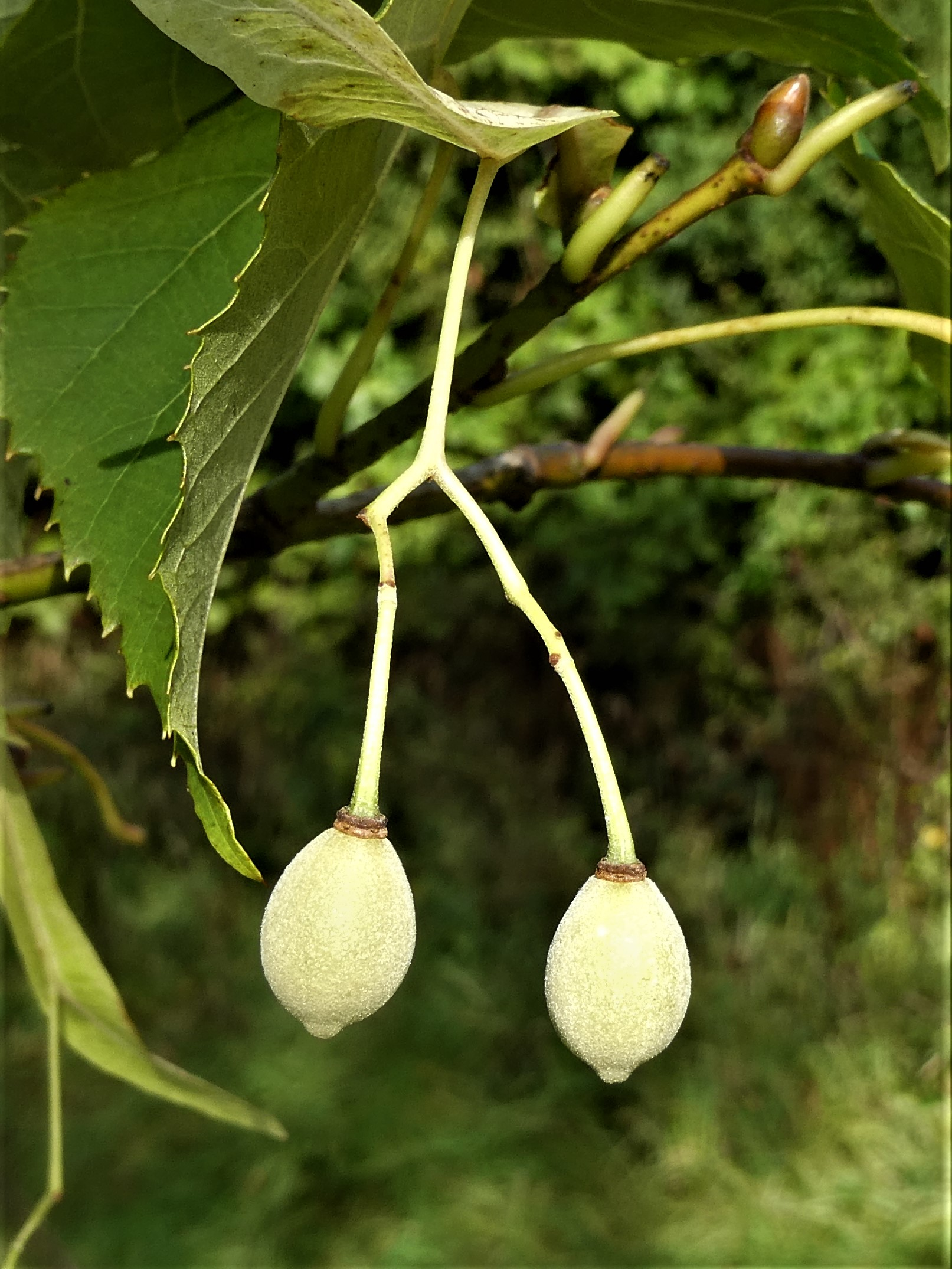
T. chingiana seeds

== Cultivation ==
The tree has been widely introduced to Europe and North America.
