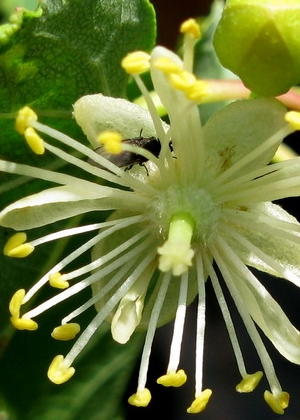
- Flower of Nasczokin's Lime

Scientific classification
- Kingdom: Plantae
- Clade: Embryophytes
- Clade: Tracheophytes
- Clade: Spermatophytes
- Clade: Angiosperms
- Clade: Eudicots
- Clade: Rosids
- Order: Malvales
- Family: Malvaceae
- Genus: Tilia
- Species: T. nasczokinii

Binomial name
- Tilia nasczokinii Stepanov

= Tilia nasczokinii =

Species of tree

Tilia nasczokinii Stepanov, commonly known as Nasczokin's lime or Nasczokin's linden, is a rare deciduous tree or shrub endemic to Siberia in Russia.

== Description ==
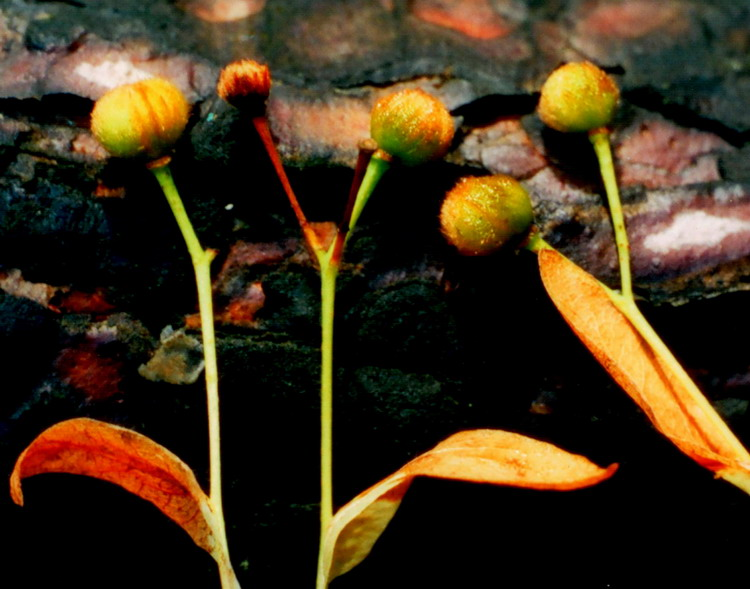
Fruits

The tree grows to 20 m tall, its bark pale grey and fissured. The leaves are cordate or broadly ovate, up to 15 cm long. The tiny yellowish, almost white flowers of 0.8–1 cm in diameter appear in clusters of 1–3. The stigmata are stellate, and the ovary is strip hairy. Long hairs and short hairs grow in longitudinal, alternating rows. The young ovary is white haired and becomes rusty upon maturity. The fruit is flattened.

== Ecology ==
The habitat of Tilia nasczokinii is coniferous forests of Pinus sylvestris.

== Cultivation ==
The tree is not known to be in cultivation in western Europe or North America.

== Etymology ==
The tree is named for the Russian botanist Vladimir D. Nashchokin (Russian: Владимир Дмитриевич Нащокин), who studied it.

== Conservation status ==
Tilia nasczokinii is considered a threatened species and included in the Red Book of Krasnoyarsk Krai. One locus is in the conservation zone of the Stolby Nature Sanctuary.
