= Tilia hupehensis =

Scientific classification
- Kingdom: Plantae
- Clade: Embryophytes
- Clade: Tracheophytes
- Clade: Spermatophytes
- Clade: Angiosperms
- Clade: Eudicots
- Clade: Rosids
- Order: Malvales
- Family: Malvaceae
- Genus: Tilia
- Species: T. hupehensis

Binomial name
- Tilia hupehensis W.C.Cheng ex Hung T.Chang

Species of flowering plant

Tilia hupehensis, the Hubei lime, is a species of flowering plant in the family Malvaceae.
