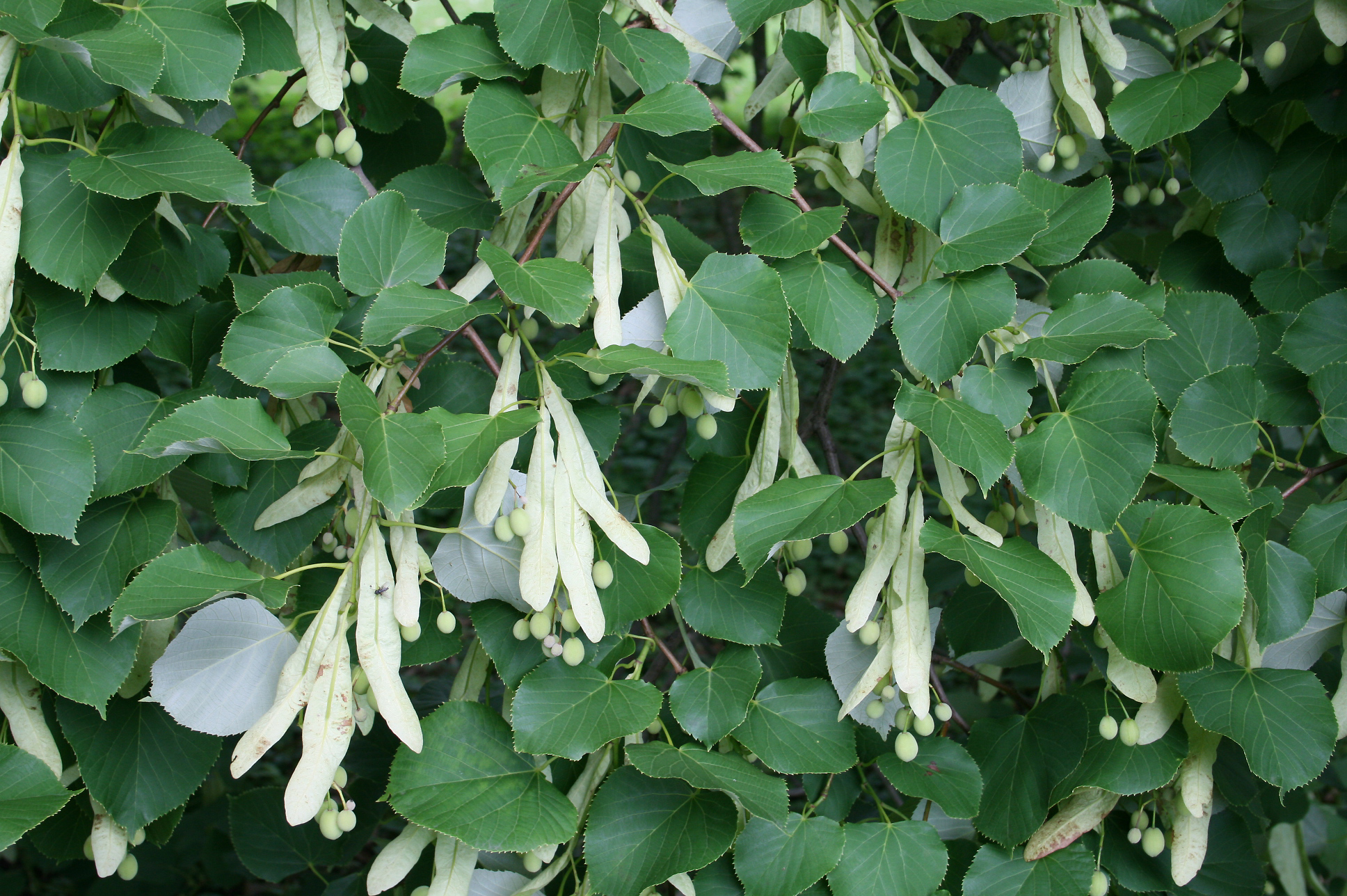
- At the Meise Botanic Garden

Scientific classification
- Kingdom: Plantae
- Clade: Embryophytes
- Clade: Tracheophytes
- Clade: Spermatophytes
- Clade: Angiosperms
- Clade: Eudicots
- Clade: Rosids
- Order: Malvales
- Family: Malvaceae
- Genus: Tilia
- Species: T. oliveri

Binomial name
- Tilia oliveri Szyszył.

Synonyms
- Tilia pendula V.Engl. ex C.K.Schneid.

= Tilia oliveri =

Species of flowering plant

Tilia oliveri, the Chinese white lime or Oliver's lime, is a species of flowering plant in the family Malvaceae, native to central and southeastern China. It has found use as a street tree, and does well in the United Kingdom, but is not commercially available in the United States.
