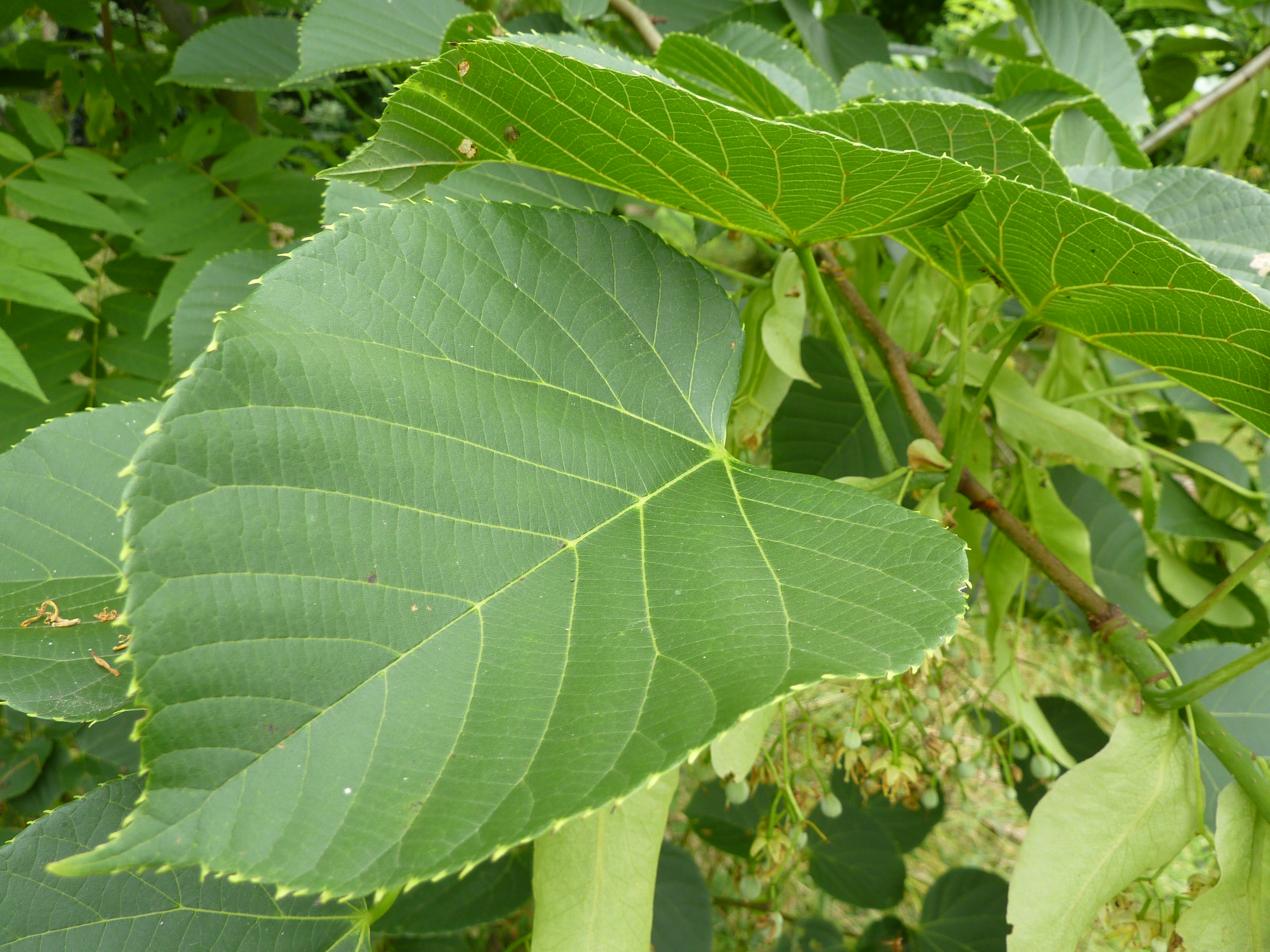
- Leaves are large
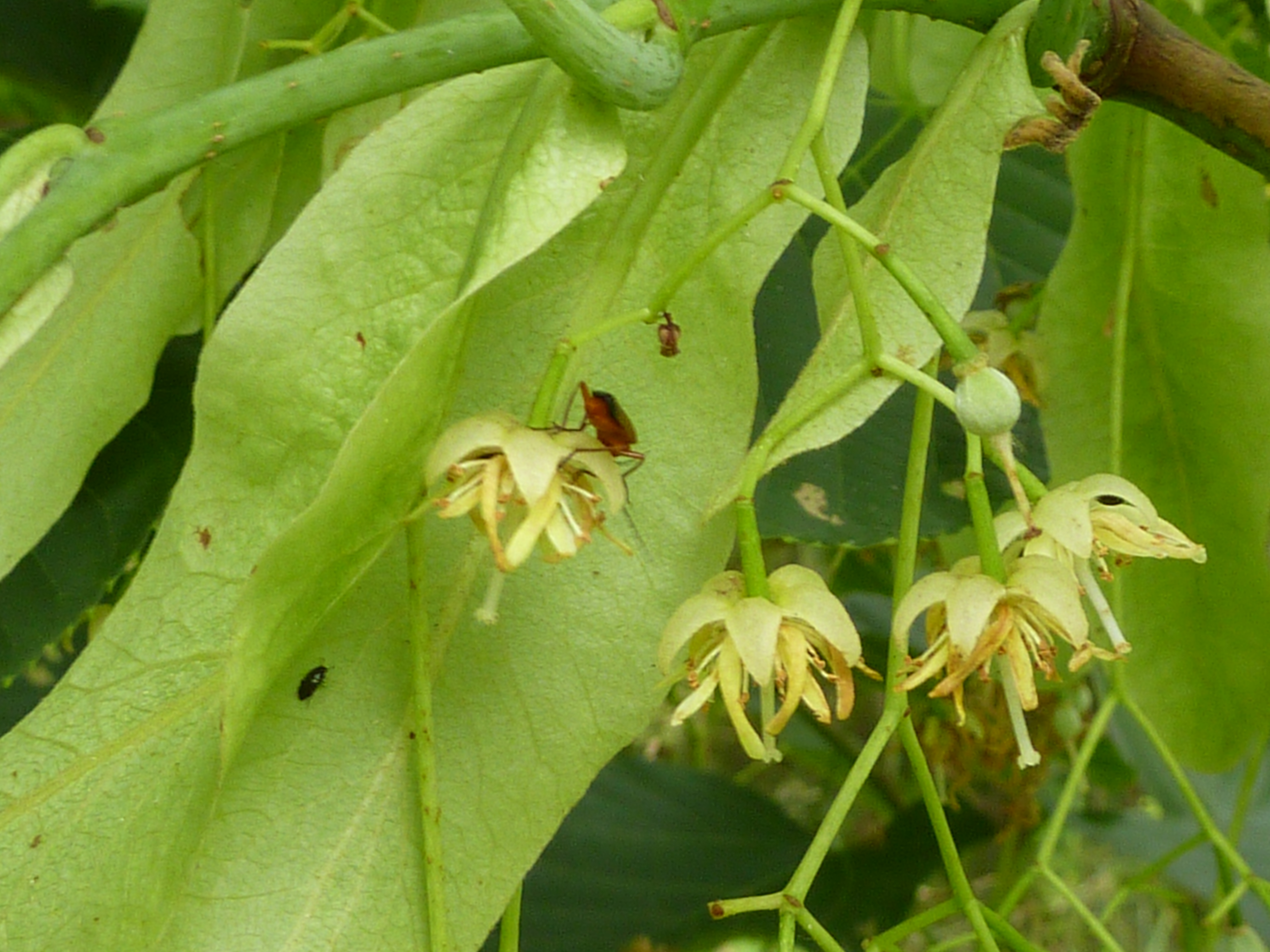
- Close up of flowers and bracts

Scientific classification
- Kingdom: Plantae
- Clade: Embryophytes
- Clade: Tracheophytes
- Clade: Spermatophytes
- Clade: Angiosperms
- Clade: Eudicots
- Clade: Rosids
- Order: Malvales
- Family: Malvaceae
- Genus: Tilia
- Species: T. nobilis

Binomial name
- Tilia nobilis Rehder & E.H.Wilson

= Tilia nobilis =

Species of flowering plant

Tilia nobilis, the noble lime, is a species of flowering plant in the family Malvaceae, native to south-central China. A tree typically 4 to 12 m (13 to 39 ft) tall, it is found in forests at elevations of 1,800 to 2,500 m (5,900 to 8,200 ft). An octoploid, it has large leaves and floral bracts. It is occasionally available from specialty nurseries.
