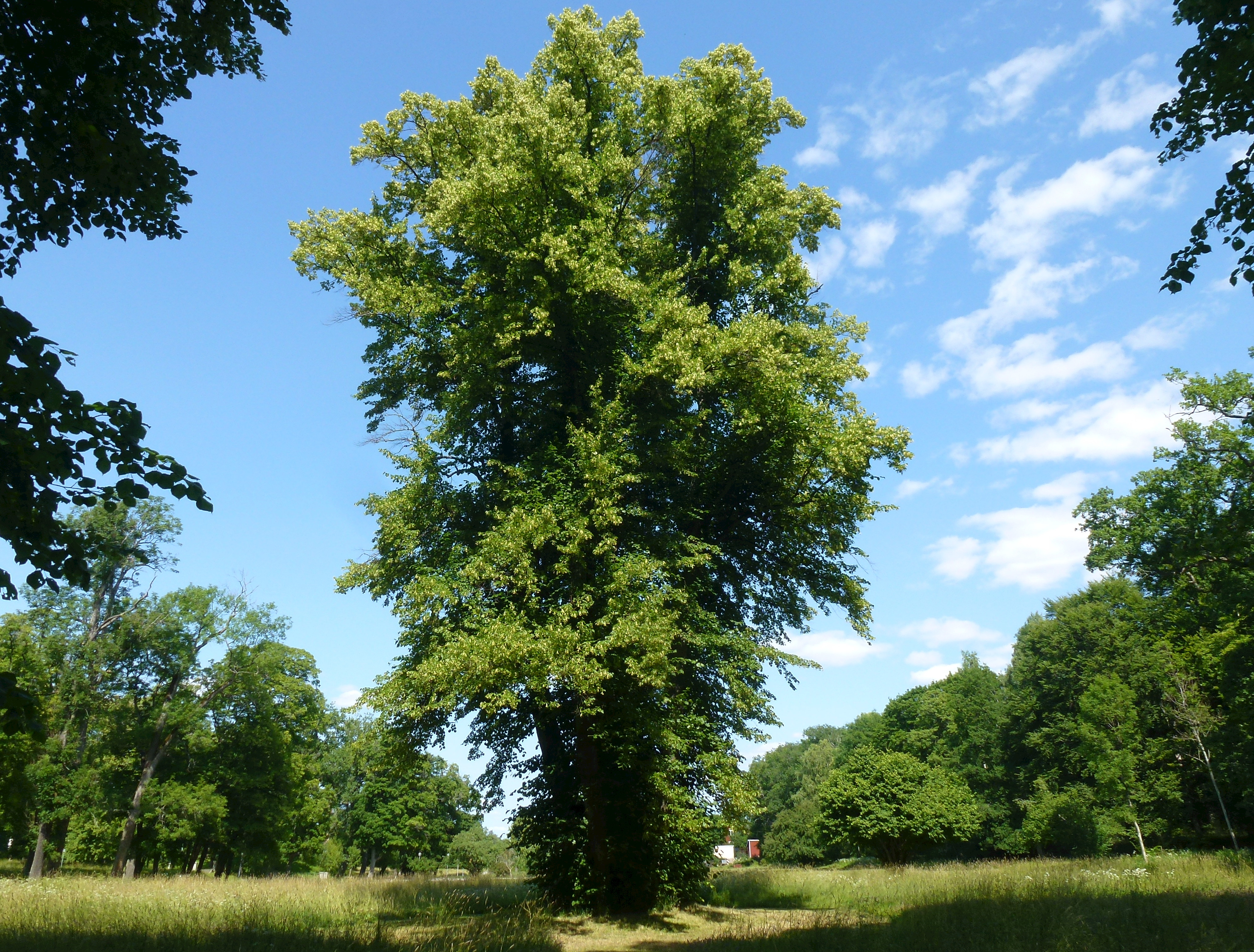
- Tilia × europaea, the type species of the genus, in Kungsör, Sweden

Scientific classification
- Kingdom: Plantae
- Clade: Tracheophytes
- Clade: Angiosperms
- Clade: Eudicots
- Clade: Rosids
- Order: Malvales
- Family: Malvaceae
- Subfamily: Tilioideae
- Genus: Tilia; L.

Species
- 32; see text

Synonyms
- Lindnera Fuss; Tilioides Medik.

= Tilia =

Tilia Temporal range: Eocene–Recent

Plant genus

Tilia is a genus of about 30 species of trees or bushes, native throughout most of the temperate Northern Hemisphere. The species are known as linden or lime for the European and Asian species, and linden or basswood for North American species and more generally in American literature. The greatest species diversity is found in Asia, but the genus also occurs widely in Europe and eastern North America. Under the Cronquist classification system, this genus was placed in the family Tiliaceae, but genetic research summarised by the Angiosperm Phylogeny Group has resulted in the incorporation of this genus, and of most of the previous family, into the Malvaceae.

Tilia is the only known ectomycorrhizal genus in the family Malvaceae. Studies of ectomycorrhizal relations of Tilia species indicate a wide range of fungal symbionts and a preference toward Ascomycota fungal partners.

== Description ==
Tilia species are mostly large, deciduous trees, reaching typically 20 to 40 m (65 to 130 ft) tall. As with elms, the exact number of species is uncertain, as many of the species can hybridise readily, both in the wild and in cultivation. They are hermaphroditic, having perfect flowers with both male and female parts, pollinated by insects.

The trunk is stout, with pale grey to brownish-grey bark, smooth at first, becoming coarsely fissured or scaly on older trees; the inner bark, called bast, is soft, but fibrous, with high tensile strength. The wood is white, fairly soft, with minimal wood grain, making it popular for wood carving (see #Wood below).

The leaves of Tilia species are heart-shaped, and most are asymmetrical, with oblique-cordate (heart-shaped) leaves 4 to 20 cm (1 1/2 to 7 3/4 in) across, sometimes more, to 25 cm in the hybrid cultivar Tilia 'Moltkei'. In all species, the leaf margin is toothed, sometimes markedly so, with T. henryana having conspicuous long bristle-like teeth up to 4.4 mm long. In another species, T. mongolica, the leaves are also distinctly three- to five-lobed as one or two pairs of the marginal teeth are larger than the others; in this species, the leaf base is also usually symmetrical, not oblique as in other limes.

The flowers are small (10–15 mm diameter) and symmetrical, with five sepals and five petals; the petals are yellow to greenish-yellow, about twice the length of the sepals when fully open; they are strongly scented, and very attractive to bees and other insects. The flowers of European and American Tilia species are similar, except the American ones bear a petal-like scale among their stamens and the European species are devoid of these appendages. The tiny, pea-sized fruit hangs attached to a ribbon-like, greenish-yellow bract whose apparent purpose is to aid the ripened seed clusters to blow in wind to a little beyond the parent tree. The fruit is mostly smooth and variably downy, but in T. chinensis and T. platyphyllos is prominently ribbed, with five ribs. All of the Tilia species may be propagated by cuttings and grafting, as well as by seed. They grow rapidly in rich soil, but are subject to damage by several insects. Tilia is notoriously difficult to propagate from seed unless collected fresh in autumn; if allowed to dry, the seeds go into deep dormancy and take 18 months to germinate.

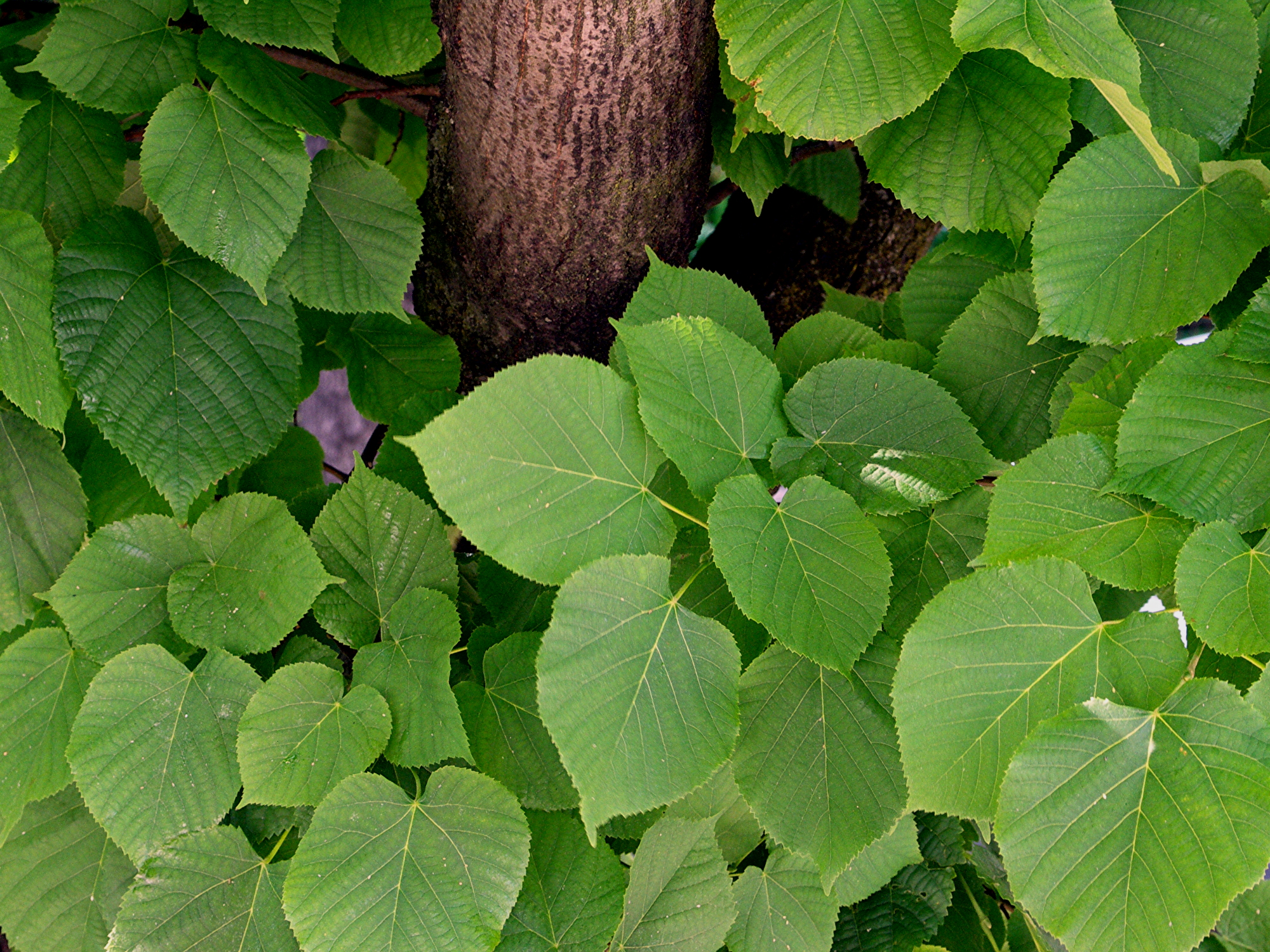
Trunk and leaves

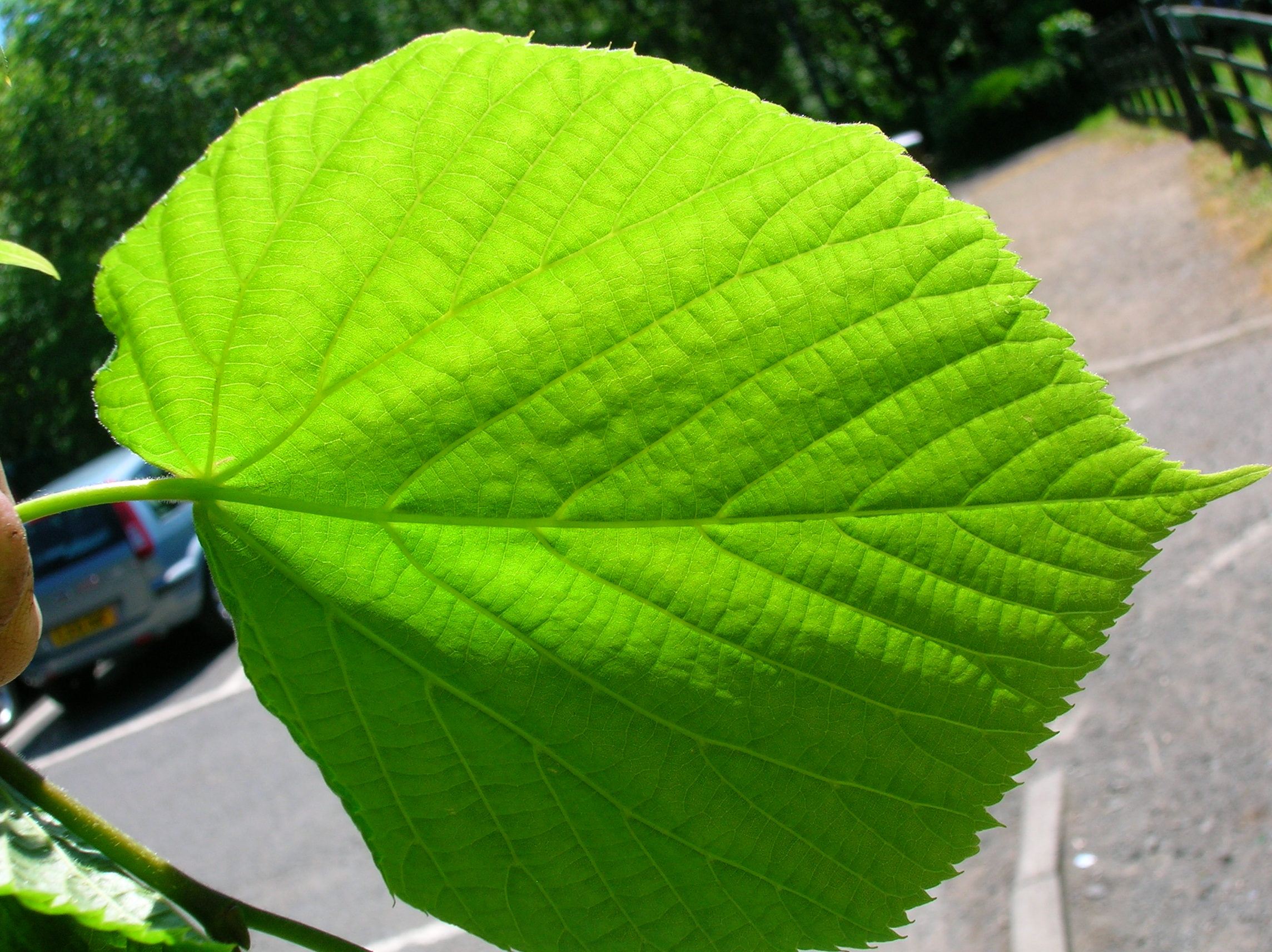
Leaf of common lime (Tilia × europaea) showing venation

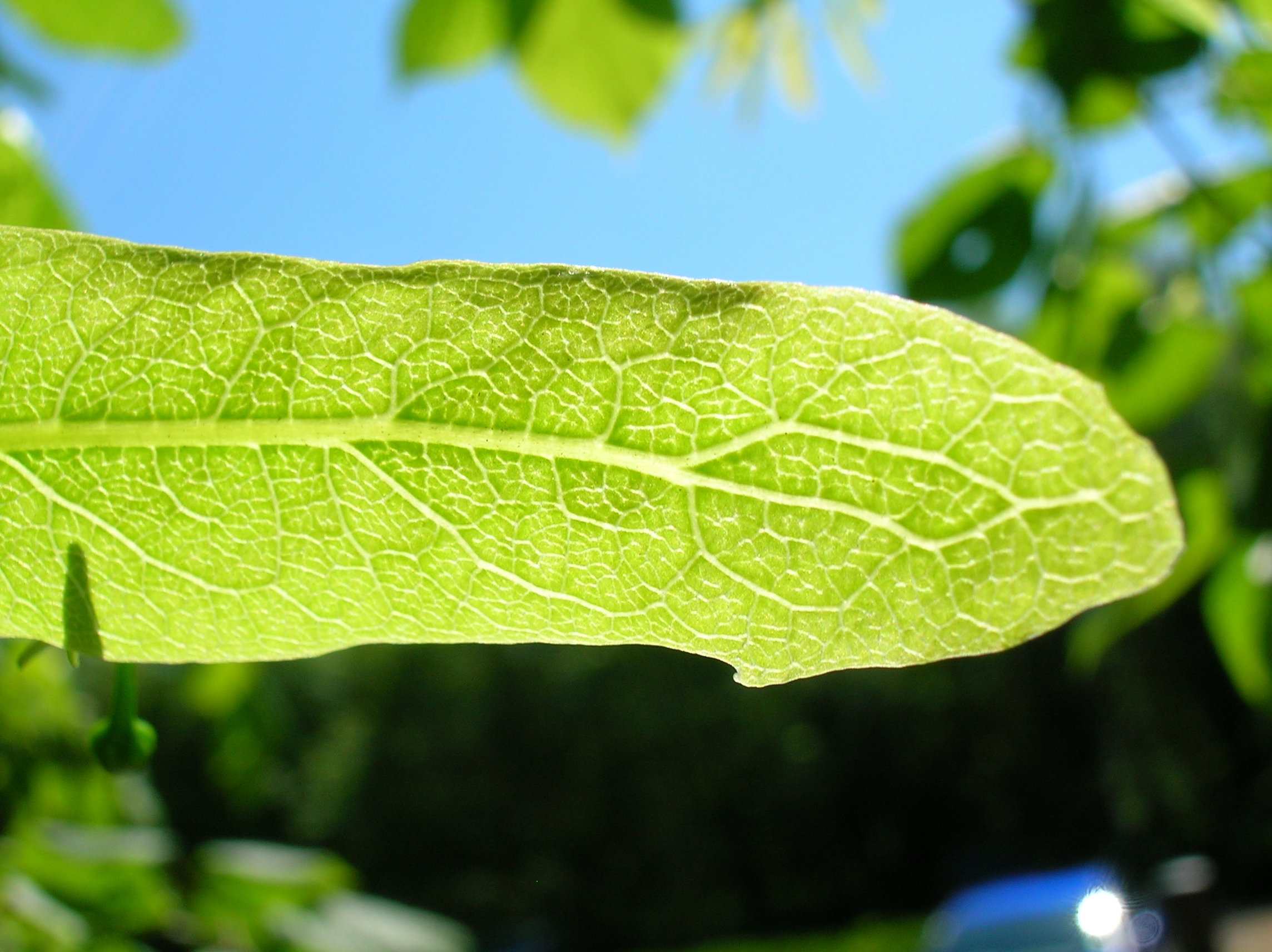
The venation within a Tilia bract

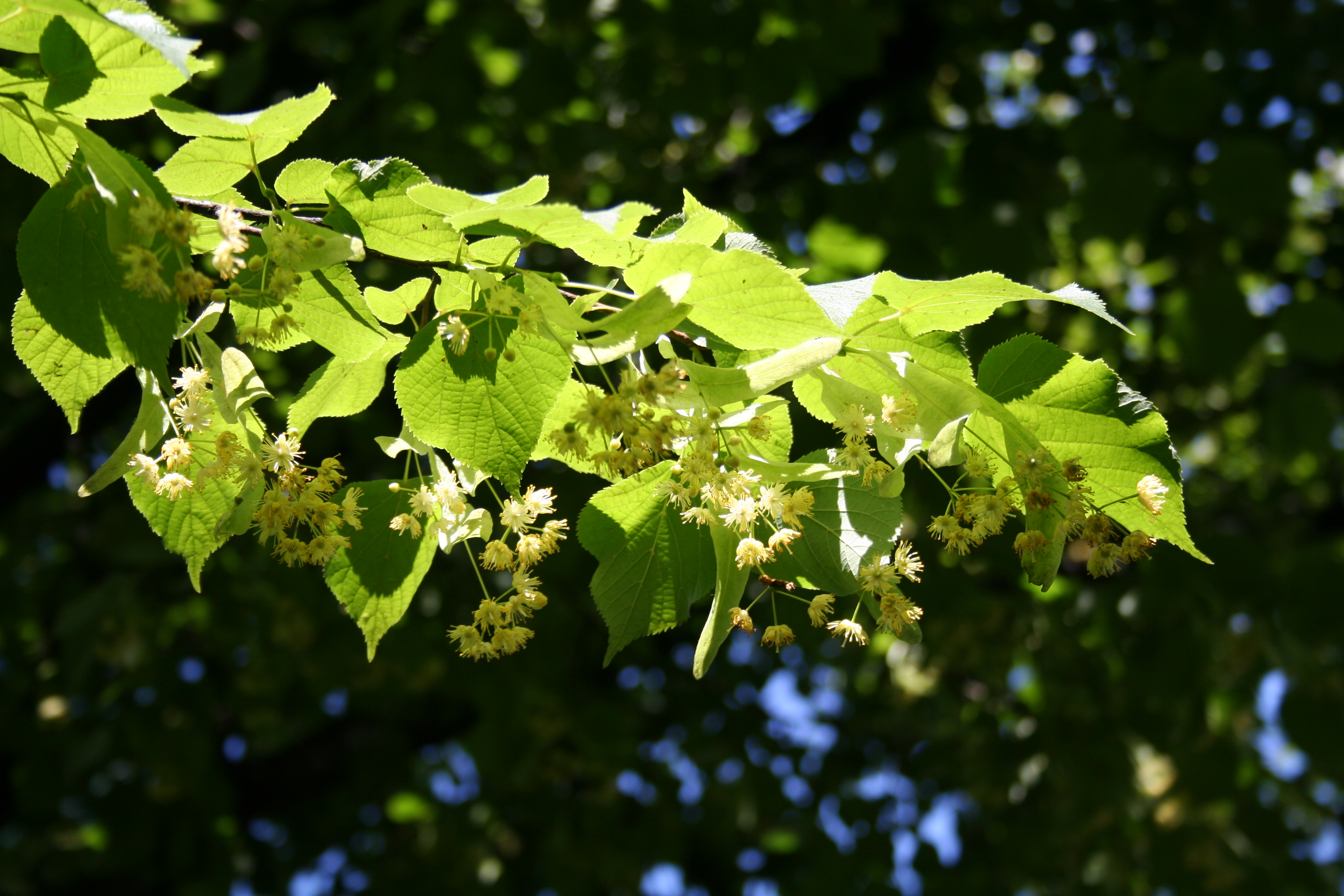
Tilia flowers

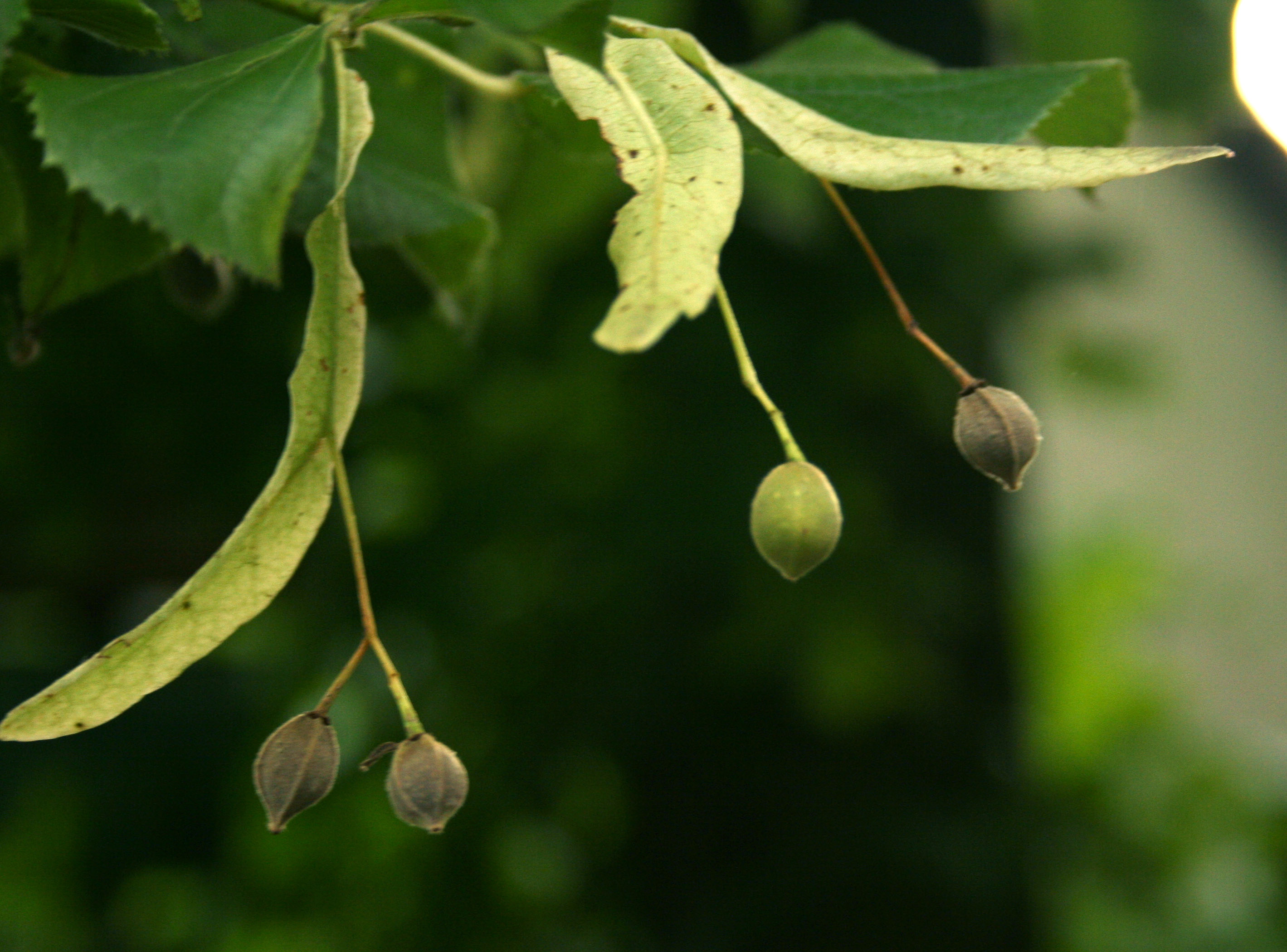
Tilia fruit

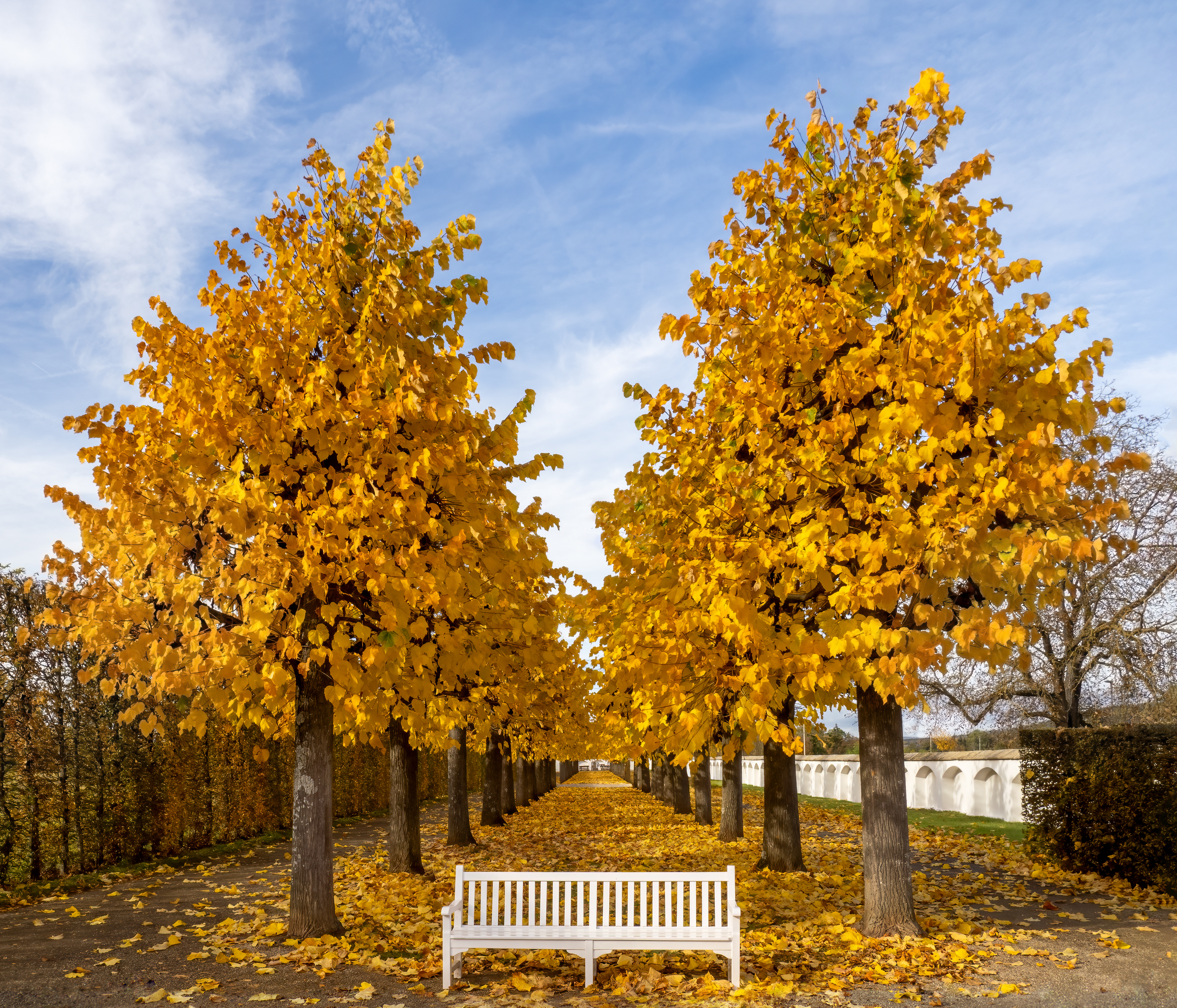
Lime avenue in Germany in autumn

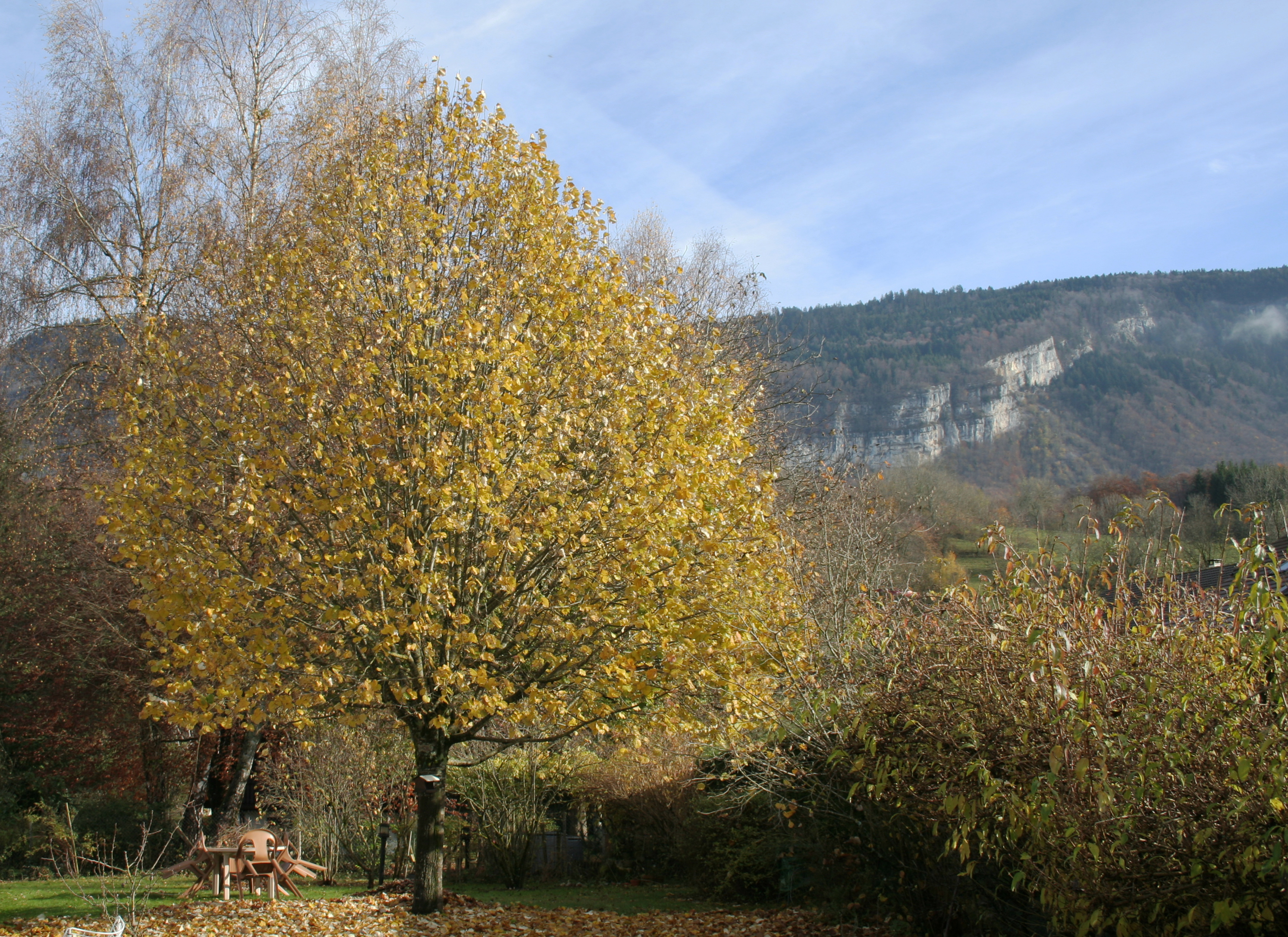
A 15-year-old lime-tree, Haute-Savoie, France

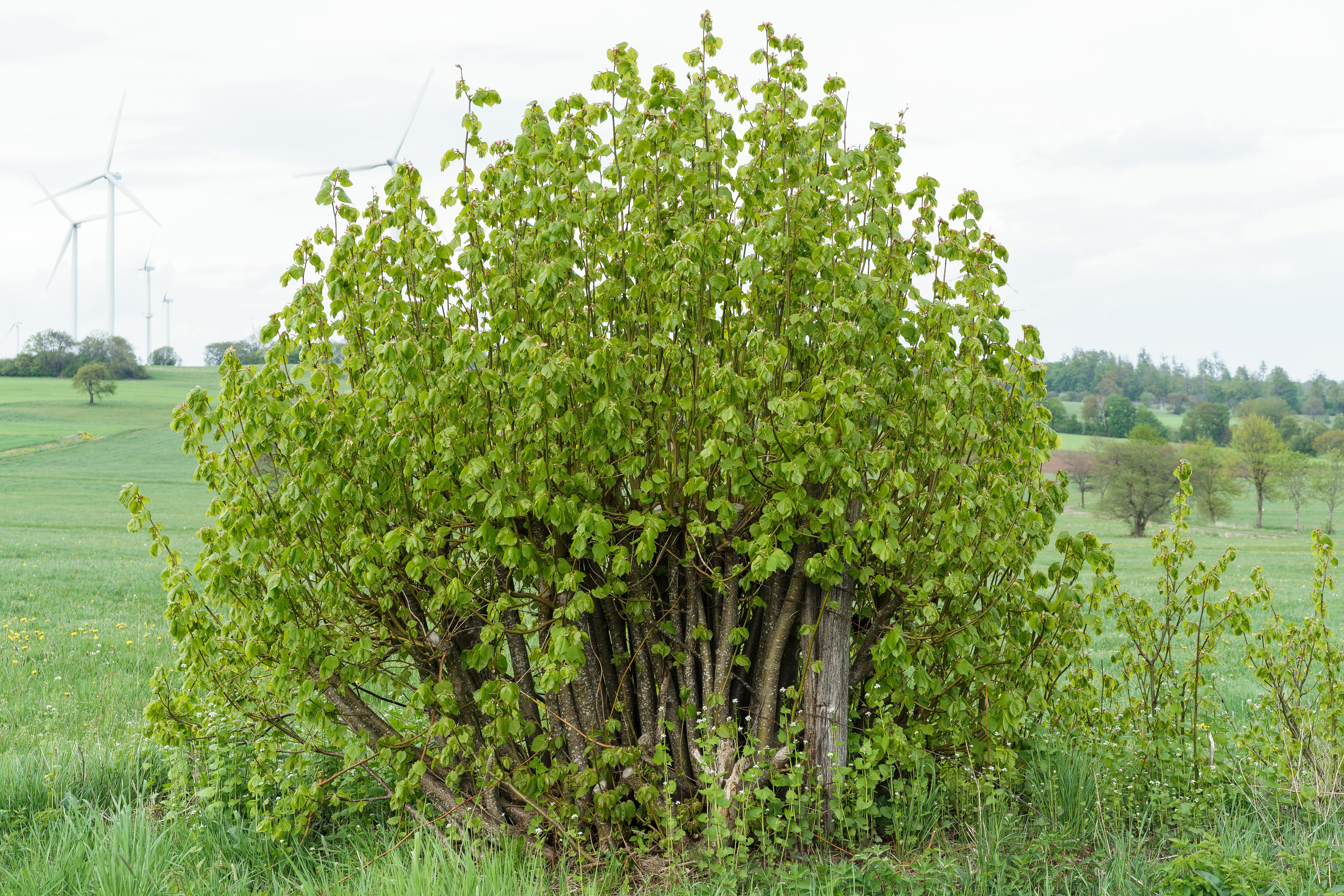
A lime after coppicing, Vogelsberg Mountains

== Taxonomy ==
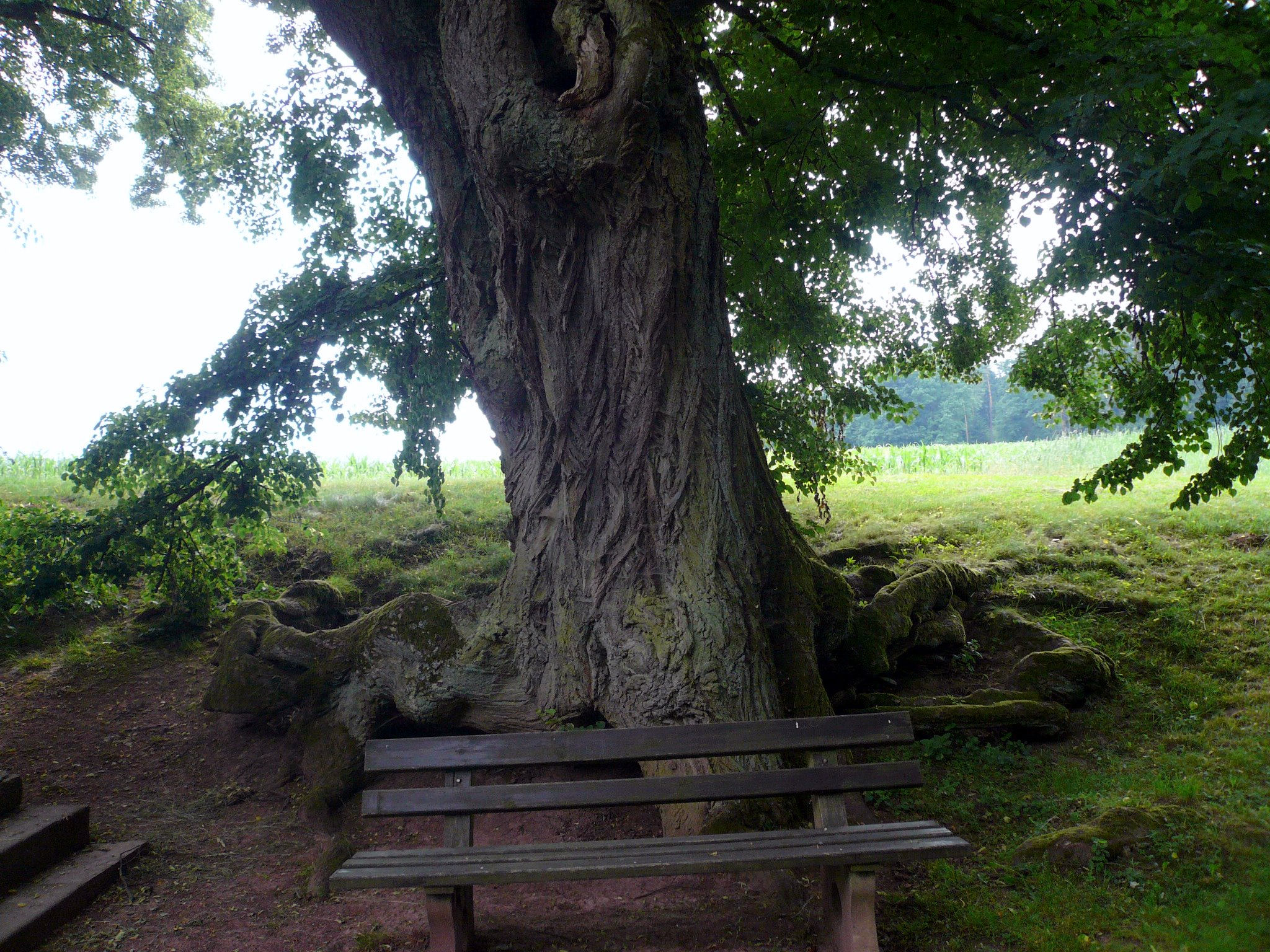
Bole of an ancient Tilia at Frankenbrunn, Bavaria

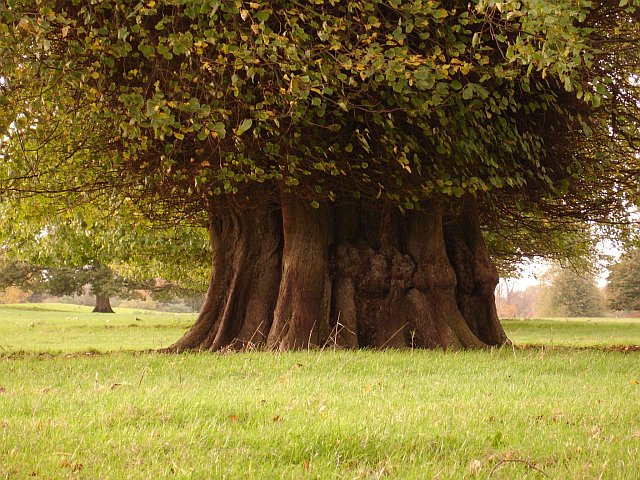
Ancient lime tree at Chilston Park, England

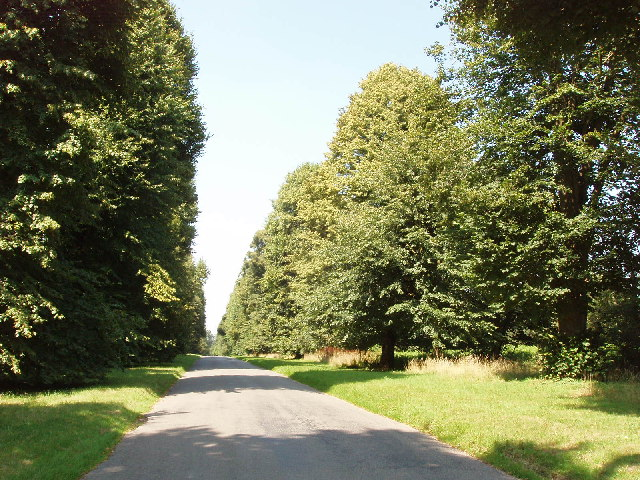
Avenue of lime trees at Turville Heath

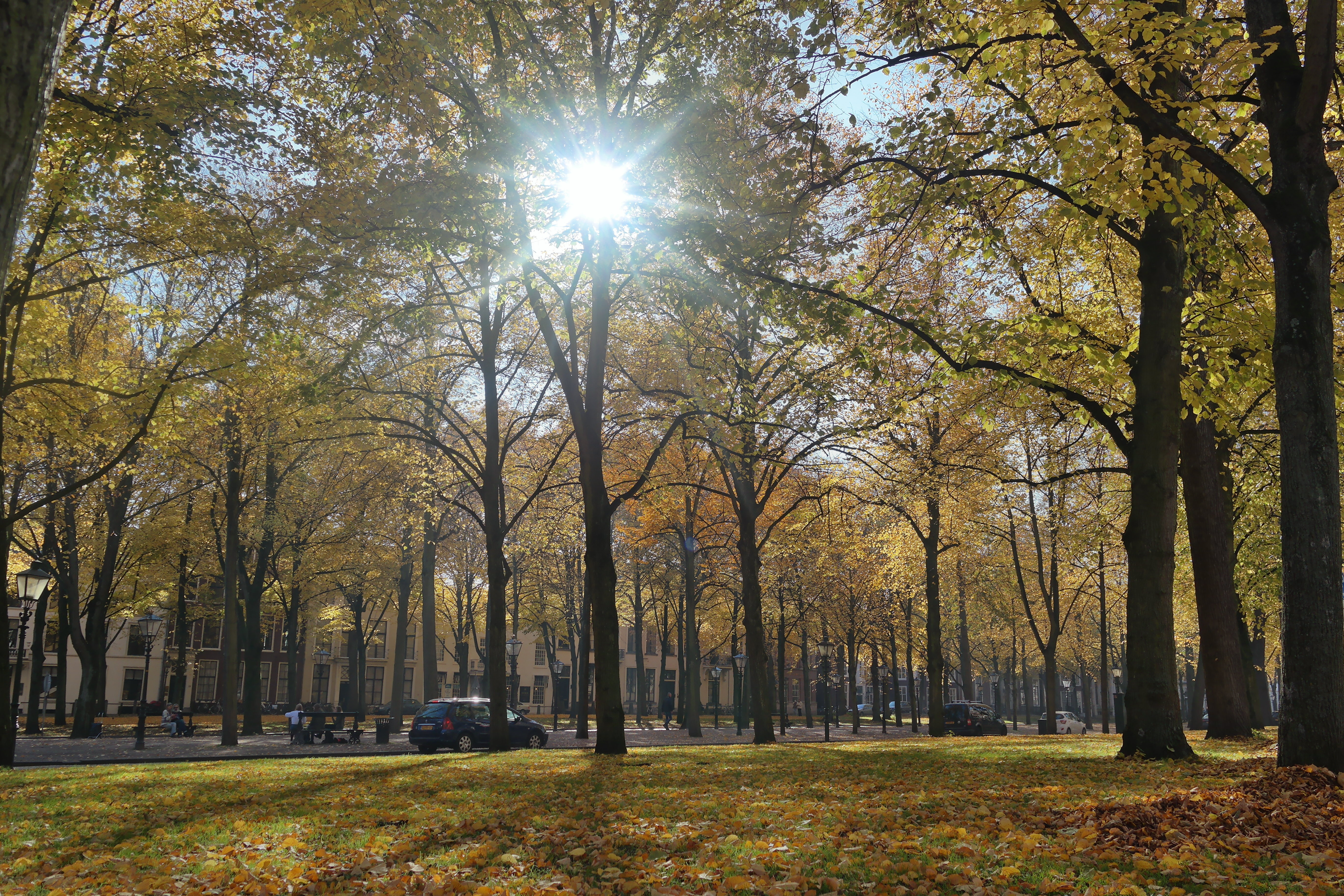
Avenue of lime trees in The Hague

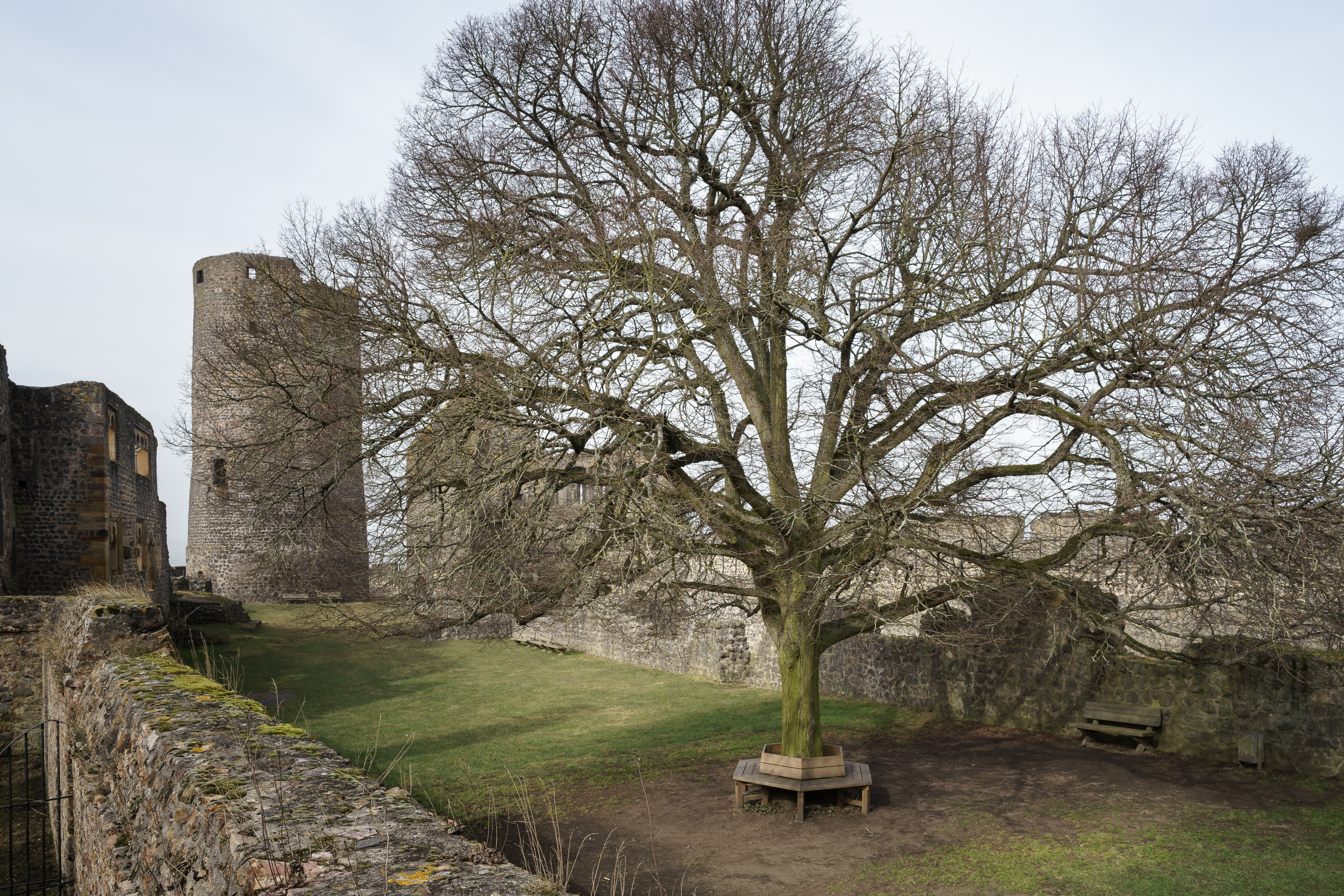
Tilia in the Münzenberg Castle

=== Subdivision ===
==== Species ====
This list comprises the species accepted by the Plants of the World Online (POWO):

- Tilia americana L. – American basswood, American linden
- Tilia amurensis Rupr. – Amur lime, Amur linden
- Tilia callidonta Hung T.Chang
- Tilia chinensis Maxim. – Chinese lime or Chinese linden
- Tilia chingiana Hu & W.C.Cheng
- Tilia concinna Pigott
- Tilia cordata Mill. – small-leaved lime
- Tilia dasystyla Steven
- Tilia endochrysea Hand.-Mazz.
- Tilia henryana Szyszyl. – Henry's lime, Henry's linden
- Tilia hyrcana Tabari & Colagar – Hubei lime
- Tilia japonica (Miq.) Simonk. – Japanese lime, shina (when used as a laminate)
- Tilia jiaodongensis S.B.Liang
- Tilia kiusiana Makino & Shiras.
- Tilia kueichouensis Hu
- Tilia likiangensis Hung T.Chang
- Tilia mandshurica Rupr. & Maxim. – Manchurian lime
- Tilia maximowicziana Shiras.
- Tilia membranacea Hung T.Chang
- Tilia mexicana Schltdl.
- Tilia miqueliana Maxim.
- Tilia mongolica Maxim. – Mongolian lime, Mongolian linden
- Tilia nobilis Rehder & E.H.Wilson – noble lime
- Tilia occidentalisibirica Charit.
- Tilia oliveri Szyszył. – Oliver's lime
- Tilia paucicostata Maxim.
- Tilia platyphyllos Scop. – large-leaved lime
- Tilia sabetii H.Zare
- Tilia stellatopilosa Zare, Amini & Assadi
- Tilia toboliensis Charit.
- Tilia tomentosa Moench – silver lime
- Tilia tuan Szyszyl.

The following additional species have been accepted by some other sources:

- Tilia caroliniana – Carolina basswood (included in T. americana by POWO; accepted by Pigott)
- Tilia hupehensis (included in T. tuan by POWO and Pigott)
- Tilia nasczokinii (included in T. cordata by POWO and Pigott)

==== Hybrids ====
These natural hybrids are also accepted by POWO:

- Tilia × cinerascens (Rehder & E.H.Wilson) Pigott (T. oliveri × T. chingiana)
- Tilia × euchlora L. (T. dasystyla × T. cordata)
- Tilia × europaea K.Koch (T. cordata × T. platyphyllos; syn. T. × vulgaris) – Common lime
- Tilia × haynaldiana Simonk. (T. platyphyllos × T. tomentosa)
- Tilia × juranyiana Simonk. (T. cordata × T. tomentosa)
- Tilia × noziricola Hisauti (T. japonica × T. maximowicziana)

==== Extinct species ====
- †Tilia johnsoni Wolfe & Wehr Eocene; Washington and British Columbia

==== Selected cultivars ====
- Tilia 'Flavescens' – Glenleven linden (T. americana × T. cordata)
- Tilia 'Moltkei' (T. americana × T. petiolaris)
- Tilia 'Orbicularis' (hybrid, unknown origin)
- Tilia 'Petiolaris' (T. tomentosa)
- Tilia 'Spectabilis' (hybrid, unknown origin)

=== Etymology ===
The Latin tilia is cognate to Greek πτελέᾱ, ptelea, "elm tree", τιλίαι, tiliai, "black poplar" (Hes.), ultimately from a Proto-Indo-European word *ptel-ei̯ā with a meaning of "broad" (feminine); perhaps "broad-leaved" or similar.

The genus is generally called "lime" in Britain and "linden", or "basswood" in North America.

"Lime" is an altered form of Middle English lind, in the 16th century also line, from Old English feminine lind or linde, Proto-Germanic *lindō (cf. Dutch/German Linde, plural Linden), cognate to Latin lentus "flexible" and Sanskrit latā "liana". Within Germanic languages, English "lithe" and Dutch/German lind for "lenient, yielding" are from the same root.

"Linden" was originally the adjective, "made from linwood or lime-wood" (equivalent to "wooden" or "oaken"); from the late 16th century, "linden" was also used as a noun, probably influenced by translations of German romance, as an adoption of Linden, the plural of Linde in Dutch and German. Neither the name nor the tree is related to Citrus genus species and hybrids that go by the same name, such as Key limes (Citrus × aurantifolia). Another common name used in North America is basswood, derived from bast, the name for the inner bark (see Uses, below). Teil is an old name for the lime tree.

== Ecology ==
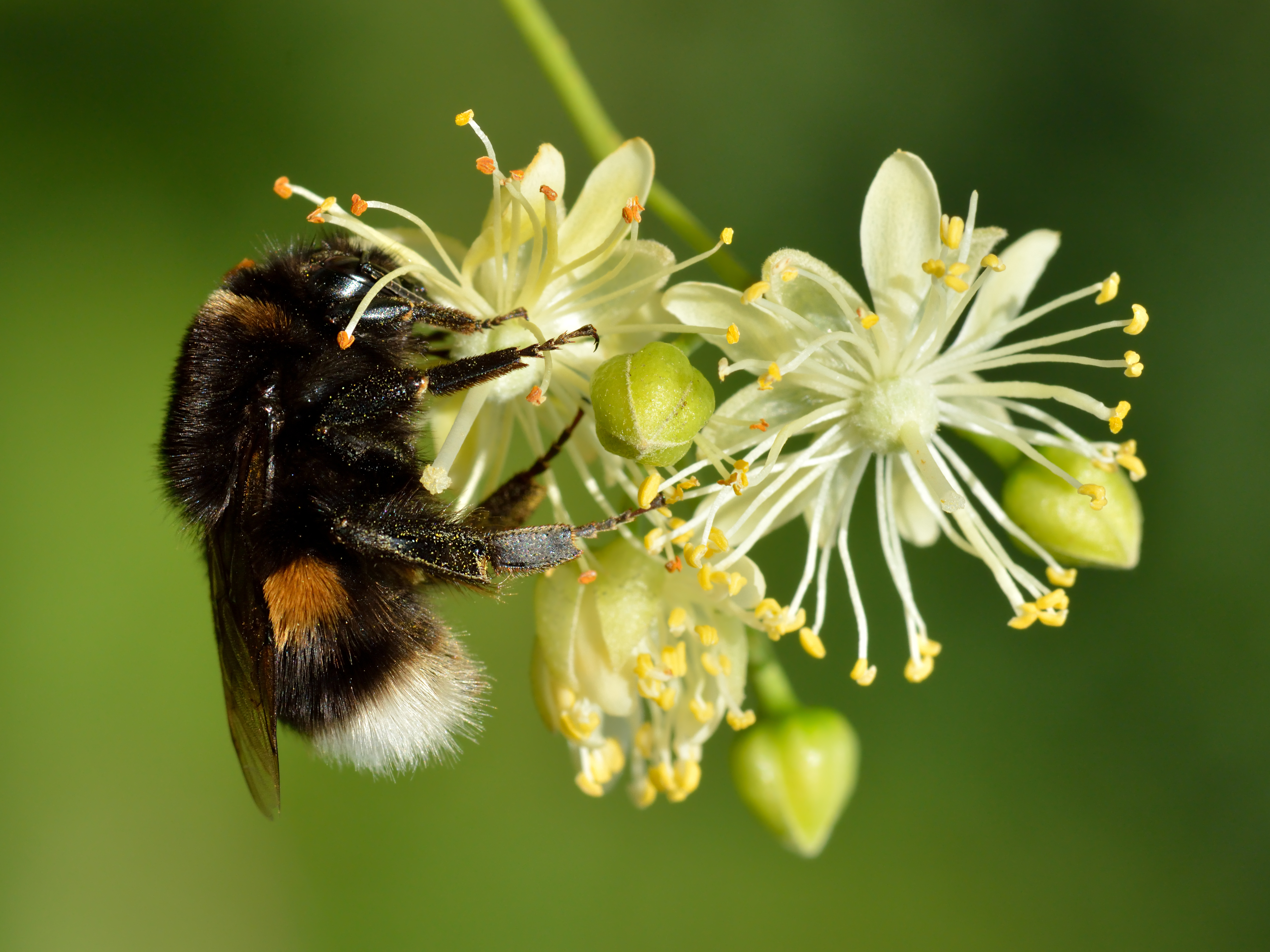
Bombus terrestris on Tilia cordata

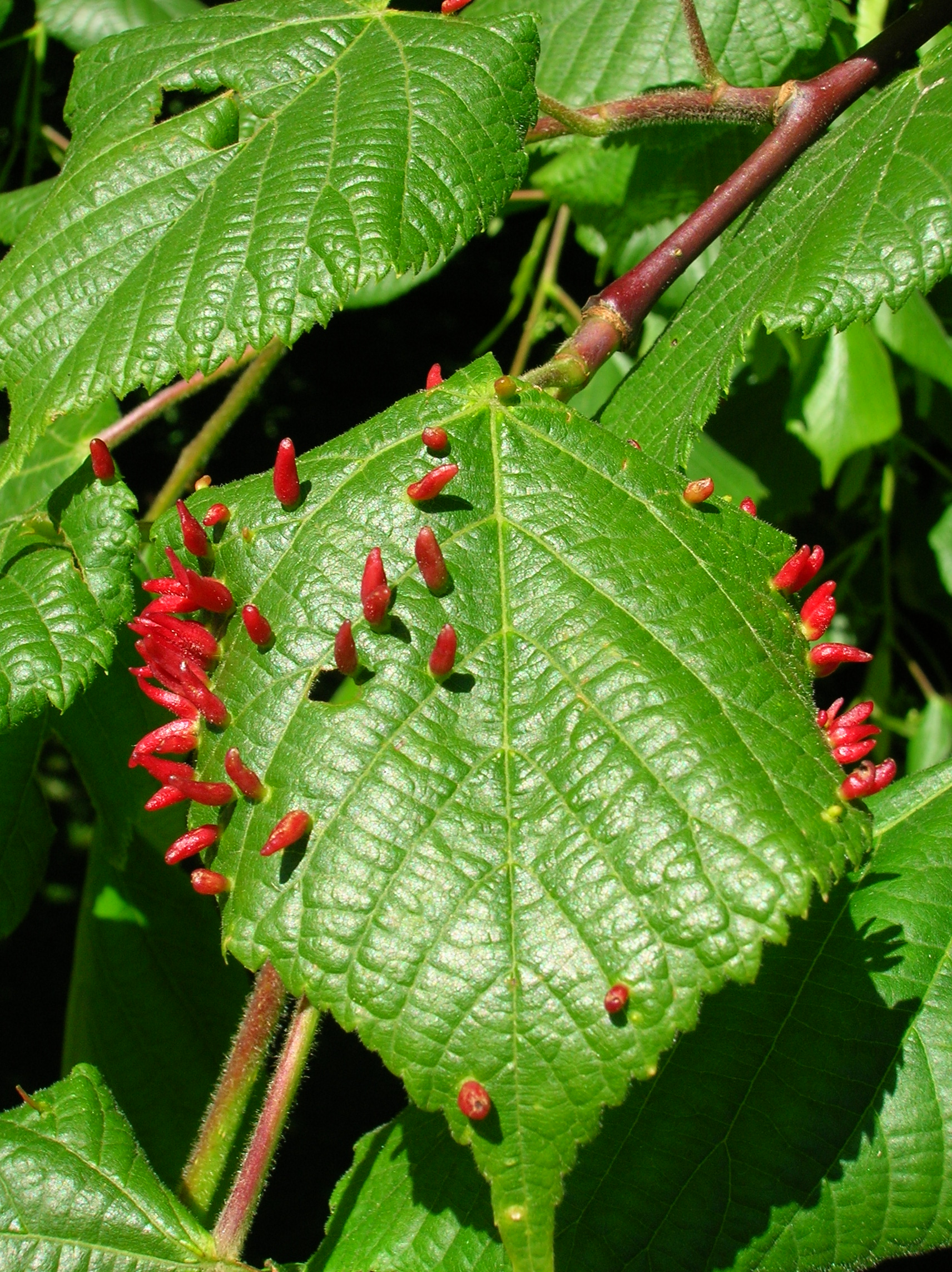
Linden nail galls, caused by the mite Eriophyes tiliae

Aphids are attracted by the rich supply of sap, and are in turn often "farmed" by ants for the production of the honeydew (an aphid waste product), which the ants collect for their own use, and the result can often be a dripping of excess sap onto the lower branches and leaves, and anything else below. Cars left under the trees can quickly become coated with a film of the syrup ("honeydew") thus dropped from higher up. The ant/aphid "farming" process does not appear to cause any serious damage to the trees.

== Uses ==
Limes are widely used as ornamental trees when a mass of foliage or a deep shade is desired. It produces fragrant and nectar-producing flowers and is an important honey plant for beekeepers, giving rise to a pale but richly flavoured monofloral honey. In European and North American herbal medicine, the flowers are also used for herbal teas and tinctures. The flowers are used for herbal tea in the winter in the Balkans. In China, dried Tilia flowers are also used to make tea.

In English landscape gardens, avenues of linden trees were fashionable, especially during the late 17th and early 18th centuries. Many country houses have a surviving "lime avenue" or "lime walk", the example at Hatfield House was planted between 1700 and 1730. The fashion was derived from the earlier practice of planting lindens in lines as shade trees in Germany, the Netherlands, Belgium, and northern France. Most of the trees used in British gardens were cultivars propagated by layering in the Netherlands.

=== Wood ===
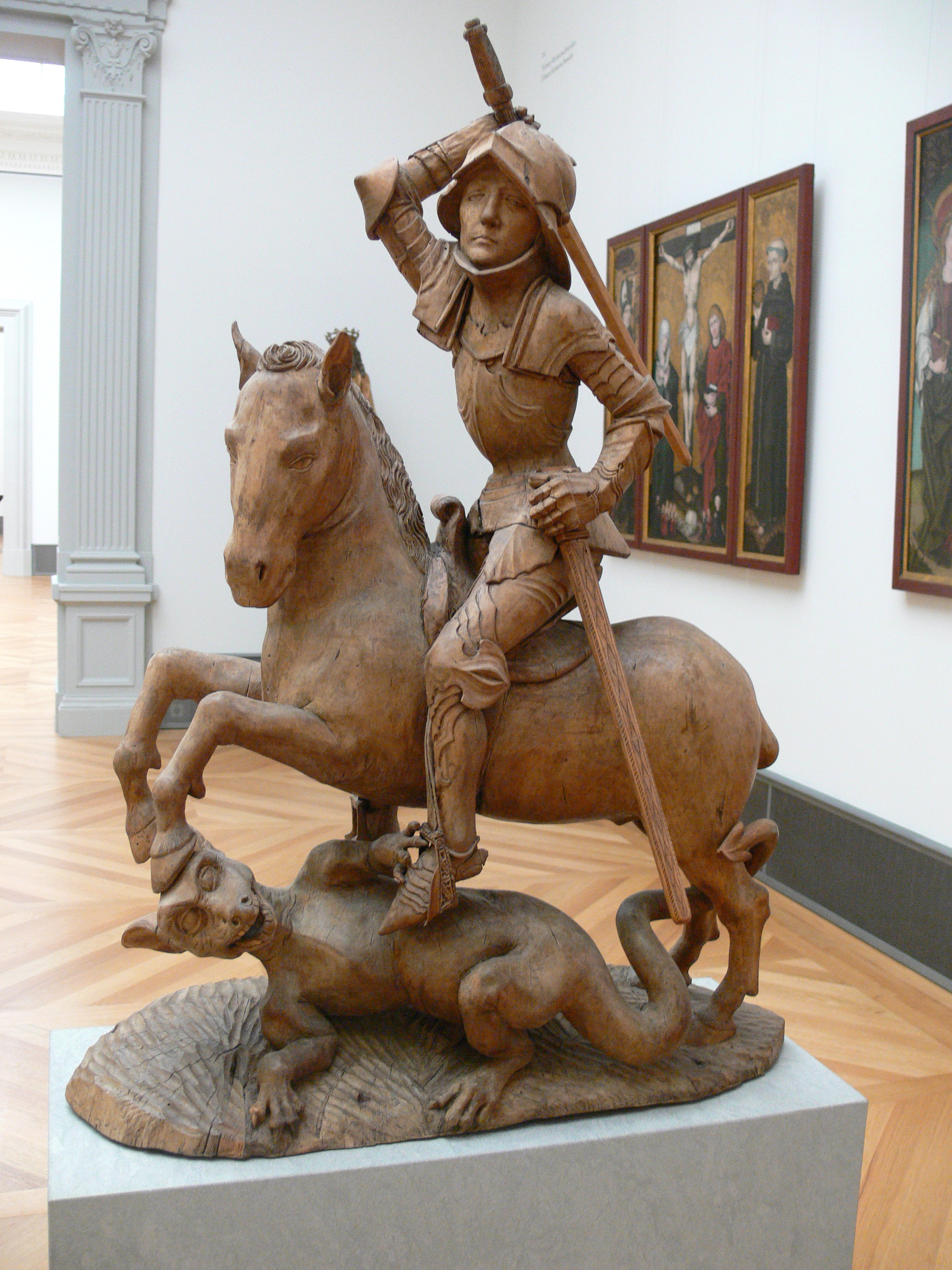
Limewood Saint George by Tilman Riemenschneider, circa 1490

Linden trees produce soft and easily worked timber, which has very little grain and a density of 560 kg/m^{3}. It was often used by Germanic tribes for constructing shields. It is a popular wood for model building and for intricate carving. Especially in Germany, it was the classic wood for sculpture from the Middle Ages onwards and is the material for the elaborate altarpieces of Veit Stoss, Tilman Riemenschneider, and many others. In England, it was the favoured medium of sculptor Grinling Gibbons (1648–1721). The wood is used in marionette- and puppet-making and -carving. Having a fine, light grain and being comparatively light in weight, it has been used for centuries for this purpose; despite the availability of modern alternatives, it remains one of the main materials used as of 2015. In China, it was also widely used in carving or furniture, interior decorating, handicrafts, etc.

Ease of working and good acoustic properties also make limewood popular for electric and bass guitar bodies and for wind instruments such as recorders. Percussion manufacturers sometimes use Tilia as a material for drum shells, both to enhance their sound and for their aesthetics.

Linden wood is also the material of choice for window blinds and shutters. Real-wood blinds are often made from this lightweight but strong and stable wood, which is well suited to natural and stained finishes.

In China, 冻蘑/"dongmo" grows well on decomposing logs of Tilia trees in the old-growth forest; therefore, people use logs of Tilia trees to cultivate S. edulis and even black fungus or shiitake mushrooms with excellent results. Currently, "椴木黑木耳/Tilia-logs-black fungus" or "椴木香菇/Tilia-logs-shiitake mushrooms" has become a term for a method of cultivating black fungus and shiitake mushrooms and "椴木/Tilia-logs" no longer exclusively refers to Tilia tree wood but also to other woods suitable for black fungus or shiitake mushrooms cultivation.

In Russian, "linden-made" (липовый, lipoviy) is a term for forgery, due to the popularity of the material for making forged seals in the past centuries.

=== Bark ===
Known in the trade as basswood, particularly in North America, its name originates from the inner fibrous bark of the tree, known as bast. A strong fibre is obtained from the tree by peeling off the bark and soaking it in water for a month, after which the inner fibres can be easily separated. Bast obtained from the inside of the bark of the Tilia japonica tree has been used by the Ainu people of Japan to weave their traditional clothing, the attus. Excavations in Britain have shown that lime tree fibre was preferred for clothing there during the Bronze Age. The Manchu people in the mountains of Northeast China made ropes, baskets, raincoats, large fishing nets, and guide lines for gunpowder from the bast. Similar fibres obtained from other plants are also called bast: see Bast fibre.

=== Nectar ===
Tilia is a high-quality wild honey plant. In China, "椴树蜜/Tilia honey" is produced in the northeast region. White in color, it is called "white honey" or "snow honey". Heilongjiang is well-known throughout the country for producing high-quality "Tilia honey": Heilongjiang not only has lush Tilia trees, but also a rare and excellent bee species - "东北黑蜂/northeast black bee" to collect honey（Raohe County is the location of the national "东北黑蜂自然保护区/Northeast Black Bee Nature Reserve". It is the only nature reserve for bees in Asia.). "Tilia honey" mainly comes from Tilia amurensis and Tilia mandshurica. "Tilia honey" and southern "longan honey" and "lychee honey" are called "China's three famous honeys". "Tilia honey", "rape honey" and "black acacia honey" are the three most productive honeys in China.

=== Phytochemicals ===
The dried flowers are mildly sweet and sticky, and the fruit is somewhat sweet and mucilaginous. Linden flower tea has a pleasing taste, due to the aromatic volatile oil found in the flowers. Phytochemicals in the Tilia flowers include flavonoids and tannins with astringent properties.

The nectar contains a major secondary metabolite with the trivial name tiliaside (1-[4-(1-hydroxy-1-methylethyl)-1,3-cyclohexadiene-1-carboxylate]-6-O-β-D-glucopyranosyl-β-D-glucopyranose), which is transformed in the gut of bumblebees to the aglycone (i.e., the gentiobiose group is cleaved), which is bioactive against a common and debilitating gut parasite of bumblebees, Crithidia bombi. This naturally occurring compound may support bees to manage the burden of disease — one of the major contributors to pollinator decline.

=== Other uses ===
A beverage made from dried linden leaves and flowers is brewed and consumed as a folk medicine and relaxant in many Eastern European countries. The double-flowered species are used to make perfumes. The leaf buds and young leaves are also edible raw.

Tilia species are used as food plants by the larvae of some Lepidoptera; see List of Lepidoptera that feed on Tilia.

Linden trees are often planted as ornamentals, and are noted for their distinctive fragrance.

== In culture ==
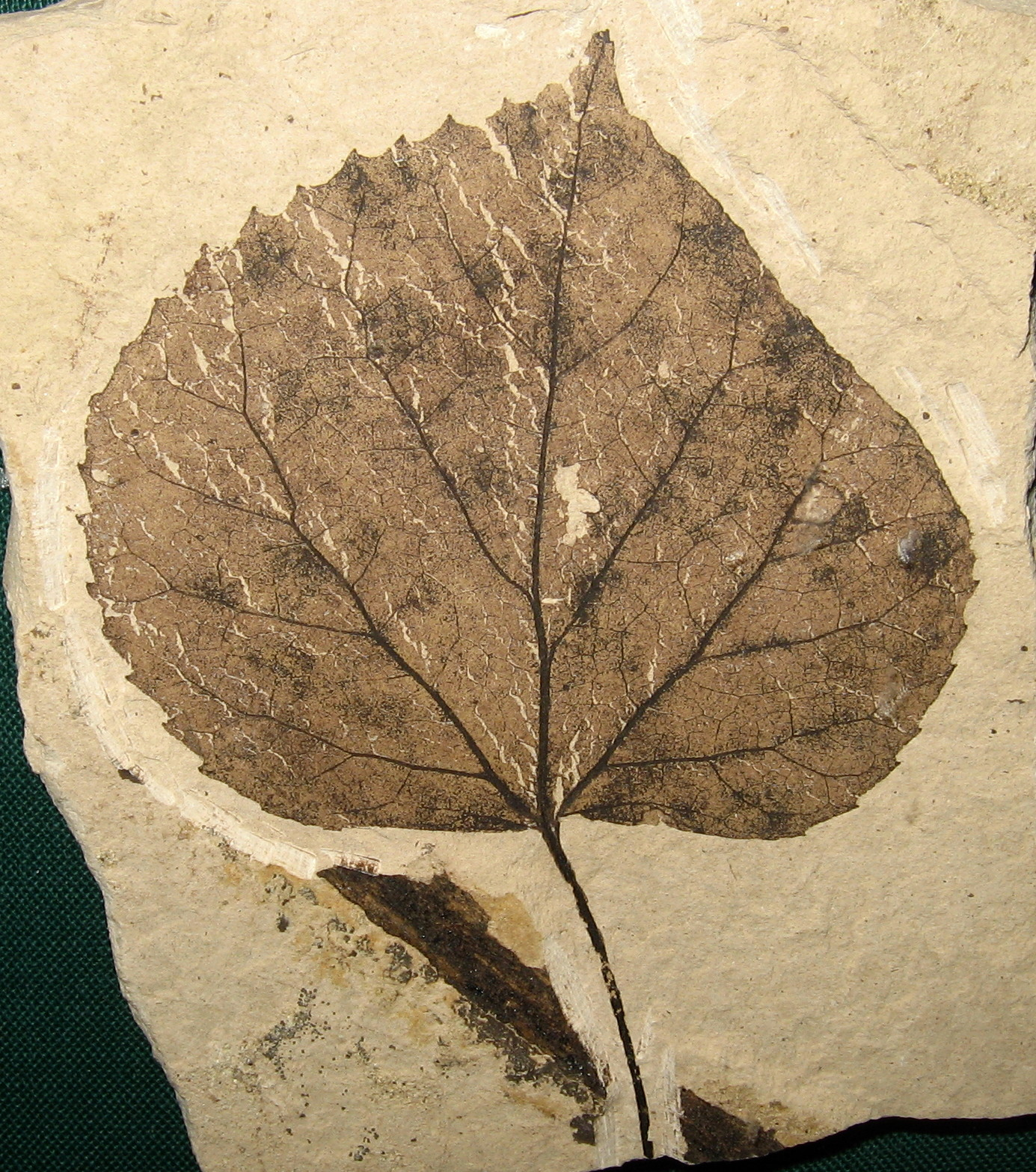
T. johnsoni leaf fossil, 49 Ma, Washington state

In Europe, some linden trees reached considerable ages. A coppice of T. cordata in Westonbirt Arboretum in Gloucestershire is estimated to be 2,000 years old. In the courtyard of the Imperial Castle at Nuremberg is a Tilia, which by tradition recounted in 1900, was planted by the Empress Cunigunde, the wife of Henry II of Germany circa 1000. The Tilia of Neuenstadt am Kocher in Baden-Württemberg, Germany, was estimated at 1000 years old when it fell. The Alte Linde tree of Naters, Switzerland, is mentioned in a document in 1357 and described by the writer at that time as already magnam (large). A plaque at its foot mentions that in 1155, a linden tree was already on this spot. The Najevnik linden tree (Slovene: Najevska lipa), a 700-year-old T. cordata, is the thickest tree in Slovenia. Next to the 英華殿/Yinghua Temple in the Forbidden City in Beijing, there are two Tilia trees planted by Empress Dowager Li, the biological mother of the Wanli Emperor about five hundred years ago.

- The excellence of the honey of the far-famed Hyblaean Mountains was due to the linden trees that covered its sides and crowned its summit.
- Lime fossils have been found in the Tertiary formations of Grinnell Land, Canada, at 82°N latitude, and in Svalbard, Norway. Sapporta believed he had found there the common ancestor of the Tilia species of Europe and America.

== Gallery ==
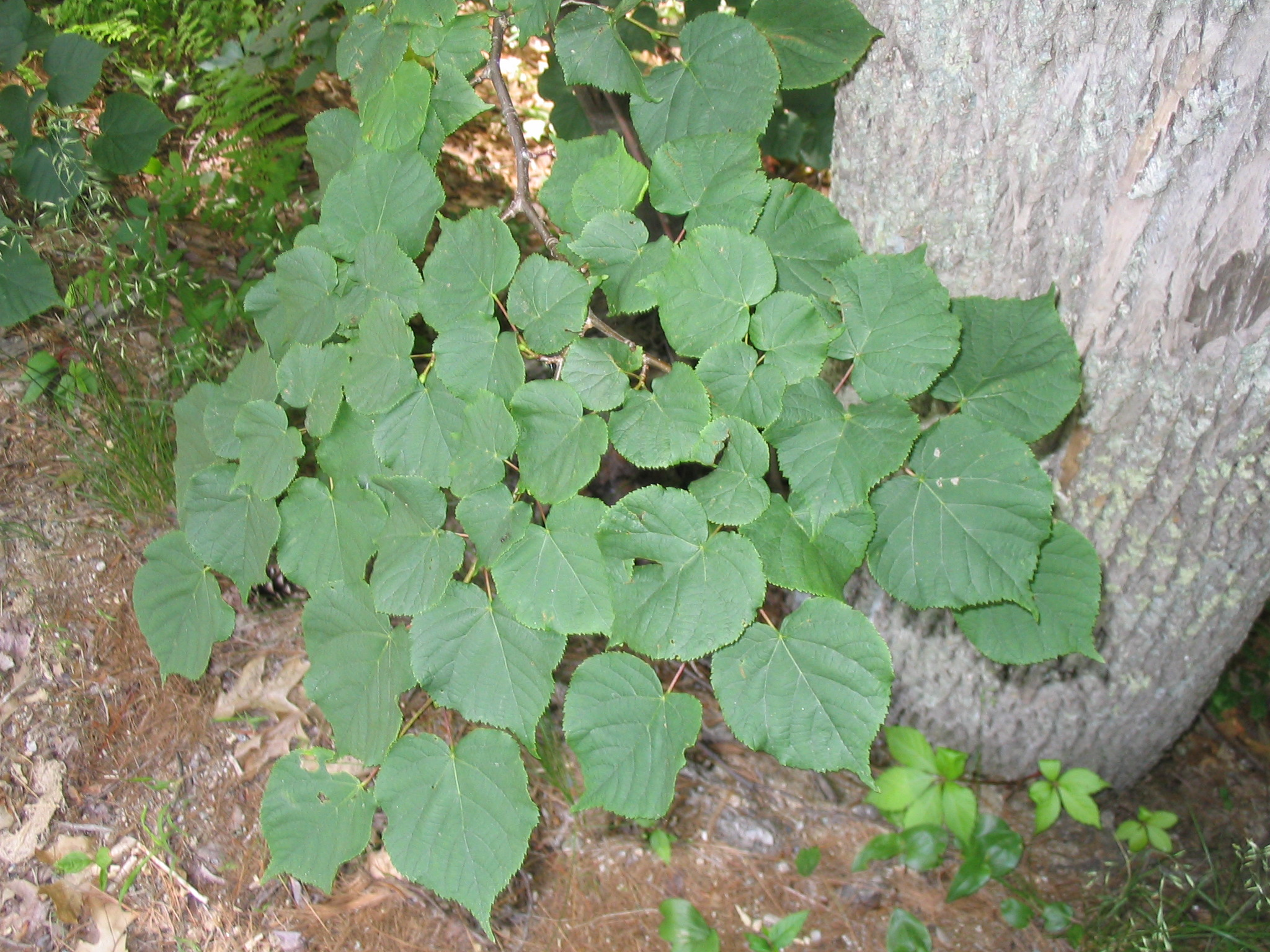
Tilia americana

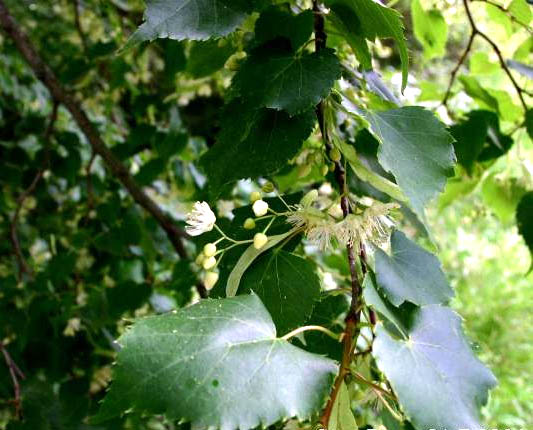
Tilia cordata

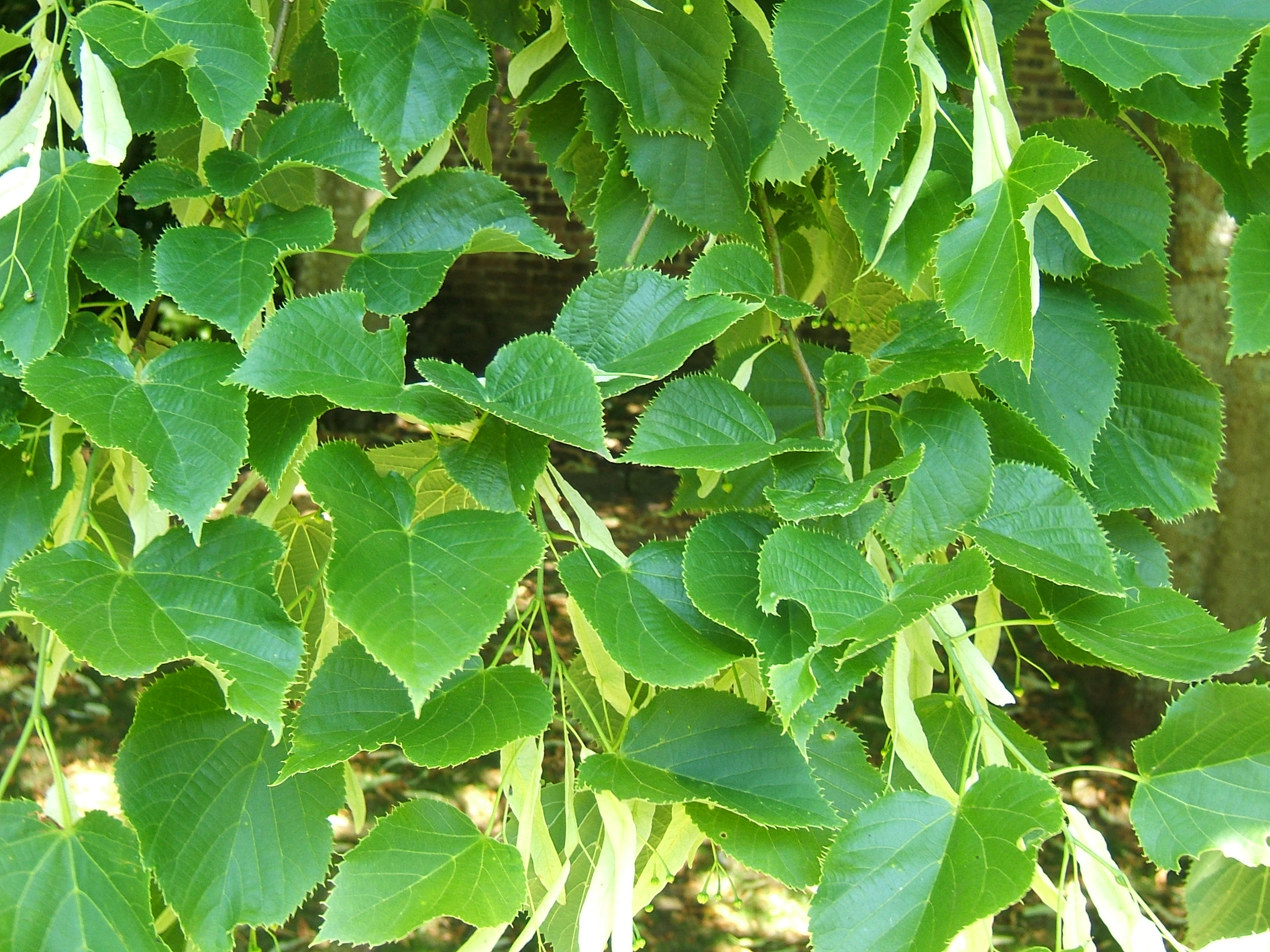
Tilia henryana

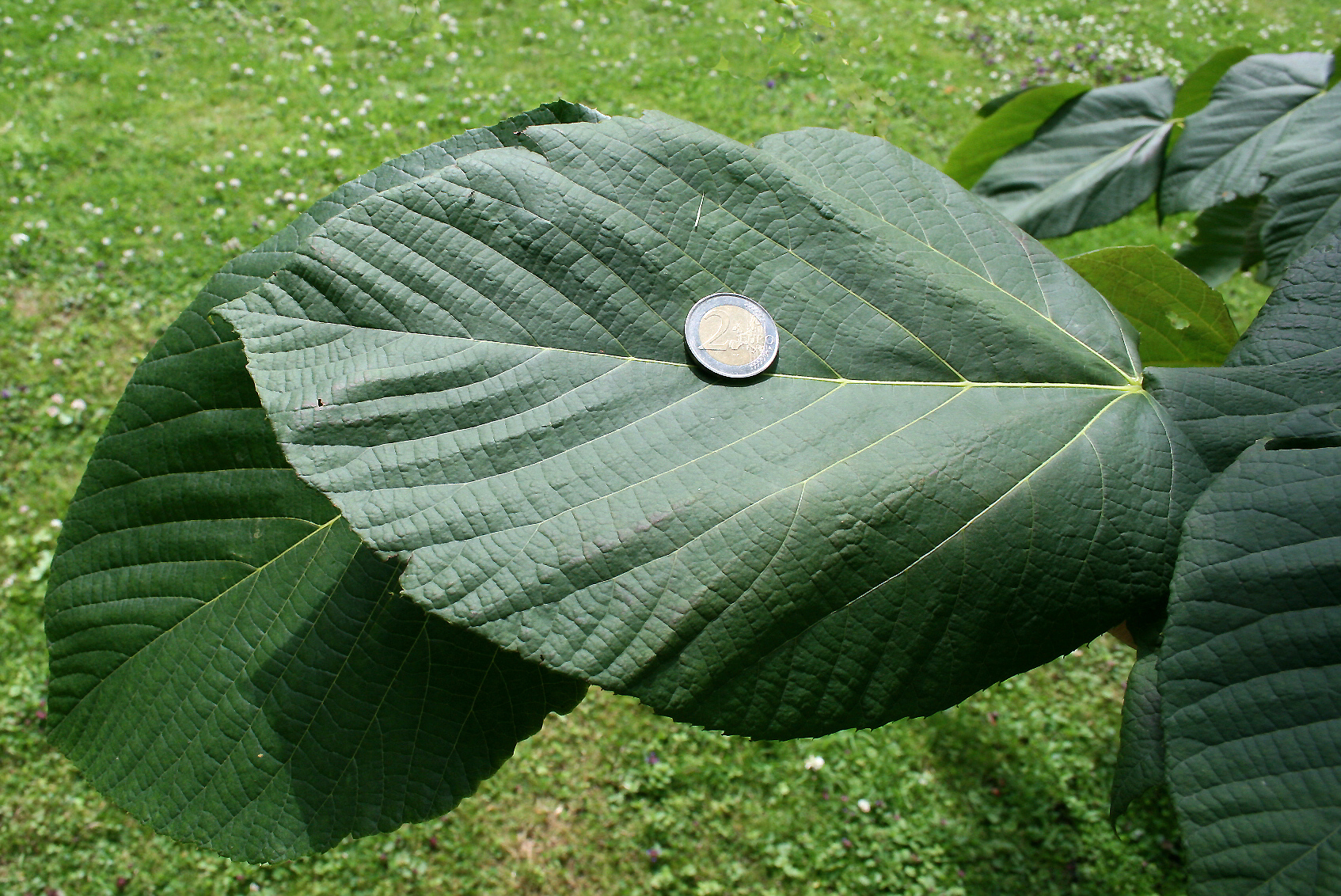
Tilia heterophylla (syn. T. monticola)

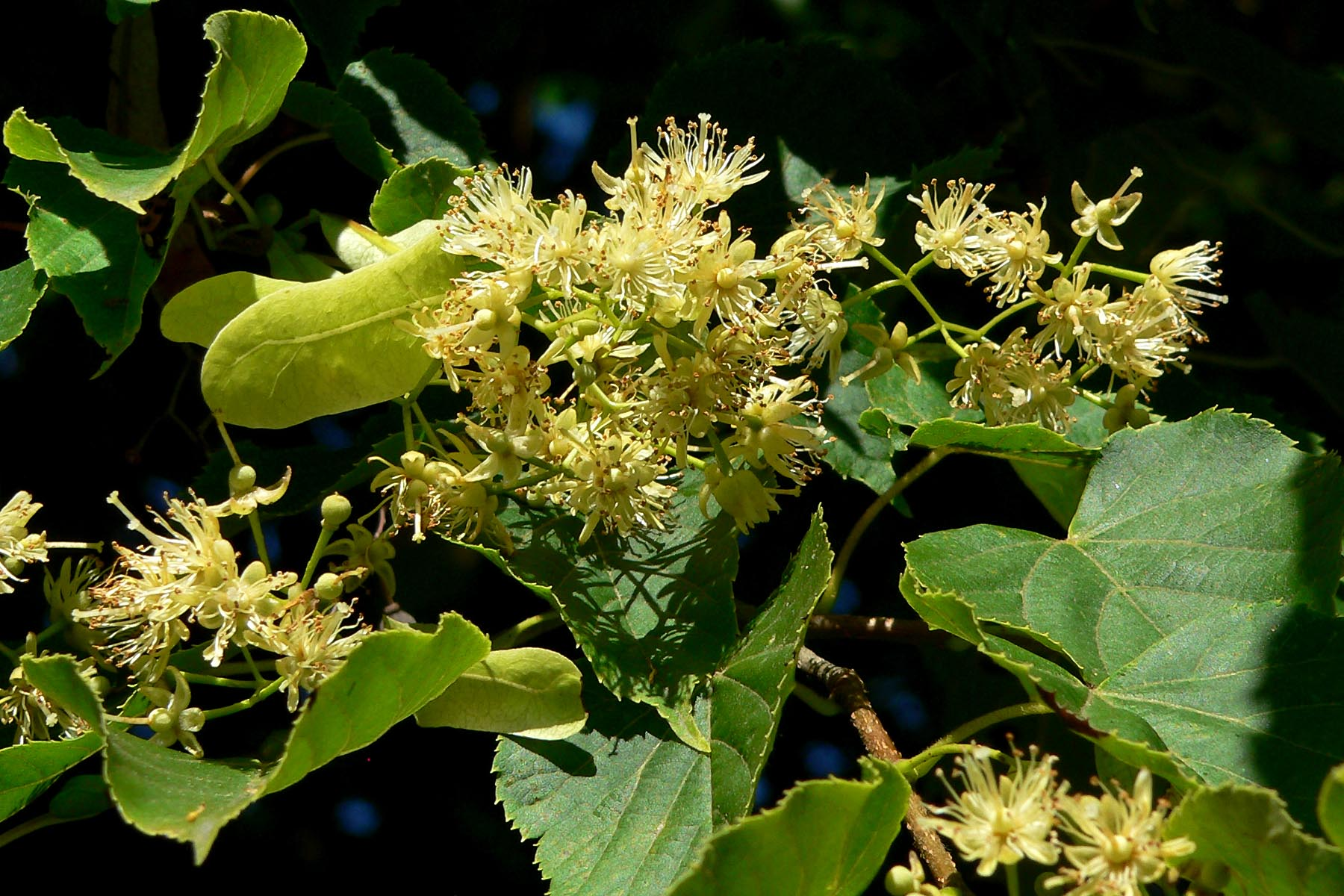
Tilia insularis

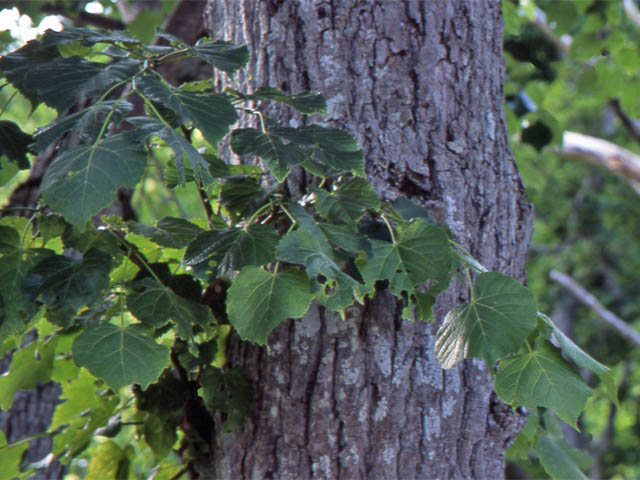
Tilia japonica

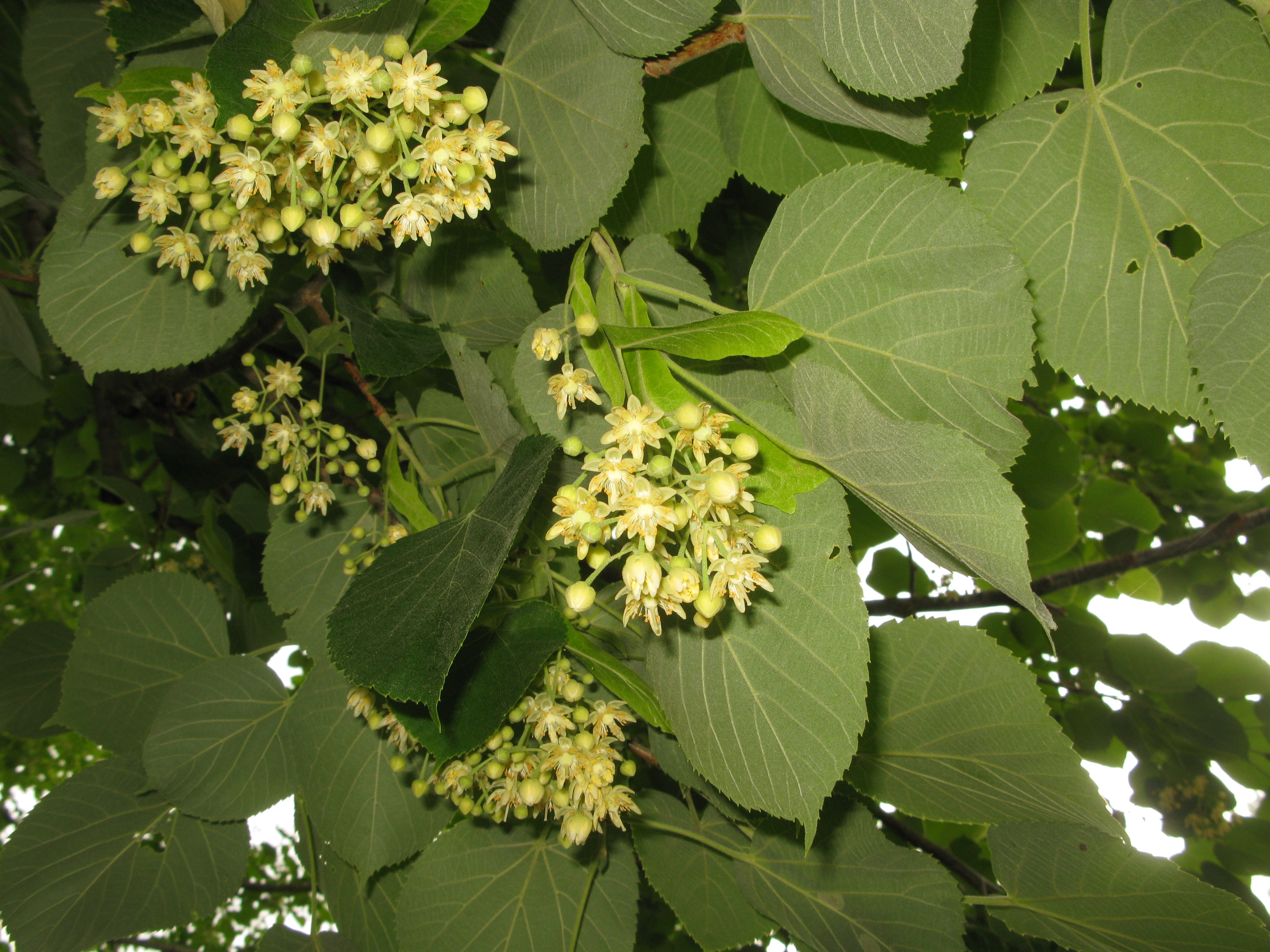
Tilia maximowicziana

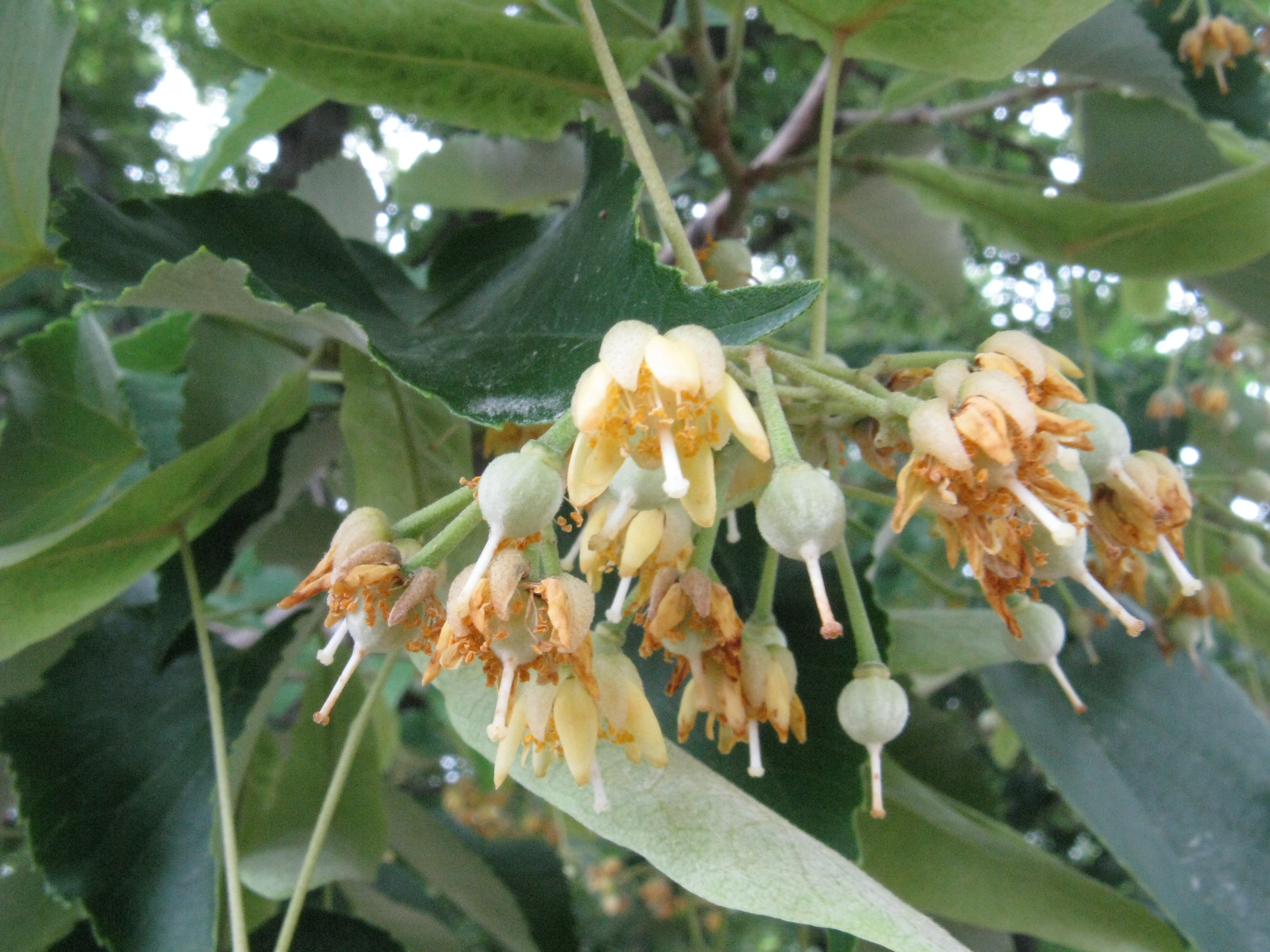
Tilia miqueliana

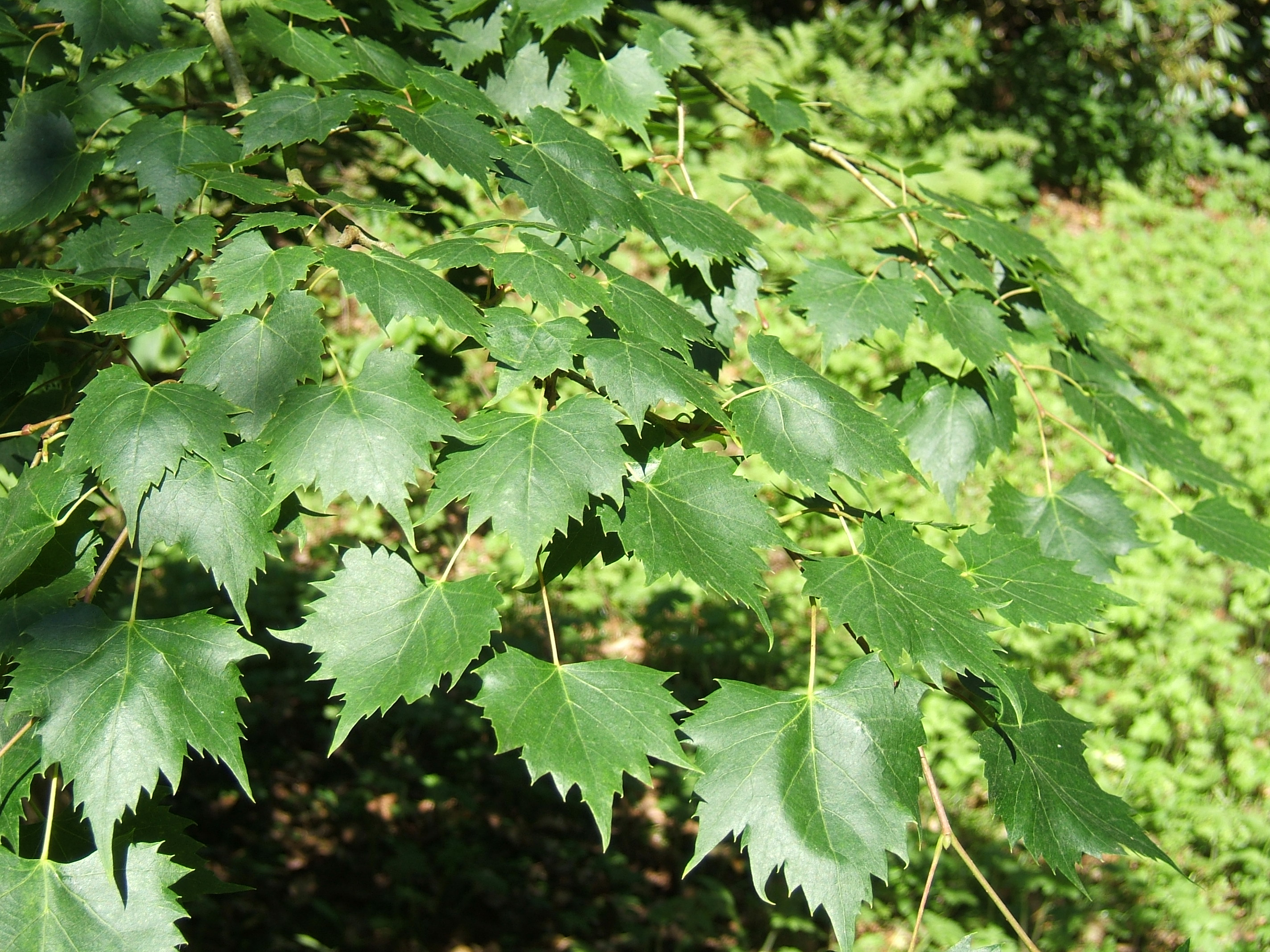
Tilia mongolica

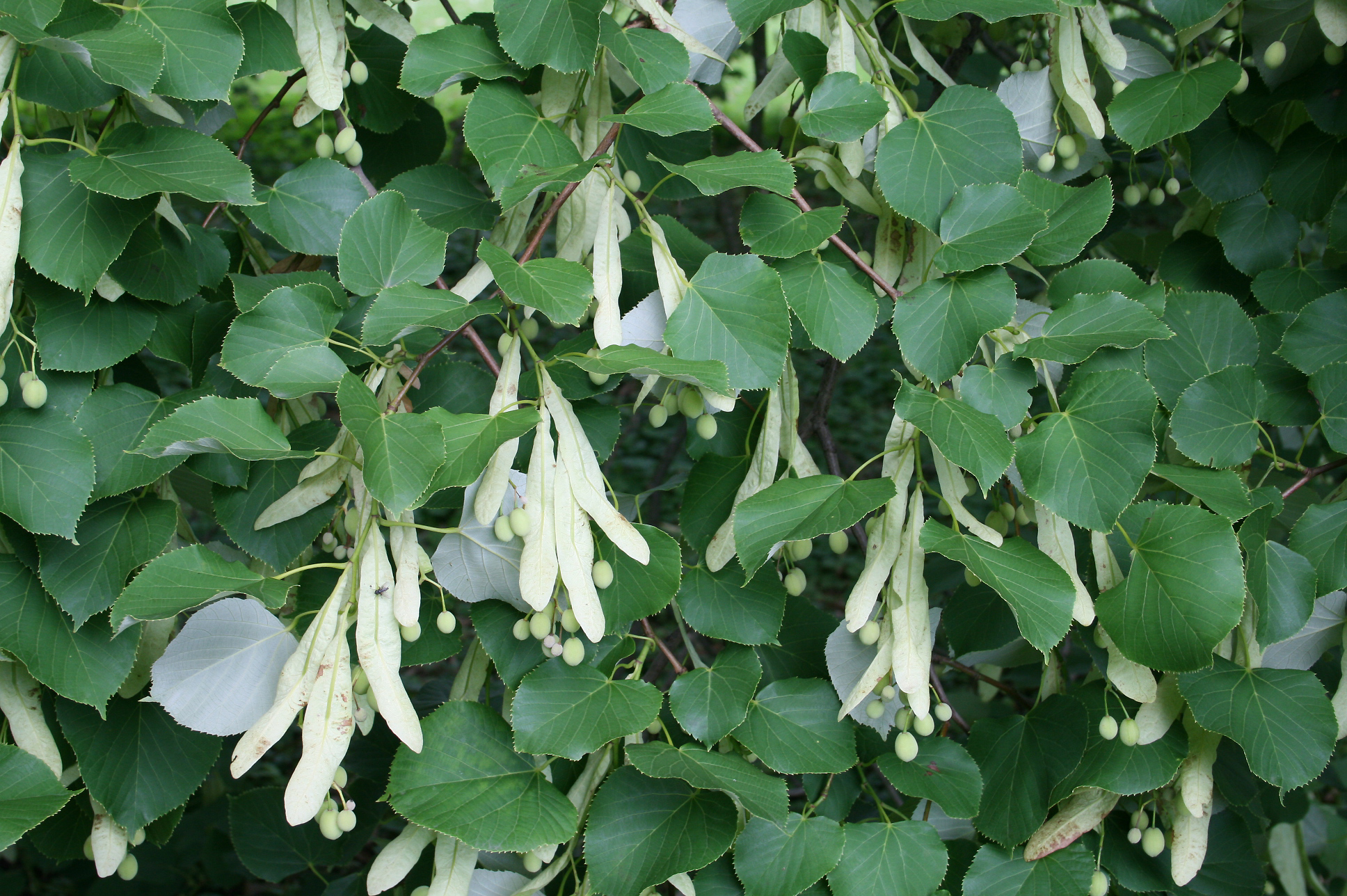
Tilia oliveri

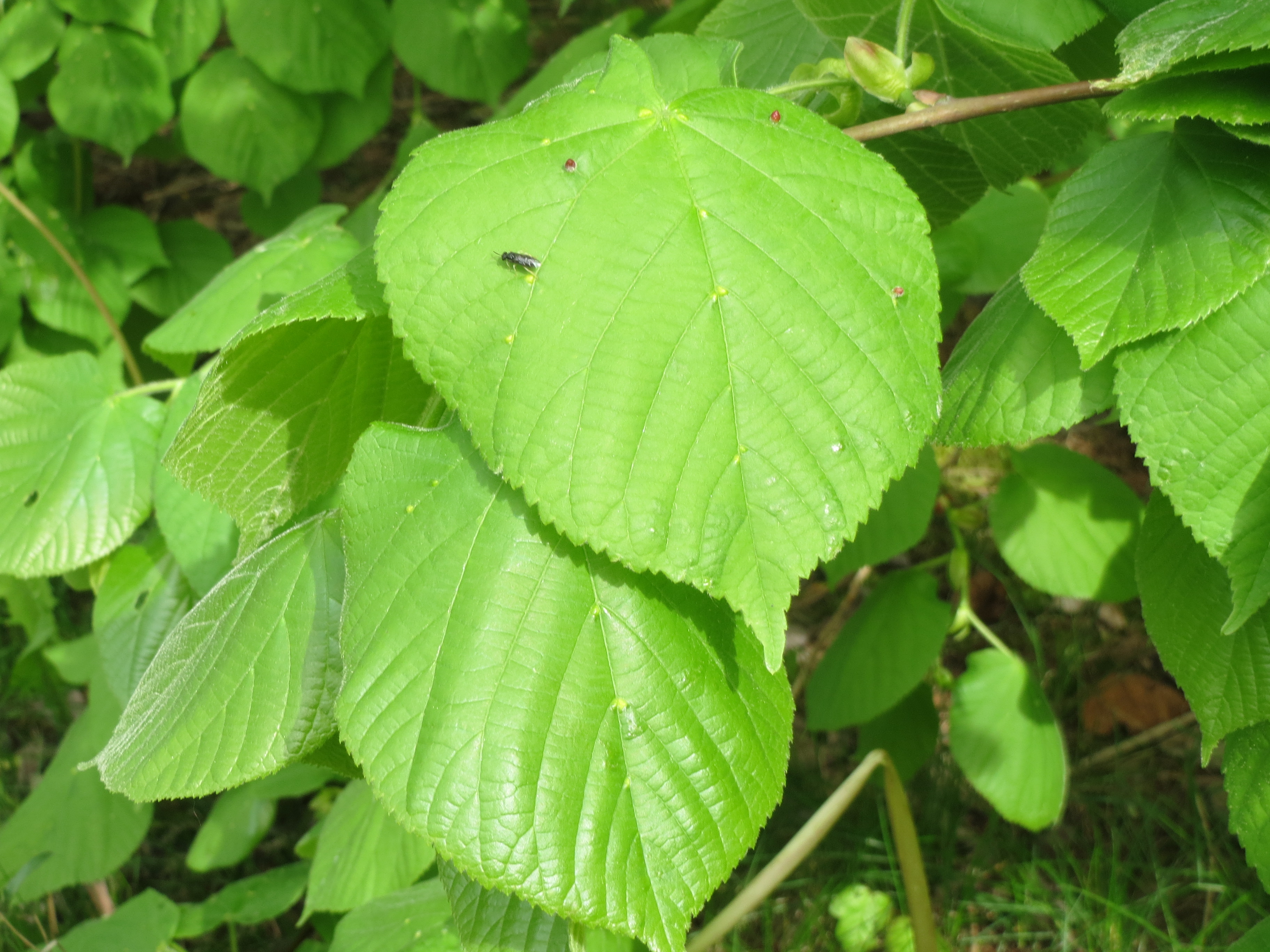
Tilia platyphyllos

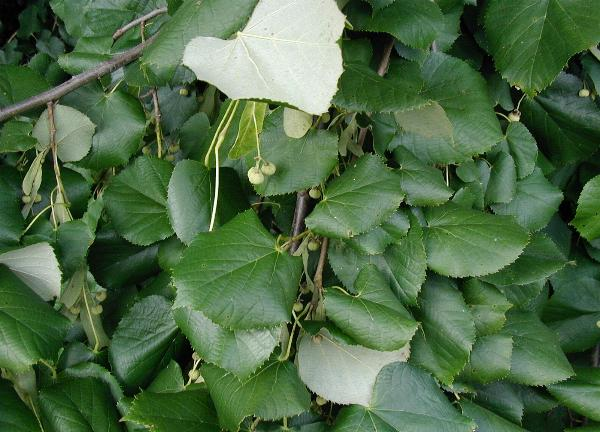
Tilia tomentosa

== See also ==
- International World War Peace Tree, a Tilia tree that stands as a sign of Germany's armistice with the United States
- Matryoshka doll, made from linden trees
- St Lawrence Lime, a former lime tree in Canterbury, England
- Tanzlinde (Effeltrich)
