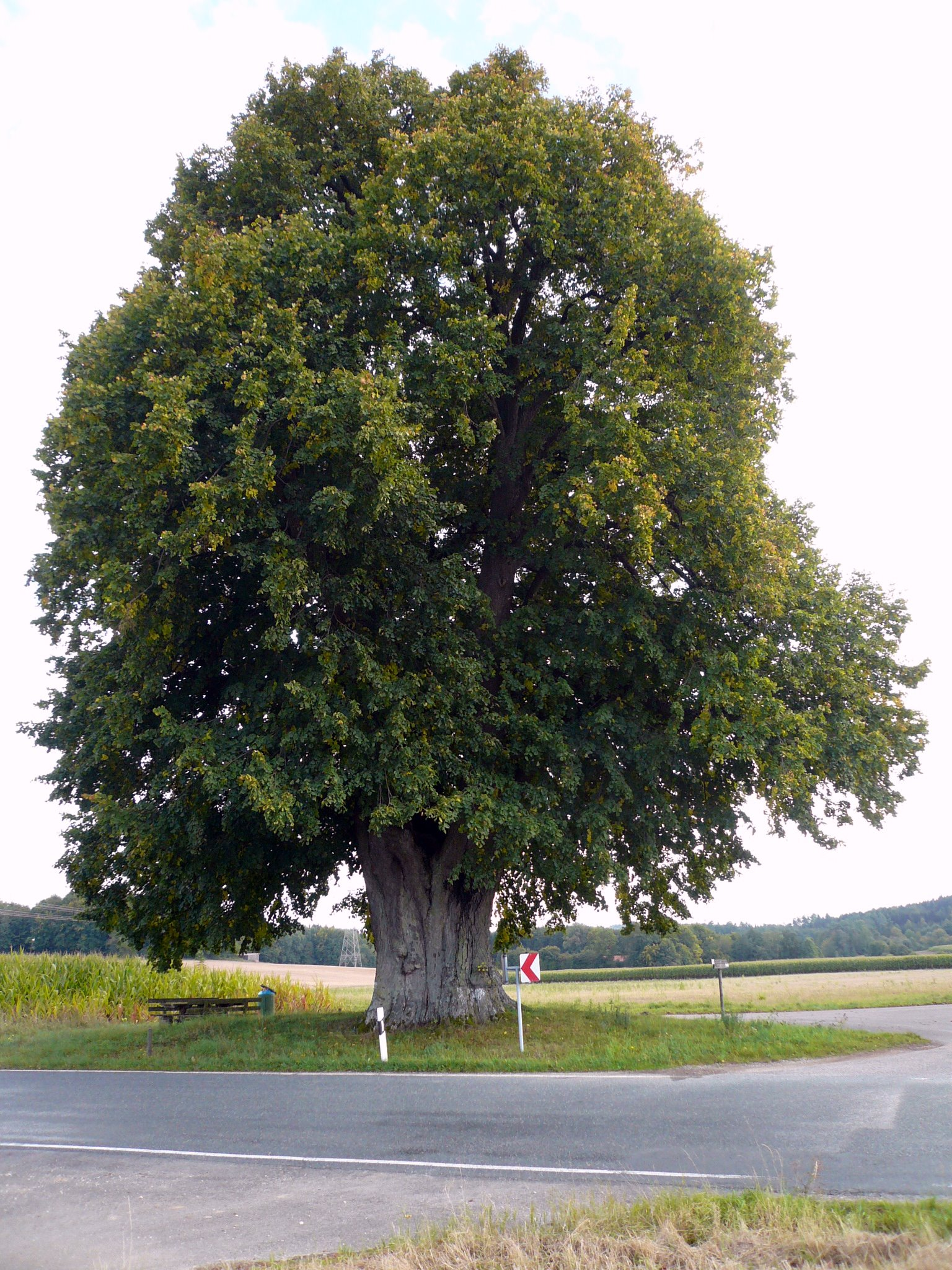
- Tilia platyphyllos specimen in Franconia

Scientific classification
- Kingdom: Plantae
- Clade: Embryophytes
- Clade: Tracheophytes
- Clade: Spermatophytes
- Clade: Angiosperms
- Clade: Eudicots
- Clade: Rosids
- Order: Malvales
- Family: Malvaceae
- Subfamily: Tilioideae; Arnott

Genera
- Craigia W.W.Sm. & W.E.Evans; Mortoniodendron Standl. & Steyerm.; Tilia L.

Synonyms
- Tiliaceae (partim)

= Tilioideae =

Tilioideae Temporal range: Paleocene–Recent

Subfamily of flowering plants

Tilioideae is a flowering plant subfamily in the family Malvaceae, though it was formerly considered a large group, placed at family rank and called Tiliaceae.

Within the framework of the Angiosperm Phylogeny Groups III & IV systems, an extended family Malvaceae is recognized by uniting the core Malvales of the Cronquist system - Bombacaceae, Malvaceae sensu stricto, Sterculiaceae and Tiliaceae. Within the APG classification, Malvaceae contains a clade of 3 living genera placed as the subfamily Tilioideae.

== Genera and species ==
The subfamily includes Tilia, Craigia, and Mortoniodendron. The majority of other genera historically included in the family rank "Tiliaceae" have been moved into two other subfamilies of Malvaceae, the Brownlowioideae and Grewioideae.

=== Craigia ===
- †Craigia bronnii
- †Craigia hainanensis
- Craigia kwangsiensis
- †Craigia oregonensis
- Craigia yunnanensis

=== Mortoniodendron ===
- Mortoniodendron abelianum Al.Rodr.
- Mortoniodendron anisophyllum (Standl.) Standl. & Steyerm.
- Mortoniodendron apetalum Al. Rodr.
- Mortoniodendron cauliflorum Al. Rodr.
- Mortoniodendron guatemalense Standl. & Steyerm.
- Mortoniodendron hirsutum Standl.
- Mortoniodendron longipedunculatum Al. Rodr.
- Mortoniodendron membranaceum Standl. & Steyerm.
- Mortoniodendron moralesii Al.Rodr.
- Mortoniodendron palaciosii Miranda
- Mortoniodendron pentagonum (Donn. Sm.) Miranda
- Mortoniodendron ruizii Miranda
- Mortoniodendron sulcatum Lundell
- Mortoniodendron uxpanapense Dorr & T. Wendt
- Mortoniodendron vestitum Lundell

=== Tilia ===
- Tilia americana L.
- Tilia amurensis
- Tilia caroliniana
- Tilia chinensis
- Tilia chingiana Hu & W.C.Cheng
- Tilia cordata Mill.
- Tilia dasystyla Steven
- Tilia henryana Szyszyl.
- Tilia hupehensis
- Tilia insularis
- Tilia intonsa
- Tilia japonica
- †Tilia johnsoni Wolfe & Wehr Ypresian
- Tilia kiusiana
- Tilia mandshurica
- Tilia maximowicziana
- Tilia miqueliana
- Tilia mongolica Maxim.
- Tilia nasczokinii
- Tilia nobilis
- Tilia oliveri
- Tilia paucicostata
- Tilia platyphyllos Scop.
- Tilia rubra
- Tilia tomentosa Moench
- Tilia tuan Szyszyl.
