= Ulmus glabra 'Nana' =

Elm cultivar

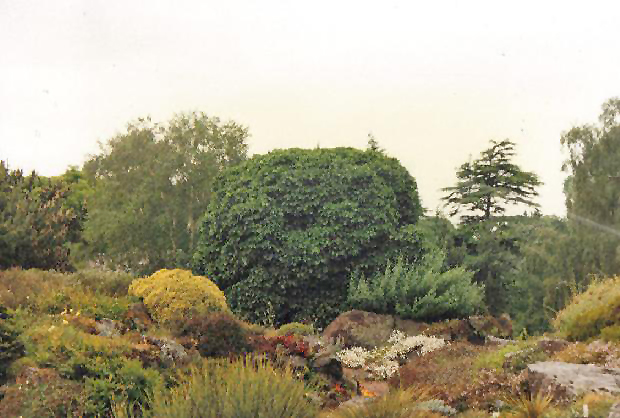
- 'Nana', Royal Botanic Gardens Edinburgh (1989)
- Species: Ulmus glabra
- Cultivar: 'Nana'
- Origin: Europe

The dwarf wych elm cultivar Ulmus glabra 'Nana', a very slow growing shrub that with time forms a small tree, is of unknown origin. It was listed in the Simon-Louis (Metz, France) 1869 catalogue as Ulmus montana nana. Henry (1913), referring his readers to an account of the Kew specimen in the journal Woods and Forests, 1884, suggested that it may have originated from a witch's broom. It is usually classified as a form of Ulmus glabra and is known widely as the 'Dwarf Wych Elm'. However, the ancestry of 'Nana' has been disputed in more recent years, Melville considering the specimen once grown at Kew to have been a cultivar of Ulmus × hollandica.

Not to be confused with Loudon's U. campestris nana (1838), a dwarf field elm "with small, narrow, rough leaves", or with Ulmus 'Monstrosa', a long-petioled dwarf field-elm cultivar sometimes referred to as 'Nana Monstrosa'.

== Description ==
The tree rarely exceeds 5 m in height, but is often broader. The dark green leaves are smaller than the wych type, 5–9 centimeters (2.0–3.5 in) long, often with one or two cusp-like lobes either side of the apex. The thick twigs, short petiole and diminutive samara with seed close to base, all point to U. glabra origin. A specimen at Kew was described by Henry as 'a slow-growing hemispherical bush that has not increased appreciably in size for many years'. Green describes 'Nana' as growing some 60 centimeters (24 in) in 10 to 12 years.

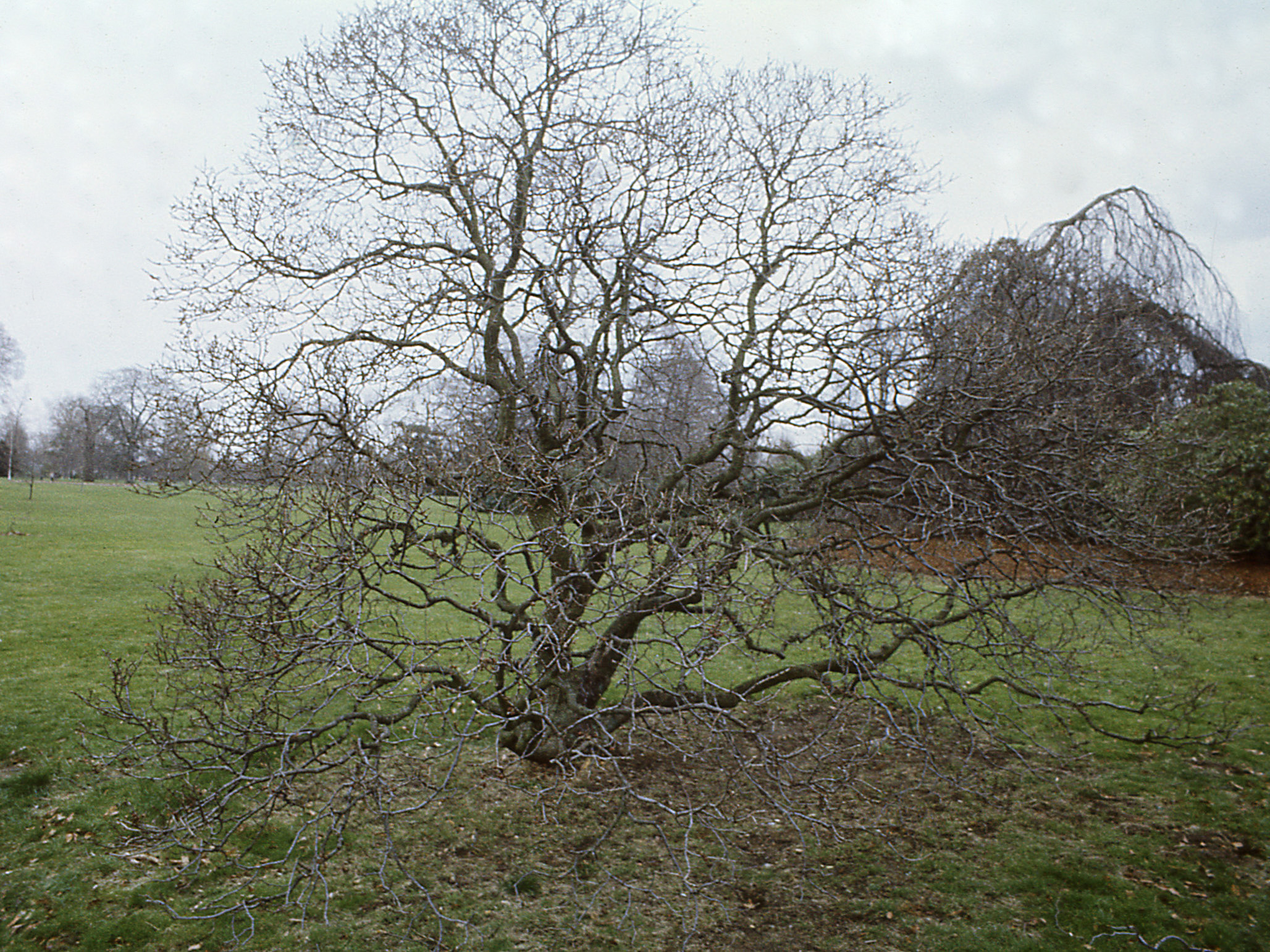
'Nana' in winter, Royal Botanic Gardens, Kew (1986)

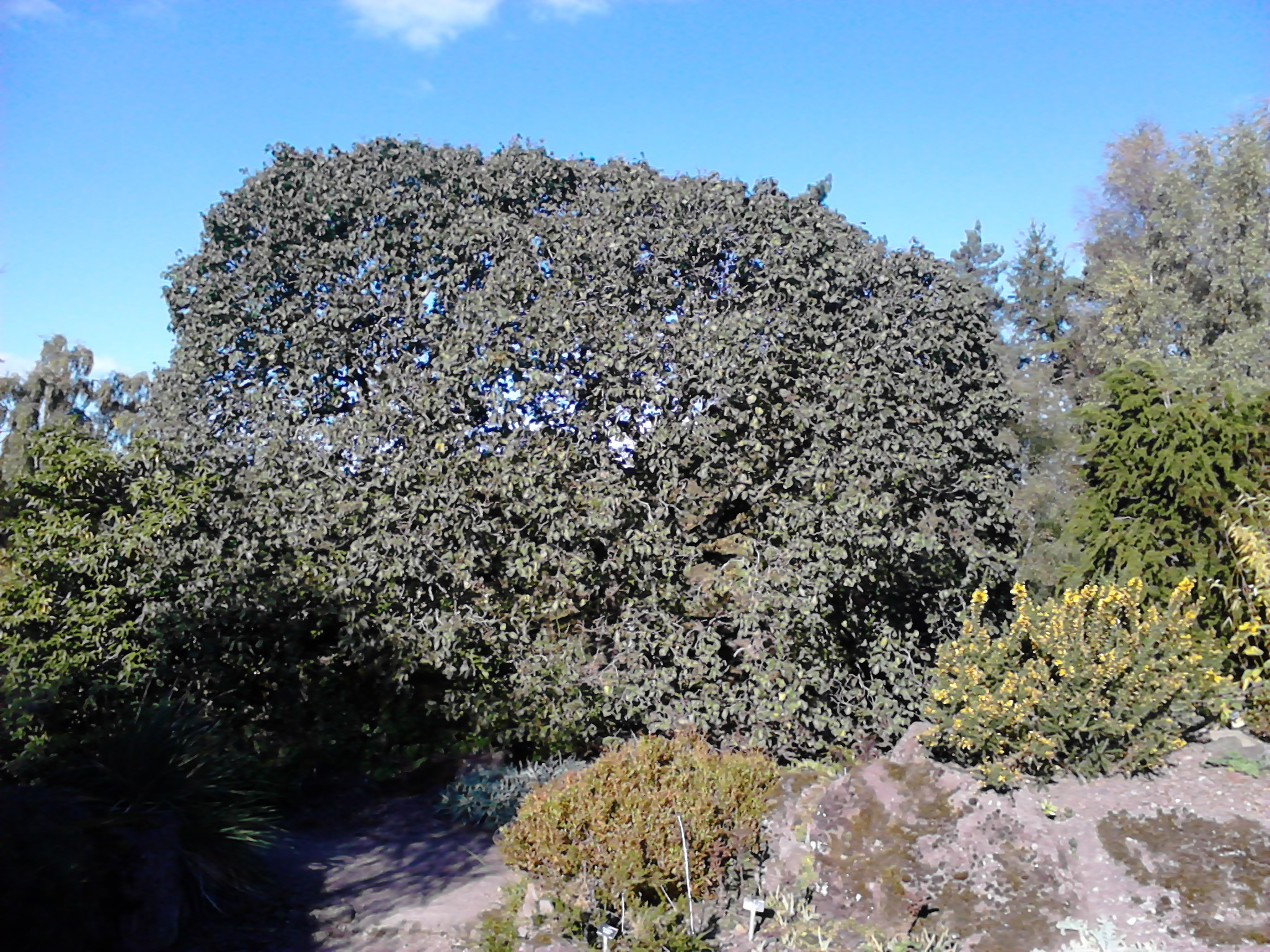
'Nana' in late summer, Royal Botanic Gardens Edinburgh (2016)

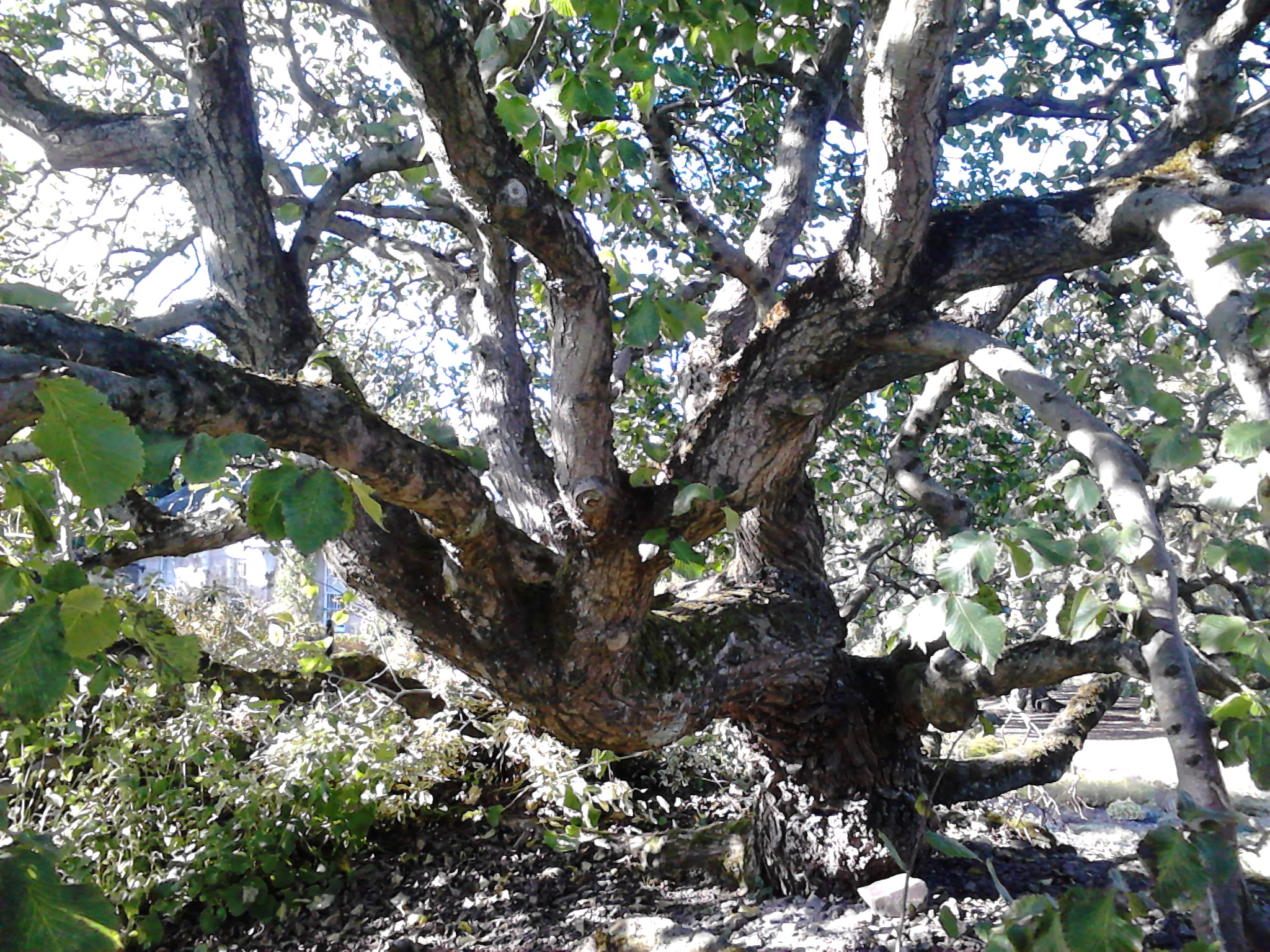
Bole of same

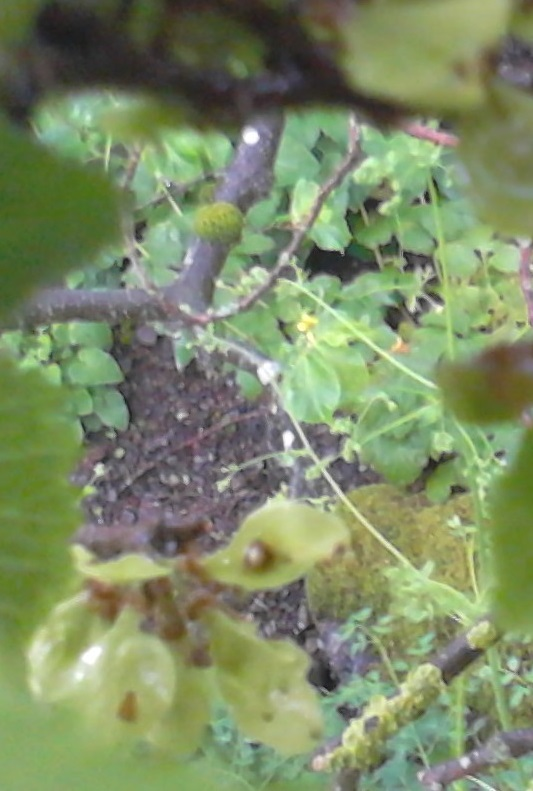
Samarae

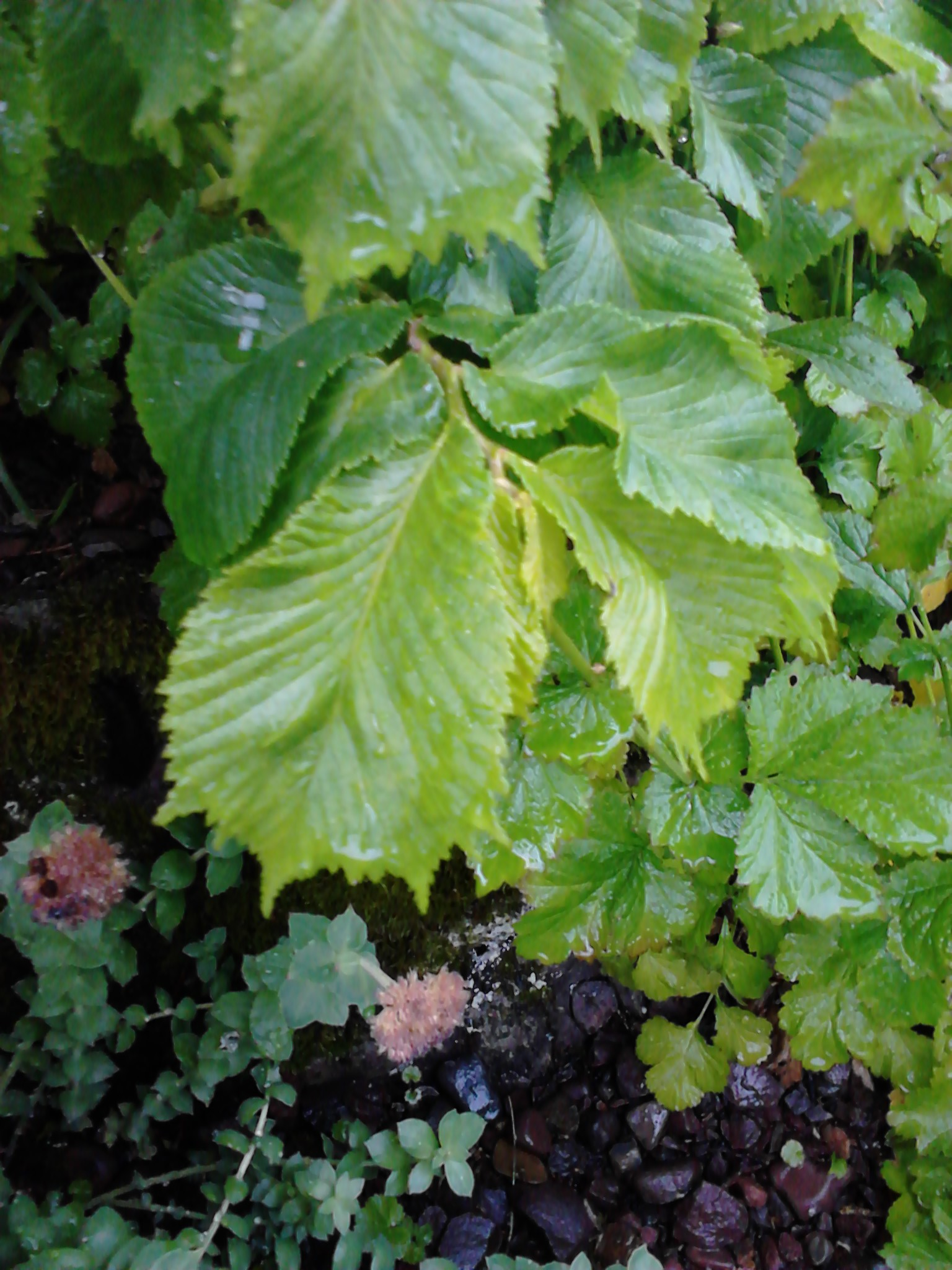
'Nana' leaves, spring

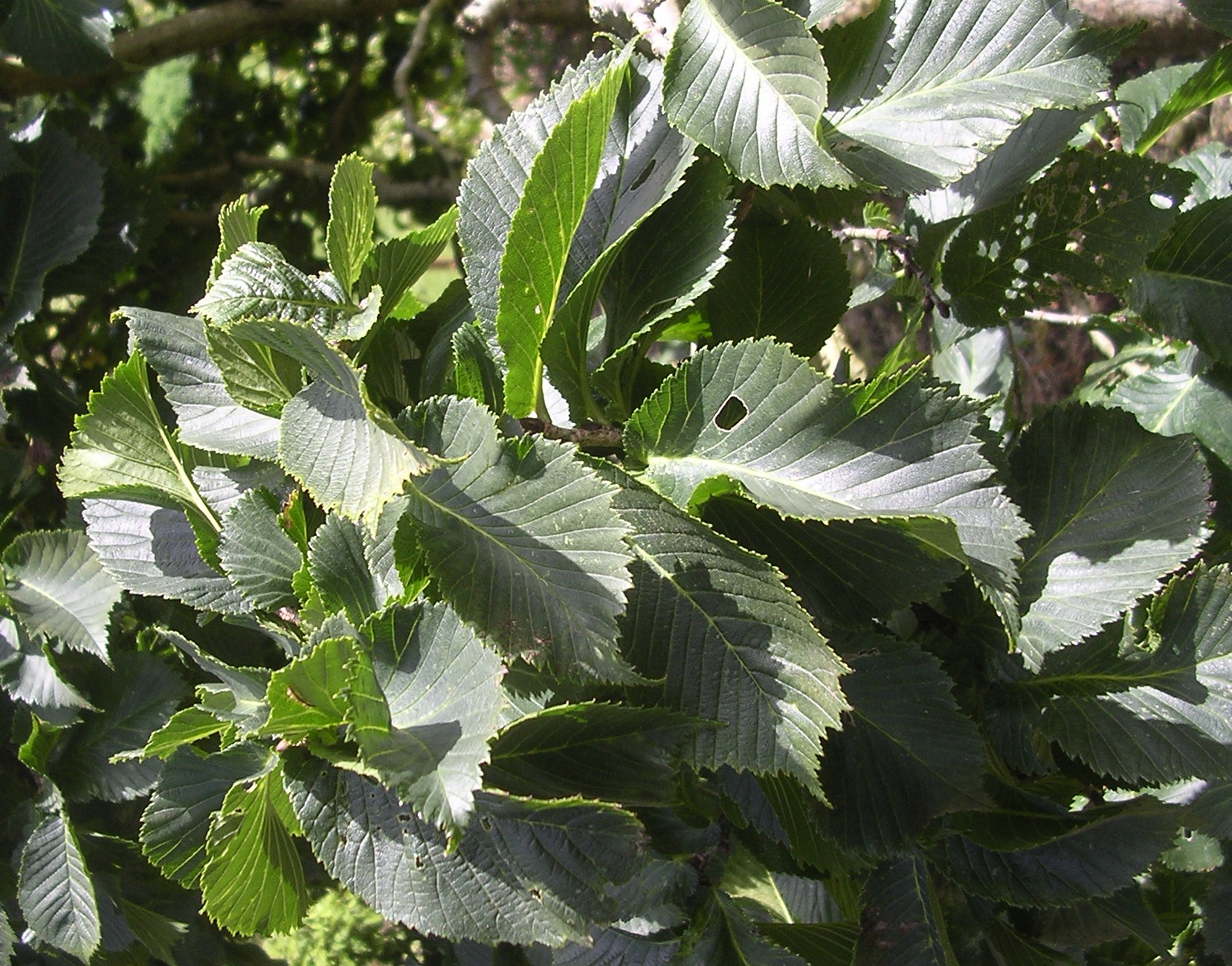
'Nana' leaves, summer

== Pests and diseases ==
The low height of the tree should ensure that it avoids colonization by Scolytus bark beetles and thus remain free of Dutch elm disease. It has been noted that shrub-elms are usually less prone to infection.

== Cultivation ==
The Späth nursery of Berlin marketed U. montana nana in the late 19th century. It was introduced to the Dominion Arboretum, Ottawa, Canada, in 1898. Ulmus montana nana, 'Dwarf Scotch Elm', was introduced to the USA in the late 19th century, appearing as a "new variety" in the 1897 catalogue of the Mount Hope Nursery (also known as Ellwanger and Barry) of Rochester, New York. A 'Nana' appeared as U. nana, 'Dwarf American elm', a "very small" elm with compact habit, in Kelsey's 1904 catalogue, New York. (Other European elms described as 'American' by various nurseries include 'Vegeta', 'Scampstoniensis', and 'Lutescens'.) There was a well-grown specimen in Missouri Botanical Garden in the mid 20th century. The tree is still occasionally found in arboreta and gardens in the UK, Europe and North America. It is not known in Australasia. 'Nana' remains in cultivation in Europe (see Nurseries).

A shrub elm sold in the Netherlands as U. 'Monstrosa' appeared from its leaf and short petiole to be 'Nana', while one cultivated in the Royal Botanic Garden Edinburgh in the early 20th century as 'Nana' appears from its leaf and long petiole to have been 'Monstrosa'. The current RBGE 'Nana' is the authentic wych clone (2017).

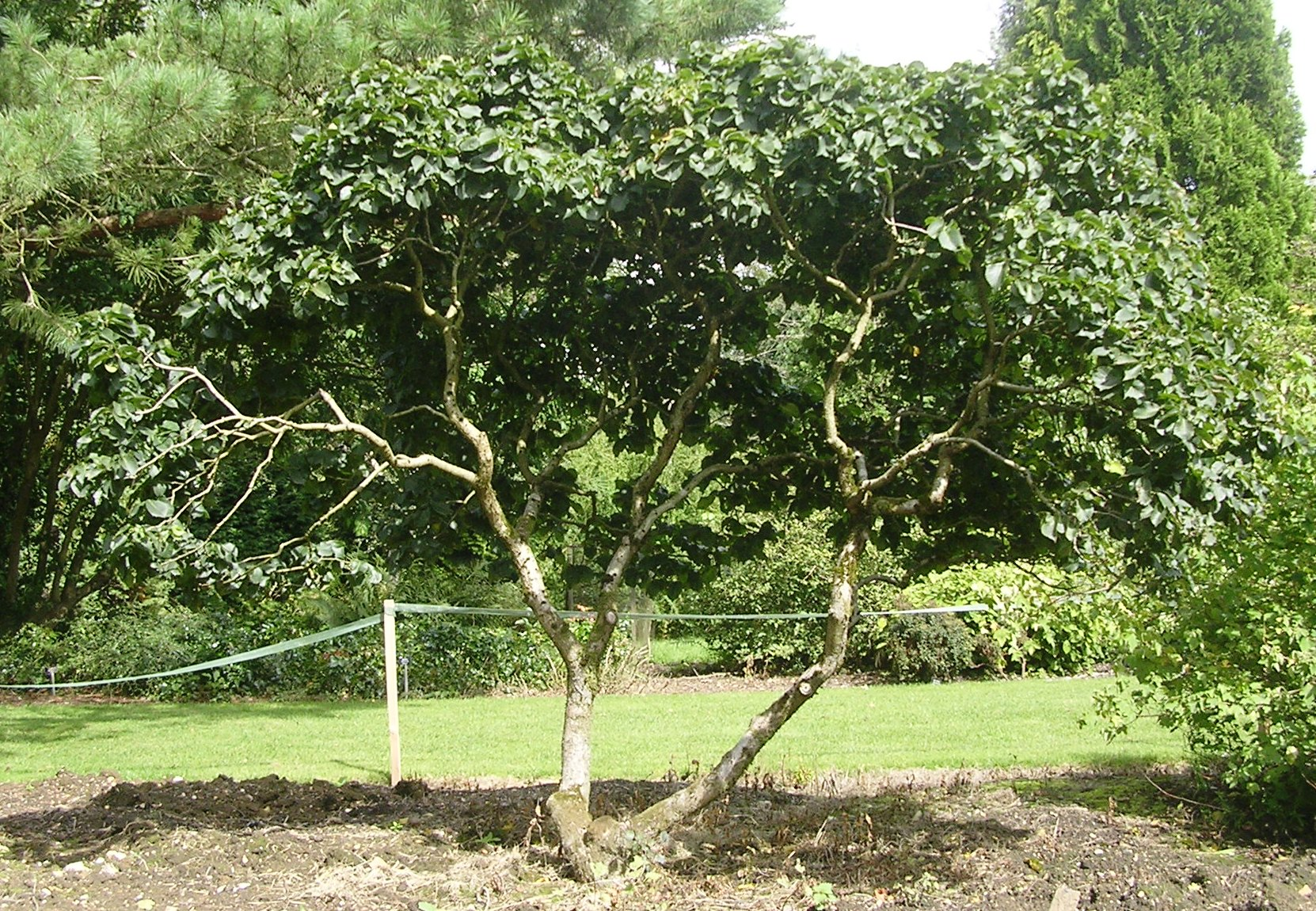
Pruned 'Nana', Sir Harold Hillier Gardens, UK (2008)

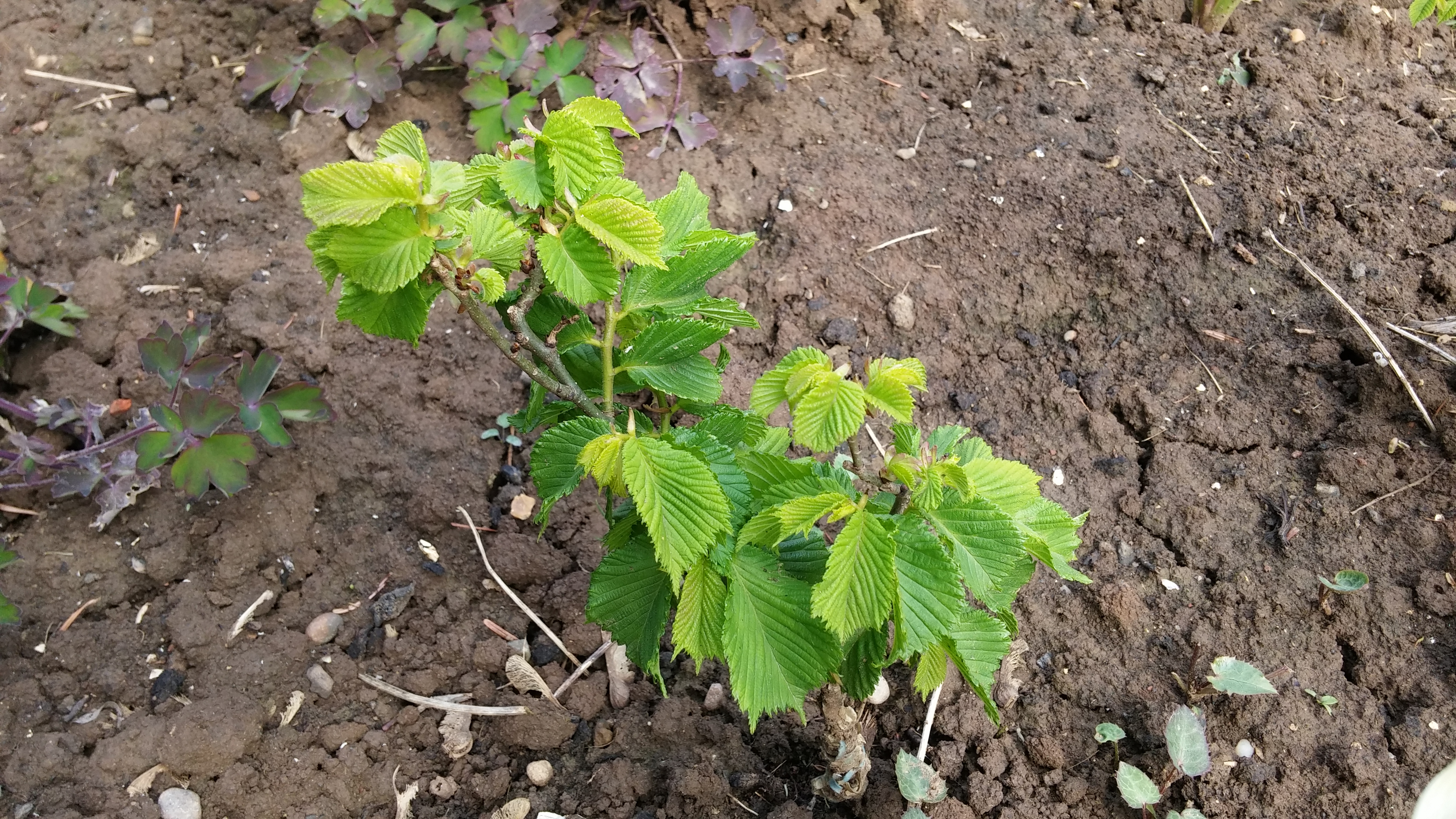
Young 'Nana'

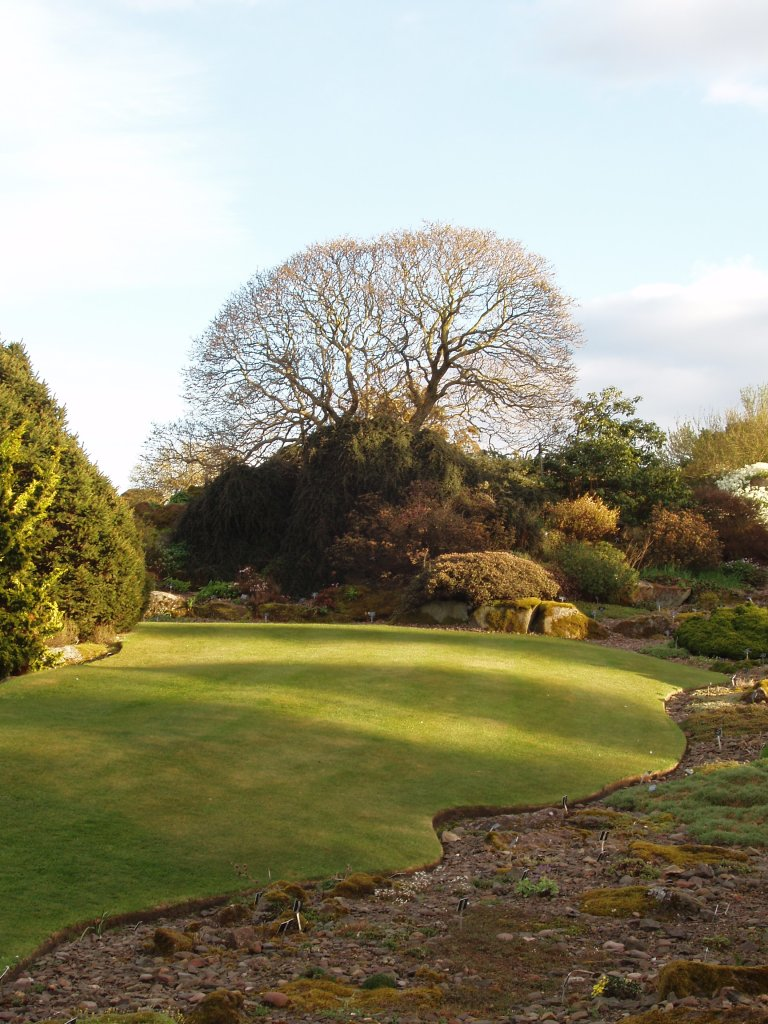
'Nana' in flower, RBGE

== Notable trees ==
The specimen of 'Nana' in the University Parks (North Walk), Oxford, UK, has attained a height of about 6 m (2017). Another grew in Alexandra Park, East Sussex, UK, measured 6 m high, 38 cm dia. at 1 m from ground in 1980 but is possibly now lost.

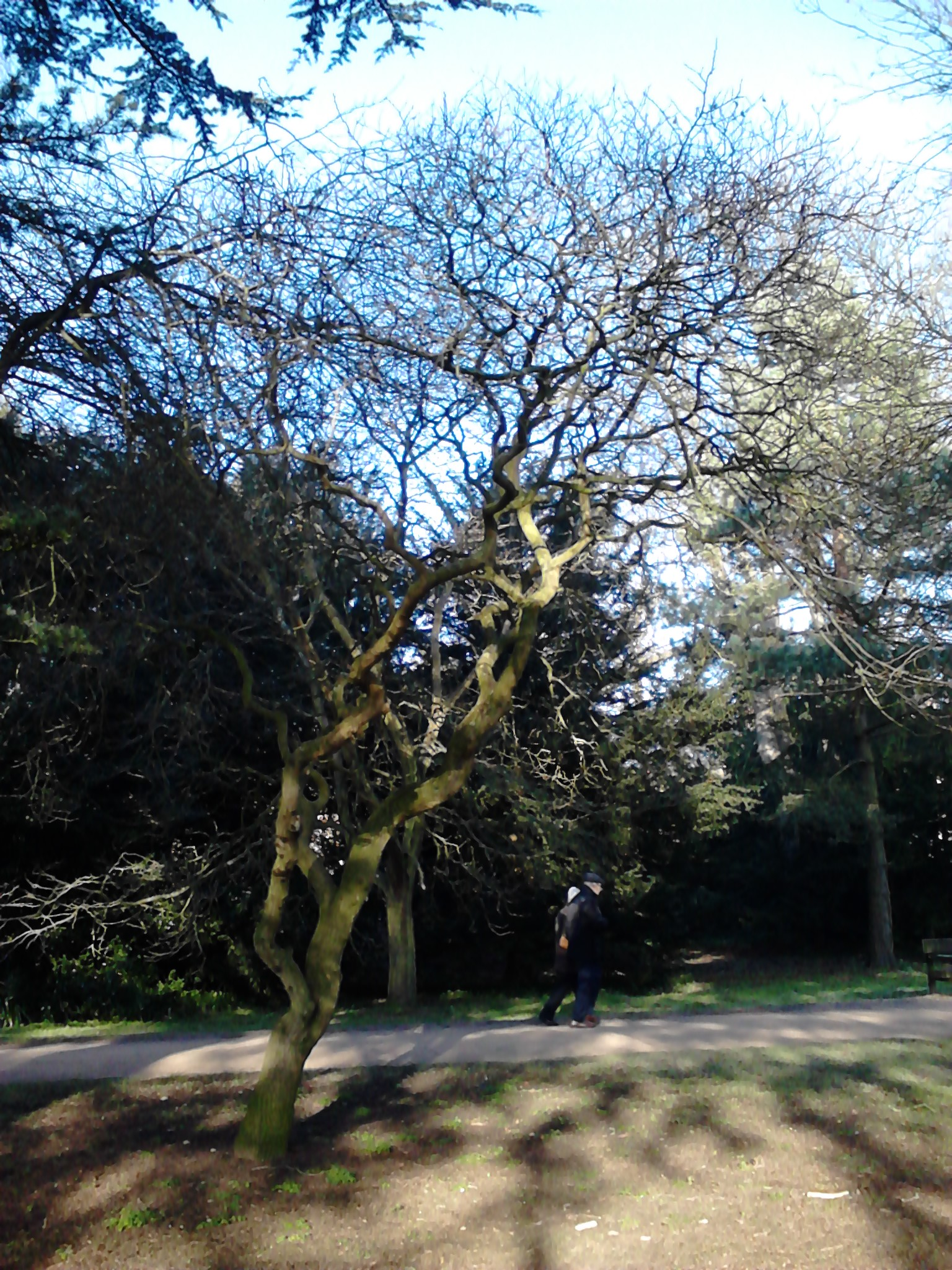
'Nana' in Oxford University Parks (2017)

== Synonymy ==
- Ulmus scabra nana Dipp.
- Ulmus glabra 'Bush': Plant Buyer's Guide, ed. 5, 253, 1949, without description.

== Accessions ==
North America

- Arnold Arboretum, UK. Acc. no. 448–88

Europe

- Royal Botanic Garden Edinburgh, UK. Acc. no. 19021001, two trees in excellent condition (2004).
- Royal Horticultural Society Gardens Wisley, UK. Two specimens, no details available.
- Sir Harold Hillier Gardens, Romsey, Hampshire, UK. Acc. nos. 1978.1680, 1978.4729
- University of Copenhagen Botanic Gardens, Denmark. No details available.
- Grange Farm Arboretum, Lincolnshire, UK. Acc. no. 1128. Accessioned as U. 'Monstrosa'.

== Nurseries ==
=== North America ===
None known

=== Europe ===
- A Touch of Green , Amstelveen, Netherlands.
- Arboretum Waasland, Nieuwkerken-Waas, Belgium.
- H. Kolster , Boskoop, Netherlands.
- PlantenTuin Esveld , Netherlands.
- Szkółki Konieczko , Gogolin, Poland.
