= Jardins de Coursiana =

Botanical gardens with an arboretum in La Romieu, Gers, Midi-Pyrénées, France

Coordinates: 43.9777°N 0.4926°E

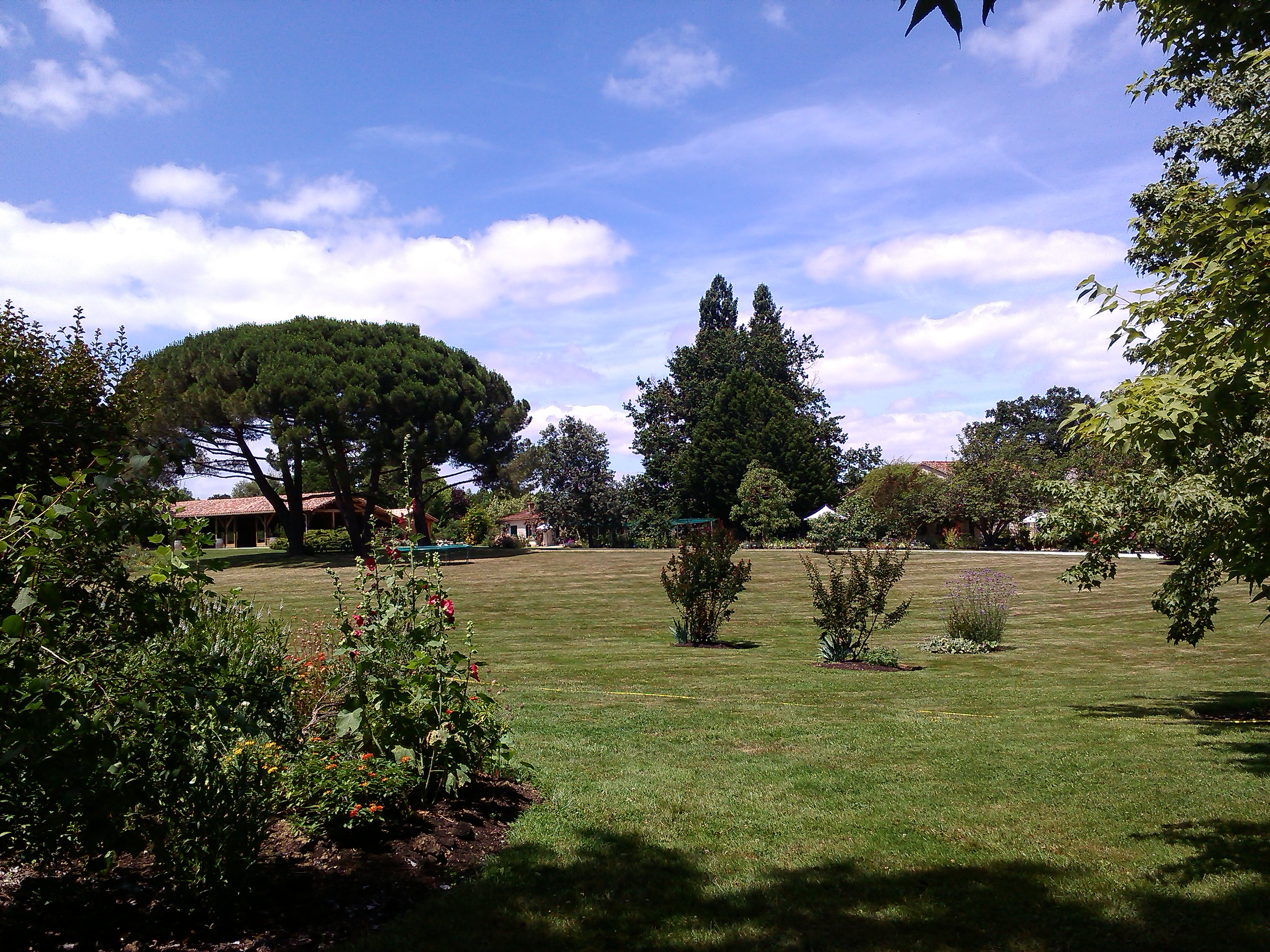
The Jardins de Coursiana

The Jardins de Coursiana, also known as the Arboretum Coursiana, are botanical gardens with an arboretum (6 hectares) located in La Romieu, Gers, Midi-Pyrénées, France. They are open daily in the warmer months; an admission fee is charged.

The arboretum was created in 1974 by eminent French botanist Gilbert Cours-Darne. In 2000 its Tilia collection (more than 60 taxa) was designated a national collection by the Conservatoire des collections végétales spécialisées (CCVS), in 2001 the garden of aromatic and medicinal plants was begun, and in 2005 the ensemble was designated a Jardin remarquable by the Minister of Culture.

Today the arboretum contains 700 species of trees and shrubs, including mature Quercus robur (200 years old), as well as Aesculus californica, Alnus cresmatogyne, Davidia involucrata, Firmiana simplex, Parrotia persica, Sassafras officinalis, Tilia americana nova, Tilia chemnoui, and Tilia henryana. The gardens also include an English garden, vegetable garden, and garden of aromatic and medicinal plants.

== See also ==
- List of botanical gardens in France
