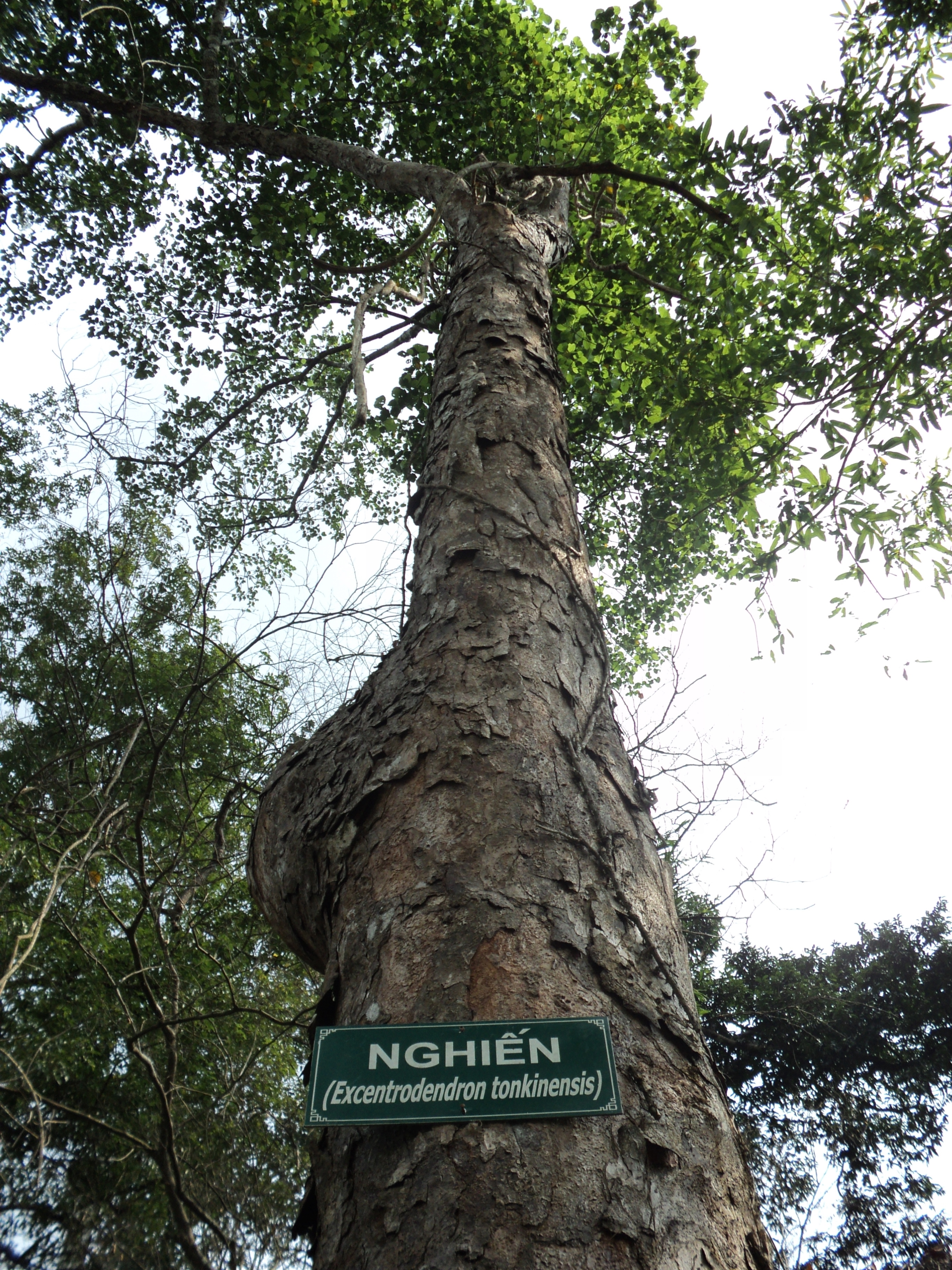
- Excentrodendron tonkinense (now Burretiodendron tonkinense)

Scientific classification
- Kingdom: Plantae
- Clade: Tracheophytes
- Clade: Angiosperms
- Clade: Eudicots
- Clade: Rosids
- Order: Malvales
- Family: Malvaceae
- Subfamily: Dombeyoideae
- Genus: Burretiodendron; Rehder

Species
- Several, see text

Synonyms
- Excentrodendron H.T.Chang & R.H.Miau; Parapentace Gagnep.

= Burretiodendron =

Genus of flowering plants

Burretiodendron is a genus of trees. Traditionally included in the family Tiliaceae, it is included in the expanded Malvaceae in the APG and most subsequent systematics. It contains some species formerly in the (not too closely related) genus Pentace. Thus, Parapentace Gagnep. may be a synonym of Burretiodendron rather than Pentace.

These are deciduous or semi-evergreen trees with heart-shaped leaves and winged capsules.

This genus is native to and distributed in Asia, from southern China to Vietnam, Myanmar, and Thailand.

== Species ==
Species include:

- Burretiodendron brilletii (Gagnep.) Kosterm. northern Vietnam
- Burretiodendron esquirolii (H.Lév.) Rehder southern China, Myanmar, Thailand
- Burretiodendron kydiifolium Y.C.Hsu & R.Zhuge – southern Yunnan (China)
- Burretiodendron obconicum W.Y.Chun & F.C.How – Guangxi (China)
- Burretiodendron siamense Kosterm. – west-central Thailand and Mergui Archipelago (Myanmar)
- Burretiodendron tonkinense (A.Chev.) Kosterm. (synonym Burretiodendron hsienmu W.Y.Chun & F.C.How) – Yunnan and Guangxi (China), and northern Vietnam

=== Formerly placed here ===
- Craigia yunnanensis W.W.Sm. & W.E.Evans (as Burretiodendron combretoides W.Y.Chun & F.C.How and Burretiodendron yunnanense Kosterm.)
