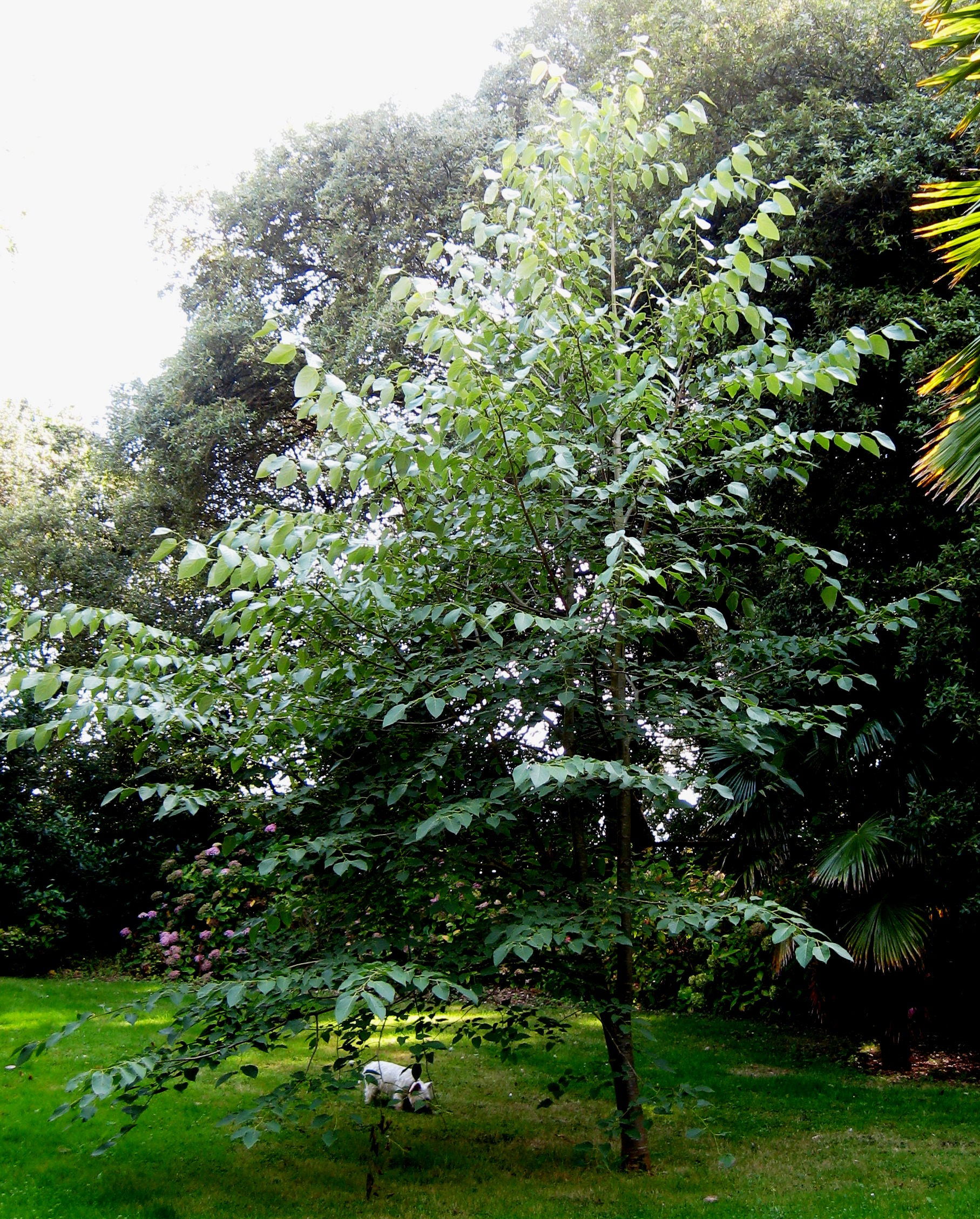
- Tilia tuan at Ventnor Botanic Garden

Scientific classification
- Kingdom: Plantae
- Clade: Tracheophytes
- Clade: Angiosperms
- Clade: Eudicots
- Clade: Rosids
- Order: Malvales
- Family: Malvaceae
- Genus: Tilia
- Species: T. tuan

Binomial name
- Tilia tuan Szyszyl.

Synonyms
- Tilia angustibracteata H. T. Chang; Tilia austro-yunnanica H. T. Chang; Tilia chenmoui W. C.Cheng; Tilia gracilis H. T. Chang; Tilia hupehensis W. C. Cheng ex Hung T. Chang; Tilia integerrima H. T. Chang; Tilia mesembrinos Merr.; Tilia oblongifolia Rehder; Tilia obscura Hand.-Mazz.; Tilia omeiensis Fang; Tilia tristis Chun ex H. T. Chang; Tilia tuan f. divaricata V. Engl.; Tilia tuan var. cavaleriei Engl. & H. Lév.; Tilia tuan var. pruinosa V. Engl.

= Tilia tuan =

Species of tree

Tilia tuan is a species of flowering plant found in forests at elevations of 1200–2400 m in the central Chinese provinces of Guangxi, Guizhou, Hubei, Hunan, Jiangsu, Jiangsu, Jiangxi, Sichuan, Yunnan, and Zhejiang. The species has long been regarded as the most variable lime within China, acquiring numerous synonyms; three varieties are currently recognized. The tree was first described by Henry who discovered it in 1888.

== Description ==
Tilia tuan is a deciduous tree reaching 10–20 m in height, its bark grey and longitudinally exfoliate; the branches are glabrous or tomentose, and form an open crown. The leaves are paper-thin, narrowly ovate or ovate-oblong to ovate-orbicular, 6.5–17 × 3.5–11 cm, on 1–6 cm petioles, the base oblique, rounded, truncate, or cordate, the margin can be entire or with minute teeth, or prominently dentate, the apex acuminate or acute. The upper surface is nearly all glabrous, the lower covered with a close grey felt. The violet-scented inflorescences appearing in late summer are cymes comprising 3–22 flowers 5–14 cm long, the petals 6–8 mm. The fruits are globose to obovoid-globose, 7–11 × 7–9mm, hard, and brown or grey hairy, and ripen between July and November. Ploidy: N = 82.

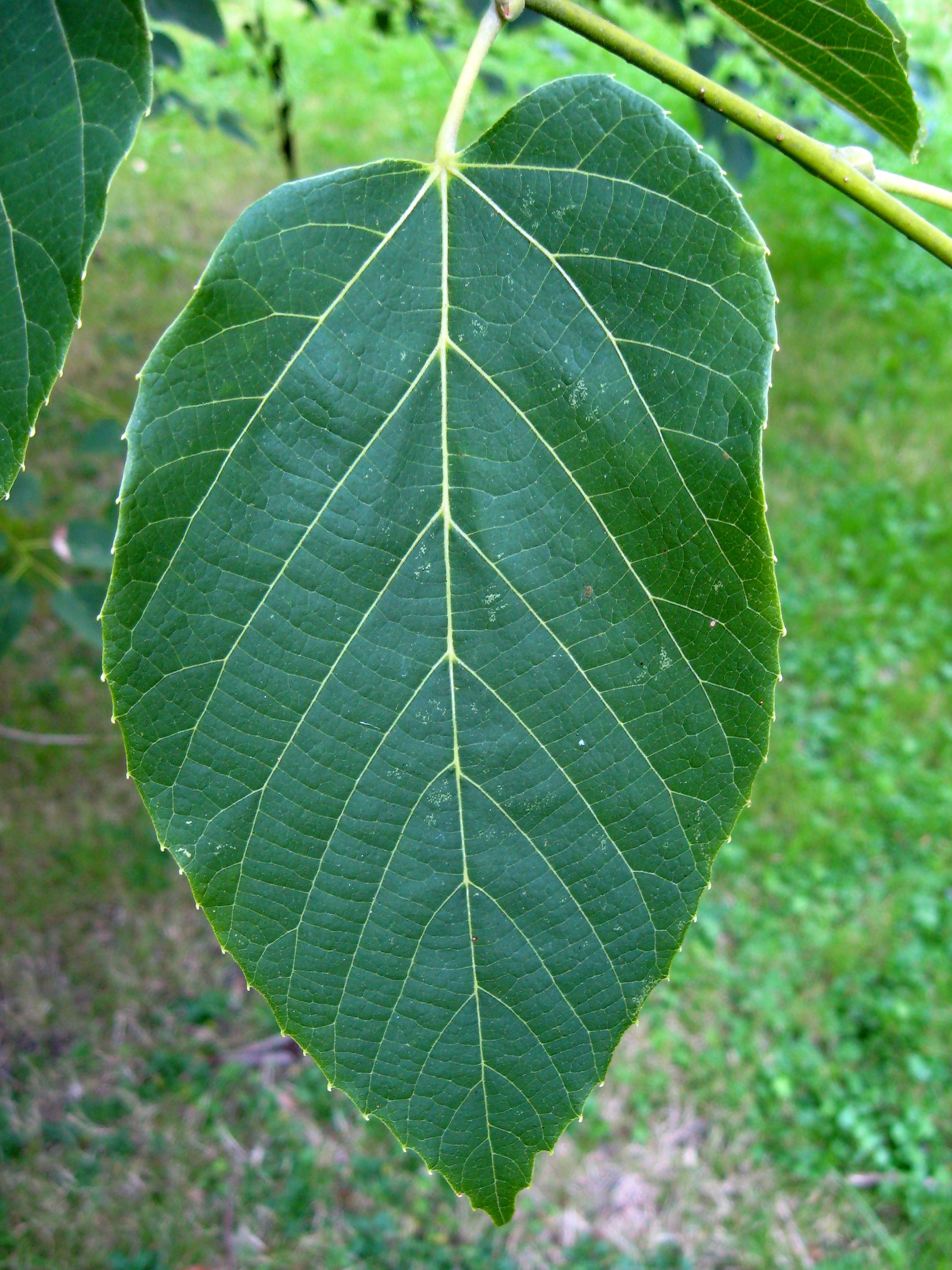
Tilia tuan leaf

== Cultivation ==
The species and the variety Chinensis are believed to have been introduced to the UK by Wilson while collecting for Veitch, though there is no record of their subsequent distribution.

=== Notable trees ===
Probably the largest specimens surviving in the UK are at Thorp Perrow Arboretum, Yorkshire, planted 1936 and measuring 21 m × 0.7 m d.b.h. in 2004, and at Borde Hill, Surrey; the latter bought at the Aldenham sale of 1932 as var. Chinensis, which measured 20 m × 1 m d.b.h. in 1984.

== Varieties ==
Three varieties are recognized, var. Tuan, var. Chinensis, and var. Chenmoui, distinguished by minor differences in the inflorescences or leaf margins.

== Accessions ==
=== Europe ===
- Borde Hill Arboretum, Surrey, UK. Acc. no. not known. Planted 1932.
- Sir Harold Hillier Gardens, Hampshire, UK. acc. nos. 1983.1908, provenance unknown; 2002.0615, wild collected, Yunnan, China.
- Thorp Perrow Arboretum, Yorkshire, UK. Acc. no. not known. Planted 1936.
- Ventnor Botanic Garden, Isle of Wight, UK. As Tilia chenmoui. Acc. details not known.
