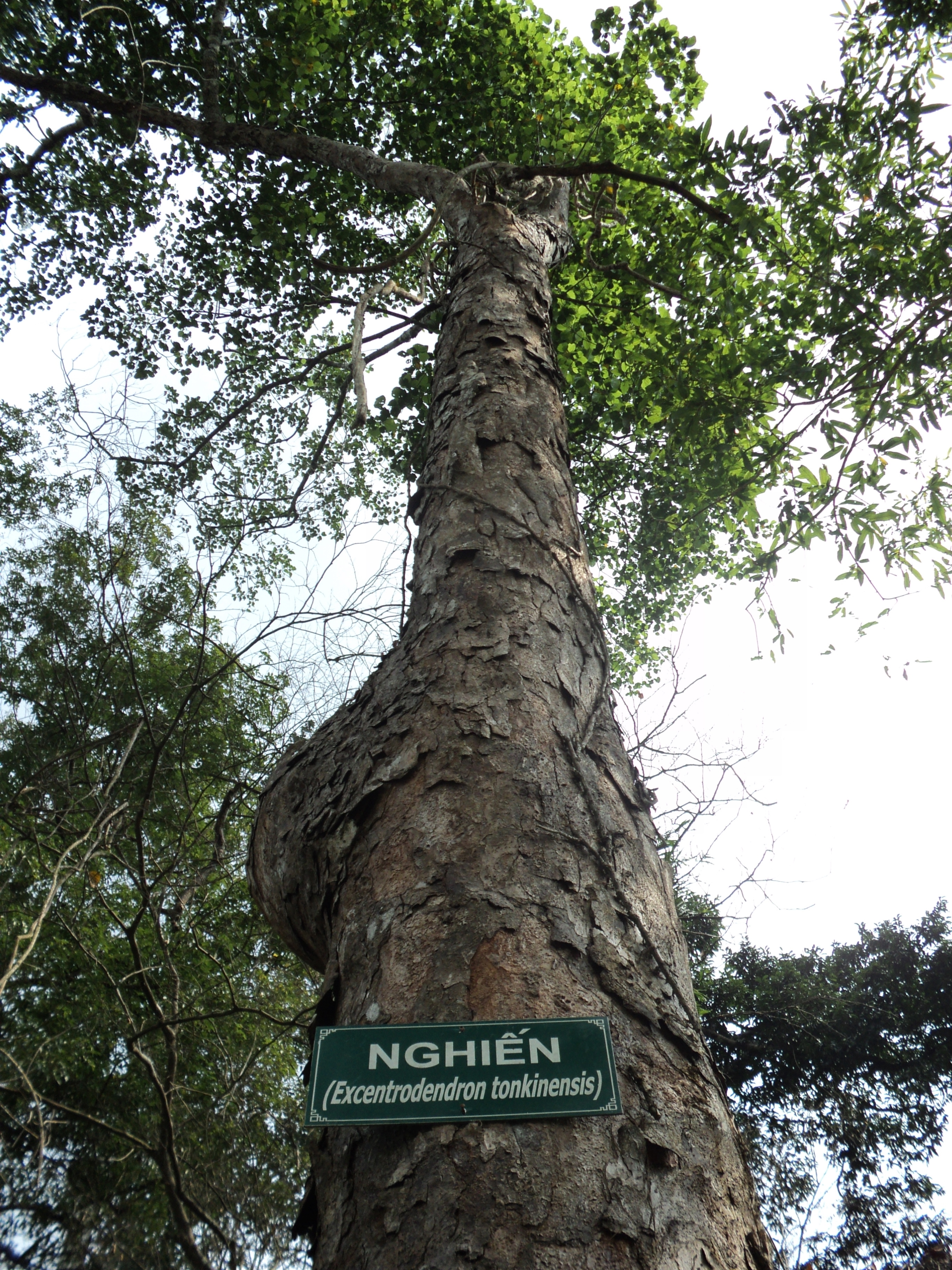

Conservation status
- Near Threatened (IUCN 3.1)

Scientific classification
- Kingdom: Plantae
- Clade: Embryophytes
- Clade: Tracheophytes
- Clade: Angiosperms
- Clade: Eudicots
- Clade: Rosids
- Order: Malvales
- Family: Malvaceae
- Genus: Burretiodendron
- Species: B. tonkinense

Binomial name
- Burretiodendron tonkinense (A.Chev.) Kosterm.

Synonyms
- Excentrodendron tonkinense (A.Chev.) Hung T.Chang & R.H.Miau; Parapentace tonkinensis (A.Chev.) Gagnep. Pentace tonkinensis A.Chev. Burretiodendron hsienmu W.Y.Chun & F.C.How; Excentrodendron hsiemmu (W.Y.Chun & F.C.How) Hung T.Chang & R.H.Miau; Excentrodendron rhombifolium Hung T.Chang & R.H.Miau

= Burretiodendron tonkinense =

Species of plant

Burretiodendron tonkinense is a species of flowering plant in the family Malvaceae. It is native to Vietnam and southern China. It is threatened by habitat loss.
