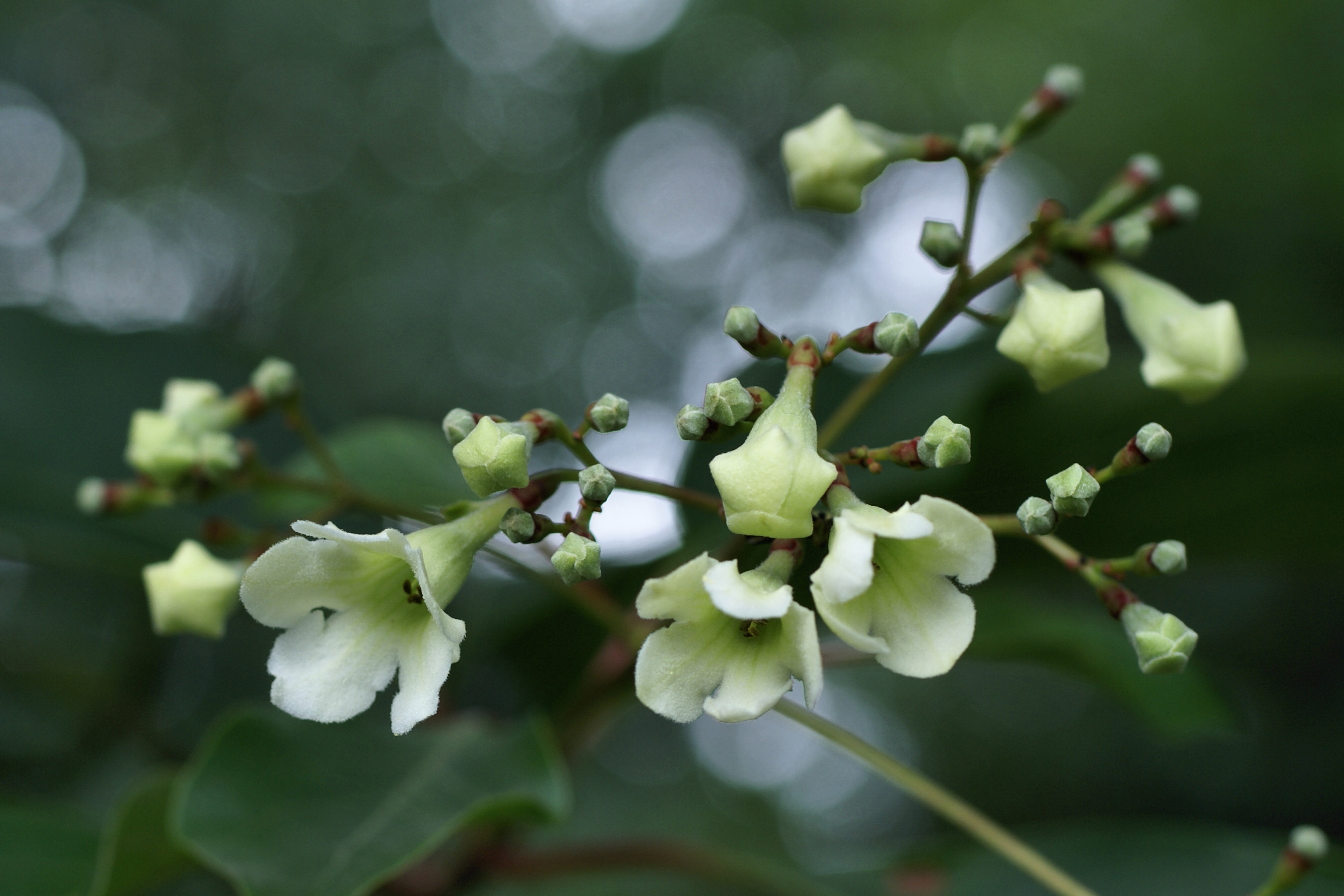
- Emmenopterys henryi flowers

Scientific classification
- Kingdom: Plantae
- Clade: Tracheophytes
- Clade: Angiosperms
- Clade: Eudicots
- Clade: Asterids
- Order: Gentianales
- Family: Rubiaceae
- Subfamily: Ixoroideae
- Tribe: Dialypetalantheae
- Genus: Emmenopterys; Oliv.

Type species
- Emmenopterys henryi Oliv.

= Emmenopterys =

Genus of plants

Emmenopterys is a genus of flowering plants in the family Rubiaceae. The genus is found in China, Burma, Thailand, and Vietnam.

== Species ==
- Emmenopterys henryi Oliv. - China, Vietnam
- Emmenopterys rehderi F.P.Metcalf - Burma, Thailand
