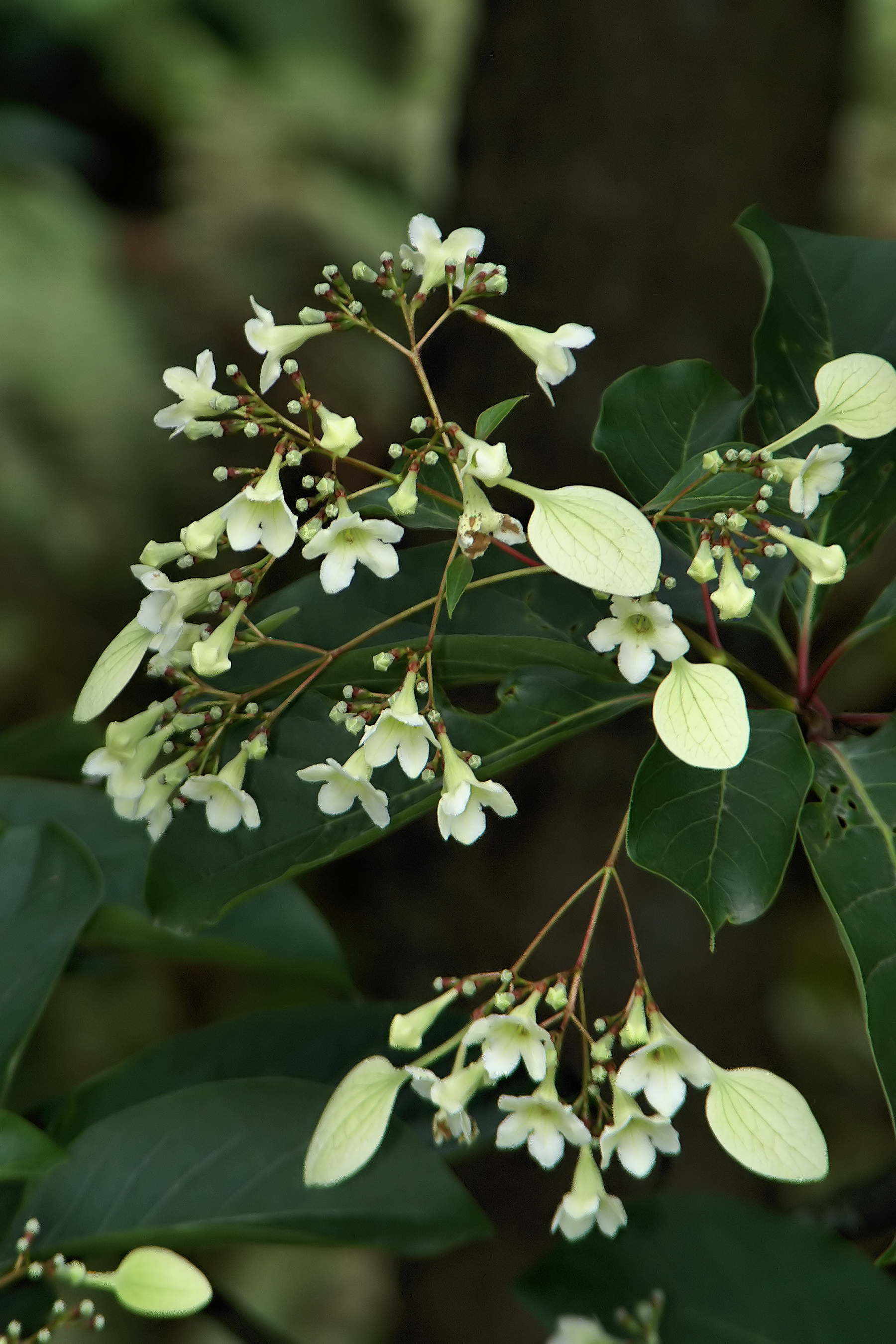

Scientific classification
- Kingdom: Plantae
- Clade: Tracheophytes
- Clade: Angiosperms
- Clade: Eudicots
- Clade: Asterids
- Order: Gentianales
- Family: Rubiaceae
- Genus: Emmenopterys
- Species: E. henryi

Binomial name
- Emmenopterys henryi Oliv.

Synonyms
- Mussaenda cavaleriei H.Lév.; Mussaenda mairei H.Lév.

= Emmenopterys henryi =

Species of plant

Emmenopterys henryi is a species of flowering plant in the family Rubiaceae. It is found in the temperate parts of central and southern China and in Vietnam. It is a deciduous tree with opposite leaves and can attain heights of 45 m (148 ft) and grow to be 1000 years old. The epithet is named after the Irish botanist and sinologist Augustine Henry. The trees may not flower until they are 30–100 years old, and flowering seems to be triggered by a long hot summer. Many inflorescences are accompanied by a large white bract.

== Emmenopterys henryi in Europe ==
The first introduction to Europe was 1907 to England by Ernest Wilson. They are noted for their rare flowering. The first time that Emmenopterys henryi flowered in mainland Europe was 1971 in the arboretum of Villa Taranto on Lago Maggiore, Italy. At Borde Hill Garden, West Sussex, UK there are 2 specimens with the older planted in 1928 from seed collected by George Forrest which flowered in 2011, 2012, 2016 and 2018; the smaller specimen has flowered 3 times and was planted in 1976 from micropropagation of the Kew specimen that was in poor condition due to the drought. A specimen in Cambridge flowered in 2012, after 30 years, only the fifth flowering in the UK. In 2013, a tree flowered for the fourth time in the Arboretum Kalmthout in Belgium. This was unexpected, since the flowers only appeared in September, which is quite late. After the 2018 heatwave in the UK, a 100 year old specimen in Roath Park, Cardiff flowered for the first time ever.
