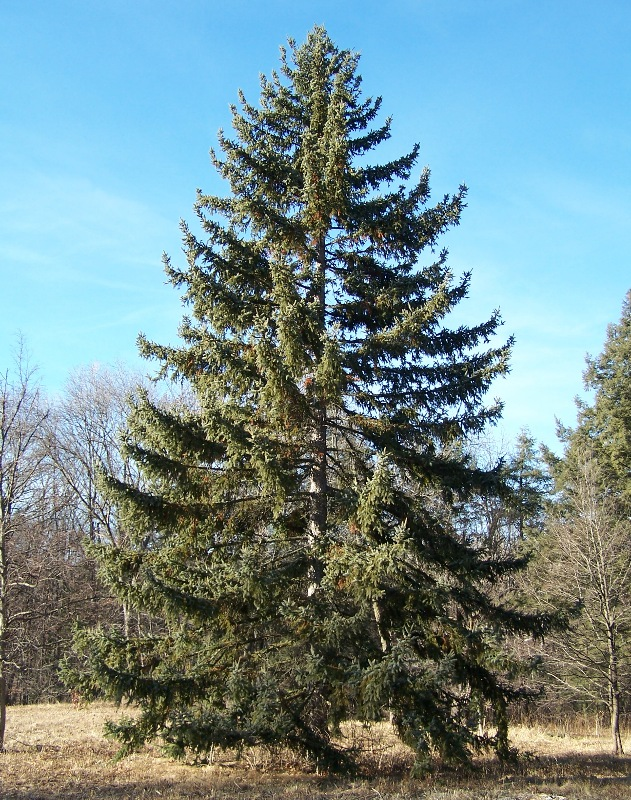
- Cultivated Specimen; Morton Arboretum accession 126-65-1

Conservation status
- Critically Endangered (IUCN 3.1)

Scientific classification
- Kingdom: Plantae
- Clade: Tracheophytes
- Clade: Gymnospermae
- Division: Pinophyta
- Class: Pinopsida
- Order: Pinales
- Family: Pinaceae
- Genus: Picea
- Species: P. koyamae

Binomial name
- Picea koyamae Shiras.

= Picea koyamae =

Species of conifer

Picea koyamae (Koyama's spruce; Japanese: ヤツガタケトウヒ or やつがたけとうひ yatsugatake-touhi) is a rare spruce, endemic to the Akaishi Mountains and Yatsugatake Mountains in central Honshu, Japan. It is an evergreen tree growing to 25 m (82 ft) tall, with a trunk diameter of up to a metre. It grows in small isolated stands in a limited area and the total area of occupation is less than 100 square kilometres (39 sq mi). Trees that are lost to typhoons are normally replaced with other faster-growing species and the International Union for Conservation of Nature has assessed the tree as being "critically endangered". Some trees are in cultivation for their ornamentality.

== Description ==
It is a monoecious evergreen tree growing to 25 m tall, with a trunk diameter of up to 1 m. The shoots are orange-brown, with scattered pubescence. The leaves are needle-like, 8–16 mm long, rhombic in cross-section, dark bluish-green with conspicuous stomatal lines. The cones are cylindric-conic, 4–9 cm long and 2 cm broad, maturing pale brown 5–7 months after pollination, and have stiff, smoothly rounded scales 6–18 mm long and 6–12 mm wide. Pollination takes place in late spring.

== Distribution ==
Koyama's spruce is native to the Akaishi Mountains and Yatsugatake Mountains, or Nagano and Yamanashi Prefectures in central Honshū, Japan, where it grows at 1500–2000 m altitude. It is found growing in groups of 10–20, with a total population of only about 250 mature trees. The main cause of decline is the loss of natural regeneration after typhoons, with windblown trees being replaced by the planting of other faster-growing commercially valuable species. Other threats include wildfires, landslides and changes in temperature and precipitation associated with climate change. There is little genetic exchange between different fragmentary locations where it grows, and the total area of occupation by this tree is less than 100 square kilometres (39 sq mi).

The tree is named after the Japanese botanist Mitsua Koyama. The name was first published as "koyamai", but this is an orthographical error to be corrected under the provisions of ICBN Article 60.

It is occasionally planted as an ornamental tree. The wood is similar to that of other spruces, but the species is too rare to be of economic value.

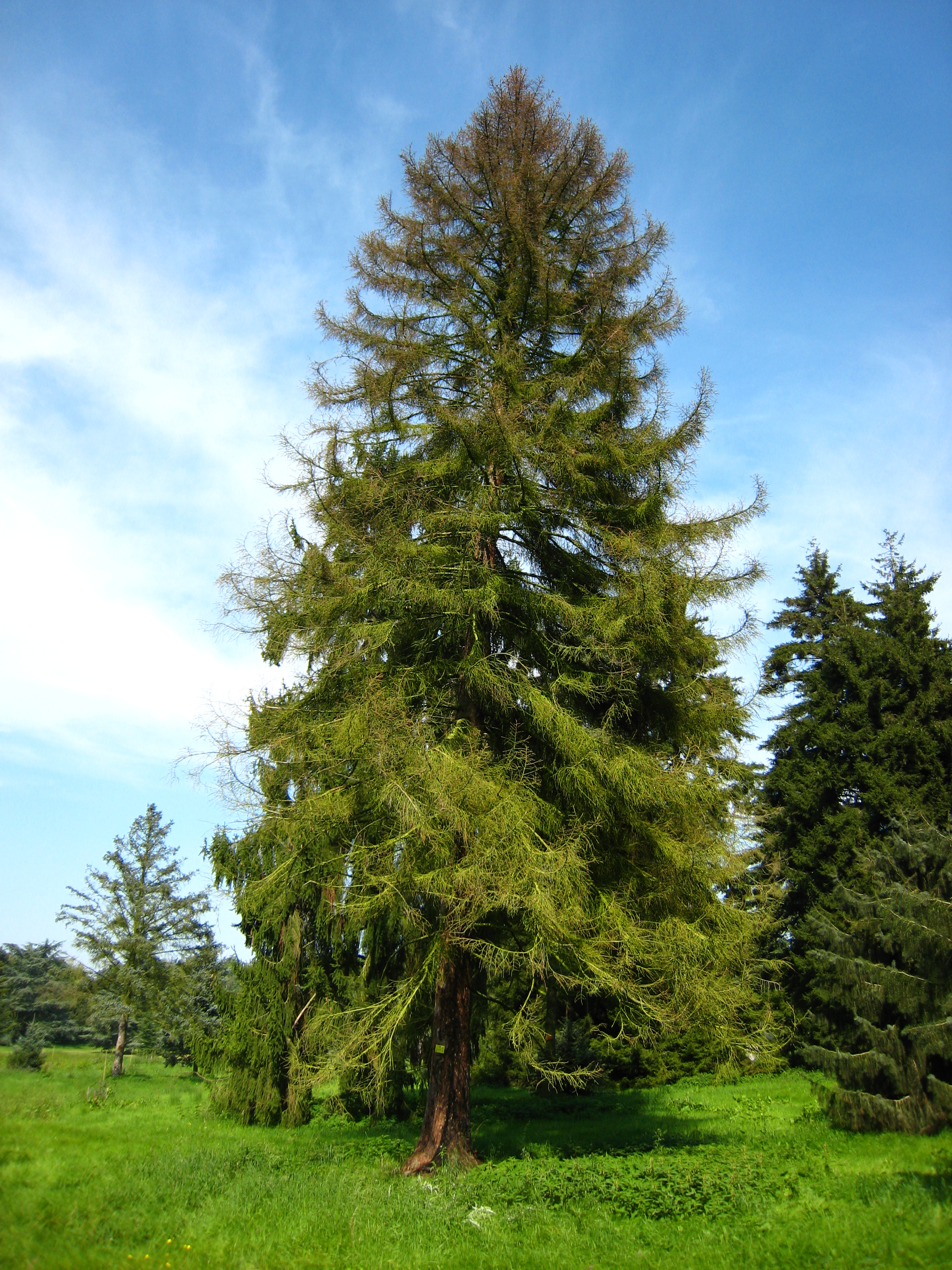
Recently dead specimen in the Arboretum de Chèvreloup, France

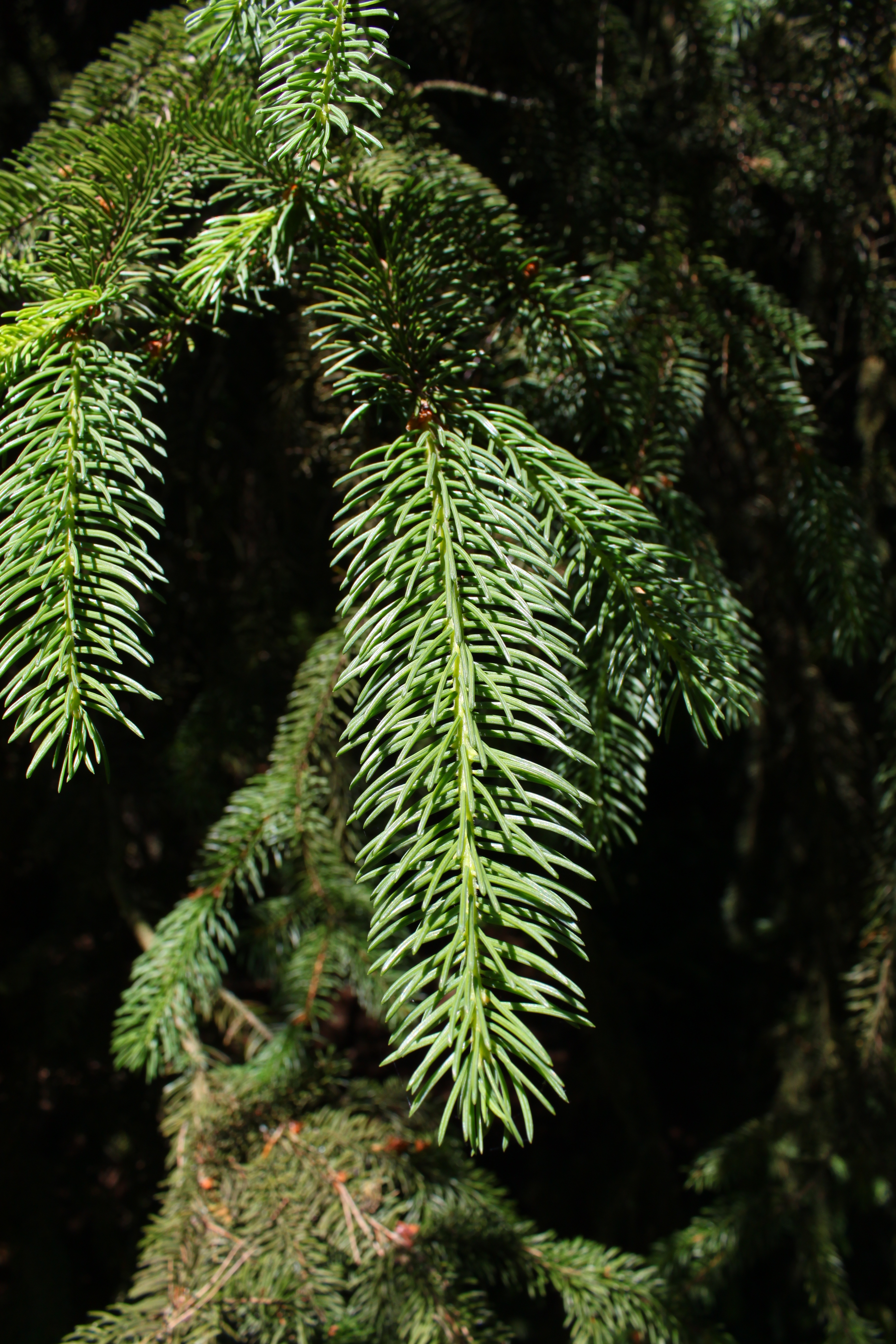
Young shoot, Arboretum in Rogów, Poland

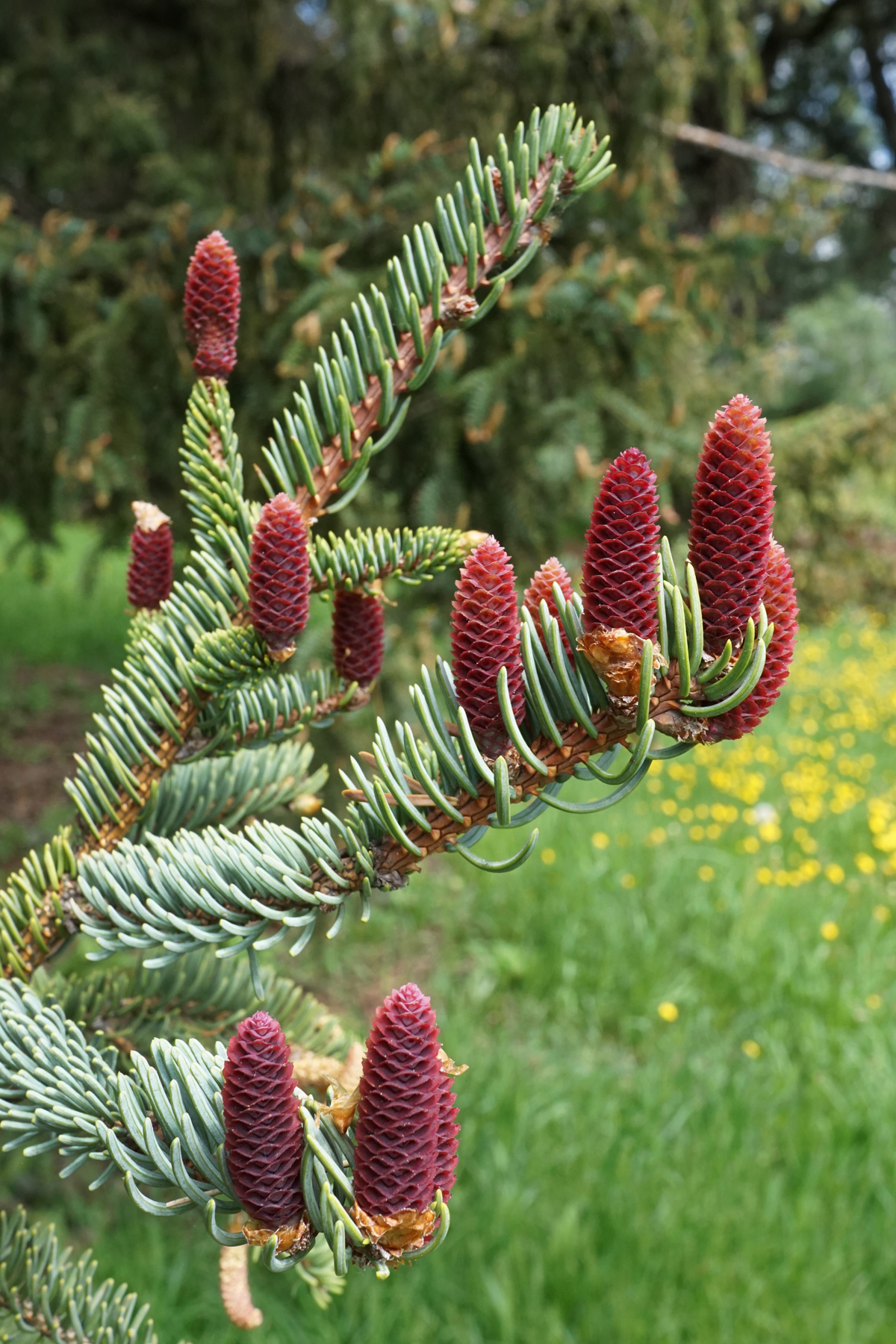
Immature cones
