= Sheila Pim =

Irish crime novelist (1909–1995)

- Born: 21 September 1909; Dublin, Ireland
- Died: 16 December 1995 (aged 86)
- Education: Girton College
- Known for: Crime novels

Sheila Pim (21 September 1909 – 16 December 1995) was an Irish crime novelist and horticulturalist.

== Biography ==
Sheila Pim was born in September 1909 to a Quaker father and English mother in Ireland. She was a twin but her brother died. She was sent to the French School in Bray before being sent to Lausanne, Switzerland to Finishing school. Pim then went on to Girton College, Cambridge to study modern languages, intending to graduate with a degree in French and Italian. Her mother's ill heath, and death in 1940, caused her to return to Ireland to look after her and she remained taking care of her father, who died in 1958, and an older incapacitated brother, Tom.

During the 1950s and 1960s Pim wrote seven novels, mostly crime fiction in a light hearted style. During this time she was a member of Irish PEN. She was also an avid amateur horticulturalist and wrote for the magazine My Garden. Her more serious undertaking was a biography of the Irish plant collector Augustine Henry. Her brother Tom died in 1964 in an accident leaving Pim with no further responsibilities. This allowed her to spend significant time researching through Henry's papers. This book was published in 1966.

When she had completed the biography Pim focused on philanthropy. She dedicated her time to the Friends Historical Society and was particularly interested in helping out in the traveller community. She supported a young group of children and their grandfather. They brought her considerable joy. The Royal Horticultural Society of Ireland awarded Pim the Society's Medal of Honour and made her an honorary life member for her services to the study of horticulture. As she got older she went deaf finally forcing her to move into sheltered housing where she died in 1995.

== Bibliography ==
=== Fiction ===
- Common Or Garden Crime (Hodder and Stoughton, London, 1945)
- Creeping Venom (Hodder and Stoughton, London, 1946)
- The Flowering Shamrock (Hodder and Stoughton, London, 1949)
- A Brush With Death (Hodder and Stoughton, London, 1950)
- A Hive of Suspects (Hodder and Stoughton, London, 1952)
- Other People's Business (Hodder and Stoughton, London, 1957)
- The Sheltered Garden (Hodder and Stoughton, London, 1964)

=== Non-Fiction ===
- Getting Better: A Handbook for Convalescents (Faber & Faber, London, 1943)
- Bringing the Garden Indoors (My Garden, London, 1949)
- The Wood and the Trees: A Biography of Augustine Henry (Macdonald, London, 1966)
