= Burretiodendron esquirolii =

Conservation status
- Vulnerable (IUCN 2.3)

Scientific classification
- Kingdom: Plantae
- Clade: Tracheophytes
- Clade: Angiosperms
- Clade: Eudicots
- Clade: Rosids
- Order: Malvales
- Family: Malvaceae
- Genus: Burretiodendron
- Species: B. esquirolii

Binomial name
- Burretiodendron esquirolii (Leveille) Rehder

Species of tree

Burretiodendron esquirolii is a species of flowering plant in the family Malvaceae. It is found in China, Myanmar, and Thailand. It is threatened by habitat loss.
