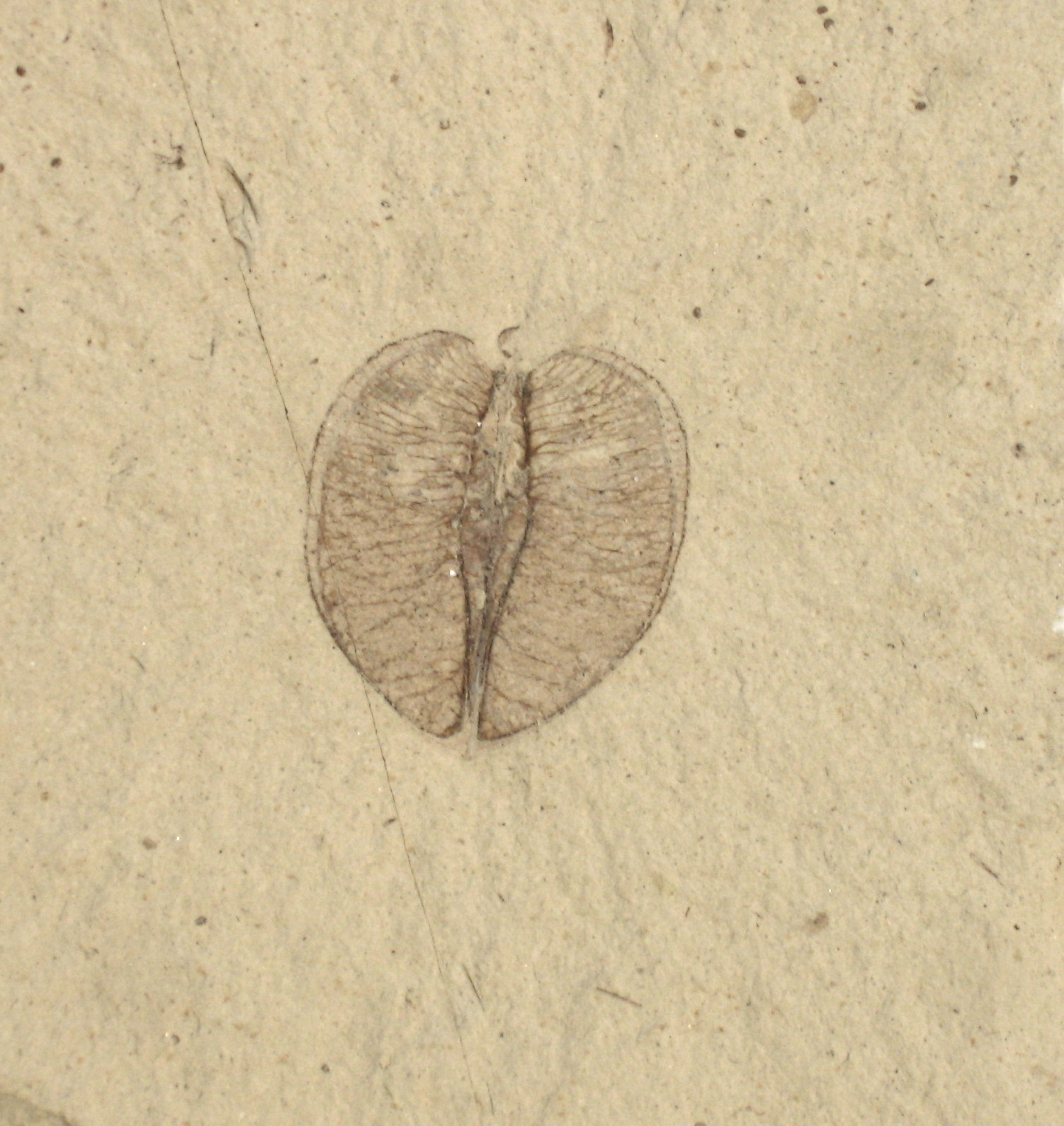
- Fossil Craigia fruit, 49ma, Washington, USA

Scientific classification
- Kingdom: Plantae
- Clade: Tracheophytes
- Clade: Angiosperms
- Clade: Eudicots
- Clade: Rosids
- Order: Malvales
- Family: Malvaceae
- Subfamily: Tilioideae
- Genus: Craigia; W.W.Sm. & W.E.Evans

= Craigia =

Craigia Temporal range: Paleocene–Recent

Genus of flowering plants

Craigia is a genus of flowering plants in the family Malvaceae sensu lato or Tiliaceae.

These are deciduous trees with toothed leaves, bisexual flowers that lack petals, and winged capsules.

There are two extant species and three extinct species known from fossils. Though the genus was once widespread across the Northern Hemisphere, the extant species are limited to southern China and Vietnam. The oldest species are known from the Paleocene of Sakhalin.

Species:

- †Craigia bronnii
- †Craigia hainanensis
- Craigia kwangsiensis H.H.Hsue
- †Craigia oregonensis
- Craigia yunnanensis W.W.Sm. & W.E.Evans
