= La Romieu =

- Commune
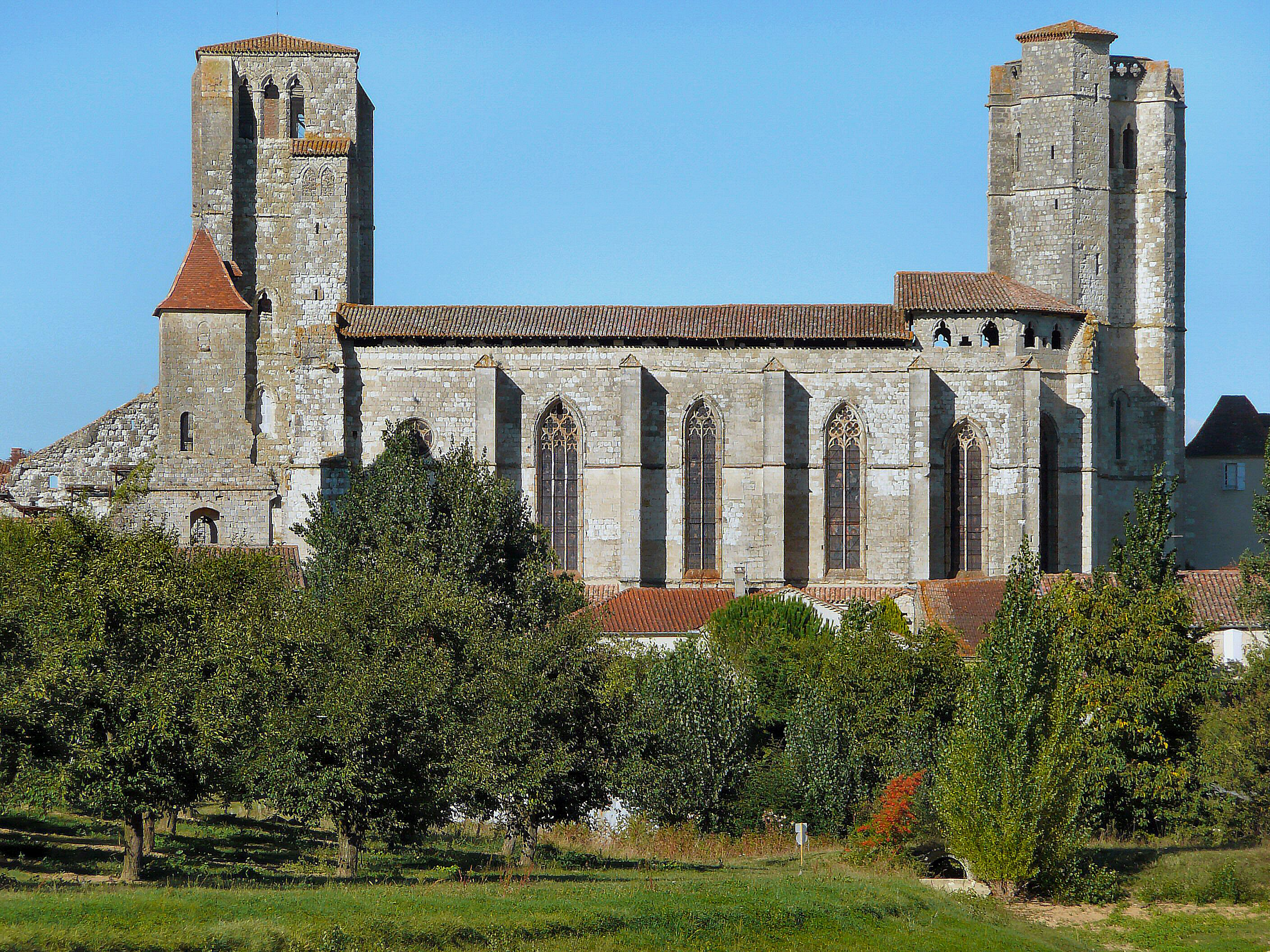
- St. Peter's collegiate church

- Coat of arms
- Location of La Romieu
- Location within France Location within Occitanie
- Coordinates: 43°58′58″N 0°29′55″E
- Country: France
- Region: Occitania
- Department: Gers
- Arrondissement: Condom
- Canton: Lectoure-Lomagne
- Intercommunality: Lomagne Gersoise

Government
  - Mayor (2020–2026): Thierry Cambournac
- Area^{1}: 27.48 km^{2} (10.61 sq mi)
- Elevation: 187 m (614 ft)
- Highest elevation: 217 m (712 ft)
- Lowest elevation: 104 m (341 ft)
- Population (2023): 540
  - Density: 20/km^{2} (51/sq mi)
- Time zone: UTC+01:00 (CET)
  - Summer (DST): UTC+02:00 (CEST)
- INSEE/Postal code: 32345 /32480
- ^{1} French Land Register data, which excludes lakes, ponds, glaciers > 1 km^{2} (0.386 sq mi or 247 acres) and river estuaries.

La Romieu (French pronunciation: [la ʁɔmjø]; Occitan: L'Arromiu) is a commune in the Gers department in southwestern France. It is a member of Les Plus Beaux Villages de France (The Most Beautiful Villages of France) Association.

It is known for Collégiale St. Pierre, a 14th-century church with a cloister and a tower.

== Geography ==
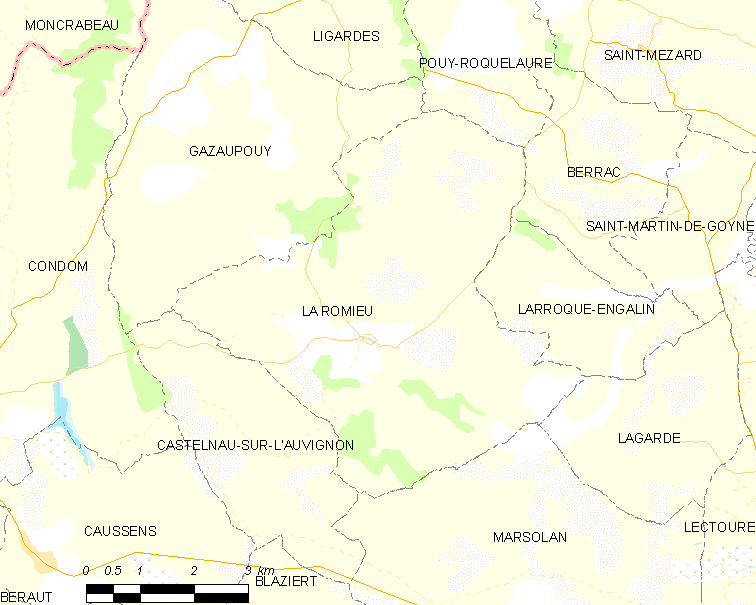
La Romieu and its surrounding communes

== Population ==
Historical population
| Year | Pop. | ±% p.a. |
|---|---|---|
| 1968 | 644 | — |
| 1975 | 535 | −2.61% |
| 1982 | 547 | +0.32% |
| 1990 | 528 | −0.44% |
| 1999 | 532 | +0.08% |
| 2007 | 539 | +0.16% |
| 2012 | 573 | +1.23% |
| 2017 | 575 | +0.07% |
| 2023 | 540 | −1.04% |
Source: INSEE

== Sights ==
- Collegiate Church of St. Peter of Romieu
- Jardins de Coursiana

== See also ==
- Communes of the Gers department
