= Ulmus 'Monstrosa' =

Elm cultivar

- Genus: Ulmus
- Cultivar: 'Monstrosa'
- Origin: France

The elm cultivar Ulmus 'Monstrosa' [: "monstrous", "strange"], a shrub-elm with fasciated branching, is believed to have originated in France, where it was first listed by Lavallée in Arboretum Segrezianum (1877) as a form of Field Elm, Ulmus campestris var. monstrosa, but without description. Though its long slender 2 cm petiole is not a feature of wych elm U. glabra Huds., and is even less likely in a shrub form of this species, the wych-cultivar error arose early, perhaps because the Späth nursery of Berlin, using Ulmus montana both for some Ulmus × hollandica cultivars and for wych varieties, listed it c.1890 as Ulmus montana monstrosa. Hartwig in Illustrirtes Gehölzbuch (1892) followed with Ulmus scabra monstrosa, an error repeated by Krüssman (1962) and by Green (1964), with their U. glabra Huds. 'Monstrosa'. The specimen in the Belmonte Arboretum, Wageningen, was reclassified as a field elm in 1962.

'Monstrosa' was sometimes referred to as Ulmus scabra [:glabra Huds.] f. nana monstrosa Schneid., leading to confusion with the more common (and still cultivated) dwarf elm Ulmus glabra 'Nana' (see 'Cultivation'). Späth in his late 19th and early 20th century catalogues listed and described Ulmus montana monstrosa separately from Ulmus montana nana.

== Description ==
'Monstrosa' was described as a compact shrub, with branchlets often fasciated, and leaves 5–8 cm long, partly pitcher-shaped at the base, on slender stalks < 25 mm long. A herbarium specimen shows that "fasciated" in this context refers to bunched terminal shoots, not to the botanical phenomenon of fasciation. This description of the cultivar as a compact shrub, however, dates from its early days in cultivation; further, the ultimate size of 'Monstrosa', if it survives, is unknown.

== Pests and diseases ==
The degree of the tree's susceptibility to Dutch elm disease (DED) is unknown. It has been noted that shrub-elms are usually less prone to infection.

== Cultivation ==
No specimens are known to survive. U. montana monstrosa was introduced to the Dominion Arboretum, Ottawa, Canada, probably from Späth, in 1899. A specimen obtained from Späth as U. montana monstrosa and planted in 1916, stood in the Ryston Hall arboretum, Norfolk, in the early 20th century. There were specimens in Arnold Arboretum, Massachusetts, and in Belmonte Arboretum, Wageningen, in the mid-20th century.

The shrub elm sold in the Netherlands as 'Monstrosa' is the cultivar 'Nana'. 'Nana Monstrosa' was an old synonym of 'Monstrosa'.

== Synonymy ==
- Ulmus campestris var. monstrosa: Lavallée, Arboretum Segrezianum 235, 1877
- Ulmos scabra var. monstrosa, Hartwig, Illustrirtes Gehölzbuch ed. 2, 294, 1892.
- Ulmus scabra (: glabra) var. monstrosa Hort.; Krüssmann, Handbuch der Laubgehölze 2: 536, 1962, as a cultivar.
- Ulmus scabra (:glabra) f. nana monstrosa Schneid.
