= Yasuyoshi Shirasawa =

Japanese botanist (1868–1947)

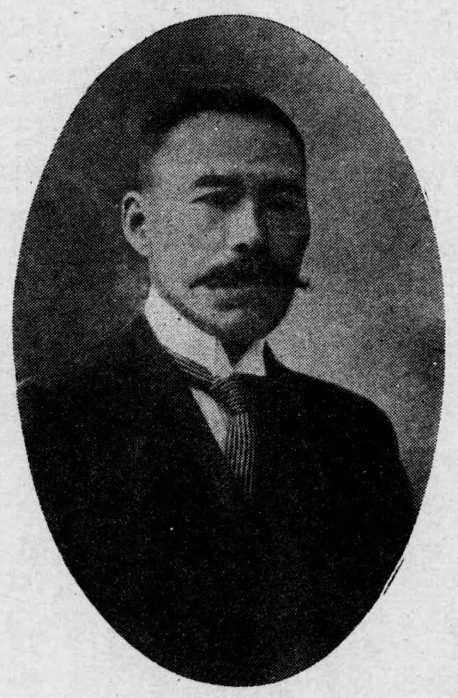
Portrait of Yasumi Shirasawa

Yasuyoshi Shirasawa (白沢 保美, Shirasawa Yasuyoshi, 1868 – December 20, 1947), also known as Homi Shirasawa, was a Japanese botanist who worked alongside Tomitaro Makino 'The Father of Japanese Botany', at the University of Tokyo. Shirasawa named numerous native plants, notably the endangered Picea koyamae and (with Makino) the Kyūshū Lime Tilia kiusiana.
