= Craigia kwangsiensis =

Conservation status
- Critically Endangered (IUCN 2.3)

Scientific classification
- Kingdom: Plantae
- Clade: Tracheophytes
- Clade: Angiosperms
- Clade: Eudicots
- Clade: Rosids
- Order: Malvales
- Family: Malvaceae
- Genus: Craigia
- Species: C. kwangsiensis

Binomial name
- Craigia kwangsiensis Hsue

Species of flowering plant

Craigia kwangsiensis is a species of flowering plant in the family Malvaceae sensu lato or Tiliaceae. It is found only in China.
