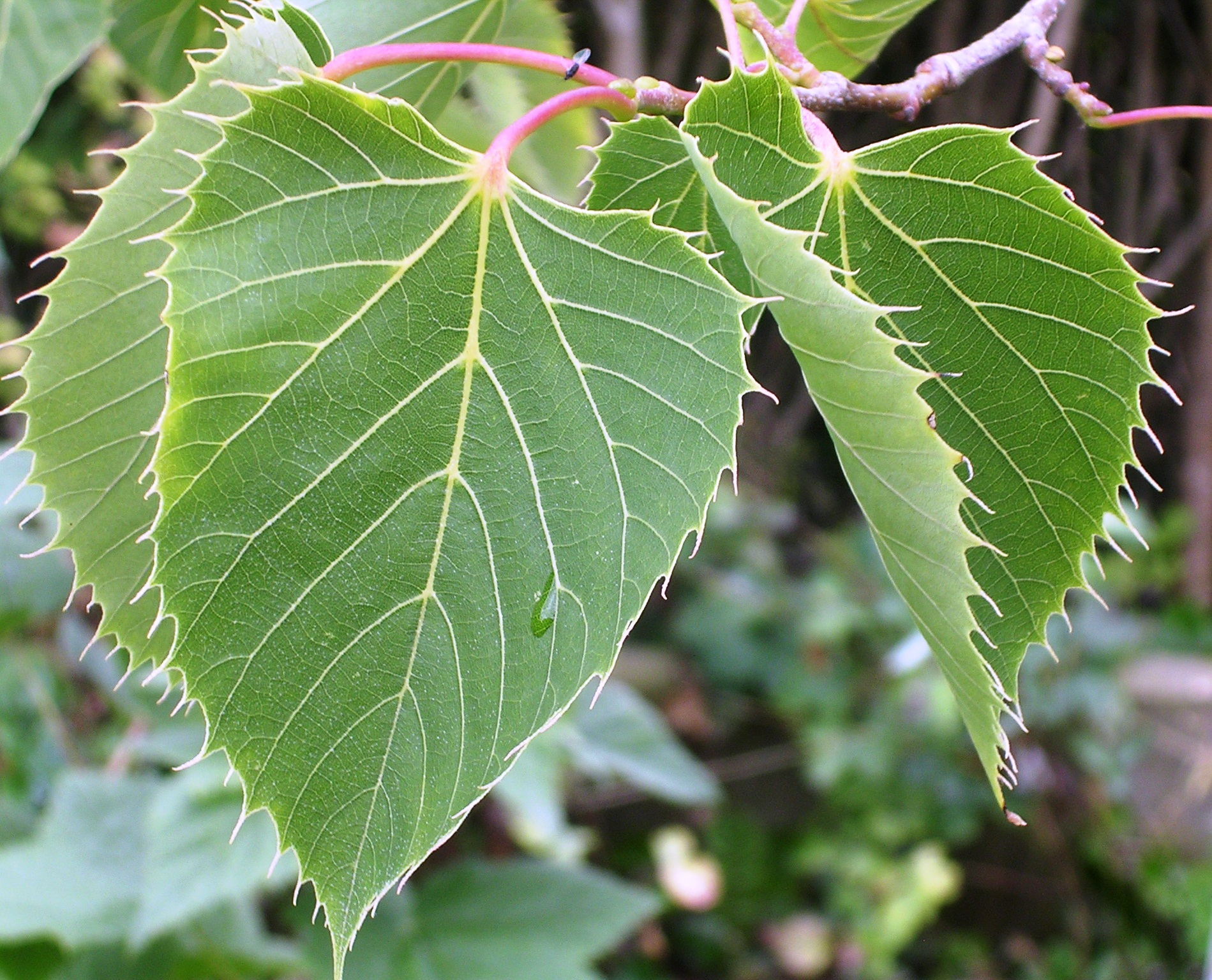
- Leaves of Henry's lime in midsummer

Scientific classification
- Kingdom: Plantae
- Clade: Tracheophytes
- Clade: Angiosperms
- Clade: Eudicots
- Clade: Rosids
- Order: Malvales
- Family: Malvaceae
- Genus: Tilia
- Species: T. henryana

Binomial name
- Tilia henryana Szyszyl.

= Tilia henryana =

Henry's lime

Species of tree

Tilia henryana Szyszyl., commonly known as Henry's lime, is a species of tree native to the Chinese provinces of Anhui, Henan, Hubei, Hunan, Jiangsu, Jiangxi, Shaanxi, and Zhejiang. It was introduced to the West by Ernest Wilson in 1901, and is named after the Irish plantsman and sinologist Augustine Henry, who collected the type specimen in 1888.

== Description ==
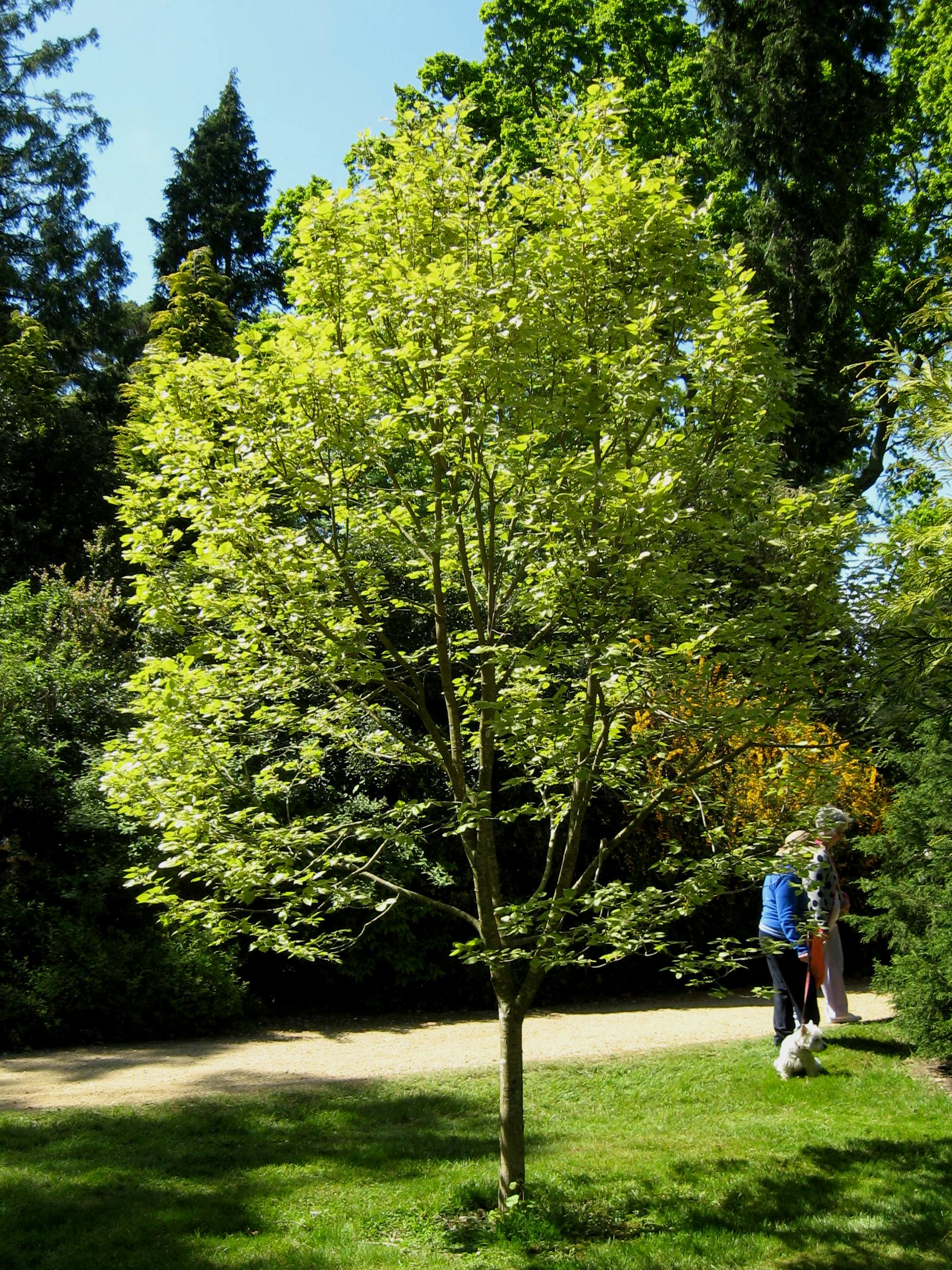
Henry's lime, Exbury

Henry's lime is a deciduous tree growing to 25 m in height, its bark pale grey and fissured. The sea green leaves are cordate, < 10 cm long, with distinctive ciliate margins, and are borne on 3–5 cm petioles. The tiny pale, almost white, fragrant flowers appear in clusters of up to 20 in autumn.

== Cultivation ==
The original clone in commerce grew very slowly, but faster-growing clones are now available. The tree performs best in sheltered locations.

=== Notable trees ===
The TROBI Champion grows at Birr Castle, Co. Offaly, Ireland; planted in 1946 it measured 15 m tall by 44 cm d.b.h. in 2010.

== Varieties ==
Two varieties are accepted by Plants of the World Online, T. h. var. henryana and T. h. var. subglabra, principally distinguished by branchlets that are yellow, stellate tomentose, and glabrous, resp.
