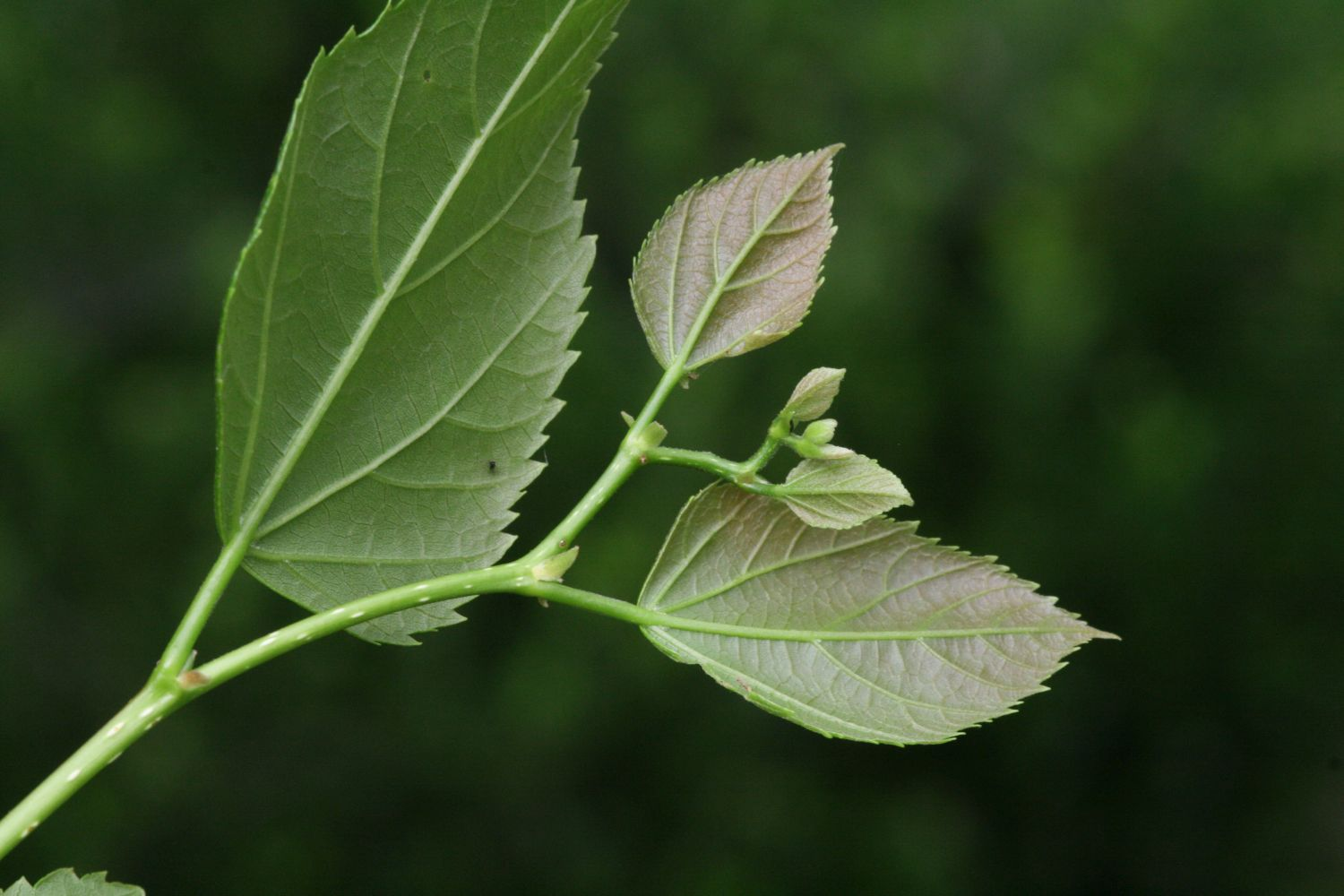
- Abaxial surfaces of leaves

Conservation status
- Least Concern (IUCN 3.1)

Scientific classification
- Kingdom: Plantae
- Clade: Embryophytes
- Clade: Tracheophytes
- Clade: Spermatophytes
- Clade: Angiosperms
- Clade: Eudicots
- Clade: Rosids
- Order: Malvales
- Family: Malvaceae
- Genus: Tilia
- Species: T. kiusiana

Binomial name
- Tilia kiusiana Makino & Shiras.

Synonyms
- Tilia distans Nath.

= Tilia kiusiana =

Species of flowering plant

Tilia kiusiana, the Kyushu lime, is a species of flowering plant in the family Malvaceae. It is native to southern and central Japan, and introduced to the Korean Peninsula. It has a number of features that make it "potentially the next great landscape tree", including small, narrow leaves that are not the typical linden shape, a refined growth habit, attractive exfoliating bark, aphid resistance, and slow growth to a medium size. Hardy to zone 6, it is available from commercial nurseries.
