= Mortoniodendron =

Mortoniodendron Temporal range: Eocene–Recent

Scientific classification
- Kingdom: Plantae
- Clade: Tracheophytes
- Clade: Angiosperms
- Clade: Eudicots
- Clade: Rosids
- Order: Malvales
- Family: Malvaceae
- Genus: Mortoniodendron; Standl. & Steyerm.

Synonyms
- Orthandra Burret; Westphalina A.Robyns & Bamps

Species of flowering plant

Mortoniodendron is a genus of flowering plants belonging to the family Malvaceae.

Its native range is southern Mexico to Colombia. It is also found in Costa Rica, El Salvador, Guatemala, Honduras, Mexico, Nicaragua and Panamá. Fossils indicate that it has been in its present range since the Miocene. Eocene-aged pollen from Europe and Southern China attributable to the genus indicate a wider distribution in the Northern Hemisphere in the past.

The genus name of Mortoniodendron is in honour of Conrad Vernon Morton (1905–1972), an American botanist who did notable writings on Ferns. It was first described and published in Publ. Field Mus. Nat. Hist., Bot. Series 17 on page 411 in 1938.

== Known species ==
According to Kew:

- Mortoniodendron abelianum Al.Rodr.
- Mortoniodendron anisophyllum (Standl.) Standl. & Steyerm.
- Mortoniodendron apetalum Al.Rodr.
- Mortoniodendron cauliflorum Al.Rodr.
- Mortoniodendron costaricense Standl. & L.O.Williams
- Mortoniodendron guatemalense Standl. & Steyerm.
- Mortoniodendron hirsutum Standl.
- Mortoniodendron longipedunculatum Al.Rodr.
- Mortoniodendron membranaceum Standl. & Steyerm.
- Mortoniodendron ocotense Ishiki & T.Wendt
- Mortoniodendron palaciosii Miranda
- Mortoniodendron pentagonum (Donn.Sm.) Miranda
- Mortoniodendron ruizii Miranda
- Mortoniodendron sulcatum Lundell
- Mortoniodendron uxpanapense Dorr & T.Wendt
- Mortoniodendron vestitum Lundell
