= Craigia yunnanensis =

Conservation status
- Endangered (IUCN 2.3)

Scientific classification
- Kingdom: Plantae
- Clade: Tracheophytes
- Clade: Angiosperms
- Clade: Eudicots
- Clade: Rosids
- Order: Malvales
- Family: Malvaceae
- Genus: Craigia
- Species: C. yunnanensis

Binomial name
- Craigia yunnanensis W.W.Sm. & W.E.Evans (1921)

Synonyms
- Burretiodendron combretoides W.Y.Chun & F.C.How (1956); Burretiodendron yunnanense Kosterm. (1961)

Species of flowering plant

Craigia yunnanensis is a species of flowering plant in the family Malvaceae. It is a tree native to south-central China (western and southeastern Yunnan, western Guangxi, and southern Guizhou), southeastern Tibet, and northern Vietnam. It is threatened by habitat loss.
