= Augustine Henry =

Irish sinologist and botanist (1857–1930)

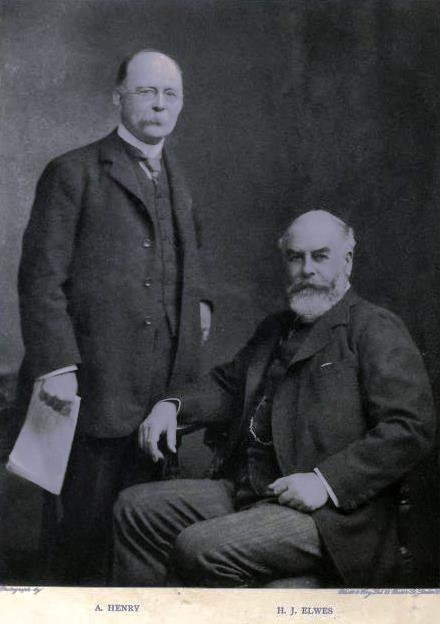
Augustine Henry (left), and Henry John Elwes

Augustine Henry (2 July 1857 – 23 March 1930) was a British-born Irish plantsman and sinologist. He is best known for sending over 15,000 dry specimens and seeds and 500 plant samples to Kew Gardens in the United Kingdom. By 1930, he was a recognised authority and was honoured with society membership in Belgium, Czechoslovakia, Finland, France, and Poland. In 1929 the Botanical Institute of Peking dedicated to him the second volume of Icones plantarum Sinicarum, a collection of plant drawings. In 1935, John William Besant was to write: 'The wealth of beautiful trees and flowering shrubs which adorn gardens in all temperate parts of the world today is due in a great measure to the pioneer work of the late Professor Henry'.

== Early life and education ==
Henry was born on 2 July 1857 in Dundee, Scotland to Bernard (a flax merchant) and Mary (née McNamee) Henry; the family returned to Cookstown, County Tyrone, shortly afterwards. Educated at Cookstown Academy and later Queens College Galway (B.A.), Queens College, Belfast (M.A.) 1879 to study medicine, Henry transferred his studies to University of Edinburgh to finish his degree sooner and duly qualified as a doctor. At some stage, he came in contact with Sir Robert Hart who encouraged him to join the Imperial Customs Service in China.

Henry entered the Imperial Customs Service in Shanghai in 1881 as Assistant Medical Officer and Customs Assistant. He was sent to the remote posting of Yichang (Ichanh) in 1882 in Hubei Province, Central China, to investigate plants used in Chinese medicine. He also served in Hubei, Sichuan, Simao (Yunnan), Mengzi and Taiwan. Later in his Chinese career he studied Law and became a member of the Middle Temple. Henry had studied Chinese before going to China and gained a great proficiency in the language. Henry retired with the rank of Mandarin.

== Plantsman career ==
While at Yichang and in other parts of China he collected plants, seeds and specimens, many of which had not been known until then. He also collaborated with at least one local person to collect specimens, a person by the name of "Ho" (as seen on specimen labels). In 1888 he published a list of Chinese plants for the Journal of the Royal Asiatic Society. At that time the flora and fauna of China was not well known. By 1896, 25 new genera and 500 new species had been identified from his specimens. Henry sent over 15,000 dry specimens and seed to Kew Gardens and 500 plant samples; many of these later became well known garden plants. He named 19 of them, including Aconitum hemsleyanum after William Botting Hemsley of Kew. His personal herbarium from China and Taiwan, consisting of ca. 8,000 sheets, was purchased by The New York Botanical Garden in 1901, using contributions from members of the Garden. At the time, it was described as "the best herbarium series representing the Chinese flora in America."

Henry gave instructions to the plant collector Ernest Wilson on where to collect Davidia involucrata, originally discovered by the French missionary priest Père Armand David. On his return to Europe he spent some time working on his own introductions at the Royal Botanic Garden Kew.

In 1900, Henry went to France to study at the French National School of Forestry at Nancy. He later became joint author with Henry John Elwes of the 7 volume Trees of Great Britain and Ireland 1907–13. His contribution here was unique insofar as he devised a system of identification based on leaves and twigs and on the position of buds to aid identification even in the absence of fruit and flowers. He was involved in the establishment of the Chair of Forestry at Cambridge University in 1907, and remained there until 1913. He was responsible, with A.C. Forbes, the Director of Forestry at the Department of Agriculture and Technical Instruction, for the lay-out of 1-acre (4,000 m^{2}) plots of trees at Avondale, County Wicklow.

== Celtic Revival ==
Henry had an interest in the Arts and Crafts movement and in the Celtic Revival. He knew the poet W. B. Yeats, George William Russell (AE), Charlotte, wife of George Bernard Shaw, and was acquainted with the families of Sir Roger Casement and Erskine Childers.

== Royal College of Science, Dublin ==
He took up the Chair of Forestry at the Royal College of Science (later University College Dublin), in 1913 and assisted later in setting up a National Forestry Service.

== Family life ==
Henry married Alice Brunton in 1908; they did not have children.

== Works ==
- Henry, Augustine (1887). "Chinese Names of Plants, Part I". Journal of the China Branch of the Royal Asiatic Society. 22: 233–283. hdl:2027/njp.32101073674358.
- The Trees of Great Britain and Ireland 1907–13, co-author H. J. Elwes. Private (subscription only) publication. Edinburgh.
- Notes on Economic Botany of China, introduction by E. Charles Nelson, Boethus Press 1986 ISBN 0-86314-097-1
- Anthropological work on Lolos and non-Han Chinese of Western Yunnan

== Botanical Legacy ==
The following plants are named after Augustine Henry:

- Aconitum henryi (Sparks Variety Monkshood)
- Clematis henryi
- Emmenopterys henryi
- Illicium henryi
- Lilium henryi
- Lonicera henryi
- Parthenocissus henryana
- Rhododendron augustinii
- Saruma henryi
- Tilia henryana
- Viburnum henryi

Specimens collected by Henry are found in herbaria worldwide, including the National Herbarium of Ireland in the National Botanic Gardens of Ireland, and the National Herbarium of Victoria (MEL), Royal Botanic Gardens Victoria.

== Bibliography ==
- Bretschneider. (1898) History of European Botanical Discoveries in China, 1898 London.
- Lamb, K. & Bowe, P. (1995). A History of Gardening in Ireland. The Botanic Gardens 1995, ISBN 0-7076-1666-2
- Nelson, E. C. (2000). A Heritage of Beauty, An Illustrated Encyclopaedia, Annex X11 – Augustine Henry's Plants, 309–324. Irish Garden Plant Society 2000 ISBN 0-9515890-1-6.
- Pim, S. (1984). The Wood and the Trees Augustine Henry, Boethus Press, ISBN 0-86314-097-1
- Smyth, N. (2002). Augustine Henry's Chinese expeditions. Trinity College Dublin.
