= Ignaz von Szyszyłowicz =

Polish botanist (1857–1910)

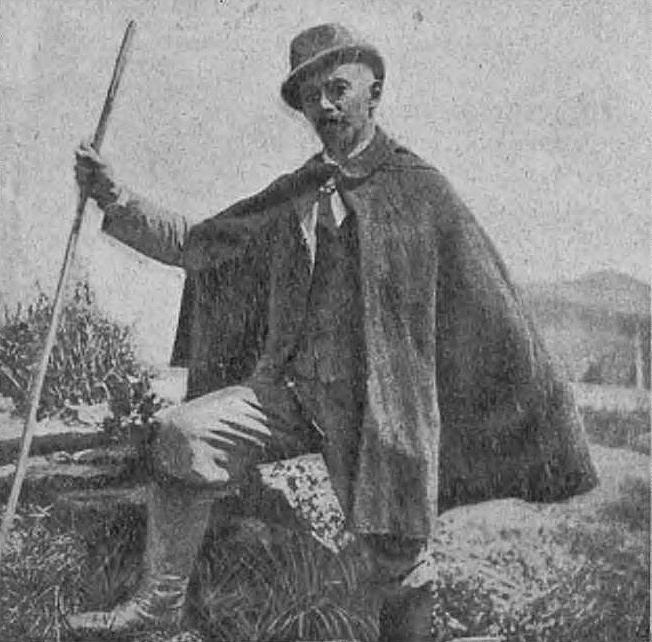
- von Szyszyłowicz before 1901
- Born: Ignaz von Szyszyłowicz; 30 July 1857
- Died: 17 February 1910 (aged 52)

Ignaz von Szyszyłowicz (30 July 1857 – 17 February 1910) also known as Ignacy Szyszyłowicz was a Polish botanist born in Granica (Sosnowiec). He contributed Part III.6 Caryocaraceae, Marcgraviaceae, Theaceae, Strasburgeriaceae to Engler & Prantl's Die natürlichen Pflanzenfamilien (The Natural Plant Families), (Leipzig, 1887).

Szyszyłowicz was a volunteer assistant at the Hofmuseum Wien during the period 1885–1891, professor of botany and director of the Agricultural College at Lemberg during 1891–1909, and inspector of agricultural schools in Galicia in 1898. Szyszyłowicz died in Lemberg.

== Publications ==
- "Polypetalae disciflorae Rehmannianae (Polypet. disc. Rehm.):sive, Enumeratio Linearum, Malpighiacearum, Zygophyllearum, etc. a A. Rehmann annis 1875–1880 in Africa australi extratropica collectarum" based on material collected by Anton Rehmann during 1875–1880 on a trip to South Africa. Rehmann's collections were chiefly from Natal and the Transvaal.
