= Greenland (amusement park) =

Amusement park in Japan

- Previously known as Mitsui Greenland
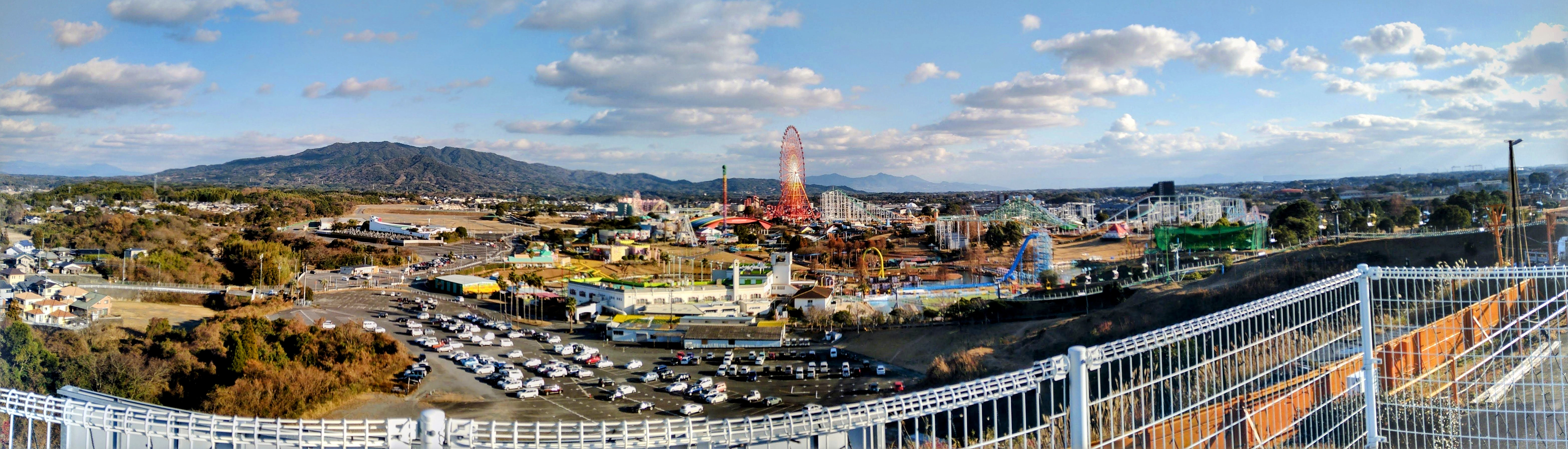
- View from the park's "Panorama Mountain"
- Interactive map of Greenland
- Location: Arao, Kumamoto, Japan
- Coordinates: 32.989°N 130.465°E
- Public transit: Arao Station
- Opened: July 1966
- Owner: Greenland Resort Co., Ltd.
- Attendance: 3 million per year
- Area: 136 acres (55 ha)
- Website: www.greenland.co.jp/park/

Greenland (グリーンランド, Gurīnrando) is an amusement park in Arao City, Kumamoto, Japan. It is among the largest amusement parks in on the island of Kyūshū. The total Greenland Resort has an area of 300 hectares in total, including the amusement park itself, a golf course, hotel, onsen, and shopping mall among other facilities. The park is run by Greenland Resort Co. Ltd., a part of the Saibu Gas Holdings Group.

The park was long known as Mitsui Greenland due to its association with the local Mitsui Miike Coal Mine. However, the park's name was shortened to simply "Greenland" on 21 July 2007 after the closure of the mine.

== Summary ==
With 81 rides, the park boasts the most attractions of any amusement park in Japan. The Ferris wheel "Rainbow" is one of the largest in Japan, at a height of 105m. The park contains 10 rollercoasters, including the suspension style "NIO", Kyūshū's longest rollercoaster "GAO", "Ultra Megaton", and "Milky Way" which features a sitting and standing ride which run in parallel. This was the most rollercoasters of any park in Japan until Greenland was overtaken in 2017 by Nagashima Spa Land. "Star Flyer," Kyūshū's first rotating swing style ride was developed in July 2012, costing 500 million yen (¥500,000,000). There are a number of trackless trains for travel around the park due to the hilly area on which it is built.

The park has operated 365 days a year since opening, with no breaks aside from those caused by extreme weather such as typhoons, and to prevent the spread of COVID-19. However, the park announced in August 2023 that it would operate with 22 days of closure per year from January 2024, to secure staff holidays and strengthen safety checks.

== Ownership ==
Greenland Resort Company Limited
- Native name: グリーンランドリゾート株式会社
- Type: Public company
- Traded as: TSE 9656 FSE 9656
- Genre: Tourism, Hotel, Sports
- Founded: 1980/01/10
- Headquarters: Arao City, Kumamoto, Japan
- Number of employees: 208 (2023)

The park's predecessor, Mitsui Miike Lake Development Co. Ltd. was founded in 1964 by the Mitsui Miike Coal Mine Group which operated in Ōmuta City, Fukuoka, which neighbours Arao. In July 1966, the project began with the development of a tourism-focused fruit farm (grapes and amanatsu), children's playground, boat lake and hotel. From this, tenants were gradually attracted who set up attractions. In 1976, the company merged into the Miike mine's Miike Coal Mine Construction Co., Ltd. The operation only went independent from the construction company in 1980 with the founding of Greenland Co., Ltd. In 1987 the company became a direct associate of the Mitsui Coal Mine and the company was renamed "Mitsui Greenland Co., Ltd." in 1990.

In 2005, Mitsui Mine sold its shares in the company to the Saibu Gas Group, making Saibu Gas the new largest shareholder. The Mitsui name was removed from the park on 1 July 2006, resulting in the current name.

=== Ownership history ===
- 1 October 1980 – Founded as Greenland Co., Ltd.
- Jun 1990 – Renamed to Mitsui Greenland Co., Ltd.
- Nov 1991 – Listed on the Fukuoka Stock Exchange.
- Dec 1992 – Listed on the Second Section of the Osaka Stock Exchange
- 1 September 2005 – Saibu Gas replaces Mitsui Coal Mine as largest shareholder
- 1 July 2006 – Renamed to Greenland Co., Ltd.
- Jul 2013 – Listed on the Second Section of the Tokyo Stock Exchange following the merger of the Tokyo and Osaka Stock Exchanges
- Apr 2022 – Moved from Tokyo Stock Exchange Second Section to the Standard Market following the restructuring of the listing system

=== Associated companies ===
- Greenland Development Co., Ltd. (Arao City, Kumamoto)
- Ariake Resort City Co., Ltd. (Arao City, Kumamoto)
- Sorachi Resort Co., Ltd. (Iwamizawa City, Hokkaido) – which runs the Hokkaido Greenland Amusement Park and Hokkaido Greenland Hotel Sun Plaza, formerly known as Iwamizawa Mitsui Greenland

== Access ==
=== Rail ===
- Ōmuta Station (JR Kagoshima Line/Nishitetsu Tenjin-Ōmuta Line) is a 20-minute Nishitetsu bus from the front gate of Greenland. This bus runs once an hour on weekdays and once or twice an hour on weekends and holidays.
- Arao Station (JR Kagoshima Line) is a 10-minute Sankō bus from the front gate/hotel gate.

=== Road ===
- 15 km from the Kyushu Expressway – Nankan interchange.

== Attractions ==
Roller coasters

- Dinocoaster "GAO"
  - Custom made by Meisho, track length 1735m, peak height 40m, top speed 100 km/h. Built in 1997 and renewed with a stegosaurus design.
- NIO
  - Manufactured by Vekoma. Track length 662m, peak height 35m, top speed 80 km/h, peak G-force 4.69G. It has ten 2-seater cars. It is a Suspended Looping Coaster (SLC). It is named after Nio, the two muscular guardians of the Buddha, with the course designed to resemble the Nio's garb. There is a statue of Agyo at the entrance, and a statue of Ungyo on the roof of the ride.
- Milky Way Vega/Altair
  - Made by Senyo Kogyo and TOGO. 650m track length, peak height 30, top speed 75 km/h, 6 cars fitting 4 riders. It was relocated from the EXPO '90 Osaka gardening exhibition where it was called "Fujin Raijin." The ride features two courses which run parallel, one sitting style and one stand-up style. After being renamed from Fujin Raijin to Milky Way in 2007, the sitting course was renamed Vega, and the standing course was renamed Altair, referencing the story celebrated during the Tanabata festival.
- Ladybird Coaster
- Granpus Jet
  - Manufactured by Vekoma and Sanoyas-Hishino-Meisho. 6 cars of 4 people, peak height 25m, top speed 60 km/h. The first suspended coaster in Kyūshū. The cars are designed to resemble grampuses and the tracks are painted blue to resemble the ocean. The platform is designed based on the Ryūgū-jō, the palace of the Dragon King in the story of Urashima Tarō.
- Black Hole Coaster
  - Track length 400m, top speed 30 km/h. An indoor black-hole themed coaster which features aurora and starry sky effects.
- Spin Mouse
  - Manufactured by Reverchon Industries. Track length 420m. A spinning wild mouse style coaster with 4-seater cars.
- Sphinx Coaster
  - Manufactured by Sky Park, track length 360m. Four 4-person cars, top speed 40 km/h. A small coaster with an ancient Egyptian Sphinx motif.
- Ultra Twister Megaton (Currently indefinitely suspended)
  - Manufactured by TOGO, track length 360m, peak height 30m, 6 cars with a capacity for 6 people each.

Haunted houses

- Horror Tower – Invitation to the Abandoned School
- Hell Temple Jigokudo
- Dororon Hospital
- 3D Sound Theatre Dracula

Ferris wheel

- Mega Ferris Wheel "Rainbow"
  - Diameter 100m, peak height 104.5m, 64 gondolas fitting 6 people each. Relocated from the Asia Pacific Expo '89 in Fukuoka.

Other thrill rides

- Splash
- Rapid Sliding Panic Jungle
- Super Viking
- Gyrostorm
- Dragon River
  - Manufactured by Vekoma. Track Length 329m, 10 carriages for 6 people each, 6 minutes to complete.
- Star Flyer Goku

Kids area

- Mini Viking
- Hammer Striker
- Everyone's Shinkansen
- Drive-a-saurus
- Machine Gun City

Other kids attractions

- Kururun Tower
- Operation Goodjob
- Mermaid Paradise
- Pteranodon
- Water Shot
- Submarine Shooting
- Flying Elephants
- Kids Station
- Service Car Drift Racing
- Dax – relocated from Kashii-Kaen
- Ball Shoot
- Ladybird – relocated from Kashii-Kaen
- Happy Sky (Kumamon Ver.) – Originally meant for Kashii-Kaen but moved to Greenland Kashii-Kaen's closure.

Other attractions

- Witch's Flying Tricks
- Merry-go-round Rendez-vouz
  - Made by Sanoyas Hishino Meisho, diameter of 20m, 40 horse seats, 8 carriage seats, for a total capacity of 80 riders
- Card Maze "Winding Forest Grand Adventure"
- Giant 3D Maze KARAKURI Castle
- Teacups
- Bang! Bang! Bazooka
- Cosmic Maze
- Trampoline
- Small Java
- Ice World
- Crystal House
- Luxor Magic Personality Test in the Valley of the Kings
  - Built by Nippo Sangyo. Walkthrough attraction based on the Luxor Temple. Slot a dagger and answer the question in each of the four rooms: "Gate room," "Illusion room," "Fresco room," and the "Defense room." In the final "Revelation Room" the results of the personality test are announced.
- Monsters x Heroes
- Sky Jet
- Monster Busters – Wild West Train
- 4D Gimmick Theatre

Park transport attractions

- Sky Lift (Observation Deck Direction – Pool Entrance Direction)
- Sky Ship (Dragon River Direction – Monster x Heroes Direction)
  - Boat shaped hanging monorail, 12 4-seater gondolas.
- Lift (Dinocoaster GAO Direction – Super Viking Direction)
- Road Train (Travels around the parks to 8 stops)

Carnival attractions

- Carnival Sultan (Hoop Throw)
- Shooting House（Target Shooting）
- Lazer Shooting
- G-ZONE (Skill Challenge Games)
- Carnival Games

Arcades

- Game Corner
- Game Plaza
- Joy Plaza

Go karts

- Indie Kart (1 Seater)
- Indie Kart (2 Seater)
- GT Go Kart (1 Seater)
- GT Go Kart (2 Seater)

Zoos

- Puppy Fun Animal Playground (with Piglets, Flamingo, Guinea pigs, Dogs among others)

== Notable former attractions ==
- Hurricane
  - Custom made by Meisho, track length 970m, peak height 30m, top speed 85 km/h. First domestically produced loop-de-loop coaster in Japan. It was replaced by the Dinocoaster in 1987.
- Atomic Coaster
  - Manufactured by Sengyo Kogyo, peak height 40m, track length 290m, Top speed 70 km/h, 6 cars holding 4 rides each。Round trip loop-de-loop style coaster. Its operation ceased in May 2009 but the loop part remains in the park.
- Adventure Boat
  - Built by Hitachi Zosen. 8 boats with a capacity of 12 people each. Diameter of 23m. A water ride with a boat in water which simulated ocean waves with a projected background.
- Hurricane Bolt
  - Made by the Dutch manufacturer Mondial. 6 pods seating 5 people each. Peak height 19.7m. The 6 pods rotated on an arm, attached to a main arm which moves up and down while rotating.
- Chaos
  - Made by American manufacturer Chance Rides. 18 2-person gondolas, peak height of 12m. Featured seats attached to a 19.95m disk which rotated while rising upwards.

== Amusement timeline ==
- 1979 – Hurricane
- 1980 – Atomic Coaster
- Summer 1983 – Crystal House
- Summer 1988 – Ice World
- 1987 – Dinocoaster (Later renamed Dinocoaster "GAO")
- 1990 – Mega Ferris Wheel Rainbow
- 1991 – Fujin Raijin (Later renamed Milky Way Vega/Altair)
- 1993 Sphinx Coaster, Adventure Boat
- 1994 – Ultra Twister Megaton
- 1995 – Grampus Jet, Luxor Magic
- Apr 1997 – NIO, Merry-go-round Rendez-vous
- Jul 1998 – Dragon River, Spin Mouse, Chaos, Hurricane, Sky Ship, Temple of the Demon Forest
- 2006 – Horror Tower – Invitation to the Abandoned School
- Apr 2006 – Witch's flying tricks
- 2007 – Black Hole Coaster, Hinata Kids
- 19 September 2009 – Gyrostorm
- 12 March 2011 – Water Shot
- Mar 2012 – Card Maze "Winding Forest Grand Adventure"
- 28 July 2012 – Star Flyer Goku
- Autumn 2014 – Giant 3D Maze KARAKURI Castle
- 21 July 2018 – Kururun Tower
- Mar 2019 – Monster Heroes, Monster Busters – Wild West Train, Lazer Shooting
- 2019 – Super Shooting Ride, Monster x Heroes
- Jul 2019 – Operation Goodjob
- May 2020 – Cosmic Maze
- Jul 2021 – Bang! Bang! Bazooka
- Apr 2022 – Dax, Ladybird, Happy Sky (Kumamon Ver.)
- Mar 2024 – Submarine Shooting

== Surrounding facilities ==
- Hotel Verde
- Hotel Blanca
- Greenland Resort Golf Course（Formerly: Mitsui Greenland Golf Course）
- Nurubon Garden Yakiniku
- Pascca World Bowling
- Kumamoto Kenmin Televisions Housing Exhibition
- Green Smile Retail Park

=== Previous surrounding facilities ===
- Tourist Fruit Farm – There from the parks beginning, it was made up of 17 hectares of vineyard and 20 hectares of amanatsu mandarin farm.
- Ultraman Land – Opened on part of the Greenland park grounds in 1996, and run independently by Tsuburaya Productions, it ran until 1 September 2013.
- Kyushu Puppy Paradise – Opened adjacent to the Greenland park grounds in March 2000, it closed on 30 June 2005. On 20 July of the same year, it was rebooted as the Puppy Fun Animal Playground attraction, a part of Greenland itself. The former site of Puppy Paradise now has retail shops such as a supermarket.
- Asia Park – Opened 21 July 1993. Even after introducong a Sega World arcade, Asia Park was unable to overcome financial difficulties and closed in August 2000 after accruing roughly 3.1 billion yen (¥3,100,000,000) in debt.

== In media ==
=== Television ===
- Playgirl Q（Episode 7, aired 1974） – Most of the second half takes place in the park.
- Seibu Keisatsu（Episode 64 & 65）- First episode to be filmed on location. Greenland used alongside The Miike Coal Mine Railway. The drama features a shootout between the police and criminals as well as the explosion of the free rest area.
- Super Rescue Solbrain（Episode 34 & 35, aired 1991）- A two part episode featuring a lengthy battle.
- Dwa!! Ultraman Land Spa-Arao Resort（12 Oct 1996 – 28 September 2002）- Recorded in Mitsui Greenland and Ultraman Land. Broadcast on RKB Mainichi Broadcasting, RKK Kumamoto Broadcasting, and RCC Broadcastingで放映。
- Ultraman Tiga（Episode 43, aired 1997）- Monsters appear in Greenland, breaking Rollercoasters and other attractions.
- USO!? Japan（Aired 2001）- Covered strange happenings in the Horror Tower attraction. The name was not shown on the broadcast.
- Kamen Rider 555（Episode 2, aired 2003）- The main characters set up a children's hairdresser in Greenland to recover their belt which was sold to a pawn shop. Greenland appears briefly in the filming outside the front gate.
- Ikkaku Senkin! Nihon Roulette（Aired 5 September 2008）- Appeared as part of quiz questions posed to participants.

=== Events ===
- A "Mitsui Greenland Battle! Gundam vs Borlean" event to commemorate the airing of Mobile Suit Victory Gundam. The featured show was entirely original aside from the Gundam suit used.

=== Novels ===
- Yoichi Komori "The World of Oz" (Published 2015 by Shueisha).

=== Film ===
- Oz Land – Teaching the Magic of Smiling。(2018) – Based on the novel "The World of Oz"。Filmed across all of Greenland, the park appears with its real name within the world of the film.

=== Music videos ===
- Greeeen "Midoriiro"（2019） – An original theme song made in collaboration with GReeeeN. A "GReeeeNLAND" collaboration ran in the park from 16 March to 26 May 2019.

== Accidents ==
- On 5 May 2007, "Fujin Raijin 2," a ride in Expoland in Suita City, Osaka derailed leading to the death of a passenger. Following this, many of the rides in Greenland containing the same parts as Fujin Raijin were temporarily closed. Aside from this, the Fujin Raijin 2 was shut down upon an inspection by its manufacturers Sengyo Kogyo. Because of this, the parts of Greenland's Fujin Raijin suspected of being prone to metal depreciation were replaced for new parts. After the replacement, the ride was renamed to Milky Way and reopened on 21 July 2007.
- On 2 January 2012, an accident occurred on the "Parachute Tower" ride when the gondolas failed to slow down adequately on their way down. A woman and her elementary school aged daughter suffered minor injuries in multiple areas. The incident was investigated by the MLIT due to potential for a more serious accident.。
- On 26 October, a passenger on the Sphinx Coaster suffered a broken left arm after colliding with a railing on the inspection catwalk near the final bend. The collision resulted from the rider reaching out to catch belongings that almost fell. To prevent similar incidents, the catwalk and railings were removed, and the ground was raised so inspections could instead be performed from underneath. Personal belongings were banned on the ride, and a shelf to leave belongings was installed. The frequency of warnings to keep hands and feet in the ride were also increased.
- In August 2019, a 5-year-old girl drowned in the wave pool.
