= Melbourne Star (disambiguation) =

The Melbourne Star is a giant ferris wheel in Melbourne, Australia, which closed in 2021.

Melbourne Star may also refer to:

- MV Melbourne Star (1936), a Blue Star Line refrigerated cargo liner launched in 1936 and sunk in 1943, or its 1947 or 1992 successors
- Melbourne Star, a defunct Australian newspaper
- Melbourne Stars, an Australian men's cricket team
- Melbourne Stars (WBBL), an Australian women's cricket team
