= Sanoyas Hishino Meisho =

Japanese company

Sanoyas Holdings Corporation
- Type: Public KK
- Traded as: TYO: 7022
- Industry: Shipbuilding, Engineering, Construction Machines Group, Leisure
- Founded: April 1911
- Headquarters: Kita-ku, Osaka, Japan
- Key people: Tatsuo Nagumo, Chairman, and Shinichi Kimura, President.
- Website: http://www.sanoyas.co.jp/

Sanoyas Hishino Meisho Corporation is a Japanese company that consists of four principal business groups and twelve affiliated companies. The business groups are: the Ship and Steel Structure Group, the Parking System & Engineering Group, the Construction Machines Group, and the Leisure Business Group.

The company's Ship and Steel Structure Group, builds and repairs ships, salvages sunken ships, leases and rents ships and shipboard machinery as well as providing actual marine transportation services. In support of these and other activities, the company also participates in the iron and steel processing sector.

The company's other three groups— the Parking System & Engineering Group, the Construction Machines Group, and the Leisure Business Group— have widely varied activities. Activities in these fields include manufacture, installation, sales, leasing and renting, repair and maintenance. Additional services in the civil engineering sector include design, supervision and contracting. The planning, design and installation of electrical signs and illumination systems is one of the company's specialties.

The company also has some pure management revenue streams: amusement park management, real estate management, rental, sale and mediation, and additional related activities.

== History ==
Sanoyas Hishino Meisho affiliated companies
Name	Established	Capital mln. yen	Business lines
Yamada Industries Ltd.	October 17, 1925	¥M200	Environmental controls
Yamada Engineering Service Co., Ltd.	March 5, 1981	¥M10	Engineering services
K.S SANOYAS Co., Ltd.	December 29, 1940	¥M180	Mechanical parts
SANOYAS SANGYO Co., Ltd.	April 11, 1979	¥M60	Services
SANOTEC Corporation	October 31, 1984	¥M80	Computer and software
SANOYAS SHOJI Co., Ltd.	August 30, 1956	¥M48	Shipping and shipbuilding
SANOYAS TATEMONO Co., Ltd.	June 29, 1972	¥M200	Services
Sanoyas Security Patrols Co., Ltd.	November 25, 1983	¥M20	Security
Sanoyas Engineering Co., Ltd.	April 1, 1986	¥M30	Engineering
Katoh Precise Machinery Co., Ltd.	November, 1961	¥M64	Robotics and machinery
Mizuho Industrial Co., Ltd.	May 7, 1960	¥M60	Processing equipment
Meisho Network Co., Ltd.	July 1, 1989	¥M80	Leisure industry

The company was founded in April 1911 as the Sanoyas Shipyard. In June 1940, it was incorporated as Sanoyas Dockyard Co. with ¥1.5 million of capital. In 1967, it was listed on the Osaka Stock Exchange. In 1984, the company changed its name to Sanoyas Corporation. After a 1991 merger with Meisho Co., Ltd. the name was changed once again to Sanoyas Hishino Meisho Corporation. As of March 2007, the company had a capital base of ¥2.538 billion.

== Shipbuilding and repair ==
The company's shipbuilding efforts are headquartered at its Mizushima Works and Shipyard. Here, the company builds bulk carriers and tankers.

The company specializes in the Panamax-size bulkers, having built about 60 ships of this size. The company has been able to build bulkers with capacity of up to 83,000 tonnes deadweight (DWT) able to pass through the Panama Canal. Other bulker designs by the company include Handymax-size general bulkers and 52,000 DWT woodchip carriers.

The company also makes a 115,527 DWT Aframax-size tanker.

As a spinoff of its shipbuilding business, Sanoyas Hishino Meisho entered the ship repair and refitting business. This company works on cargo ships, high-speed ships, ferries, tankers, car carriers, floating cranes, dredgers, and all types of work barges.

The company's Mizushima Works and Shipyard is the company's flagship facility and is located in Kurashiki City in the Okayama Prefecture. The facility employs advanced shipbuilding techniques using computerized and robotic systems for ship building, repair, conversion, and renovation work. The facility has a shipyard, four wharfs, a dry dock capable of holding up to three ships at once, and 46 cranes with capacity up to 800 metric tons.

The company's Osaka Works provides many services for the Ship and Steel Structure group and other groups in the company. The facility has a shipyard, a wharf, and several factories. Some of the resources there include two dry docks and thirteen cranes with capacity up to 80 metric tons. The Osaka Ship Repairing Factory has a shop devoted to maintaining the hull and machinery for high-speed ships.

== See also ==
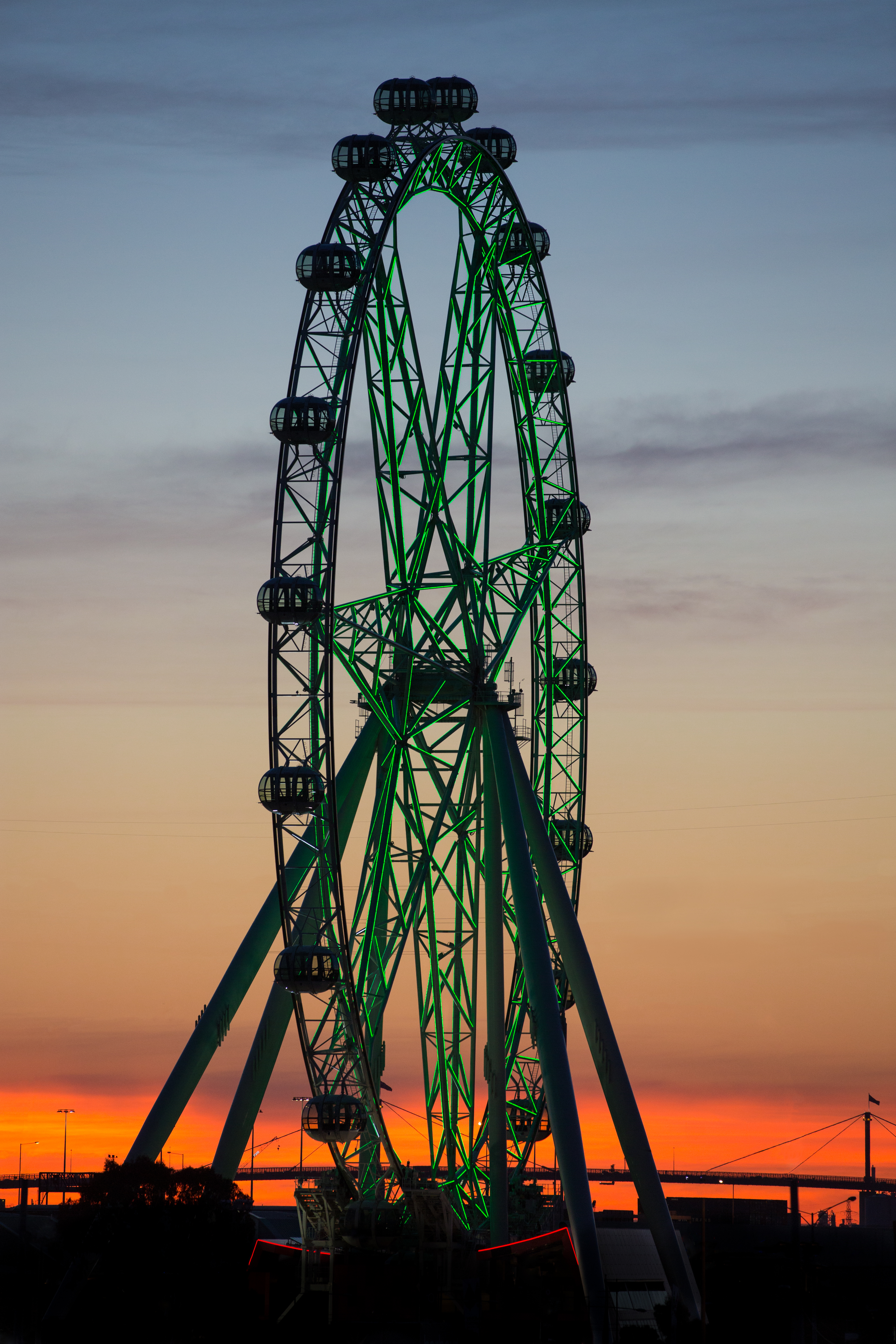
Melbourne Star, one of more than 80 Ferris wheels built by Sanoyas

- Melbourne Star
