= Melbourne Star =

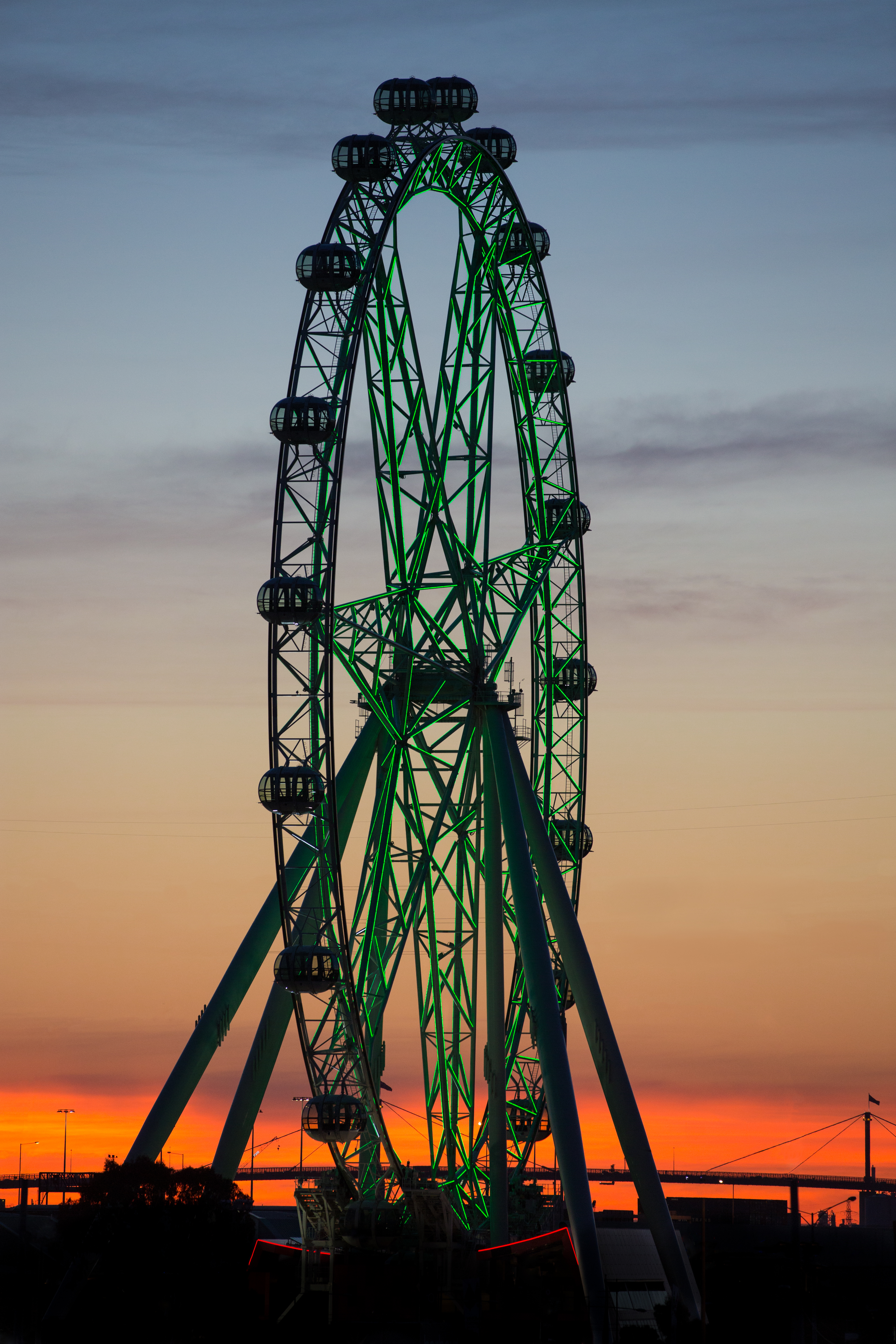
- Melbourne Star in December 2013
- Former names: Southern Star

General information
- Status: Operating
- Type: Observation wheel
- Location: Melbourne Docklands, Australia
- Coordinates: 37.81186°S 144.93760°E
- Construction started: 30 June 2006
- Opened: Original wheel: 20 December 2008; Replacement wheel: 23 December 2013
- Cost: A$100 million (estimate)
- Owner: Sanoyas Rides Australia (2006-2021); RoBu Group (2021 – present)

Height
- Height: 140 m (459 ft)

Dimensions
- Diameter: 110 m (361 ft)

Design and construction
- Architect: Sanoyas
- Main contractor: Hansen Yuncken

The Melbourne Star (previously Southern Star) is a 120-metre-tall (390 ft) Ferris wheel in the suburb of Docklands in Melbourne, the state capital of Victoria, Australia.

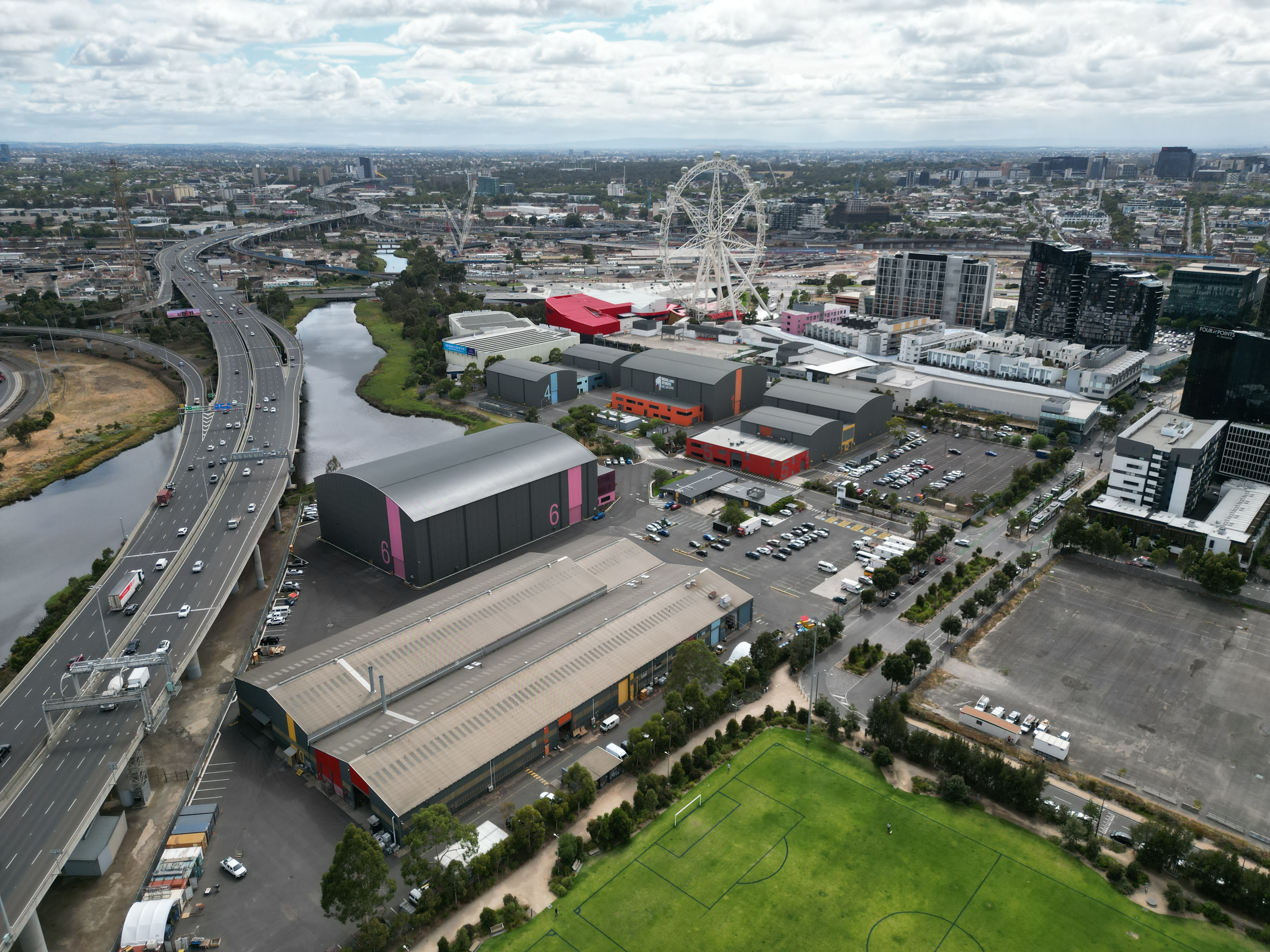
Aerial perspective of the Docklands: Melbourne Flyer, the District and Docklands film studio

Described by its operators as an "observation wheel" and claimed to be "the Southern Hemisphere's only giant observation wheel", it is 120 m (394 ft) tall and has seven spokes, reflecting the seven-pointed star of the Australian flag.

It opened two years behind schedule in December 2008, but closed 40 days later due to structural defects. The wheel itself was scrapped and replaced, but the original support structure and passenger cabins were retained. It was originally thought that reconstruction might be completed in late 2010, but repeated delays meant it did not reopen until 23 December 2013.

A ride (one complete rotation) takes 30 minutes and, according to the Star's website, provides uninterrupted 360-degree views of up to 40 kilometres (25 mi) "encompassing the Docklands precinct, Melbourne’s CBD, Port Phillip Bay and as far as Mount Macedon, Arthurs Seat and the Dandenong Ranges."

The wheel closed on 6 September 2021, due to the COVID-19 pandemic. It reopened on 15 October 2026.

== Southern Star ==
=== Construction ===
The project was undertaken by ING Real Estate, and the construction consultant was Hansen Yuncken. The wheel was designed and built by Sanoyas Rides Corporation, a wholly owned subsidiary of the Japanese ship and amusement park ride builder Sanoyas Holdings Corporation. The steel builder was Alfasi Steel Constructions.

Construction began in 2006. By 1 March 2008, the outer rim had been completed; by 21 October, air-conditioned enclosed passenger cabins, built in Osaka, Japan, were receiving their fit-out. Each cabin weighs 13 tonnes, is 5.7 m (19 ft) long and 3.7 m (12 ft) high, has floor to ceiling glass walls, and can accommodate up to 20 passengers.

=== Opening ===
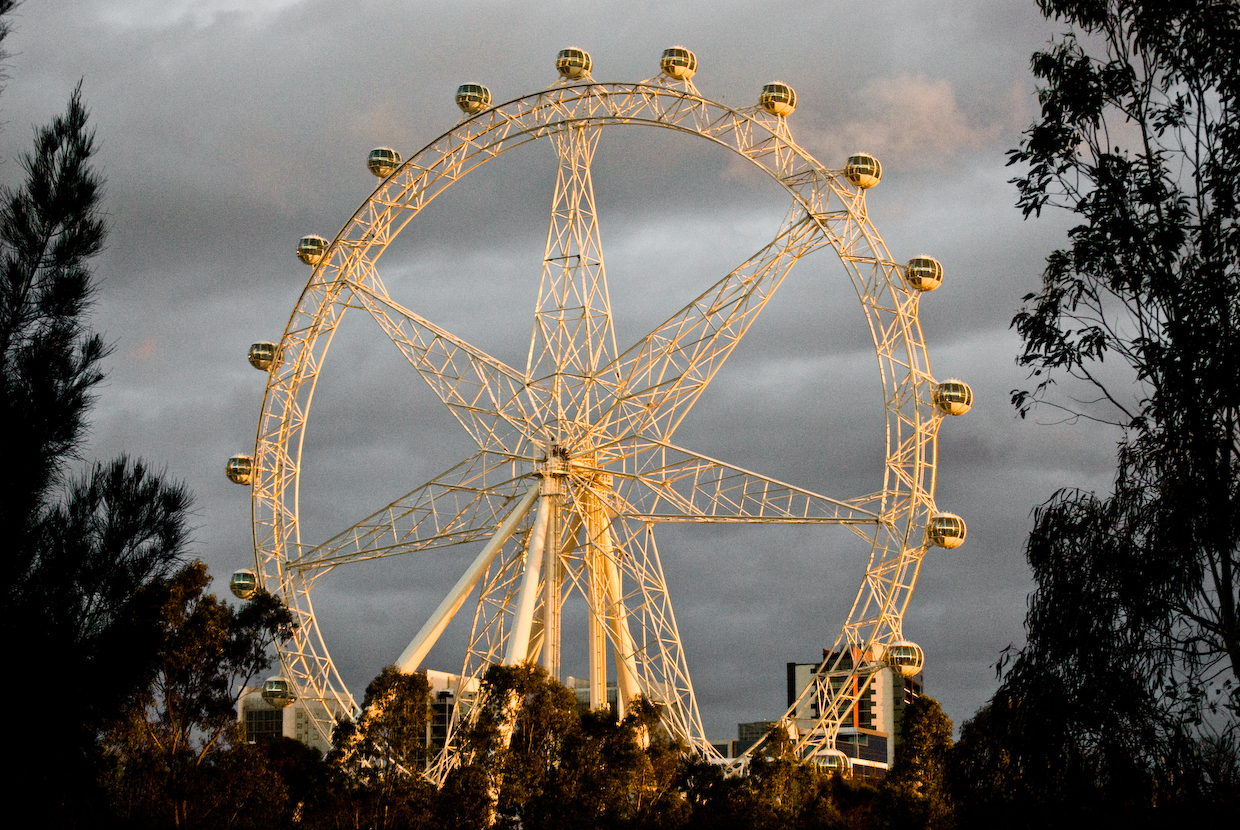
Southern Star prior to its 2009 closure

The wheel first opened to the public on 20 December 2008, two years behind schedule. Its ceremony, scheduled for 28 November 2008, was cancelled due to bad weather and delays in procuring parts. It had cost an estimated A$100 million to construct and was expected to attract more than one million visitors annually. At opening, tickets cost $29 for adults and $17 for children; as of 2018, tickets cost $39 for adults and $27 for children.

=== First closure ===
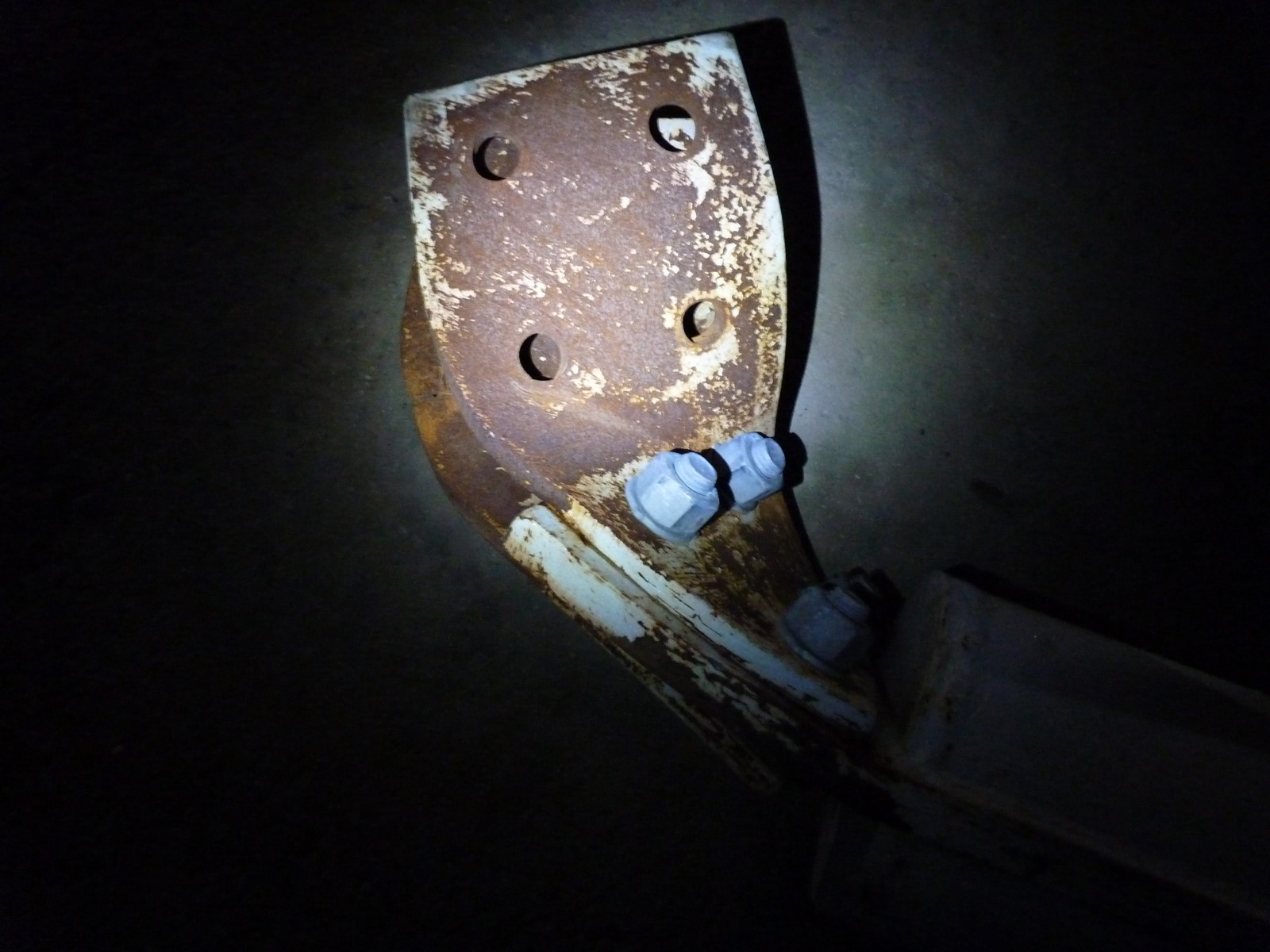
Failed joint from the 2009 wheel

On 30 January 2009, 40 days after opening, the wheel was shut down by WorkSafe after cracks up to three metres (9.8 ft) long were discovered by a contract worker installing LED lighting. One node was almost completely torn from its welded joint. Initially, the operators blamed the 2009 Southeastern Australia heat wave for causing the damage, and it was not known when the wheel would reopen.

Upon further investigation, engineers working on the wheel discovered the cracks were not caused by the heatwave but rather a problem in the original design. Fourteen cracks were found in the steel.

An undated press release on the operator's official website stated: "The Southern Star Observation Wheel was temporarily closed in January 2009. As a result of extensive design and technical reviews a conclusion was reached to build a new wheel."

Sanoyas, who designed and built the wheel, accepted responsibility for the cracks and undertook its reconstruction under warranty. Consulting engineers Arup, steel builder Alfasi, and construction consultant Hansen Yuncken signed confidentiality agreements preventing them from commenting publicly. Most of the original wheel was sold for scrap, but the main support columns and the passenger cabins were retained and reused.

=== Reconstruction ===
The reconstruction process began in a factory in Dandenong South in December 2009, at which time it was expected that a year would pass before the wheel would reopen.

In October 2010 it was reported that the viability of the wheel was in doubt after contractors stopped work because they had not been paid, although a spokeswoman for Southern Star Management Group denied this, stating that "the construction process is extremely intricate and highly influenced by adverse weather conditions, including rain, wind, [and] hot and cold weather".

In January 2011, the first of the seven replacement spokes, manufactured by BMC (Note: BMC Welding and Construction, a division of BMC Holdings (VIC) Pty Ltd, is a Victorian engineering and maintenance company, based in Morwell, Victoria. It was acquired by the Monadelphous Group Ltd in 2023.) in the Latrobe Valley, was delivered to Docklands. In July 2011, the wheel was expected to be turning again by the end of the year.

On 28 November 2011, reconstruction work was in progress when the wheel broke free from its restraints and began turning in strong winds, resulting in minor injuries for one of the workers as they fled the site. The next day, Southern Star Management issued a statement saying that bracing used to erect the wheel had failed, and that no final completion date for the wheel had yet been confirmed. In December it was reported that the wheel was not expected to reopen before Easter 2012.

In January 2012, it was reported that an international team of experts including Arup (who were involved in both the London Eye and the Singapore Flyer projects) and Hyder Consulting had been engaged in the redesign, and that reconstruction was now expected to be completed before the end of the year. In June it was reported that the then owner ING Real Estate had repeatedly refused to announce an estimated completion date, but that an estimated date might be given at a briefing of state government officials planned for July.

In August, it was reported that the wheel could reopen in January 2013, but only if there was "no wind, no rain for the next four months" – an unlikely scenario for Melbourne, "a city renowned for extremely windy springs and rain that washes out the first cricket matches". According to spokesman Ken Davis, 70 per cent of available construction time was being lost each week as cranes and lifts on the site could not operate in bad weather. He also stated that "due to the complexity of the construction process, we are not in a position to make any announcements regarding a 2013 opening date". However, later that same month, after the final section of the rim was installed, he stated "we're hoping it will be completed by the middle of next year".

In January 2013, ING Real Estate advised that the wheel would not reopen until the second half of the year.

== Melbourne Star ==
=== Reconstruction continues ===
On 27 April 2013, the wheel was rebranded as the Melbourne Star. On 25 August, the opening was put back yet again, to March 2014. Three days later the first of the original cabins, which had been in storage since the original wheel was dismantled, was reinstalled. This took up to three-quarters of a day each, depending on weather conditions. The only substantial modification was an upgrade of their audio systems.

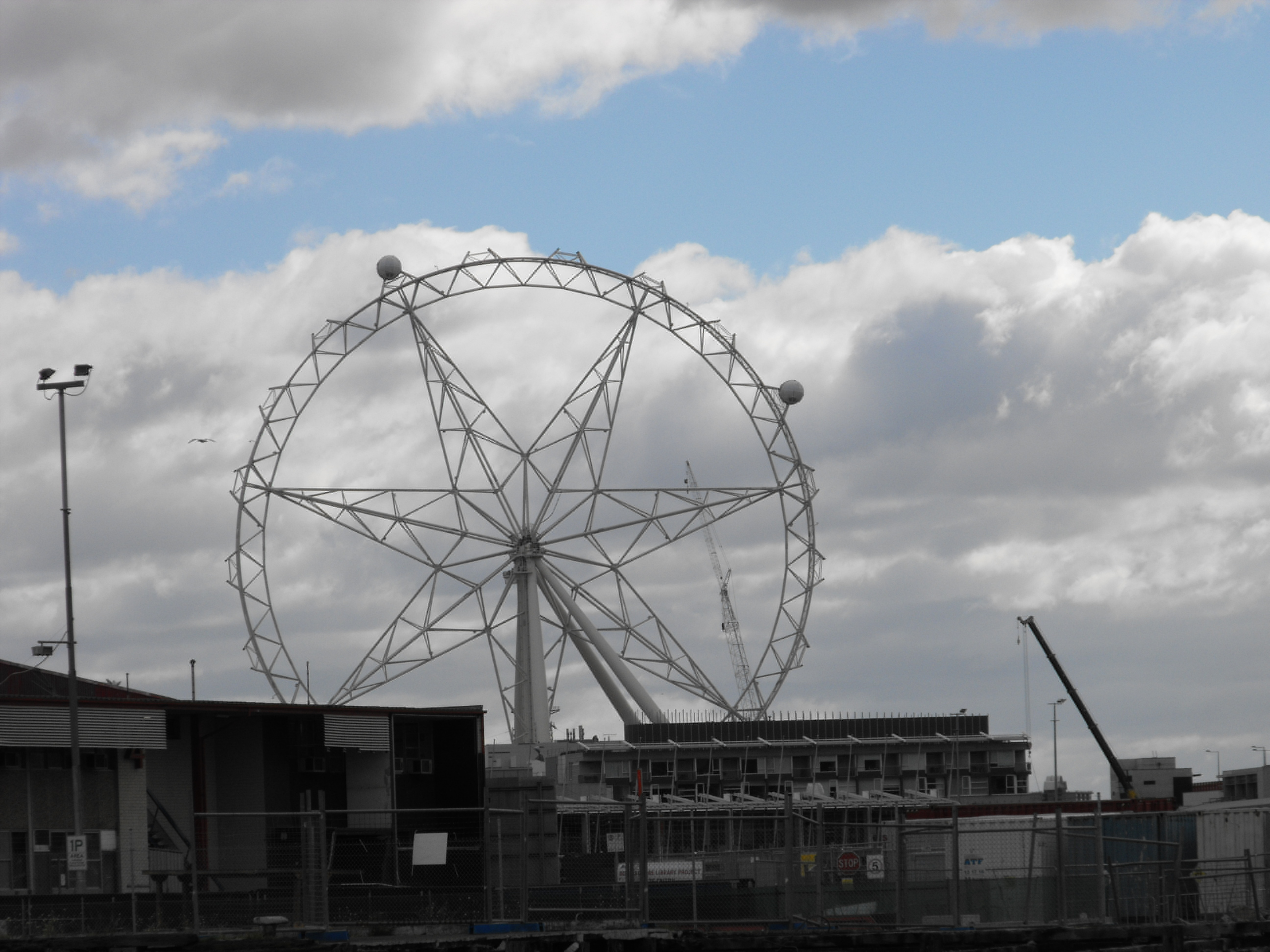
The first cars being reattached during the restoration in August 2013

On 11 October 2013, it was announced that Sanoyas had purchased the wheel from ING Real Estate for an undisclosed price, and that Melbourne Star Management Group would continue to manage it. On 25 October, Sanoyas Holdings Corporation president Takashi Ueda announced that the company was aiming to reopen the attraction in ten weeks time. Advertisements for approximately 100 jobs began appearing on the Melbourne Star website and on the Seek recruiting website.

=== 2013 reopening ===
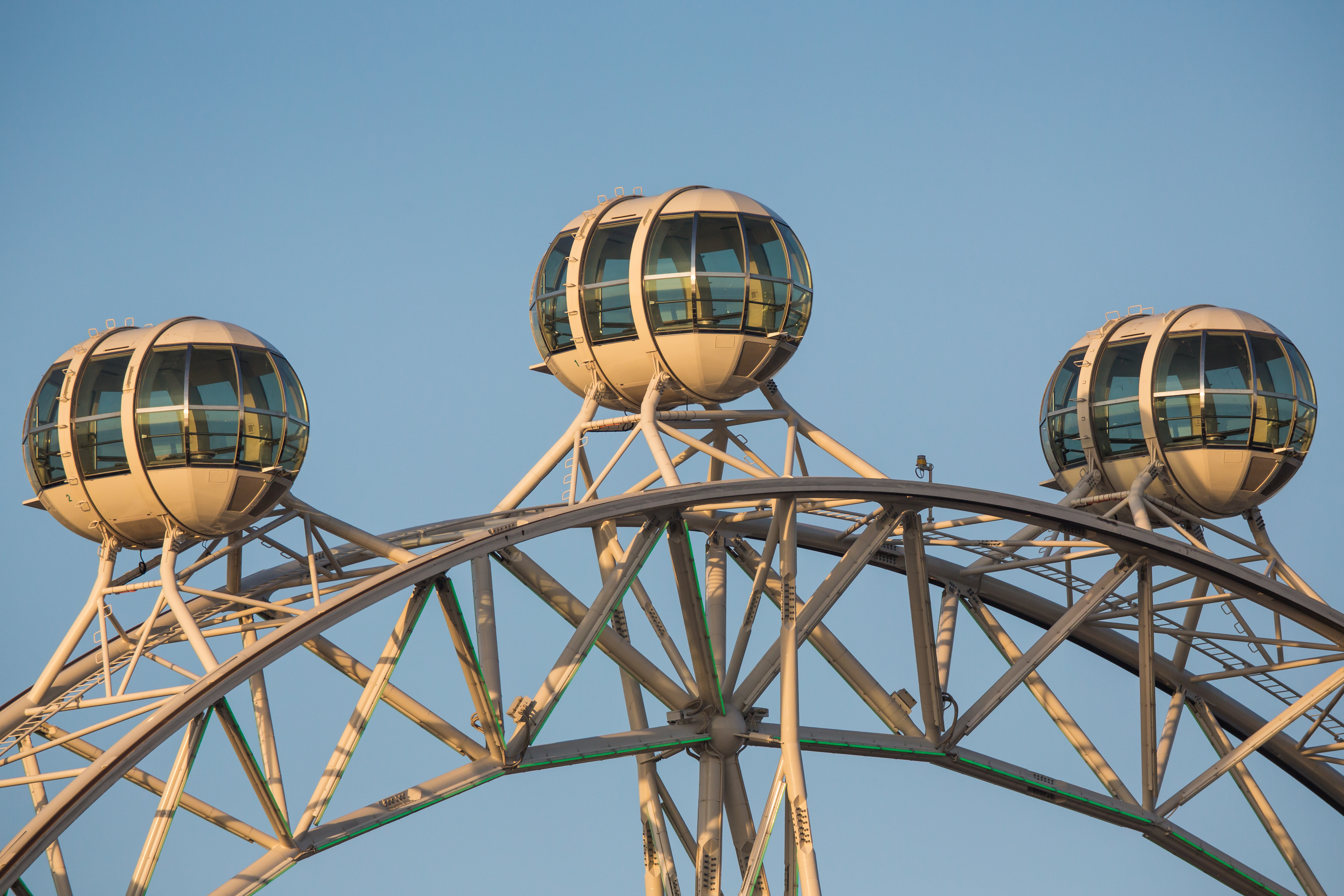
Original passenger cabins fitted to the new wheel

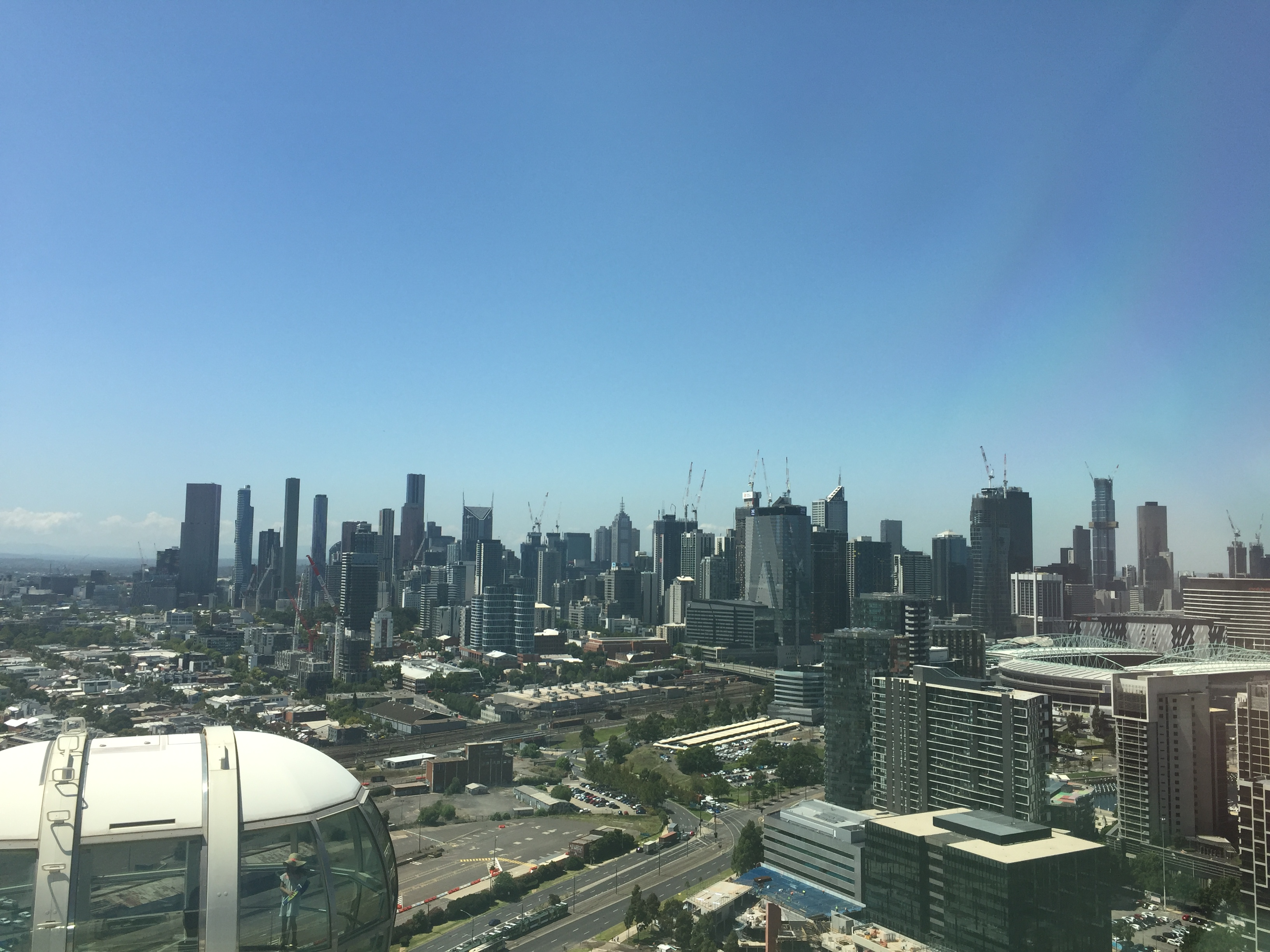
View of Melbourne central business district from the top of the Melbourne Star

On 6 December 2013, it was reported that construction work had been completed, and an announcement on the Star's website stated that the reopening would be in late December. Melbourne Star Management Group CEO Chris Kelly was quoted as saying "We are working to the earliest possible opening date. We are now well into the commissioning process, which is the final stage before opening, but some activities do remain weather dependent."

On 15 December, a promotional television advertising campaign commenced, and three days later it was announced that the wheel would open for guests on 23 December 2013 – almost five years after the original wheel was shut down in January 2009.

On the evening of 26 December, three days after the reopening, the wheel was stopped for several minutes while a cabin was inspected and taken out of service after passenger Marco Bresciani discovered a cracked window. CEO Chris Kelly described the damage as a "very minor cosmetic issue" caused by a bird strike. "The glass has been inspected and our advice is that it is cosmetic and doesn't present any safety issues. It is in the process of being repaired."

On the afternoon of 28 December, the wheel was evacuated to allow a "full inspection" after the wheel unexpectedly stopped rotating. It was restarted 15 minutes later. Spokeswoman Sally Abbott said technicians had identified an "isolated incident" but refused to provide any details.

The Victorian Workcover Authority subsequently investigated safety complaints by several visitors. Two families were reported to have been traumatised and left "shaking and in tears" after cabin eight became stuck and began tilting as the wheel turned. The operators confirmed that an alarm was triggered on both occasions but refused to say what triggered it, whether the two incidents were connected, if the same cabin was involved, if cabin eight remained in service, or whether it had been serviced between the two incidents. CEO Chris Kelly said the wheel remained open and safe for tourists even though one of the cabins had been taken out of service, and insisted that the cabin "did not tilt or rock at any stage". He refused to answer questions about the mechanics of the wheel or the cabins, or to confirm that the same cabin was involved in both incidents, saying: "It is not our policy to comment on the specifics due to the highly complex engineering and electrical systems that operate the Star" and "It is not our policy to divulge this information as we don't want people to needlessly avoid specific cabins in the future."

On 24 January 2014 the Star was again unexpectedly closed. Visitors arriving at the wheel were told the closure was due to "windy conditions"; however, a spokeswoman said "operations have been temporarily suspended due to a software problem. Our technical services team are undertaking a comprehensive investigation to identify and correct the issue and we are expecting to resume operations later today." The wheel was closed from 11:00 until the following morning.

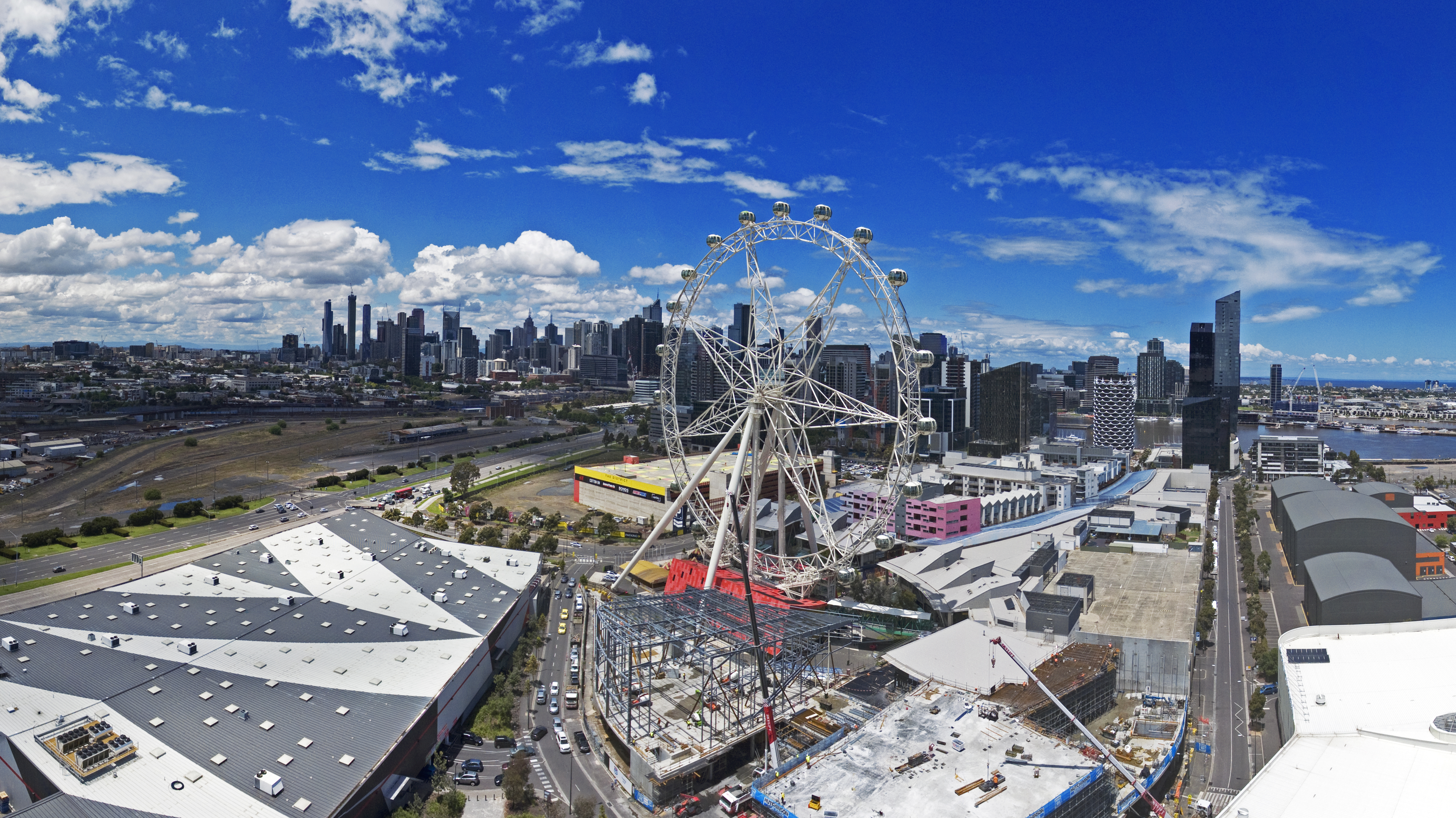
Melbourne Star, 2017

=== 2021 closure ===
On 6 September 2021, the MB Star Properties announced that due to the COVID-19 pandemic, travel restrictions and high-rise development in the surrounding area, the wheel was closed permanently. The wheel was purchased by RoBu Group in 2021.

=== 2026 reopening ===
Despite being previously announced as permanently closed, plans were announced in August 2025 that the wheel would reopen in 2026. Its lights were re-lit at 18:45 on 30 July 2026, The Melbourne Star reopened on 15 October 2026.
