= Saibu Gas =

Saibu Gas Co., Ltd. 西部瓦斯株式会社
- Trade name: 西部ガス
- Native name: 西部瓦斯株式会社
- Romanized name: Saibu Gasu Kabushiki-gaisha
- Type: Public (K.K.)
- Traded as: TYO: 9536
- Industry: Energy
- Founded: December 1, 1930
- Headquarters: Hakata-ku, Fukuoka, Japan
- Area served: Fukuoka, Saga, Nagasaki, Kumamoto
- Services: Production, supply and sale of city gas Supply and sale of gas appliances, and related construction Construction for supply of city gas Energy services Supply of electricity
- Revenue: ▲¥203,478 million (FY 2019)
- Operating income: ▼¥10,095 million (FY2019)
- Net income: ▼¥4,369 million (FY2019)
- Total assets: ▲¥370,423 million (FY2019)
- Number of employees: ▲1,342 (2019)
- Website: www.saibugas.co.jp/e/

Saibu Gas Co., Ltd. (西部瓦斯株式会社, Saibu Gasu Kabushiki-gaisha), commonly written as 西部ガス, is a Japanese gas company based in Fukuoka, Japan. It supplies gas to the Northern Kyushu region, including in the area of Fukuoka, Saga, Nagasaki, and Kumamoto.

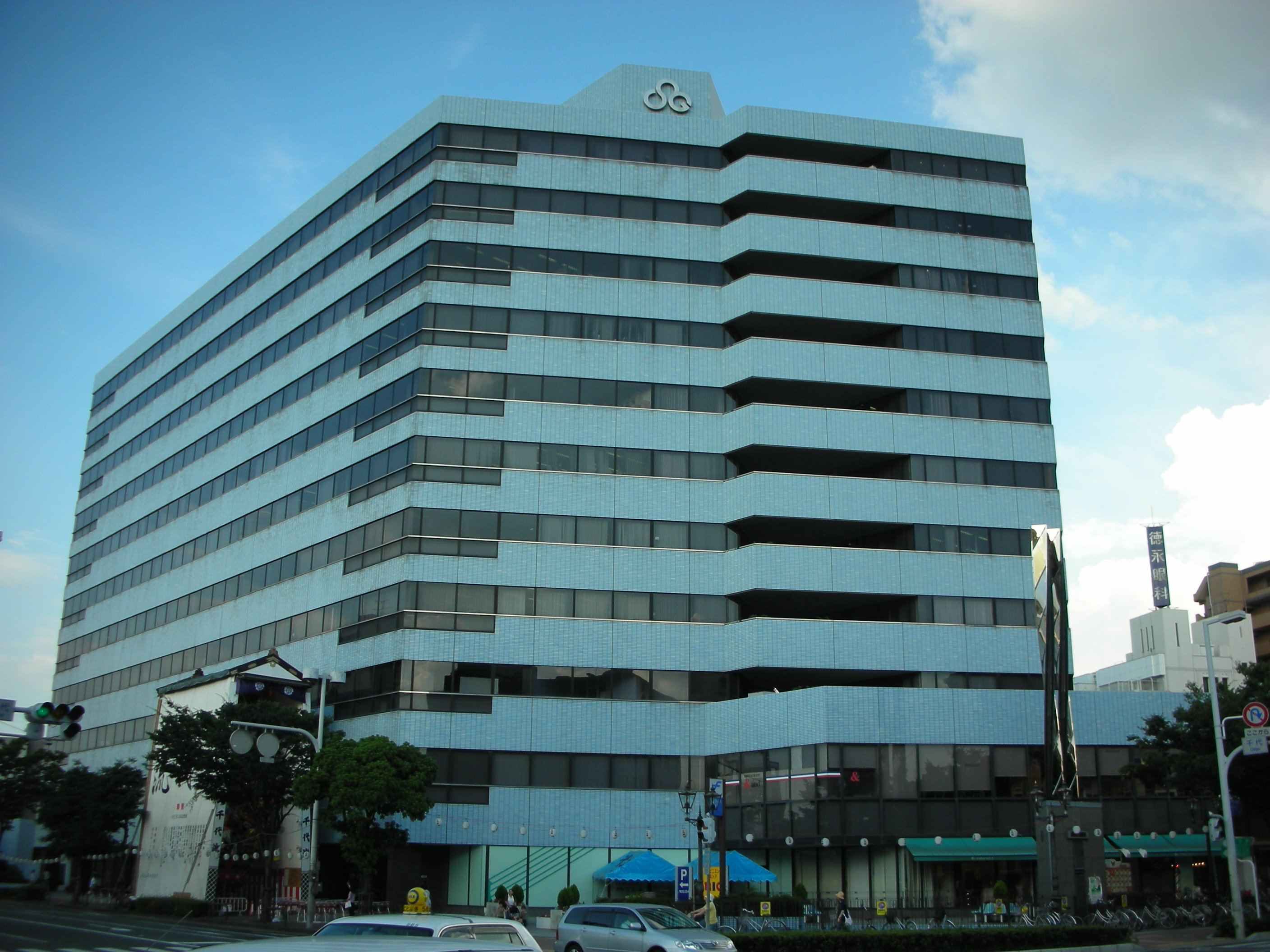
Saibu Gas head office

== Timeline ==
In 1902, Nagasaki Gas was founded as Kyushu's first gas company. In 1913, Nagasaki Gas merged with 3 other gas companies in the Northern Kyushu region to create the Saibu Gas Conglomerate. On December 1, 1930, Saibu Gas was founded by acquiring business of Toho Gas Kyushu Branch operations in Fukuoka, Kumamoto, Nagasaki, and Sasebo. Headquarters located in Chiyo, Hakata-ku, Fukuoka. In 1943, Saibu Gas merged with Kyushu Gas. The headquarters moved to Kego, Chūō-ku, Fukuoka in 1954 and to Chiyo in 1988. In 2009, Saibu Gas acquired business of Kurume City Gas Bureau. The company established a representative office in Singapore in 2018.
