= Ulmus glabra 'Macrophylla' =

Elm cultivar

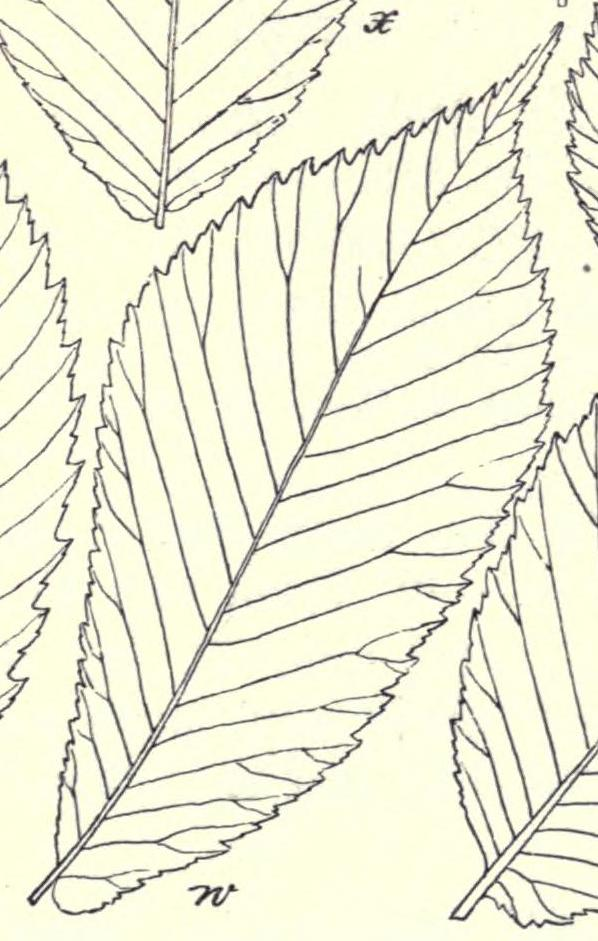
- Leaf-drawing ("w") of U. montana f. macrophylla (Schneider)
- Species: Ulmus glabra
- Cultivar: 'Macrophylla'
- Origin: France

The putative Wych Elm cultivar Ulmus glabra 'Macrophylla' [literally 'long-leaved', though also 'large-leaved'] was first mentioned by Lavallée in 1877 as U. montana var. macrophylla (fastigiata). The Späth nursery of Berlin marketed an U. montana macrophylla in the late 19th and early 20th century; both Späth and the Hesse Nursery of Weener, Germany, supplied it in the 1930s. At that time, Ulmus montana was used both for wych elm cultivars and for hybrid cultivars of the Ulmus × hollandica group.

Augustine Henry thought the tree sold as U. montana var. macrophylla identical with those he saw at Looymans' nursery at Oudenbosch, which in turn he considered indistinguishable from the cultivar 'Pitteurs' growing in the town of St. Trond (Flemish: Sint-Truiden) in Belgium before the First World War.

Henry also noted that a tree grown at Kew labelled U. montana macrophylla fastigiata was similar in all respects to 'Superba'. Elsewhere, he judged Kew's U. montana macrophylla fastigiata "not distinct enough to deserve a special name"; but this was a "small tree", and may not yet have produced distinctive mature-canopy leaves.

See also the similarly named Ulmus montana forma fastigiata macrophylla.

== Description ==
'Macrophylla' was described as having the largest leaves, and being of very strong growth.

== Cultivation ==
U. montana macrophylla was introduced to the Dominion Arboretum, Ottawa, Canada, probably from Späth, in 1899.

== Accessions ==
Europe

- Grange Farm Arboretum, Lincolnshire, UK. Acc. no. 1127.
