= Ulmus × hollandica 'Pitteurs' =

Elm cultivar

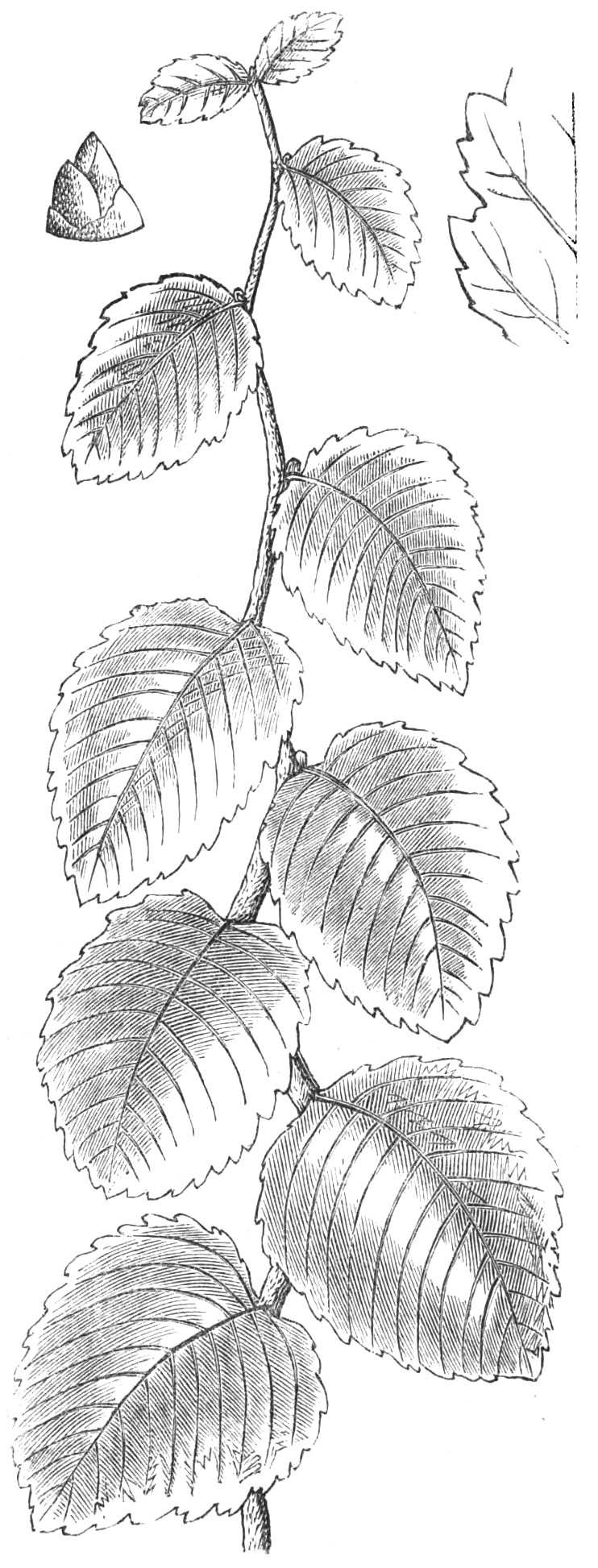
- Leaves of 'Pitteurs'
- Hybrid parentage: U. glabra × U. minor
- Cultivar: 'Pitteurs'
- Origin: Belgium

Ulmus × hollandica 'Pitteurs' or 'Pitteursii', one of a number of hybrid cultivars arising from the crossing of the Wych Elm Ulmus glabra with a variety of Field Elm Ulmus minor, was first identified by Morren as l'orme Pitteurs (1848). Elwes and Henry (1913) and Krüssmann (1976) listed it as an Ulmus × hollandica cultivar. It was named after the landowner Henri Bonaventure Trudon de Pitteurs of Saint-Trond, near Liège, Belgium, who discovered and first propagated the tree on his estate.

== Description ==
'Pitteurs' was a tall tree, chiefly distinguished by its large, rounded, convex leaves, < 20 cm long by < 19 cm broad, a little attenuate at the apex and with prominent venation. Kirchner and Petzold, describing a tree by that name from the Royal State Tree Nursery at Sanssouci, noted (1864) that the slightly glossy dark green leaves were obtuse-toothed, and appeared reddish-brown when they unfolded. Aigret, however, reported (1905) that the specimen in the Jardin Botanique de Liège, planted in Morren's time, did not match Morren's description, having leaves of ordinary U. montana [used both for wych and for Ulmus × hollandica] dimensions, and being more elongated and acuminate than those described. This suggests that Morren's measurements for 'Pitteurs', like his measurements for 'Superba', may have been based on the largest of long-shoot leaves.

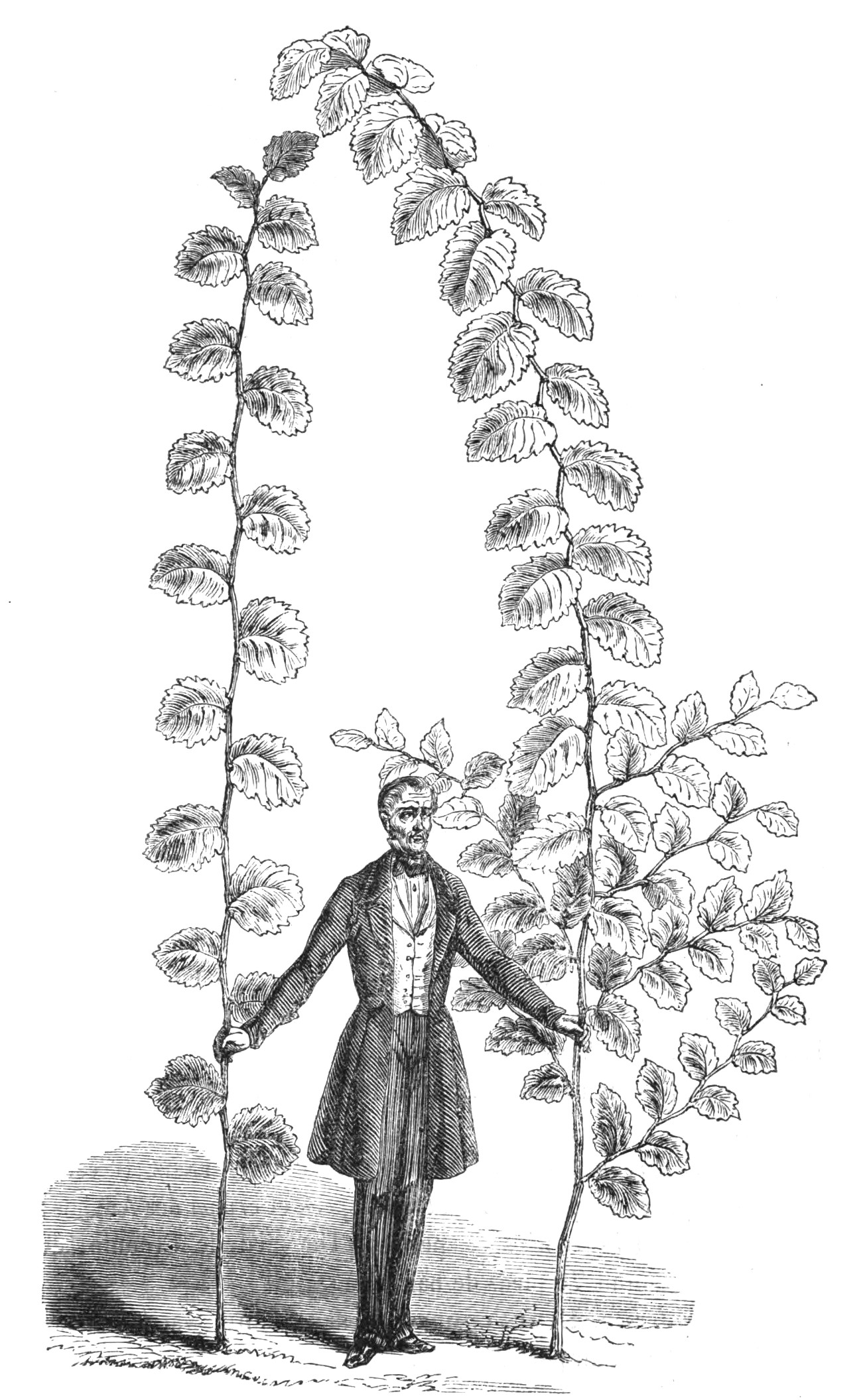
Long shoots of 'Pitteurs': a playful drawing from Morren, also picturing H. B. T de Pitteurs (?), who on the scale of 20-cm leaves would be little over 1 m tall

== Cultivation ==
Reputedly one of two varieties grown from seed obtained in 1845 by Henri de Pitteurs of Sint-Truiden or Saint-Trond, near Liège, Belgium, the tree was planted on his estate and along roadsides in the region. (The second variety may have been the Ulmus hollandica belgica St.Trons in The Hague, listed separately from 'Belgica' and 'Pitteurs' by Christine Buisman in 1933.) Gillekens noted in 1891 that in the areas of Liège and Limbourg, 'Pitteurs' was preferred to 'Belgica'. Augustine Henry (1912) thought the tree, which produced shoots growing almost one metre a year, probably identical with those called orme Saint-Trond he saw at Looymans' nursery at Oudenbosch, which he considered perhaps identical when young to a variety of Ulmus montana occasionally sold as var. macrophylla. An elm said to be similar and also cultivated on the Pitteurs estate was 'Folia Rhomboidea'.

'Pitteurs' was distributed as Ulmus campestris Pittersii by the Baudriller nursery, Angers. The Späth nursery of Berlin sold an elm which they said went by the name of 'Pitteurs' in some nurseries but which they themselves called U. hollandica. They continued to distribute it till the late 1930s. A specimen stood in Cantons Park, Baarn, in the interwar period. The Hesse nursery of Weener, Germany, marketed 'Pitteurs' in the 1930s as Ulmus latifolia, adding " = U. hollandica or U. pitteursi ", and in the 1950s as U. hollandica pitteursi.

By 1900 there was a regular annual supply from the Netherlands (initially mainly from Oudenbosch, later from Opheusden) of several thousand 'Pitteurs' and 'Vegeta' to the Duchy of Schleswig and to Schleswig-Holstein, for coastal planting. After 1920 the numbers decreased as more elms began to be cultivated locally. With the spread, however, of the first Dutch elm disease epidemic, elm planting ceased in the area around 1930, and tens of thousands of unsellable 'Pitteurs' in nurseries had to be destroyed. They were often dug up for free by the unemployed, for use as firewood.

The Ulmus gras introduced to the USA c.1871, "a fine pyramidal-growing variety", distinguished in catalogues from 'Belgica', may have been Orme gras ('Pitteurs'). It was later renamed Ulmus montana grassei by some nurseries. 'Pitteurs' was present in the Arnold Arboretum, Massachusetts, in the interwar years.

In 1998 an unsuccessful search of the de Pitteurs-Hiegaerts Estate (now in the public domain and known as the Speelhof park) was mounted in an attempt to rediscover the elm. It is assumed the cultivar fell victim to Dutch elm disease, as did thousands of other elms in the same district. However, 'Pitteurs' was known to have been marketed (as U. montana 'Pitteursi') in Poland in the 19th century by the Ulrich nursery, Warsaw, and so may still survive in Eastern Europe. Several trees were thought to survive in England, in the Brighton area. 'Pitteurs' is not known to have been introduced to North America or Australasia.

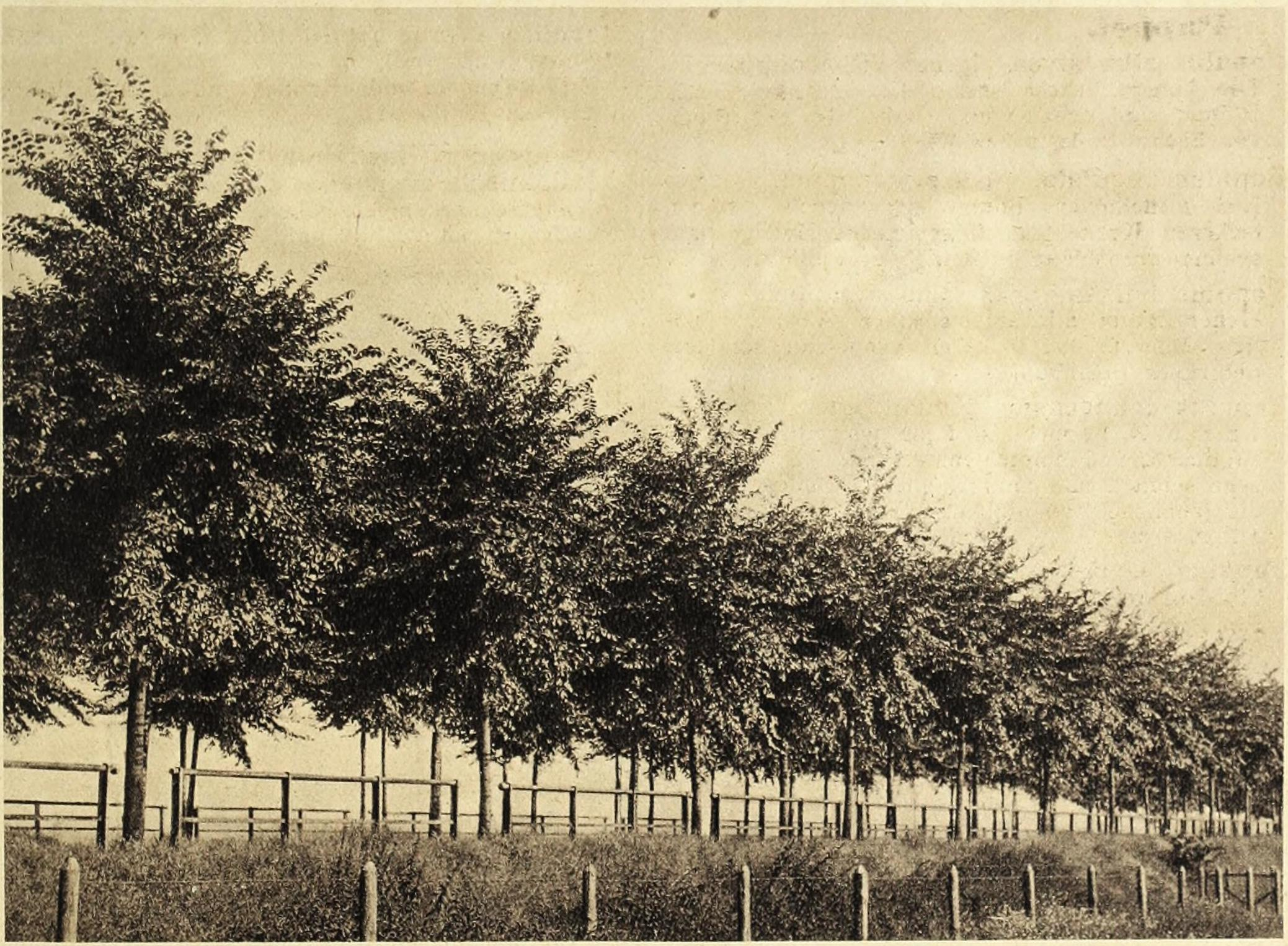
Späth's U. hollandica, "known as 'Pitteurs' in some nurseries" (1920).

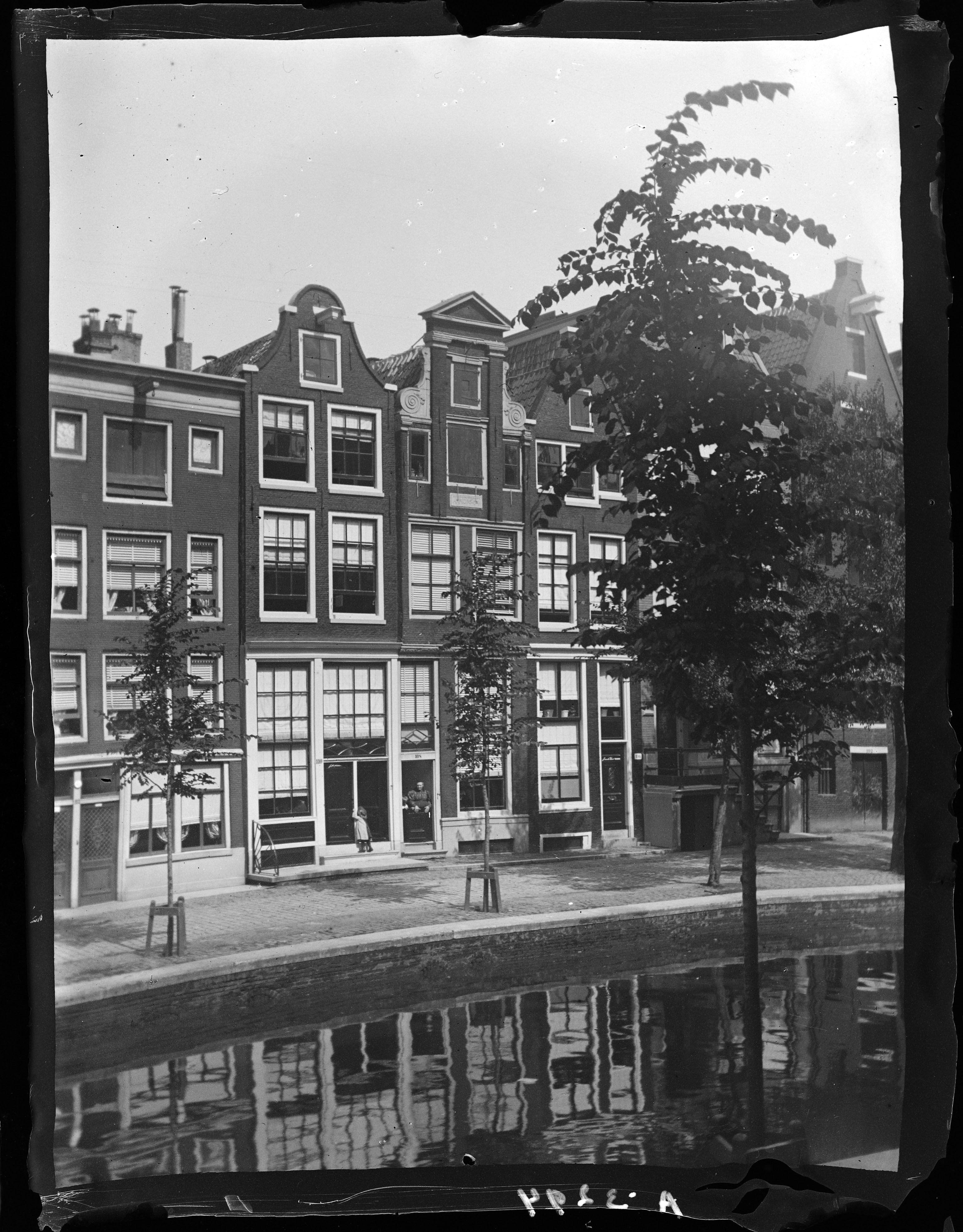
Young 'Pitteurs', Bloemgracht, Amsterdam, c.1900 (photo Benjamin Wilhelmus Stomps)

=== Putative specimens ===
A pruned U. × hollandica with large, rounded, convex leaves, and obtuse teeth, exactly matching Morren's 1848 leaf-drawing of 'Pitteurs', stands in Portland Road, Hove (2016).

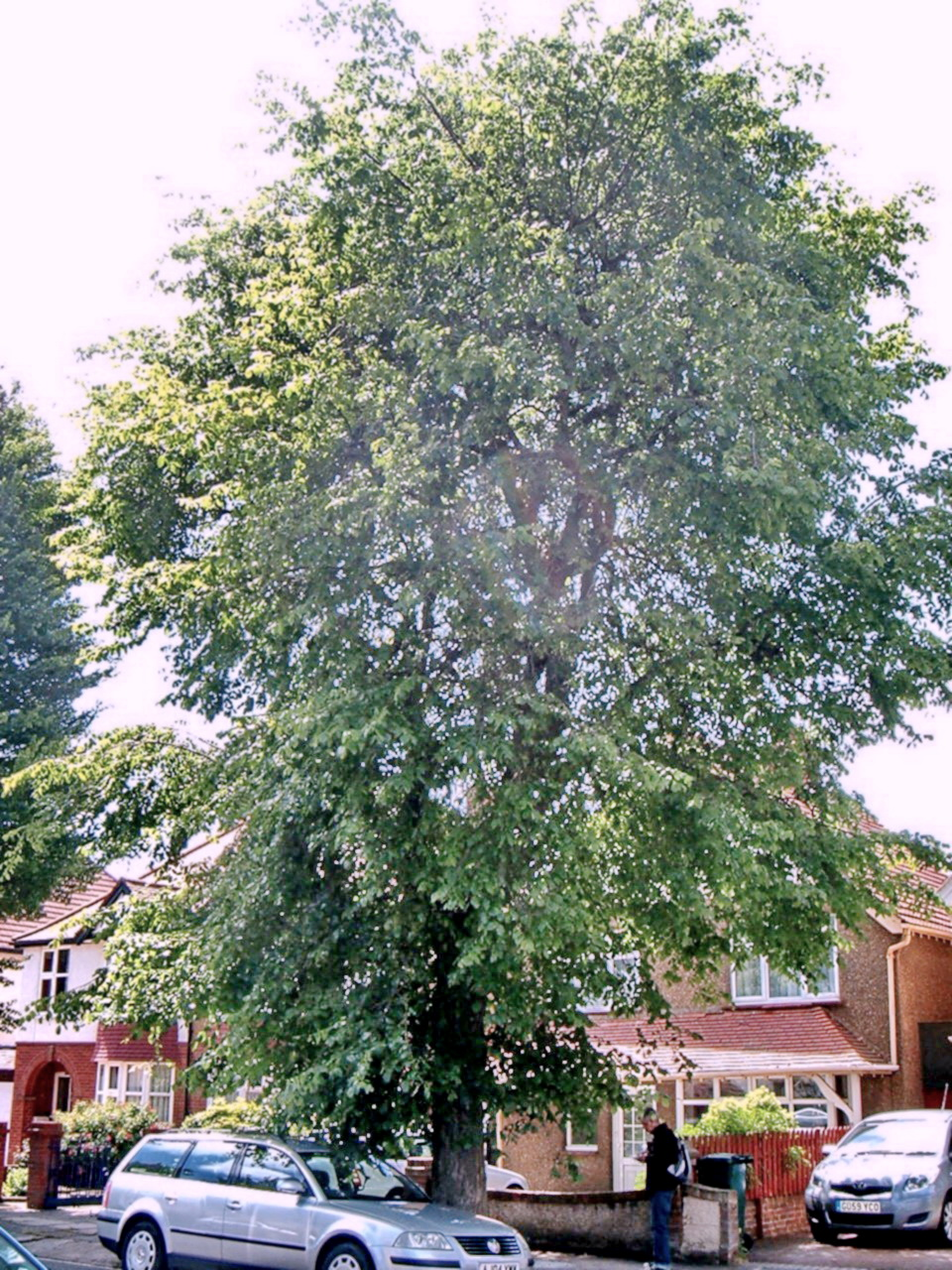
Portland Road tree, Hove (2004)

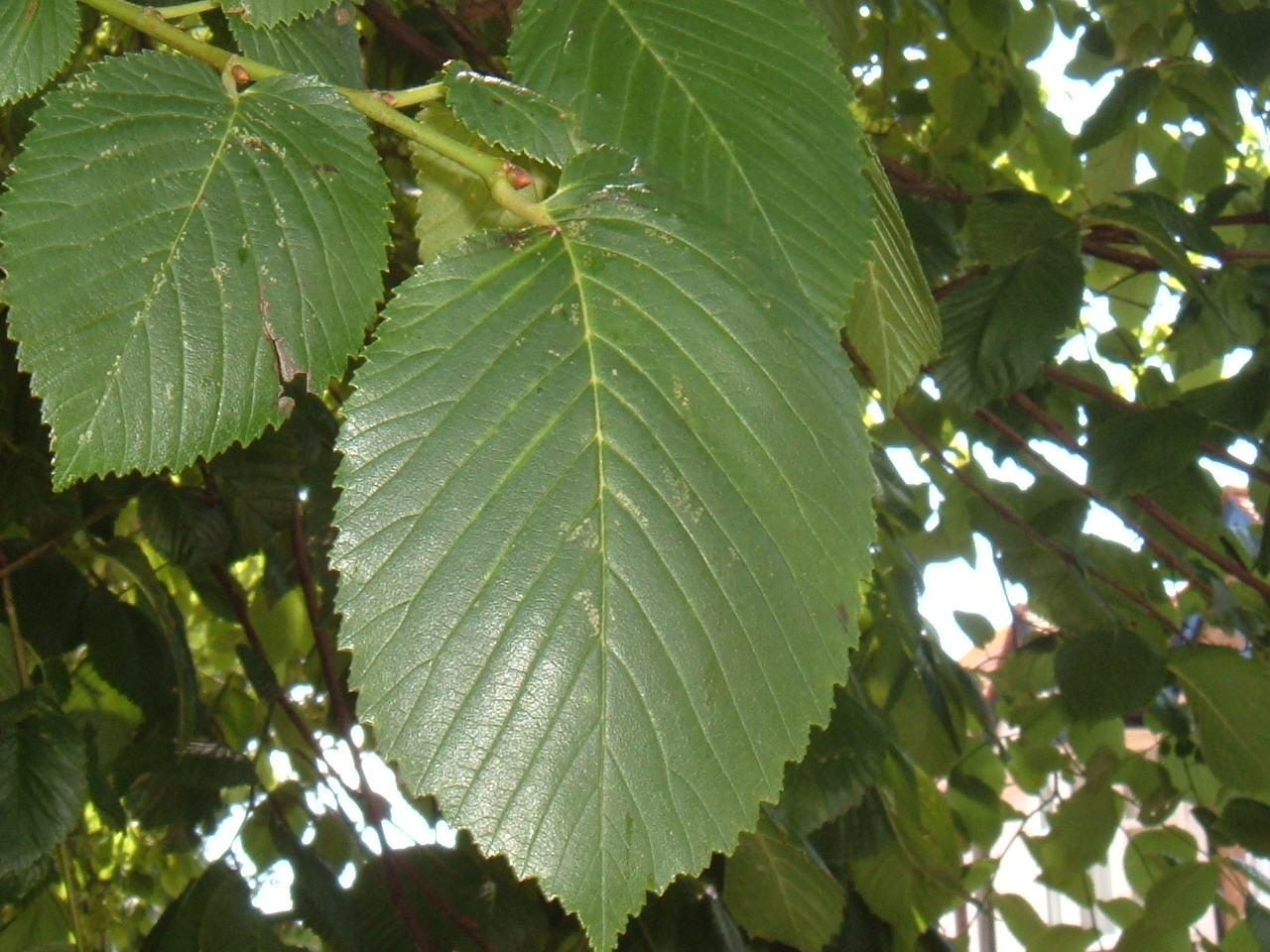
Long-shoot leaves of Portland Road tree

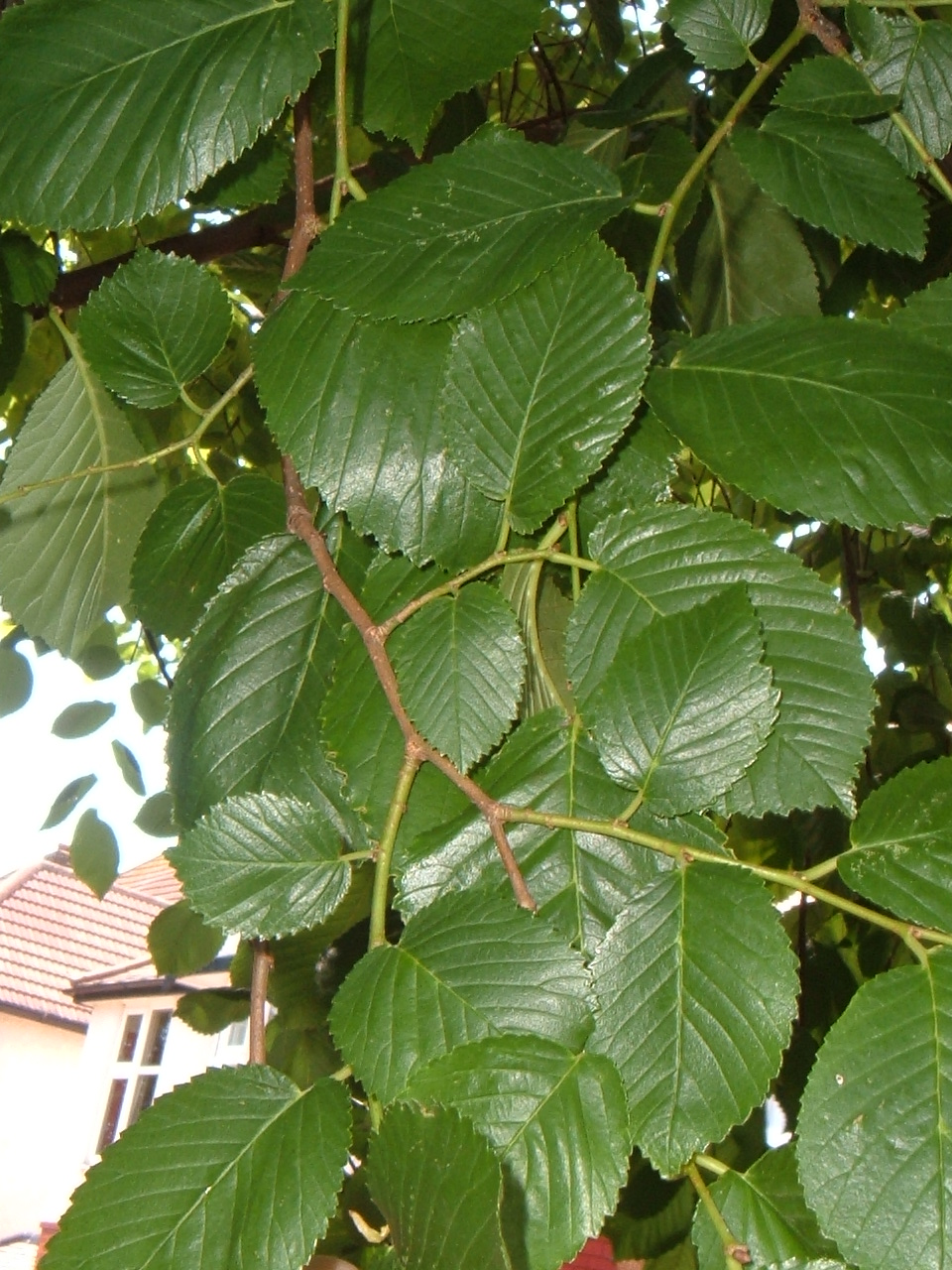
Long- and short-shoot leaves of Portland Road tree

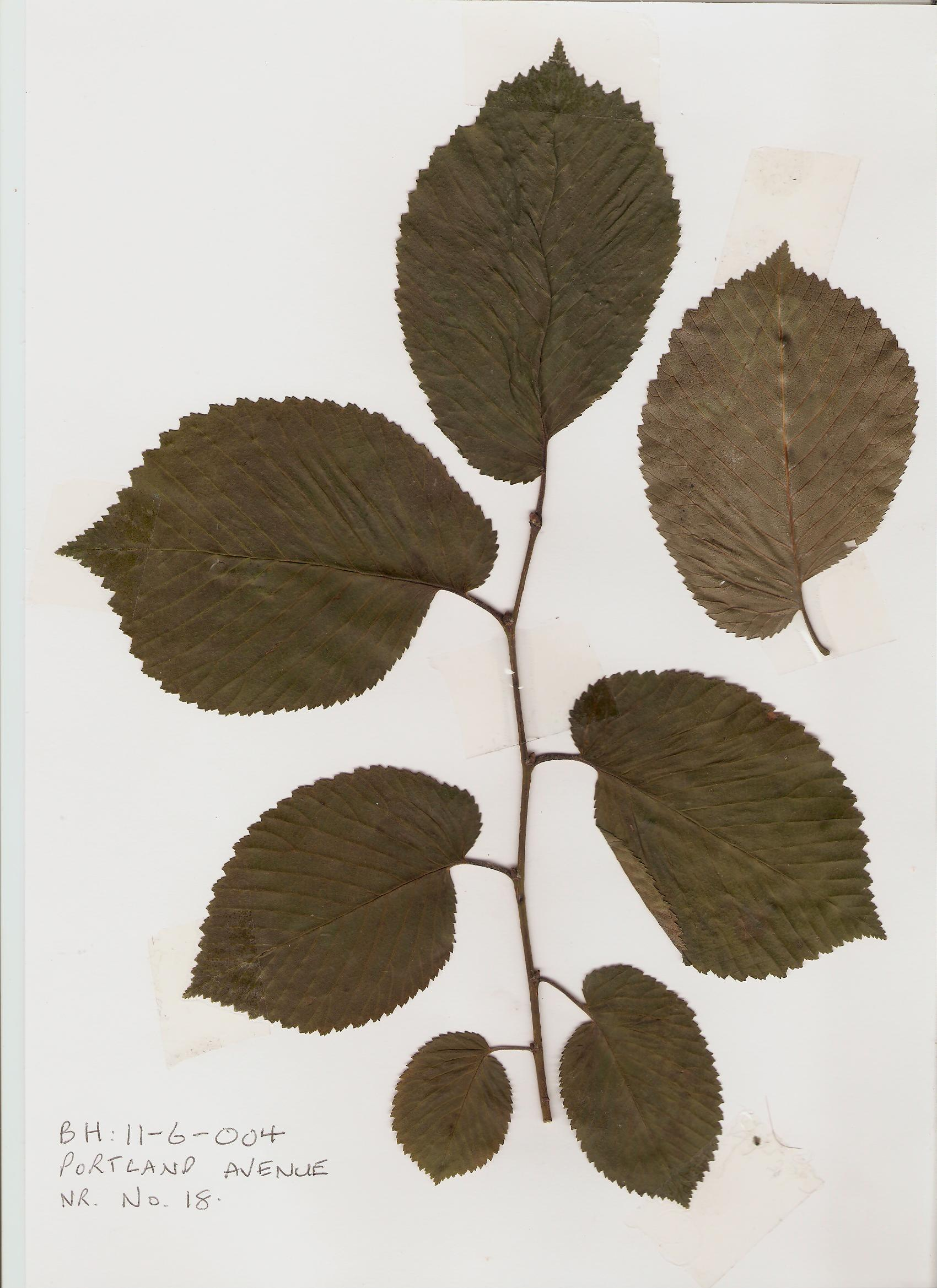
Pressed leaves of Portland Road tree

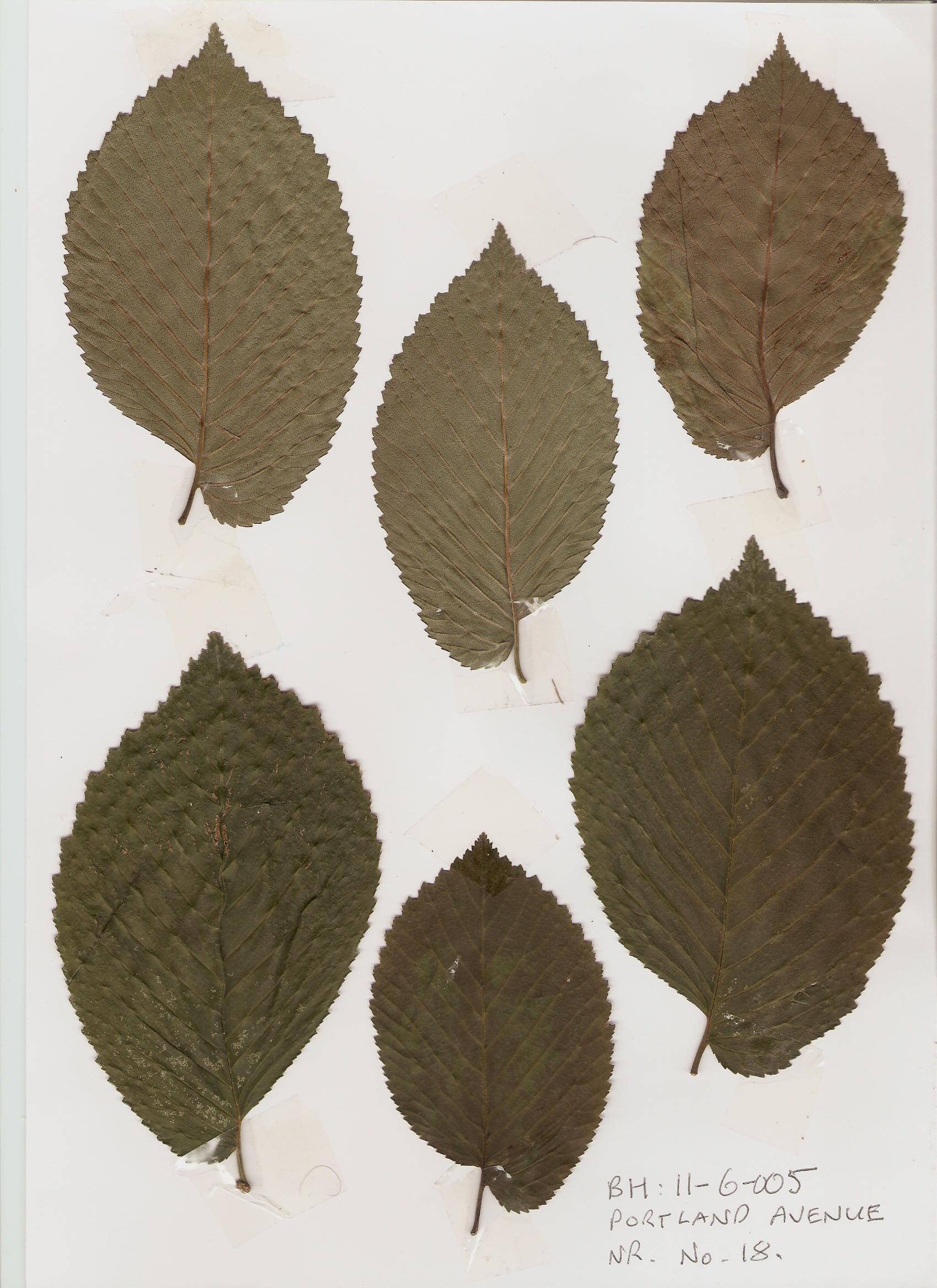
Pressed leaves of Portland Road tree

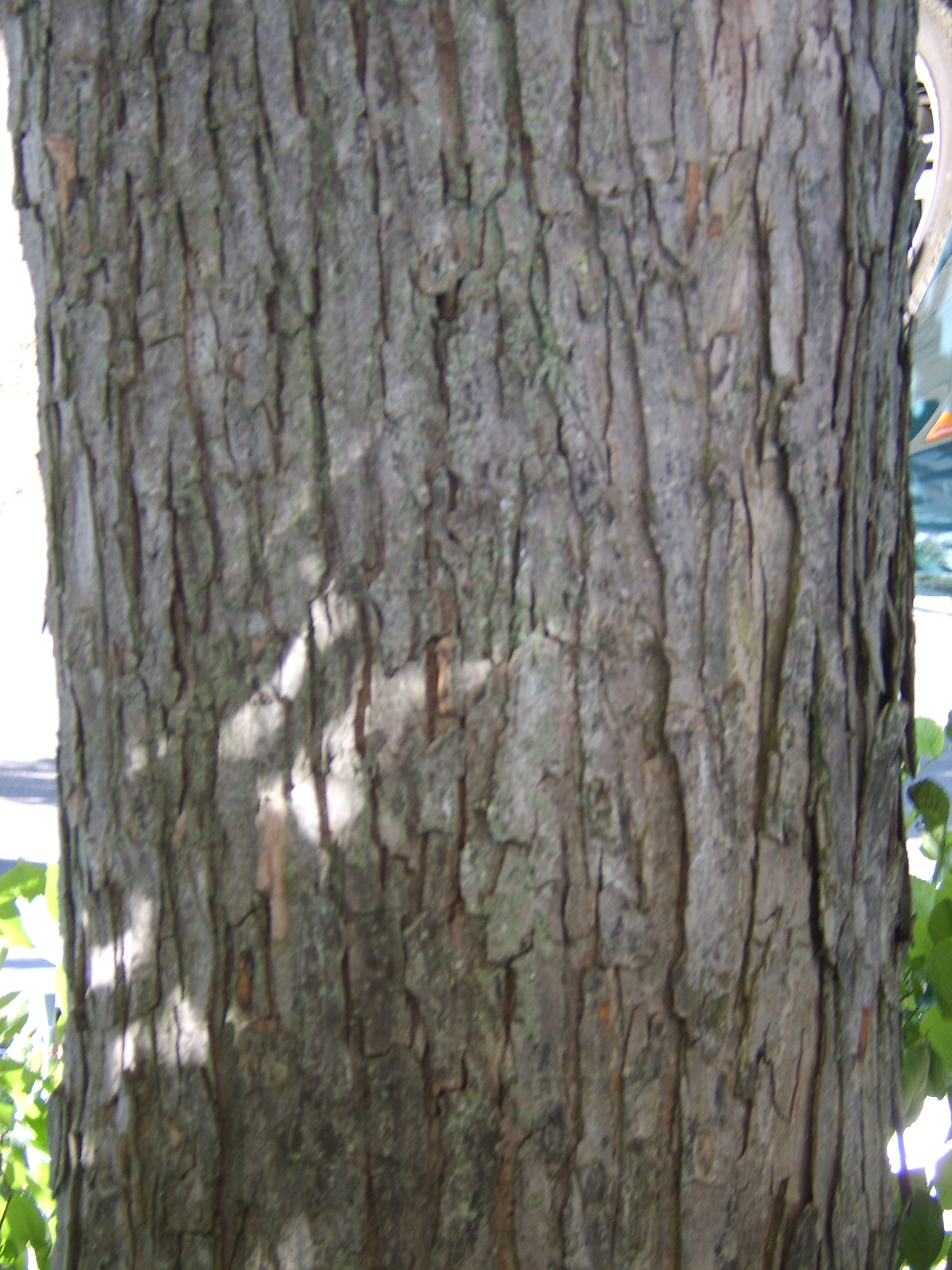
Bark of Portland Road tree

A second tree, also pruned, in Hove Recreation Ground, has leaves matching a Royal Botanic Garden Edinburgh 1903 'Pitteurs' herbarium specimen.

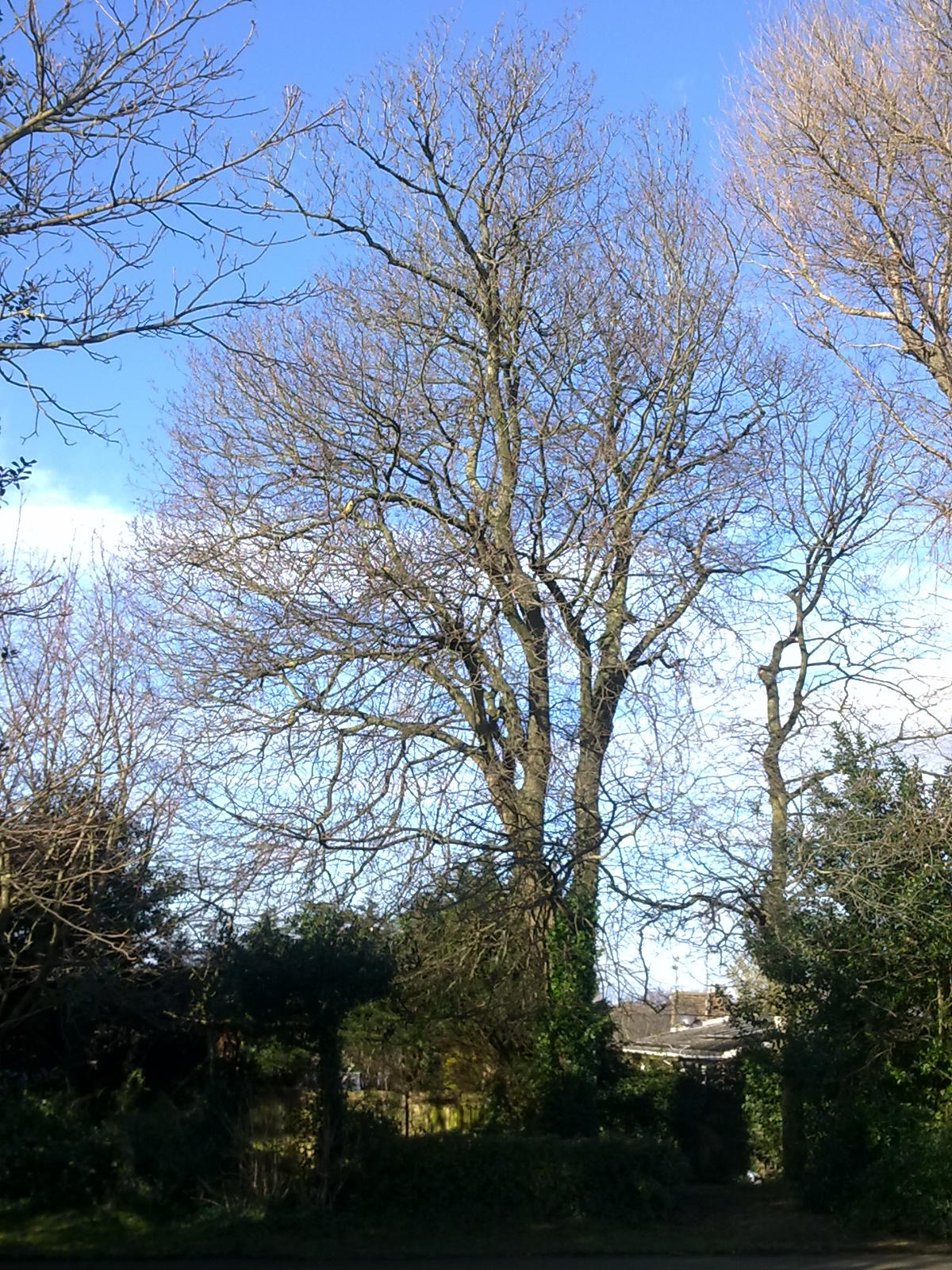
Hove Recreation Ground tree (2013)

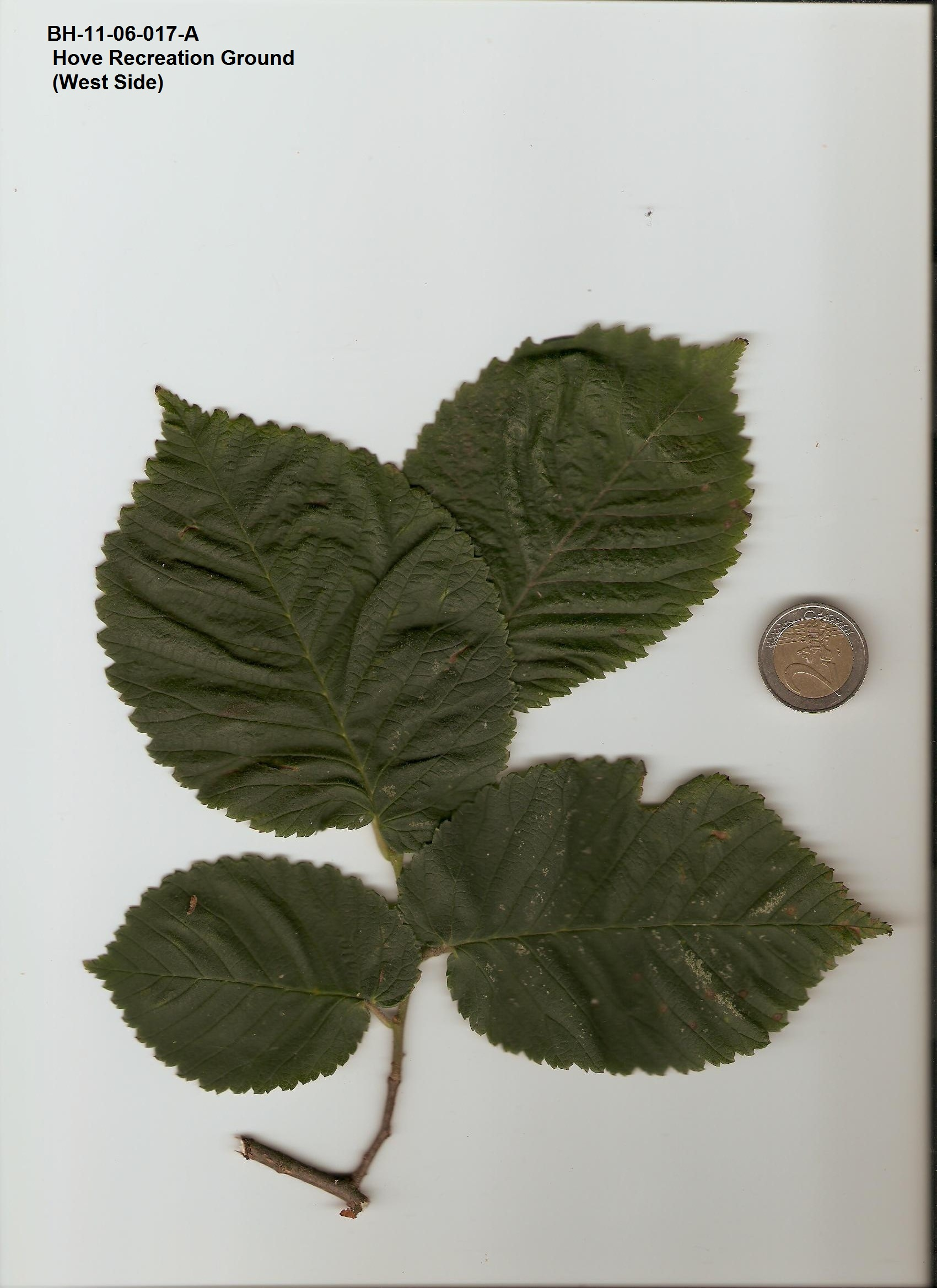
Pressed leaves of Hove Recreation Ground tree

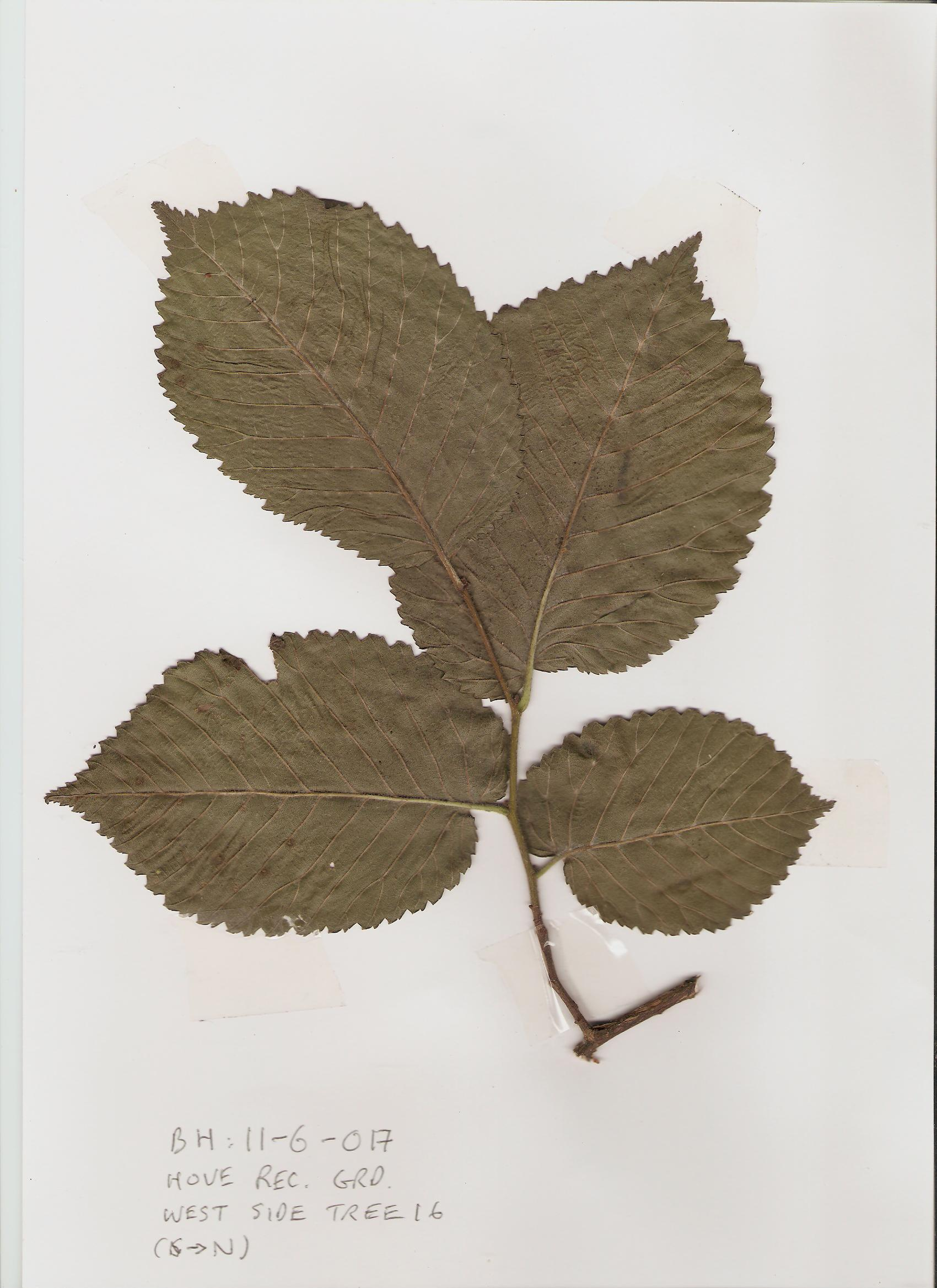
Pressed leaves of Hove Recreation Ground tree

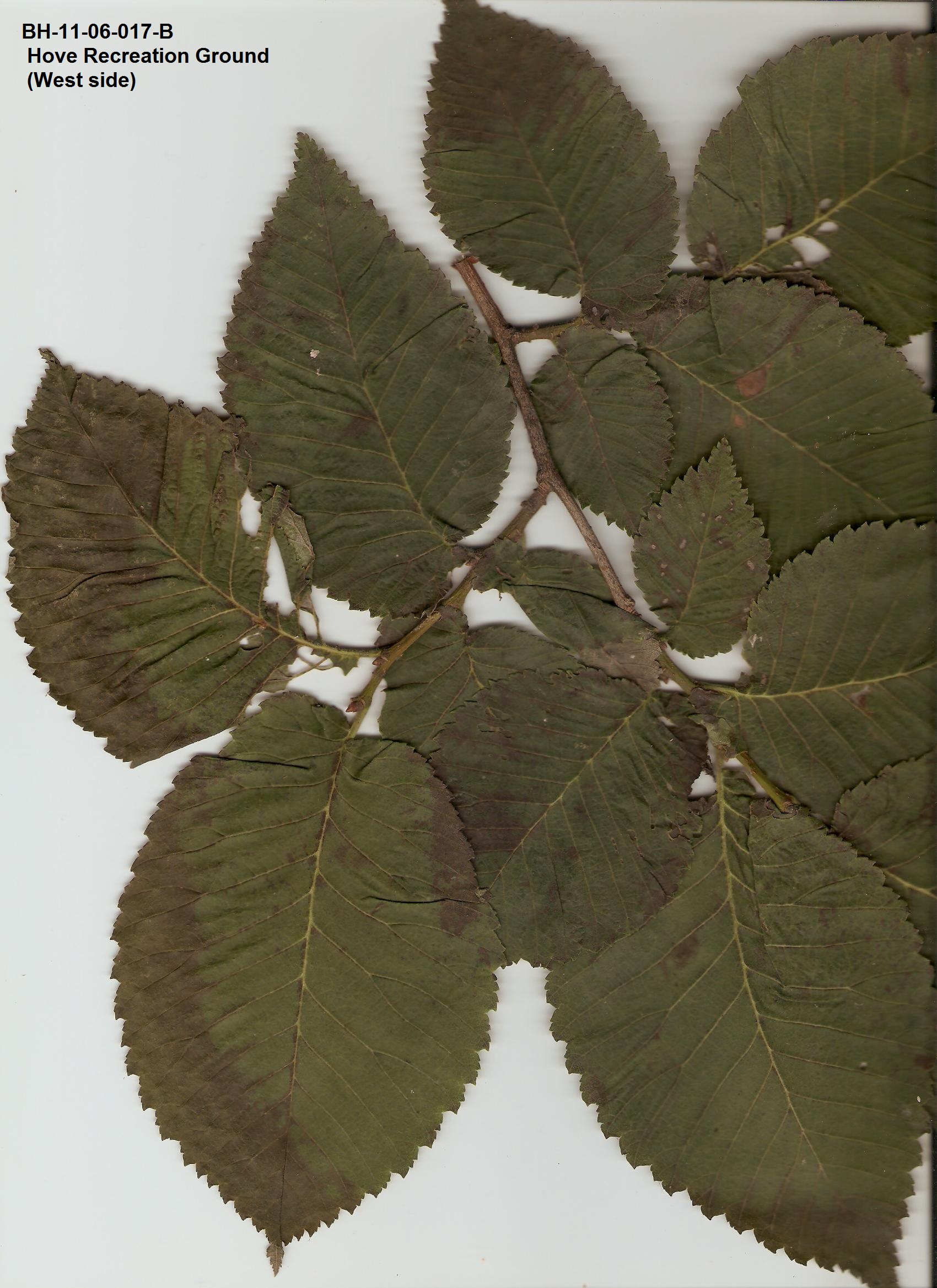
Pressed leaves of Hove Recreation Ground tree

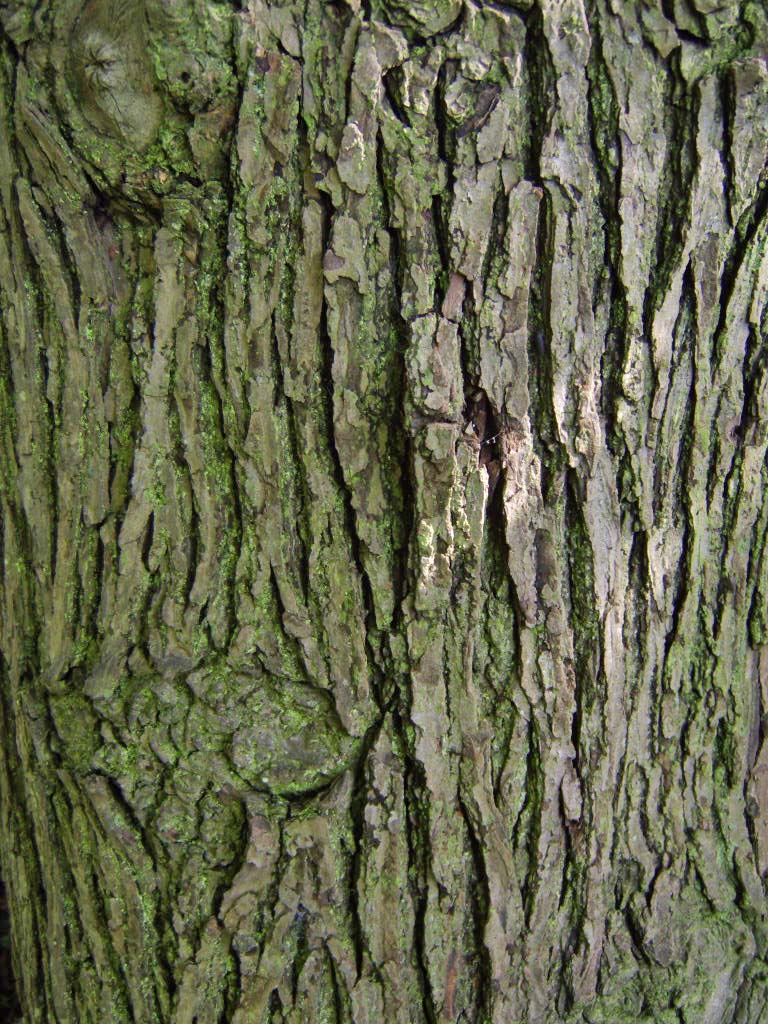
Bark of Hove Recreation Ground tree

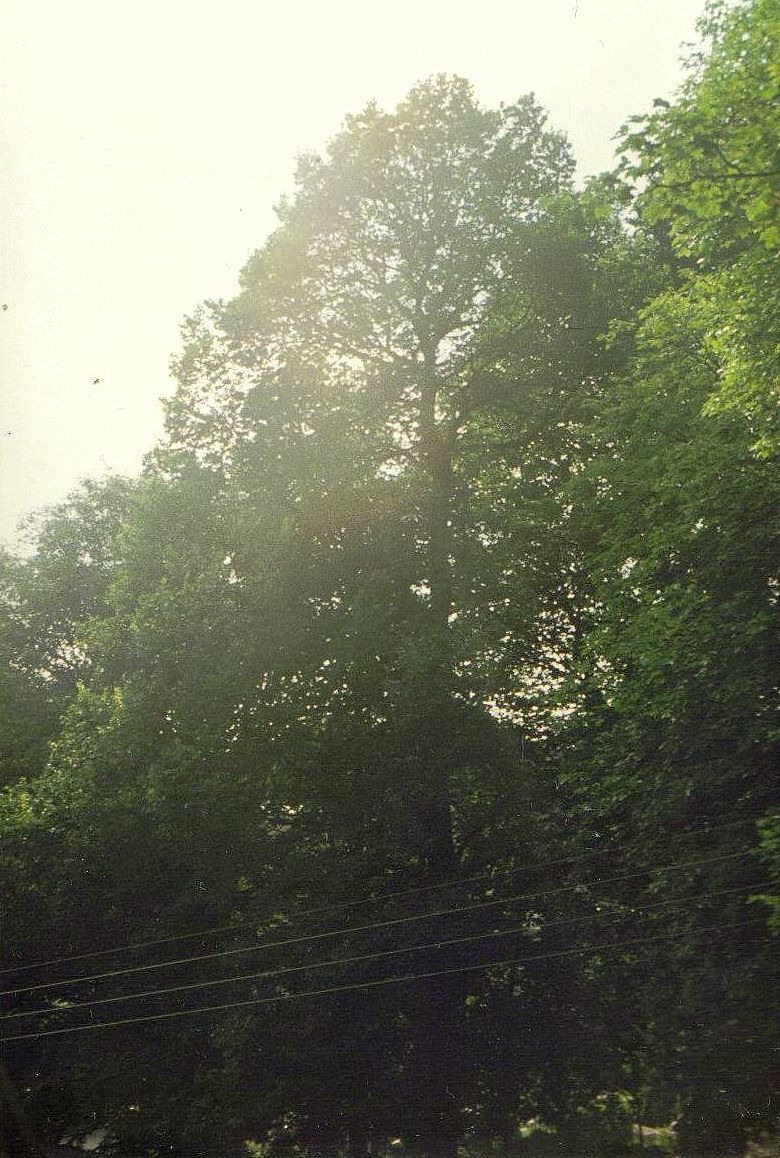
Extra Mural Cemetery tree, Brighton, blown down in 1987

A putative specimen in the Extra Mural Cemetery in Brighton, was blown down in the Great Storm of 1987 (see gallery).

== Accessions ==
None known.

== Hybrid cultivars ==
'Pitteurs' was crossed with other Ulmus × hollandica in the Dutch elm breeding programme before World War II, but none of the progeny were retained.

== Synonymy ==
- l'Orme gras
- ?l'Orme St. Trond
- Ulmus campestris latifolia, foliis rotundata: Morren, Journal d'agriculture pratique 4: 509, 511, 1851.
- Ulmus campestris var pitteursii: Wesmael in Bulletin de la Fédération des sociétés d'horticulture de Belgique 1862: 382, 1863.
- Ulmus scabra macrophylla Hort.: Dieck, (Zöschen, Germany), Haupt-catalog der Obst- und gehölzbaumschulen des ritterguts Zöschen bei Merseburg 1885 p. 82.
