= Ulmus × hollandica 'Folia Rhomboidea' =

Elm cultivar

- Hybrid parentage: U. glabra × U. minor
- Cultivar: 'Folia Rhomboidea'
- Origin: Belgium

Ulmus × hollandica 'Folia Rhomboidea' is one of a number of cultivars possibly arising from the crossing of the Wych Elm Ulmus glabra with a variety of Field Elm Ulmus minor. First mentioned by Morren in 1851 as U. campestris latifolia, foliis rhomboides.

== Description ==
Reputed to resemble 'Pitteurs' but for the rhomboid shape of the leaf.

== Cultivation ==
Once grown on the Pitteurs estate, Sint-Truiden, Belgium. No specimens are known to survive.
