= List of historic sites of Japan (Kumamoto) =

This list is of the historic sites of Japan located within the Prefecture of Kumamoto.

== National Historic Sites ==
As of 1 August 2025, forty-eight Sites have been designated as being of national significance (including one *Special Historic Site); Miike coal mine spans the prefectural borders with Fukuoka.

Site	Municipality	Comments	Image	Coordinates	Type	Ref.
*Kumamoto Castle Site 熊本城跡; Kumamoto-jō ato	Kumamoto			32°48′22″N 130°42′23″E	2	
Chibusan-Obusan Kofun チブサン・オブサン古墳; Chibusan-Obusan kofun	Yamaga			33°01′50″N 130°40′03″E	1	
Adaka-Kurobashi Shell Mound 阿高・黒橋貝塚; Adaka-Kurobashi kaizuka	Kumamoto			32°42′09″N 130°43′26″E	1	
Idera Kofun 井寺古墳; Idera kofun	Kashima			32°45′11″N 130°46′40″E	1	
Uto Castle ruins 宇土城跡; Uto-jō ato	Uto			32°40′45″N 130°38′46″E	2	
Eianji Higashi Kofun - Eianji Nishi Kofun 永安寺東古墳・永安寺西古墳; Eianji Higashi kofun・Eianji Nishi kofun	Tamana			33°22′21″N 130°44′28″E	1	
Kamao Kofun 釜尾古墳; Kamao kofun	Kumamoto			32°50′20″N 130°41′48″E	1	
Iwabaru Kofun cluster 岩原古墳群; Iwabaru kofun cluster	Yamaga			32°59′46″N 130°40′11″E	1	
Kikuchi Castle ruins 鞠智城跡; Kikuchi-jō ato	Kikuchi, Yamaga	mentioned in Shoku Nihongi in 698		33°00′08″N 130°47′09″E	2	
Kumamoto Domain Hosokawa Clan Cemetery 熊本藩主細川家墓所; Kumamoto-han-shu Hosokawa-ke bosho	Kumamoto	at Taishō-ji (泰勝寺)		32°47′45″N 130°41′30″E	7	
Kumamoto Han Kawashiri Rice Warehouses 熊本藩川尻米蔵跡; Kumamoto-han Kawashiri kome-gura ato	Kumamoto	designation includes the sites of the Tojō Warehouse (外城蔵跡) and its moorings		32°44′19″N 130°40′43″E	6	
Kumabe Clan Yakata ruins 隈部氏館跡; Kumabe-shi yakata ato	Yamaga			33°03′21″N 130°47′49″E	2	
Katashida Castle ruins 堅志田城跡; Katashida-jō ato	Misato			32°37′39″N 130°47′32″E	2	
Goryō Shell Mound 御領貝塚; Goryō kaizuka	Kumamoto			32°41′55″N 130°43′25″E	1	
Eta Anakannon Kofun 江田穴観音古墳; Eta Anakannon kofun	Nagomi			32°58′36″N 130°36′21″E	1	
Eta Funayama Kofun 江田船山古墳; Eta Funayama kofun	Nagomi	designation includes Tsukabōzu Kofun (塚坊主古墳) and Kokuzōtsuka Kofun (虚空蔵塚古墳); excavated NT artefacts from Eta Funayama Kofun are now at the Tokyo National Museum (see List of National Treasures of Japan (archaeological materials))		32°58′08″N 130°35′55″E	1	
Sashiki Castle ruins 佐敷城跡; Sashiki-jō ato	Ashikita			32°18′11″N 130°30′10″E	2	
Odara Kofun 小田良古墳; Odara kofun	Uki			32°38′57″N 130°29′37″E	1	
Hitoyoshi Castle ruins 人吉城跡; Hitoyoshi-jō ato	Hitoyoshi			32°12′40″N 130°45′51″E	2	
Suizen-ji Jōju-en 水前寺成趣園; Suizenji Jōju-en	Kumamoto	also a Place of Scenic Beauty		32°47′28″N 130°44′05″E	8	
Satsuma Rebellion Sites 西南戦争遺跡 seinan sensō iseki	Gyokutō, Kumamoto			32°54′42″N 130°39′06″E	2	
Ishinukinagi Cave Tomb Cluster 石貫ナギノ横穴群; Ishinukinagi no yokoana-gun	Tamana			32°58′03″N 130°33′53″E	1	
Ishinuki Anakannon Cave Tombs 石貫穴観音横穴; Ishinuki Anakannon yokoana	Tamana			32°58′09″N 130°33′47″E	1	
Segonkō Kofun (A) 千金甲古墳 (乙号); Segonkō kofun (otsugō)	Kumamoto			32°47′04″N 130°37′51″E	1	
Segonkō Kofun (B) 千金甲古墳 (甲号); Segonkō kofun (kōgō)	Kumamoto			32°47′04″N 130°37′51″E	1	
Ōmura Cave Tomb Cluster 大村横穴群; Ōmura yokoana-gun	Hitoyoshi			32°12′58″N 130°45′09″E	1	
Daibō Kofun 大坊古墳; Daibō kofun	Tamana			32°56′56″N 130°34′13″E	1	
Ōno-no-Iwa Kofun 大野窟古墳; Ōno-no-Iwa kofun	Hikawa			32°34′20″N 130°42′06″E	1	
Tanasoko Castle ruins 棚底城跡; Tanasoko-jō ato	Amakusa			32°24′54″N 130°20′03″E	2	
Chihen-ji ruins 池辺寺跡; Chihenji ato	Kumamoto			32°47′55″N 130°39′15″E	3	
Tsukawara Kofun Cluster 塚原古墳群; Tsukawara kofun-gun	Kumamoto			32°41′23″N 130°44′13″E	1	
Tanaka Castle ruins 田中城跡; Tanaka-jō ato	Nagomi			33°04′41″N 130°35′44″E	2	
Nabeta Cave Tombs 鍋田横穴; Nabeta yokoana	Yamaga			33°01′13″N 130°40′16″E	1	
Futagoyama Stone Tool Production Site 二子山石器製作遺跡; Futagoyama sekki-seisaku iseki	Kōshi			32°54′23″N 130°44′31″E	6	
Yatsushiro Castle Sites 八代城跡群; Yatsushiro shiro ato	Yatsushiro	designation includes the sites of Furufumoto Castle (古麓城跡), Mugishima Castle (麦島城跡), and Yatsushiro Castle (八代城跡)		32°30′27″N 130°36′00″E	2	
Tomioka Christian Memorial 富岡吉利支丹供養碑; Tomioka Kirishitan kuyōhi	Reihoku			32°30′41″N 130°02′27″E	3	
Benkei-ga-ana Kofun 弁慶ヶ穴古墳; Benkeigaana kofun	Yamaga			33°01′33″N 130°41′09″E	1	
Katōda Higashibaru Site 方保田東原遺跡; Katōda Higashibaru iseki	Yamaga			32°59′53″N 130°43′03″E	1	
Bungo Kaidō 豊後街道; Bungo Kaidō	Aso/Ubuyama			32°58′14″N 131°13′33″E	6	
Buzen Kaidō 豊前街道; Buzen Kaidō	Nankan	designation includes the sites of the Nankan Tea House (南関御茶屋跡) and Harakirizaka (腹切坂)		33°03′44″N 130°32′30″E	6	
Nozu Kofun Cluster 野津古墳群; Nozu kofun-gun	Hikawa			32°33′34″N 130°41′33″E	1	
Mitsui Miike Coal Mine Sites 三井三池炭鉱跡; Mitsui Miike tankō ato	Arao	designation includes the sites of Miyahara Pit (宮原坑跡) and Manda Pit (万田坑跡) and an area of Ōmuta in Fukuoka Prefecture; inscribed on the UNESCO World Heritage List as one of the Sites of Japan’s Meiji Industrial Revolution: Iron and Steel, Shipbuilding and Coal Mining		33°00′49″N 130°27′22″E	6	
Jinnouchi Castle ruins 陣ノ内城跡; Jinnouchi-jō ato	Kōsa			32°38′58″N 130°48′58″E		
Yatsushiro Sea Polder Site 八代海干拓遺跡; Yatsushiro-kai kantaku iseki	Yatsushiro			32°32′00″N 130°34′49″E		
Kumamoto Domain Takase Rice Warehouse Site 熊本藩高瀬米蔵跡; Kumamoto-han Takase komegura ato	Tamana			32°55′25″N 130°33′43″E	6	
Todoroki Shell Mound 轟貝塚; Todoroki kaizuka	Uto			32°40′48″N 130°38′27″E	1	
Kikuchi Clan Site 菊池氏遺跡; Kikuchi-shi iseki	Kikuchi			32°58′20″N 130°48′38″E		
Taragi Sagara Clan Site 多良木相良氏遺跡; Taragi Sagara-shi iseki	Taragi					

== Prefectural Historic Sites ==
As of 1 August 2024, seventy-nine Sites have been designated as being of prefectural importance.

Site	Municipality	Comments	Image	Coordinates	Type	Ref.
Fujio Dolmen Cluster 藤尾支石墓群; Fujio shiseki bogun	Kikuchi			32°57′11″N 130°52′04″E		for all refs see
Nagaiwa Cave Tomb Cluster 長岩横穴群; Nagaiwa yokoana-gun	Yamaga			33°00′02″N 130°39′57″E		
Kamimikura Kofun 上御倉古墳; Kamimikura kofun	Aso			32°59′18″N 131°07′26″E		
Shimomikura Kofun 下御倉古墳; Shimomikura kofun	Aso			32°59′18″N 131°07′26″E		
Nakadōri Kofun Cluster 中通古墳群; Nakadōri kofun-gun	Aso			32°57′56″N 131°06′28″E		
Jō Cave Tomb Cluster 城横穴群; Jō yokoana-gun	Yamaga			33°02′20″N 130°40′28″E		
Kyōgamine Cave Tomb Cluster 京ガ峰横穴群; Kyōgamine yokoana-gun	Nishiki			32°12′15″N 130°48′00″E		
Jōsui-ji Site 浄水寺跡; Jōsuiji ato	Uki			32°38′23″N 130°44′27″E		
Mount Shōtai Old Kiln Sites 小岱山古窯跡群; Shōtai-san koyōshi-gun	Arao					
Mount Shōtai Steel Production Sites 小岱山製鉄跡群; Shōtai-san seitetsu ato-gun	Arao			32°58′39″N 130°30′51″E		
Sagara Family Graves 相良家墓地; Sagaraura-ke bochi	Hitoyoshi			32°13′05″N 130°46′22″E		
Ōsozō Kofun Cluster 大鼠蔵古墳群; Ōsozō kofun-gun	Yatsushiro			32°28′44″N 130°34′14″E		
Myōken Jōgū Site 妙見上宮跡; Myōken Jōgū ato	Yatsushiro			32°29′06″N 130°39′35″E		
Kōda Ware Hirayama Kiln Site 高田焼平山窯跡; Kōda-yaki Hirayama kama ato	Yatsushiro			32°28′08″N 130°36′32″E		
Shōgo-ji Site 聖護寺跡; Shōgo-ji ato	Kikuchi			33°03′57″N 130°52′54″E		
Shōkan-ji Cornerstones 正観寺の礎石群; Shōkanji no soseki-gun	Kikuchi			32°59′02″N 130°49′02″E		
Mangan-ji Stone Tō and Cryptomeria 満願寺石塔群附杉群; Manganji sekitō-gun tsuketari sugimura	Minamioguni			33°04′34″N 131°05′45″E		
Endai-ji Rock Buddhas 円台寺磨崖仏群; Endaiji magaibutsu-gun	Kumamoto			32°52′59″N 130°39′13″E		
Urayama Cave Tomb Cluster 浦山横穴群; Urayama yokoana-gun	Kumamoto			32°49′14″N 130°44′38″E		
Daiji-ji Precinct 大慈寺境内; Daijiji keidai	Kumamoto			32°44′00″N 130°41′22″E		
Shōren-ji Stone Stelai 青蓮寺古塔碑群; Shōrenji kotōhi-gun	Taragi			32°16′40″N 130°56′48″E		
Saian-ji Site 西安寺跡; Saianji ato	Gyokutō			32°53′32″N 130°38′09″E		
Inasa Haiji Site 稲佐廃寺跡; Inasa haiji ato	Gyokutō			32°55′14″N 130°36′47″E		
Kudama Castle Site 久玉城跡; Kudama-jō ato	Amakusa			32°13′17″N 130°02′00″E		
Umatsuka Kofun 馬塚古墳; Umatsuka kofun	Yamaga			33°02′18″N 130°40′31″E		
Tanokawachi No.1 Kofun 田川内第一号古墳; Tanokawachi daiichi-gō kofun	Yatsushiro	decorated kofun		32°26′34″N 130°35′14″E		
Daiōzan Kofun No.3 大王山古墳第三号; Daiōzan kofun daisan-gō	Yatsushiro			32°32′N 130°41′E		
Sakuranoue Cave Tomb Cluster 桜の上横穴群; Sakuranoue yokoana bogun	Yamaga			32°59′58″N 130°40′10″E		
Mochimatsu Tsukahara Kofun 持松塚原古墳; Mochimatsu Tsukahara kofun	Yamaga			32°59′04″N 130°41′11″E		
Miyazaki Brothers First Residence 宮崎兄弟の生家; Miyazaki kyōdai no seika	Arao			32°59′05″N 130°26′05″E		
Tokutomi Former Residence (Ōe Gijuku Site) 徳富旧邸(大江義塾跡); Ōe Gijuku ato	Kumamoto			32°48′11″N 130°43′15″E		
Ōtohana Kofun Cluster 大戸鼻古墳群; Ōtohana kofun-gun	Kami-Amakusa			32°31′30″N 130°27′31″E		
Wakamiya Kofun 若宮古墳; Wakamiya kofun	Nagomi			32°58′40″N 130°36′21″E		
Inariyama Kofun 稲荷山古墳; Inariyama kofun	Kumamoto			32°49′45″N 130°43′00″E		
Tsukejiro Cave Tomb Cluster 付城横穴群; Tsukejiro yokoana-gun	Yamaga			33°02′20″N 130°40′28″E		
Jion-ji Kyōzuka Kofun 慈恩寺経塚古墳; Jionji kyōzuka kofun	Kumamoto			32°57′23″N 130°43′06″E		
Uemura Ware Kiln Site and Ash Fields 上村焼窯跡及び灰原; Uemura yaki-kama ato oyobi haihara	Asagiri					
Aoki Sanskrit Inscriptions 青木磨崖梵字群; Aoki magai bonji-gun	Tamana			32°57′35″N 130°35′03″E		
Mutabaru Site 無田原遺跡; Mutabaru iseki	Ōzu			32°55′47″N 130°52′39″E		
Takahama Ware Kiln Site and Ash Fields 高浜焼窯跡及び灰原; Takahama-yaki kama ato oyobi haibara	Amakusa			32°23′15″N 130°02′14″E		
Nagasare Kofun 長砂連古墳; Nagasare kofun	Kami-Amakusa			32°33′14″N 130°26′52″E		
Kesao Takatsuka Kofun 袈裟尾高塚古墳; Kesao Takatsuka kofun	Kikuchi			32°59′30″N 130°47′46″E		
Chōriki Cave No.1 長刀横穴一号; Chōriki yokoana ichi-gō	Nagomi			32°58′13″N 130°36′14″E		
Kazuhara Kofun 桂原古墳; Kazuhara kofun	Uki			32°38′17″N 130°38′05″E		
Narasaki Kofun 楢崎古墳; Narasaki kofun	Uto			32°40′41″N 130°41′32″E		
Saizono Kofun Cluster 才園古墳群; Saizono kofun-gun	Asagiri			32°13′47″N 130°52′13″E		
Oni-no-Kama Kofun 鬼の釜古墳; Oni-no-kama kofun	Asagiri			32°14′53″N 130°54′12″E		
Chōmeijizaka Kofun Cluster 長明寺坂古墳群; Chōmeijizaka kofun-gun	Kikuchi			32°57′23″N 130°45′08″E		
Ōda Ware Kiln Site 網田焼窯跡; Ōda-yaki kama ato	Uto			32°40′17″N 130°33′55″E		
Kamezuka Kofun Cluster No.1 Tumulus 亀塚古墳群一号墳; Kamezuka kofun-gun ichi-gō fun	Nishiki			32°11′55″N 130°49′41″E		
Ugadake Kofun 宇賀岳古墳; Ugadake kofun	Uki			32°39′26″N 130°40′53″E		
Tsubukuro Kofun Cluster 津袋古墳群; Tsubukuro kofun-gun	Yamaga			33°00′46″N 130°45′03″E		
Goryōzuka Kofun 御霊塚古墳; Goryōzuka kofun	Yamaga			33°02′02″N 130°41′25″E		
Rokutan Steel Production Site 六反製鉄跡; Rokutan seitetsu ato	Tamana			32°58′42″N 130°32′45″E		
Jōnohara Government Forces Cemetery 城ノ原官軍墓地; Jōnohara kangun bochi	Nankan	for those who died during the Satsuma Rebellion of 1877		33°03′46″N 130°32′32″E		
Koeimachi Government Forces Cemetery 肥猪町官軍墓地; Koeimachi kangun bochi	Nankan	180 grave markers for those who died during the Satsuma Rebellion		33°02′N 130°35′E		
Shimoiwa Government Forces Cemetery 下岩官軍墓地; Shimoiwa kangun bochi	Nagomi					
Meitoku Government Forces Cemetery 明徳官軍墓地; Meitoku kangun bochi	Kumamoto			32°47′47″N 130°41′17″E		
Jinnai Government Forces Cemetery 陣内官軍墓地; Jinnai kangun bochi	Minamata			32°12′29″N 130°24′50″E		
Karimata Kofun 仮又古墳; Karimata kofun	Uto			32°40′54″N 130°38′00″E		
Imaizumi Steel Production Site 今泉製鉄跡; Imaizumi seitetsu ato	Yatsushiro			32°28′12″N 130°38′26″E		
Nanamoto Government Forces Cemetery 七本官軍墓地; Nanamoto kangun bochi	Kumamoto			32°54′15″N 130°39′37″E		
Nishihara Steel Production Site 西原製鉄遺跡; Nishihara seitetsu iseki	Gyokutō			32°53′24″N 130°37′39″E		
Ōno-no-Iwa Kofun 大野窟古墳; Ōno-no-Iwa kofun	Hikawa	in part a national Historic Site		32°34′20″N 130°42′06″E		
Iwabaru Cave Tomb Cluster 岩原横穴群; Iwabaru yokoana-gun	Yamaga			32°59′47″N 130°40′09″E		
Bettōzuka Kofun Cluster 別当塚古墳群; Bettōzuka kofun-gun	Arao			32°59′43″N 130°28′15″E		
Shōdai Ware Kiln Sites 小代焼窯跡群; Shōdai-yaki kama ato-gun	Nankan			33°00′15″N 130°31′22″E		
Tsutsujigaoka Cave Tombs つつじケ丘横穴群; Tsutsujigaoka yokoana-gun	Kumamoto			32°49′10″N 130°44′38″E		
Kayanokidani Site 柏木谷遺跡; Kayanokidani iseki	Minamiaso			32°49′10″N 131°02′26″E		
Shōfuku-ji Old Stelai 勝福寺古塔碑群; Shōfukuji kotō higun	Asagiri			32°16′04″N 130°53′09″E		
Ōya Site 大矢遺跡; Ōya iseki	Amakusa			32°27′54″N 130°11′53″E		
Tokutomi Sohō & Tokutomi Kenjirō First Residence 徳富蘇峰・蘆花生家; Tokutomi Sohō・Kenjirō seika	Minamata			32°12′43″N 130°24′08″E		
Takahata-Akatate Site 高畑赤立遺跡; Takahata-Akatate iseki	Yamato			32°46′48″N 131°11′34″E		
Kyōzuka-Ōtsuka Kofun Cluster 経塚・大塚古墳群; Kyōzuka-Ōtsuka kofun-gun	Tamana			32°52′28″N 130°35′14″E		
Kunigoshi Kofun 国越古墳; Kunigoshi kofun	Uki			32°38′42″N 130°38′42″E		
Tonkararin トンカラリン; Tonkararin	Nagomi			32°58′06″N 130°36′12″E		
Babakusu Ide no Hanaguri 馬場楠井手の鼻ぐり; Babakusu ide no hanaguri	Kikuyō			32°51′06″N 130°49′53″E		
Unganzen-ji Precinct 雲巌禅寺境内; Unganzenji keidai	Kumamoto	also a Prefectural Place of Scenic Beauty		32°49′10″N 130°37′22″E		
Mangan-ji Gardens 満願寺庭園; Manganji teien	Minamioguni	also a Prefectural Place of Scenic Beauty		33°04′34″N 131°05′45″E		

== Municipal Historic Sites ==
As of 1 August 2024, a further five hundred and fifty-two Sites have been designated as being of municipal importance.

== See also ==
- Cultural Properties of Japan
- Kumamoto Prefectural Ancient Burial Mound Museum
- List of Places of Scenic Beauty of Japan (Kumamoto)
- List of Cultural Properties of Japan - paintings (Kumamoto)
- List of Cultural Properties of Japan - historical materials (Kumamoto)
- List of Cultural Properties of Japan - archaeological materials (Kumamoto)
