= Goryō Shell Mound =

Goryō Shell Midden
- 御領貝塚 (Japanese)
- Goryō Shell Midden Goryō Shell Mound (Japan)
- 32°41′55″N 130°43′25″E
- Type: shell midden
- Periods: Jōmon period
- Location: Kumamoto, Kumamoto, Japan
- Region: Kyushu

Site notes
- Public access: Yes (no facilities at site)
- National Historic Site of Japan

The Goryō Shell Midden (御領貝塚, Goryō kaizuka) is an archaeological site in what is now the Jonan neighborhood of the city of Kumamoto, Kumamoto Prefecture, Japan with an late Jōmon period shell midden. The site was designated a National Historic Site in 1940 by the Japanese government.

== Overview ==
During the early to middle Jōmon period (approximately 4000 to 2500 BC), sea levels were five to six meters higher than at present, and the ambient temperature was also 2 deg C higher. During this period, Kyushu was inhabited by the Jōmon people, many of whom lived in coastal settlements. The middens associated with such settlements contain bone, botanical material, mollusc shells, sherds, lithics, and other artifacts and ecofacts associated with the now-vanished inhabitants, and these features, provide a useful source into the diets and habits of Jōmon society. Most of these middens are found along the Pacific coast of Japan; however, this site is located at the northeast foot of Mount Gankaizan, at the southern end of the Kumamoto Plain, facing the Ariake Sea.

This shell mound dates back to the end of the late Jōmon period, (approximately 3,000 years ago), and is located near the tip of a long, narrow plateau about 200 meters wide, bordering an alluvial plain. In the shell layer, which is mainly composed of freshwater shells of Yamato-shijimi and Jōmon pottery fragments of Goryō-style. Below the shell layer earlier styles with stamped patterns have been excavated. Buried human bones showing evidence of ritual tooth ablation and artificial cranial deformation, as well as jar coffins, were also discovered. The Goryō Shell midden is one of the largest shell mounds in the Kyushu region, and is academically important as a standard site for the chronology of the Jōmon culture. To the northwest, across a depression, is the Adaka-Kurobashi Shell Mound, which has a separate National Historic Site designation. Materials from the Goryō Shell Midden are on display at the Kumamoto City Tsukahara History and Folklore Museum. The site is located about six kilometers northeast of JR Kyushu Uto Station.

== See also ==
- List of Historic Sites of Japan (Kumamoto)
