= Jinnouchi =

Jinnouchi may refer to:

== People ==
- Ayako Jinnouchi (born 1987), Japanese middle-distance runner
- Takao Jinnouchi (1933–2026), Japanese politician

== Places ==
- Jinnouchi Castle, a flatlands-style Japanese castle
