= Katashida Castle =

Castle in Kumamoto, Japan

- 堅志田城
- Misato, Kumamoto Japan

Site information
- Type: yamajiro-style Japanese castle
- Controlled by: Aso clan, Shimazu clan
- Open to the public: yes
- Condition: Archaeological and designated national historical site; castle ruins

Location
- Coordinates: 32°37′40″N 130°47′33″E

Site history
- In use: Sengoku period
- National Historic Site of Japan

Katashida Castle (堅志田城, Katashida-jō) was a Sengoku period yamajiro-style Japanese castle located in the Katashida neighborhood of the town of Misato, Kumamoto Prefecture, Japan. Its ruins have been protected as a National Historic Site since 2006.

== Overview ==
Katashida Castle was located on a mountain ridge called Shiroyama, 256 meters above sea level, on the left bank of the midstream of Midorikawa River, which flows through the center of the prefecture. The Aso clan controlled northern Higo Province, and although Katashida Castle was located in the southwest of their sphere of influence, was close to the center of Higo Province and was strategically important. Aso Korenaga (Kikuchi Taketsune) was defeated by his younger brother Aso Koretoyo and lost his base, and Korenaga's son Koremae entered the castle in 1523. Koremae had allied with the Sagara clan, but the castle fell in 1543 and came under the control of Koretoyo. After the Shimazu clan advanced to Yatsushiro Castle in 1582, it became the front line of the Aso territory. However, since Aso territory contained the Ichinomiya of Higo Province, of which the Aso clan was also the high priest, Shimazu Yoshihisa was hesitant to attack and drew lots to ask the kami if it was okay to attack. On October 5, 1582, the decision was made to attack based on drawing lots. However, Shimazu Yoshihisa again had doubts about attacking shrine territory, so on October 17, he consulted the gods' will again at Koriyama Temple in Satsuma Province. He drew a white lot, so he called off the attack. As a result, the Shimazu clan built Hana no Yamashiro Castle as a defensive castle, and the battlefront became deadlocked. In 1585, the Shimazu decided that the time was right, and captured Katashida Castle, but was forced to abandon it soon afterwards due to Toyotomi Hideyoshi's Kyūshū campaign of 1586–1587.

Nothing remains of the castle today; however, archaeological excavations have found that the castle was large in scale, with 11 enclosures and 15 moats and earthworks on the main ridge, which extends in an arc from the west to the northeast, and on the 300 meter branch ridge that extends from the west of the main ridge to the south. Many relics, including Chinese ceramics (celadon, white porcelain, and blue and white porcelain), medieval Haji ware and Sue ware, old coins, knives, and arrows, were also discovered.

== See also ==
- List of Historic Sites of Japan (Kumamoto)

== Literature ==
- Benesch, Oleg and Ran Zwigenberg (2019). Japan's Castles: Citadels of Modernity in War and Peace. Cambridge: Cambridge University Press. p. 374. ISBN 9781108481946.
- De Lange, William (2021). An Encyclopedia of Japanese Castles. Groningen: Toyo Press. pp. 600 pages. ISBN 978-9492722300.
