= Idera Kofun =

- 井寺古墳 (Japanese)
- Idera Kofun Idera Kofun (Japan)
- Interactive map of Idera Kofun
- 32°45′11.17″N 130°46′40.37″E
- Type: Kofun
- Periods: Kofun period
- Location: Kashima, Kumamoto, Japan
- Region: Kyushu

History
- Built: c.6th century

Site notes
- Public access: Yes (no facilities)

The Idera Kofun (井寺古墳) is a Kofun period burial mound in the Idera-chō neighborhood of the town of Kashima, Kumamoto, Japan. The tumulus was designated a National Historic Site of Japan in 1921, with the area under protection expanded in 2017. It is believed to have been built in the middle of the 6th century, towards the end of the Kofun period.

== Overview ==
The Idera Kofun is a round enpun (円墳) style burial mound built on a hill southeast of Kumamoto city. On the north side of the tomb is Ukishima Kumanoimasu Shrine (Ukishima Jinja), known for its spring water. In 1857, the tumulus collapsed due to earthwork, and a stone burial chamber. It was robbed in 1901 to 1902. A preliminary archaeological excavation in 1916 to 1917 confirmed that it was a decorated kofun; however a comprehensive investigation was not performed until 1982 and again from 2017 to 2019, after the 2016 Kumamoto earthquake. The tumulus has been largely leveled, and no fukiishi have been found. The urial facility is a single-chamber horizontal-entry stone room made of blocks of tuff from Mount Aso. It has an opening in the south-southwest direction. The interior, including the entrance gate, entrance passage, and stone barrier are decorated with a decorative pattern called "straight arc pattern" consisting of geometric straight lines and arcs. In addition, depending on location, "circular pattern," "ladder pattern," and "key pattern," decorations can be found. This straight arc pattern is painted in four colors: red, white, blue, and green. As the tomb had been robbed, the presence of grave goods is uncertain. However, Edo Period records state that a bronze mirror and a straight sword were found in the first area near the back wall, and human bones were found in the two areas on the left and right. However, the whereabouts of these items are now unknown. The Kumamoto City Museum has four straight iron swords, which are said to have come from the Idera Kofun. Based on decoration and artifacts, It is estimated that it was built around the late 5th century to early 6th century during the middle to late Kofun period.

The tumulus is about 11.5 kilometers from Nishi-Kumamoto Station on the JR Kyushu Kagoshima Main Line.

== See also ==
- List of Historic Sites of Japan (Kumamoto)
- Decorated kofun
