= List of cultural properties of Japan – archaeological materials (Kumamoto) =

This list is of the cultural properties of Japan designated in the category of archaeological materials (考古資料, kōko shiryō) for the Prefecture of Kumamoto.

== National Cultural Properties ==
As of 1 February 2015, four Important Cultural Properties have been designated, being of national significance.

Property	Date	Municipality	Ownership	Comments	Image	Coordinates	Ref.
Boat-Shaped Earthenware Vessel with Foot 台付舟形土器 dai tsuki funagata doki	Yayoi period	Kumamoto	Kumamoto Tsukahara Museum of History and Folklore (熊本市塚原歴史民俗資料館)			32°41′32″N 130°44′15″E	
Excavated Artefacts from the Aso Family Hama-no-gosho Site, Higo Province 肥後阿蘇氏浜御所跡出土品; Higo Aso-shi Hama-no-gosho ato shutsudo hin	Ming dynasty	Kumamoto	Kumamoto Prefectural Museum of Art			32°48′27″N 130°42′02″E	
Excavated Artefacts from Higo Mukōnoda Kofun 肥後向野田古墳出土品; Higo Mukōnoda kofun shutsudo hin	Kofun period	Uto	Uto City			32°41′09″N 130°39′27″E	
Excavated Artefacts from Mendasaizon Kofun, Kuma District, Higo Province 肥後国球磨郡免田才園古墳出土品; Higo-no-kuni Kuma-gun Mendasaizon kofun shutsudo hin	Kofun period	Kumamoto	Kumamoto Prefectural Museum of Art			32°48′27″N 130°42′02″E	

== Prefectural Cultural Properties ==
Properties designated at a prefectural level include:

Property	Date	Municipality	Ownership	Comments	Image	Coordinates	Ref.
Excavated Artefacts from Ōya Site 大矢遺跡出土品; Ōya iseki shutsudo hin	Jōmon period	Amakusa	Hondo Museum of History and Folklore (本渡歴史民俗資料館)			32°27′39″N 130°11′55″E	
Tsumanohana Tumulus Cluster and Collection of Excavated Artefacts 妻の鼻墳墓群及び出土遺物一括; Tsumanohana funbo-gun oyobi shutsudo ibutsu ikkatsu	C6	Amakusa	Hondo Museum of History and Folklore (本渡歴史民俗資料館)			32°27′39″N 130°11′55″E	
Kikōji Stone Man 木柑子石人; Kikōji sekijin		Kikuchi		height of 109 centimetres (3.58 ft)		32°56′35″N 130°47′10″E	
Excavated Plant Remains from Sōbatake Site 曽畑遺跡出土植物質資料; Sōbatake iseki shutsudo shokubutsu-shitsu shiryō	Jōmon period	Kumamoto	Kumamoto Prefectural Board of Education (kept at the Prefectural Cultural Property Study Room (県文化財資室))			32°48′22″N 130°44′19″E	
Chinese Iron Glazed Jar 磁州窯系鉄絵壺; Jishū-yōkei tetsu-e tsubo	C12-14	Kumamoto	Kumamoto Prefectural Board of Education (kept at the Prefectural Cultural Property Study Room (県文化財資室))			32°48′22″N 130°44′19″E	
Bandō-ji Sutra Container 凡導寺の経筒; Bandōji no kyōzutsu	1145	Yamaga	Kamō District (kept at Yamaga City Museum (山鹿市立博物館))			33°01′25″N 130°40′00″E	
Usutsuka Stone Man 臼塚石人; Usutsuka sekijin	Kofun period	Kumamoto	Kumamoto Prefecture (kept at Kumamoto Prefectural Museum of Art)	height of 2 metres (6.6 ft)		32°48′27″N 130°42′02″E	
Excavated Artefacts from Katōda Higashibaru Site 方保田東原遺跡出土品; Katōda Higashibaru iseki shutsudo hin	Yayoi period	Yamaga	Yamaga City (kept at Yamaga City Museum (山鹿市立博物館))	139 items, including objects of bronze, iron, and shell, and ceramics		33°01′25″N 130°40′00″E	

== See also ==
- Cultural Properties of Japan
- List of National Treasures of Japan (archaeological materials)
- List of Historic Sites of Japan (Kumamoto)
- List of Cultural Properties of Japan - historical materials (Kumamoto)
- Higo Province
