= Chihen-ji =

Chihen-ji ruins
- 池辺寺跡 (Japanese)
- Chihen-ji ruins Chihen-ji (Japan)
- 32°47′55″N 130°39′15″E
- Type: temple ruins
- Periods: Heian period
- Location: Kumamoto, Japan
- Region: Kyushu region

History
- Built: c.9th century AD

Site notes
- Public access: Yes
- National Historic Site of Japan

Chihen-ji ruins (池辺寺跡, Chihen-ji ato) is an archaeological site with the ruins of a Heian period Buddhist temple located in the Ikegami neighborhood of the city of Kumamoto, Japan. The temple no longer exists, and its ruins were designated a National Historic Site in 1997.

== History ==
Chihen-ji was located on a spur at an elevation of 130–140 meters, extending southeast from Mount Kinpu, which, at 665 meters, towers over the western part of the city. The history of the temple is uncertain. The Ikebeji Engi Emaki, which is said to have been copied from earlier sources during the Bunka era (1804–1817), states that the temple was founded by a monk from Yamato who built a temple after subduing an evil dragon, based on a legend that is recorded in the Shoku Nihongi. On the middle of Nishihirayama, northwest of the temple ruins, there is a stone stupa erected in 1337. It is commonly known as the "Kaneko Pagoda" and tells the history of Chihen Temple. According to the inscription, Chihen-ji, was founded in the Wadō era (708–713), burned down in 976 and was eventually relocated, but its original location was in a place called "Hundred Pagodas." The first on-site archaeological excavation was carried out in 1958, and in 1986, full-scale excavation work revealed the appearance of a Heian period temple site.

The buildings were placed on a stepped, rubble-built foundation measuring approximately 22 meters north-to-south and 18 meters east-to-west, in the center of the flat surface created by developing the slope. It consists of a central building and three buildings surrounding it on its east, south, and north sides, as well as a corridor connecting the three buildings, with a group of stone pagodas arranged on the slope behind them. The foundation of the central building is the highest, with the foundations of the buildings on the north and south sides being 0.35 meters lower, and the foundations of the building on the east side and the corridor being approximately one meter lower. The central building was a three by three bay structure with a foundation of cut tuff stones. The building on the south was a five bay by one bay structure, and the building to the east was a three by two bay structure. The building on the north is not fully understood due to leveling, but is estimated to be the same size and structure as the building on the south side. The compound was surrounded by stone ramparts on the south and west sides, and a stone wall on the east side to a height of approximately one meter above the flat surface survives. Within the compound, there are 100 pagodas made of piled up pebbles the size of a human head, measuring 2.4 meters on a side and estimated to be 0.6 meters high, neatly arranged in ten rows on each side from east-to-west and north-to-south, at 2.4 meter intervals. However, only 98 of these remain today.

Excavated remains include Haji ware pottery, a large number of roof tiles, and carved stone fragments; the pottery dates from the early 9th century to the 10th century. The roof tiles include a round roof tile with a nine-petal lotus motif and a flat roof tile with arabesque motif, both from the early 9th century.

== See also ==
- List of Historic Sites of Japan (Kumamoto)
