= Nozu Kofun Cluster =

Kofun burial mound in Japan

Nozu Kofun cluster
- 野津古墳群 (Japanese)
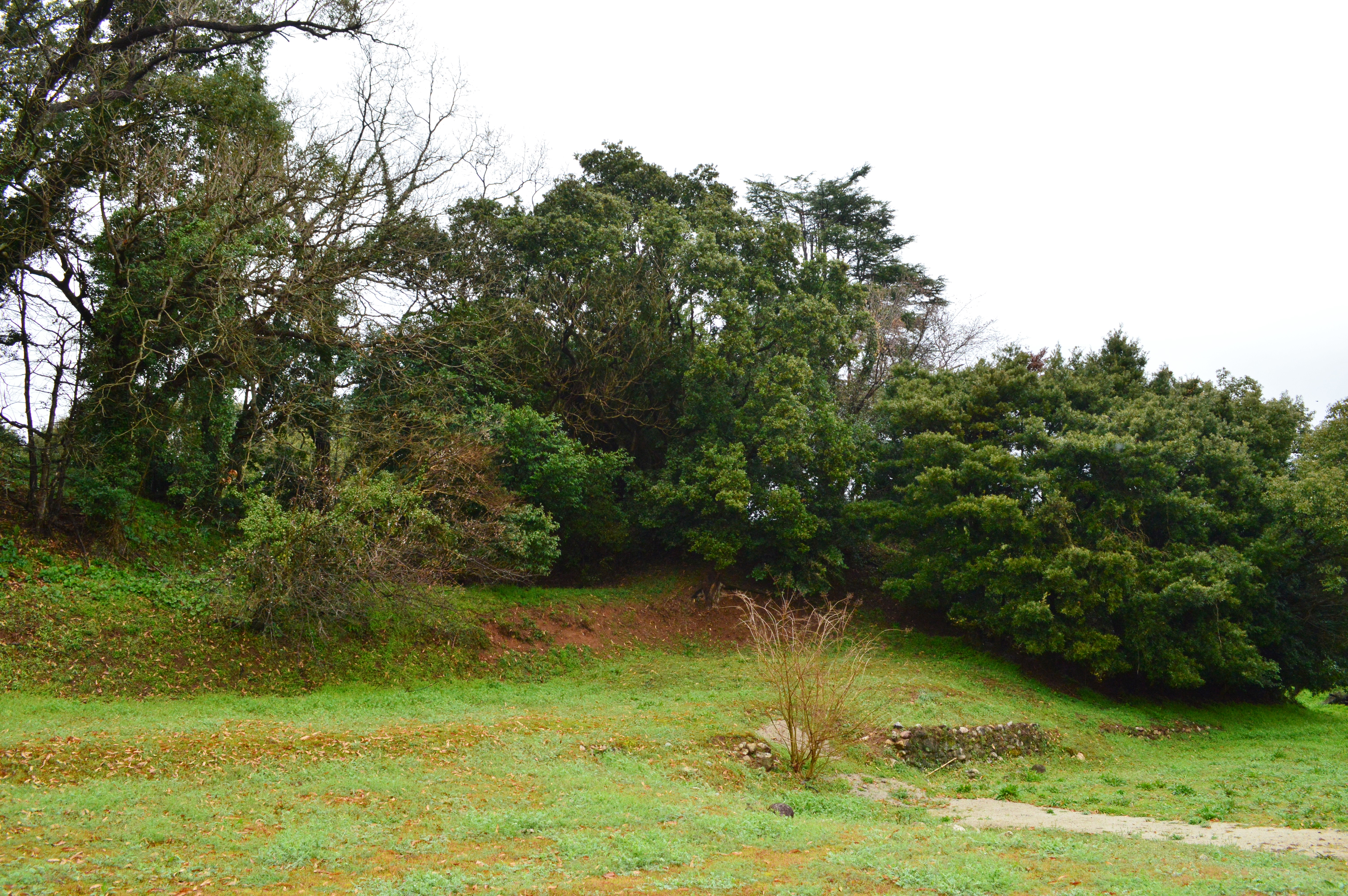
- Hime-no-jō Kofun

- Nozu Kofun cluster Nozu Kofun Cluster (Japan)
- Interactive map of Nozu Kofun cluster
- 32°33′37.77″N 130°41′35.41″E
- Type: kofun
- Periods: Kofun period
- Location: Hikawa, Kumamoto, Japan
- Region: Kyushu

History
- Built: 6th century AD

Site notes
- Public access: Yes (no facilities)

The Nozu Kofun (野津古墳群, Nozu Kofun gun) is a group of Kofun period burial mounds located in the Ryūhoku neighborhood of the town of Hikawa, Kumamoto Prefecture, Japan. The site was designated a National Historic Site of Japan in 2005. Furthermore, the Ōno-no-Iwa Kofun, the largest kofun in Kumamoto Prefecture is located on the same hill to the north.

== Overview ==
The Nozu Kofun cluster is located on a hill at an elevation of 90 to 100 meters overlooking the plains of the Hikawa River basin and the Yatsushiro Sea on the western foot of the Kyushu Mountains in central Kumamoto Prefecture. It is composed of five zenpō-kōen-fun (前方後円墳), which is shaped like a keyhole, having one square end and one circular end, when viewed from above, of which four are currently extant. Several boat-shaped and box-shaped sarcophagi have also been found in the surrounding area.Excavations have been carried out since 1993.

=== Monomi Yagura Kofun ===
The Monomi Yagura Kofun (物見櫓古墳) is the westernmost in the group, and is believed to have been the first built. It has a length of 62 meters, making it also the smallest in the group. The mound is constructed in three tiers and is orientated to the southwest. Fukiishi have been found on the outside of the mound, but there is no trace of haniwa, or of a surrounding moat. The multi-chamber horizontal-entry burial chamber has a length of 11 meters. The Monomi-Yagura Tomb is estimated to have been built in the early 6th century. Despite having been looted in antiquity, surviving grave goods include iron arrowheads and iron spears, fragments of armor, glass beads, earrings with pendants, as well as ceramic pottery and Sue ware pottery. Among these items the gold earrings with pendants and the ceramic pottery are noteworthy as indications of exchanges with the Korean Peninsula, and have been designated as Tangible Cultural Properties of Hikawa Town.

=== Hime-no-jō Kofun ===
The Hime-no-jō Kofun (姫ノ城古墳) is the northernmost in the group, and is believed to have been the second built. It has a length of 86 meters, and is surrounded by a moat, giving it a total overall length of 115 meters. The mound is orientated to the south-southwest and has both fukiishi and haniwa. In addition, stone ornaments (two quivers, six lid caps, three lid supports, seven stone shields, etc.) have been found on the outside of the mound, which is the second largest concentration in any kofun after the Iwatoyama Kofun in Fukuoka Prefecture. These items have been designated Important Cultural Properties of Kumamoto Prefecture. Details of the burial chamber are not clear, as it has not been excavated, but Ground-penetrating radar surveys indicate a horizontal-entry stone chamber. It is estimated to have been built in the early 6th century.

=== Naka-no-jō Kofun ===
The Naka-no-jō Kofun (中ノ城古墳) is the central tumulus in the group, and is believed to have been the third built. It has a length of 102 meters, making it the largest in the group. The mound is orientated to the south-southwest and has both fukiishi and haniwa, as well as stone ornaments. The tumulus is surrounded by a moat, giving it a total overall length of 117 meters. The burial facility is a horizontal-entry stone chamber, and was robbed in the Meiji period. Surviving grave goods found include armor, iron swords, horse equipment, and glass beads, which date the construction to the early 6th century during the late Kofun period. The excavated items have been designated as Tangible Cultural Properties by Hikawa Town, and some of these items are stored at the Tokyo National Museum. The tumulus was used as a air raid shelter in World War II.

=== Hashi-no-jō Kofun ===
The Hashi-no-jō Kofun (端ノ城古墳) is the southernmost in the group, and is believed to have been the last built. It has a length of 68 meters, or a total length overall length including the surrounding moat of about 800 meters The mound is constructed in three tiers and is orientated to the south. Fukiishi and figurative haniwa have been found on the out of the mound. The burial facility is a horizontal entry stone chamber containing a stone sarcophagus. Despite having been looted, surviving grave goods include iron arrowheads, armor, Chinese scepters, horse fittings, glass magatama, jasper tubular beads, and Sue ware pottery. From these items, the tumulus estimated to have been built in the early to mid-6th century during the late Kofun period.

=== Amazutsu Kofun ===
The Amazutsu Kofun (天堤古墳) was the fifth tumulus in the cluster. It was bulldozed in 1962 to create an orchard. Stone ornaments were recovered from the site.

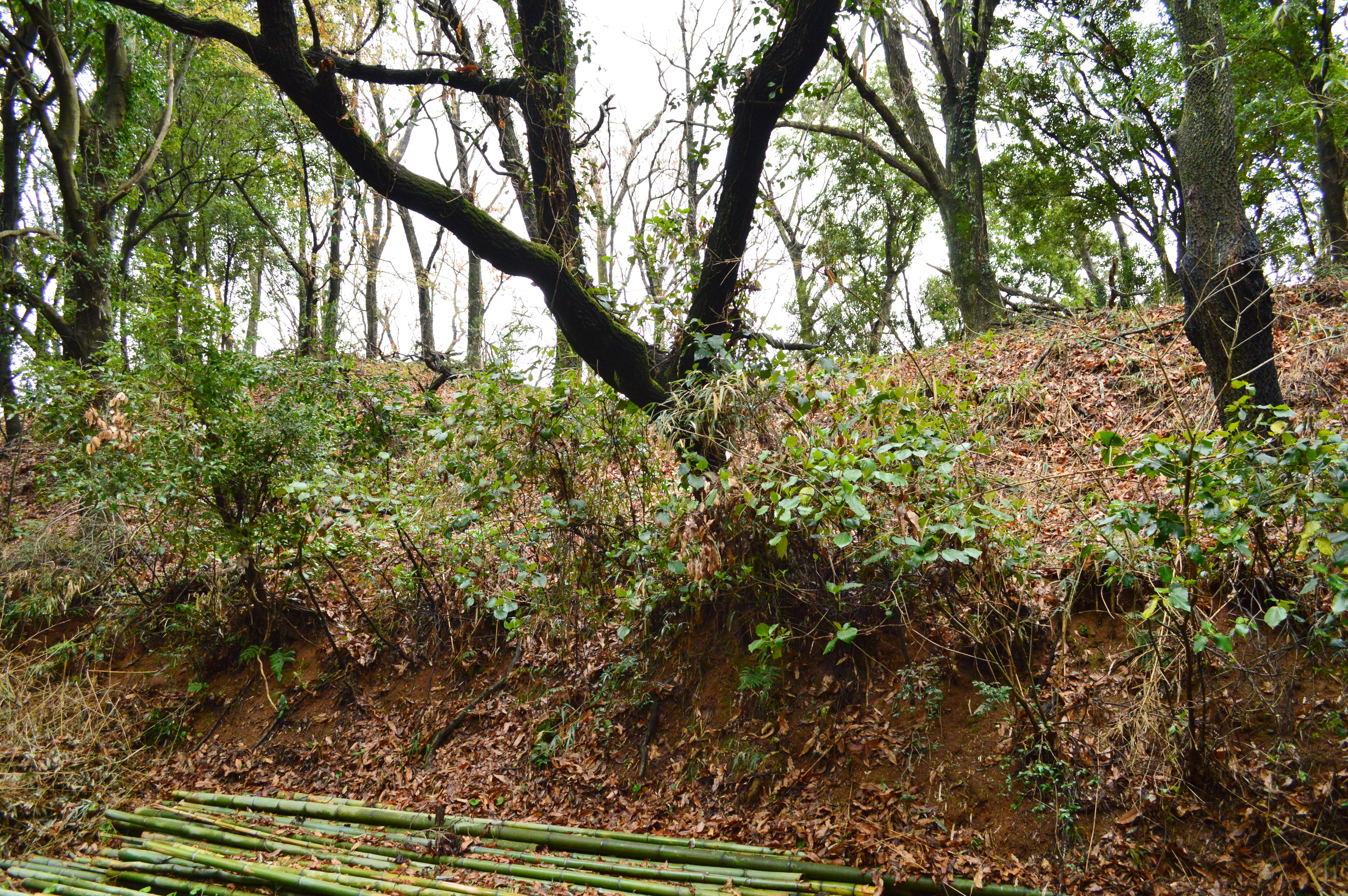
Monomiyagura Kofun

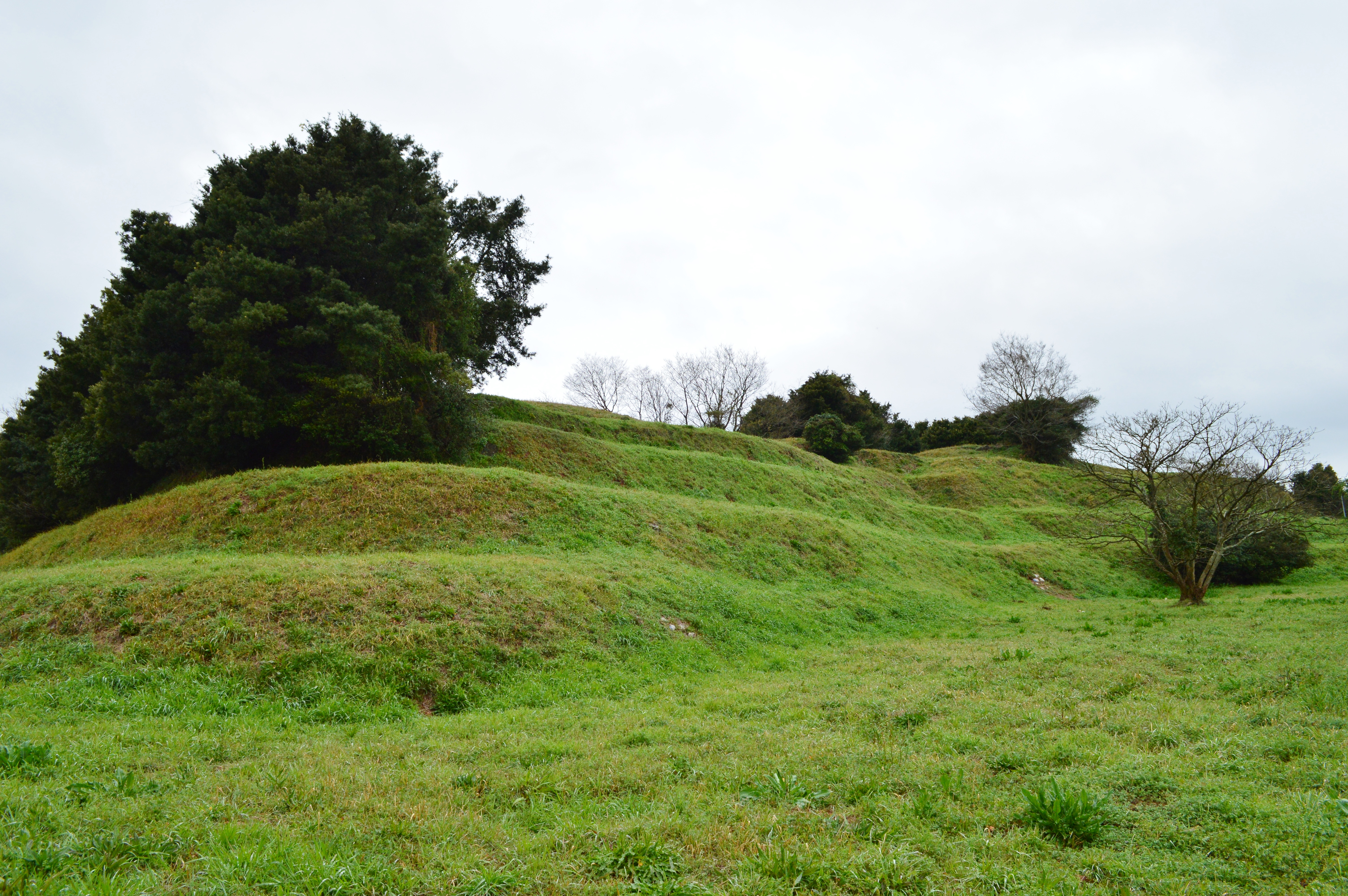
Naka-no-jō Kofun

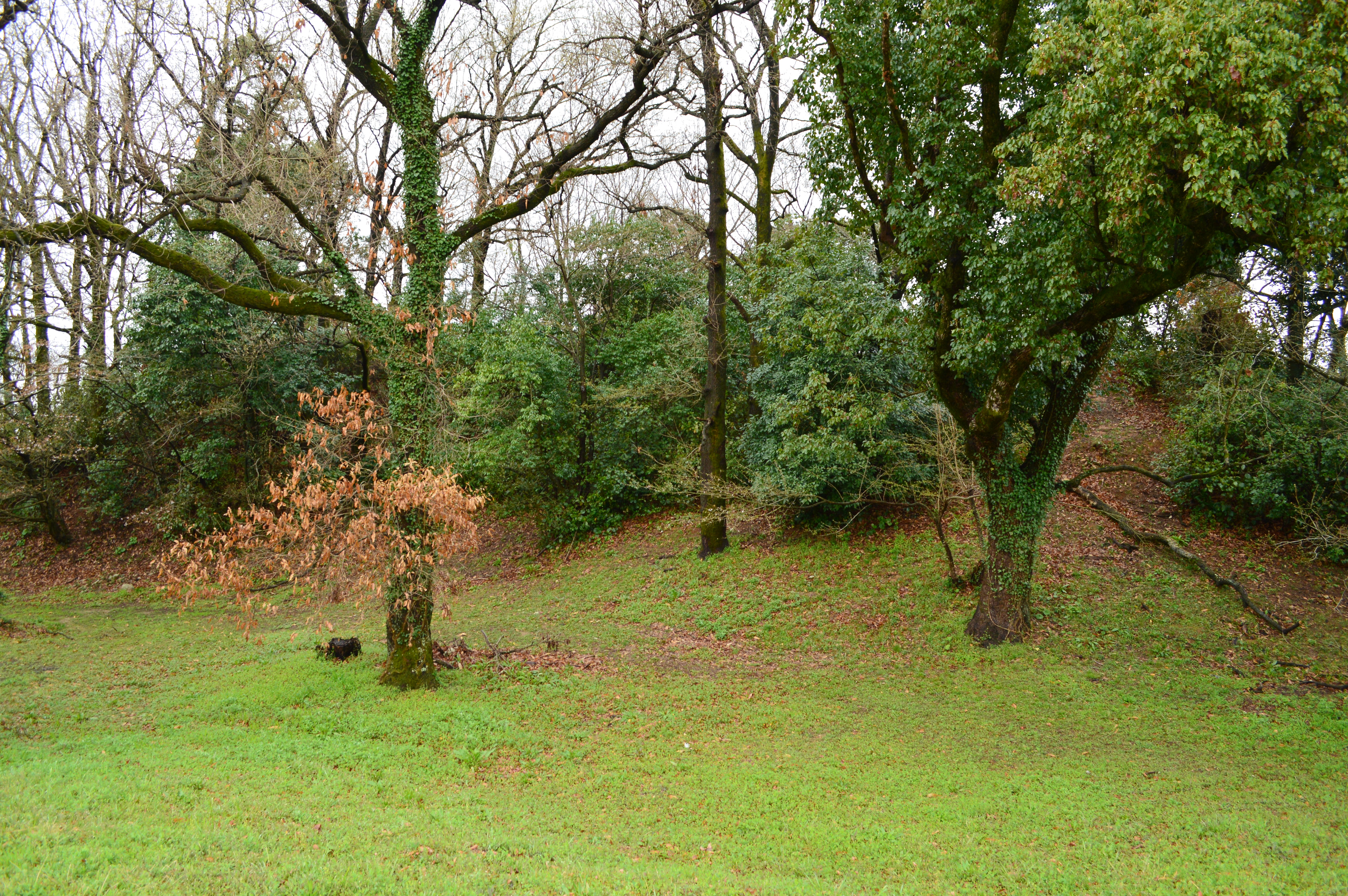
Hashi-no-jō Kofun

The site is about 4.3 kilometers east of Arisa Station on the JR Kyushu Kagoshima Main Line.

== See also ==
- List of Historic Sites of Japan (Kumamoto)
