= Futagoyama Stone Tool Production Site =

Archaeological site in Japan

- 二子山石器製作遺跡 (Japanese)
- Futagoyama Stone Tool Production Site Futagoyama Stone Tool Production Site (Japan)
- 32°54′23″N 130°44′31″E
- Periods: Jōmon period
- Location: Kōshi, Kumamoto, Japan
- Region: Kyushu

Site notes
- Public access: Yes (no facilities)
- National Historic Site of Japan

The Futagoyama Stone Tool Production Site (二子山石器製作遺跡, Futagoyama sekki-seisaku iseki) is an archaeological site with the traces of a late Jōmon period stone tool production site, located in the Nonoshima neighborhood of the town of Kōshi, Kumamoto Prefecture Japan. It was designated a National Historic Site of Japan in 1972.

== Overview ==
The Futagoyama Stone Tool Production Site is located on a small hill 87 meters above sea level, shaped like a camel's back, formed by the Koshi River, a tributary of the Kikuchi River that flows west of Mount Aso. This hill is called "Futagoyama" and has an elevation relative to the surrounding farmland of about 15 meters, and contains two kofun burial mounds. When these kofun were investigated by archaeologists in 1930, the traces of a workshop and stone quarry where stone tools were manufactured from the late to final Jomon period was discovered. The site was re-excavated in 1964 and four times from 1965 to 1970. The remains extend over an area of about 170 meters from east-to-west and about 130 meters from north-to-south. Many lithic cores and lithic flakes were discovered in the surrounding area, mainly around exposed basaltic andesite, along with shards of Jōmon pottery. Most of the stone tools are flat hammered stone axes, and cruciform stone tools . Stone axes produced at this site have been found in more than 55 archaeological sites distributed from Shirakawa in the south to Kikuchi River in the north.

The site is located approximately 9.6 kilometers north-northwest of Musashizuka Station in the JR Kyushu Hōhi Main Line.

== See also ==
- List of Historic Sites of Japan (Kumamoto)
