= Kamao Kofun =

- 釜尾古墳 (Japanese)
- Kamao Kofun Kamao Kofun (Japan)
- Interactive map of Kamao Kofun
- 32°50′20.45″N 130°41′47.89″E
- Type: Kofun
- Periods: Kofun period
- Location: Kumamoto, Kumamoto, Japan
- Region: Kyushu

History
- Built: c.6th century

Site notes
- Public access: Yes (no facilities)

Kamao Kofun (釜尾古墳) is a Kofun period burial mound, located in the Kamao neighborhood of the city of Kumamoto, Kumamoto Prefecture, Japan. The tumulus was designated a National Historic Site of Japan in 1921 with the area under protection expanded in 2022.

== Overview ==
The Kamao Kofun is an enpun (円墳)-style circular tumulus, located at an elevation of about 50 meters on the Kamao Hills on the right bank of the Iseri River in the northwest part of the city. It is known to have been an ancient burial mound since at least the mid-Edo Period as it appears in historical records dated 1769. When the Kamao Tenjin Shrine was constructed to the immediate west of the tumulus, the western half of the mound was destroyed. Although the mound has been deformed, it is estimated to be 18 meters in diameter and 6 meters in height. A surrounding moat with an inner diameter of 28–29 meters and a width of 3–4 meters was discovered in 1990. The interior contains a horizontal-entry stone burial chamber made of andesite, with a double-sided entrance gate opening to the south. The total length is about 9.6 meters, with the burial chamber measuring 3.6 meters long, 3.6 meters wide and 3 meters high. The entrance passage is 6 meters long and one meter wide, but only 0.7 meters high. The antechamber is 1.75 by 0.9 meters, and 1.5 meters high. It is a decorated kofun. The side walls of the chamber are made of broken stones, the lower part of which is painted red at a height of about 1.8 meters, and the upper part painted white. The decorative designs are painted in red, blue and white on the pillars and capstone of the entrance gate that make up the front wall, with concentric circles, triangles, double-row triangles and double-legged rings. Grave goods included iron products, Sue ware pottery, tubular beads, swords, knives, armor and horse equipment. Based on the structure of the stone chamber and the murals, it is estimated to have been built in the late 6th century.

The tumulus is about five minutes from Sōjōdaigakumae Station on the JR Kyushu Kagoshima Main Line.

== See also ==
- List of Historic Sites of Japan (Kumamoto)
- Decorated kofun
