= Segonkō Kofun =

- 千金甲古墳 (Japanese)
- Segonkō Kofun Segonkō Kofun (Japan)
- Interactive map of Segonkō Kofun
- 32°47′04″N 130°37′51″E
- Type: Kofun
- Periods: Kofun period
- Location: Kumamoto, Kumamoto, Japan
- Region: Kyushu

History
- Built: c.6th century

Site notes
- Public access: Yes (no facilities)

Segonkō Kofun (千金甲古墳) are two Kofun period decorated kofun burial mounds, located in the Kojima Shitamachi neighborhood of the city of Kumamoto, Kumamoto Prefecture Japan. The tumuli were separately designated a National Historic Site of Japan in 1921.

== Overview ==
The Segonkō Kofun (A) (千金甲古墳 (乙号), Segonkō kofun (otsugō)) is located at the western edge of the Kumamoto Plain, south of the Gongenyama Hills that extend south from Mount Kinpu, at the saddle between Mt. Takagi and the south of the Gongenyama Hills, at an elevation of about 60 meters. The mouths of the Tsuboi River and Shirakawa River can be seen below. It is a enpun (円墳)-style circular end circular tumulus with a 2.6 meter horizontal entry passageway. The stone burial chamber is 3.6 by 3 meters wide, and although the height is unclear as the ceiling was opened early, it is estimated to have been over 4 meters. The burial chamber is made of broken andesite stones stacked flat, and at the back there is a huge stone sarcophagus. The sarcophagus is 1.17 meters high, with an inner width of 1.75 meters and depth of 1 meters. The inside is painted with triple concentric circles as well as bows, quivers, boats, swords, and other designs, and is painted red and green. It is estimated to have been built in the mid-6th century. The tumulus was covered by a roof in 1960 (Showa 35) to protect the interior.

The Segonkō Kofun (B) (千金甲古墳 (甲号), Segonkō kofun (kōgō)) is located at a higher elevation of 110 meters on the southern slope of the Gongenyama Hills on the western edge of Kumamoto City. The surrounding area is home to several other kofun clusters, including the Terayashiki kofun cluster, Gongendaira kofun cluster, Narazakiyama kofun cluster, and Takajoyama kofun cluster, and this is the highest of the five kofun in the Segonkō kofun cluster. The mound was carved into a semi-circular ditch along the slightly gentle slope of the mountain (northwest slope), and the soil was then piled up. It is a circular tomb orientated to the southwest. Although the entrance passage is buried, it is about 3 meters long. The stone burial chamber is made of broken andesite stones laid flat, measuring 2.5 by 2.7 meters. The interior of the burial chamber is surrounded by a stone barrier made of six tuff slabs, the inner walls of which are engraved with concentric circles, diagonal lines and quiver patterns, and are painted in three colors: red, blue and yellow. The tomb as robbed in ancient times, and no grave goods remain, but it is estimated to have been built around the beginning of the 6th century.

The tumuli are about 6.8 kilometers east from Kumamoto Station on the JR Kyushu Kyushu Shinkansen.

== See also ==
- List of Historic Sites of Japan (Kumamoto)
- Decorated kofun
