= Ōno-no-Iwa Kofun =

Kofun period keyhole-shaped burial mound in Japan

Ōno-no-Iwaya Kofun
- 大野窟古墳 (Japanese)
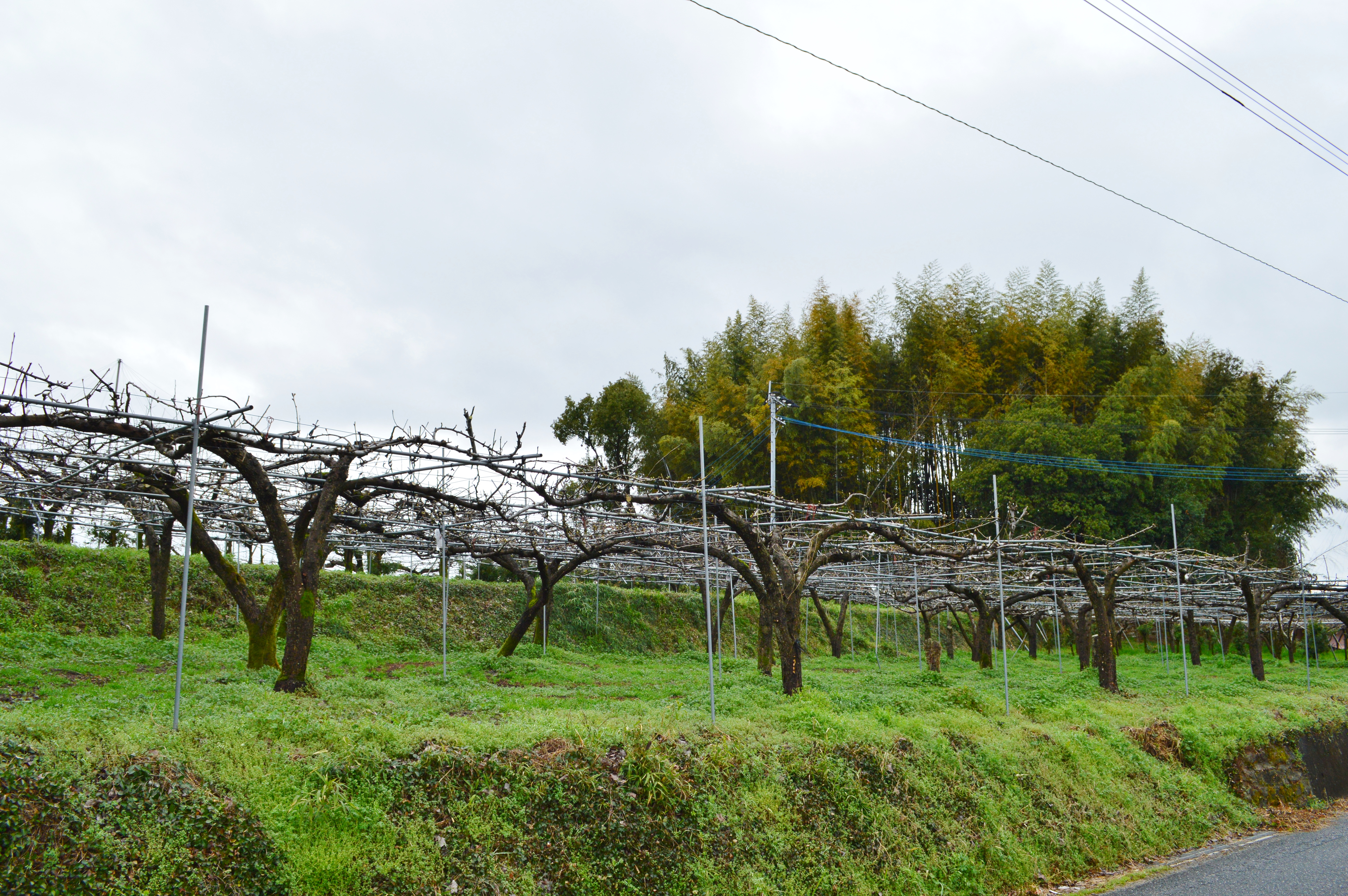
- Ōno-no-Iwaya Kofun (The front part is on the left, and the rear mound is on the right.)

- Ōno-no-Iwaya Kofun Ōno-no-Iwa Kofun (Japan)
- Interactive map of Ōno-no-Iwaya Kofun
- 32°34′20.3″N 130°42′6.77″E
- Type: Kofun
- Periods: Kofun period
- Location: Hikawa, Kumamoto, Japan
- Region: Kyushu

History
- Built: c.6th century

Site notes
- Public access: Yes (no facilities)

Ōno-no-Iwaya Kofun (大野窟古墳) is a Kofun period keyhole-shaped burial mound, located in the Ryūhoku neighborhood of the town of Hikawa, Kumamoto Prefecture, Japan. The tumulus was designated a National Historic Site of Japan in 2013. It is the largest kofun in Kumamoto Prefecture, and is estimated to have been built in the mid-to-late 6th century (late Kofun period).

== Overview ==
The Ōno-no-Iwaya Kofun is a zenpō-kōen-fun (前方後円墳), which is shaped like a keyhole, having one square end and one circular end, when viewed from above. It is located on the Onohara Plateau in central Kumamoto Prefecture. The area is known as a site for many ancient burial mounds,including the Nozu Kofun Cluster located to the south, which has a separate National Historic Site designation. The existence of the tumulus has been known since the Muromachi period, and on the wall of its passageway is an inscription dated 1497 indicating that a statue of Amida Nyorai was enshrined within; however, the tumulus was not excavated until 2003 to 2008.

The tomb is a "kenbishi"-type keyhole-shaped tomb with a protruding front end orientated to the south. The mound is built in two stages and has a total length of 122.8 meters, making it the largest in Kumamoto Prefecture. It is surrounded by a shield-shaped moat (excluding the front of the anterior part), measuring approximately 12 meters wide. The anterior part of the mound has an unusual style in which a row of earth pits (possibly related to rituals) replace the moat. The burial facility is a double-sided horizontal-entry stone burial chamber with a house-shaped stone sarcophagus, opening to the southwest. A 1.9-meter-wide stone shelf is installed on top of the sarcophagus, and two tuff mortuary beds are installed on each side near the entrance burial chamber is 6.5 meters high, making it the largest in Japan in terms of height. The sarcophagus is made of tuff from Mount Aso. No excavation has been conducted inside the burial chamber proper, so any grave goods are unclear, but excavated items include Sue ware and Silla-style pottery from the moat pit], and a hat-shaped stone ornament from the mound proper.

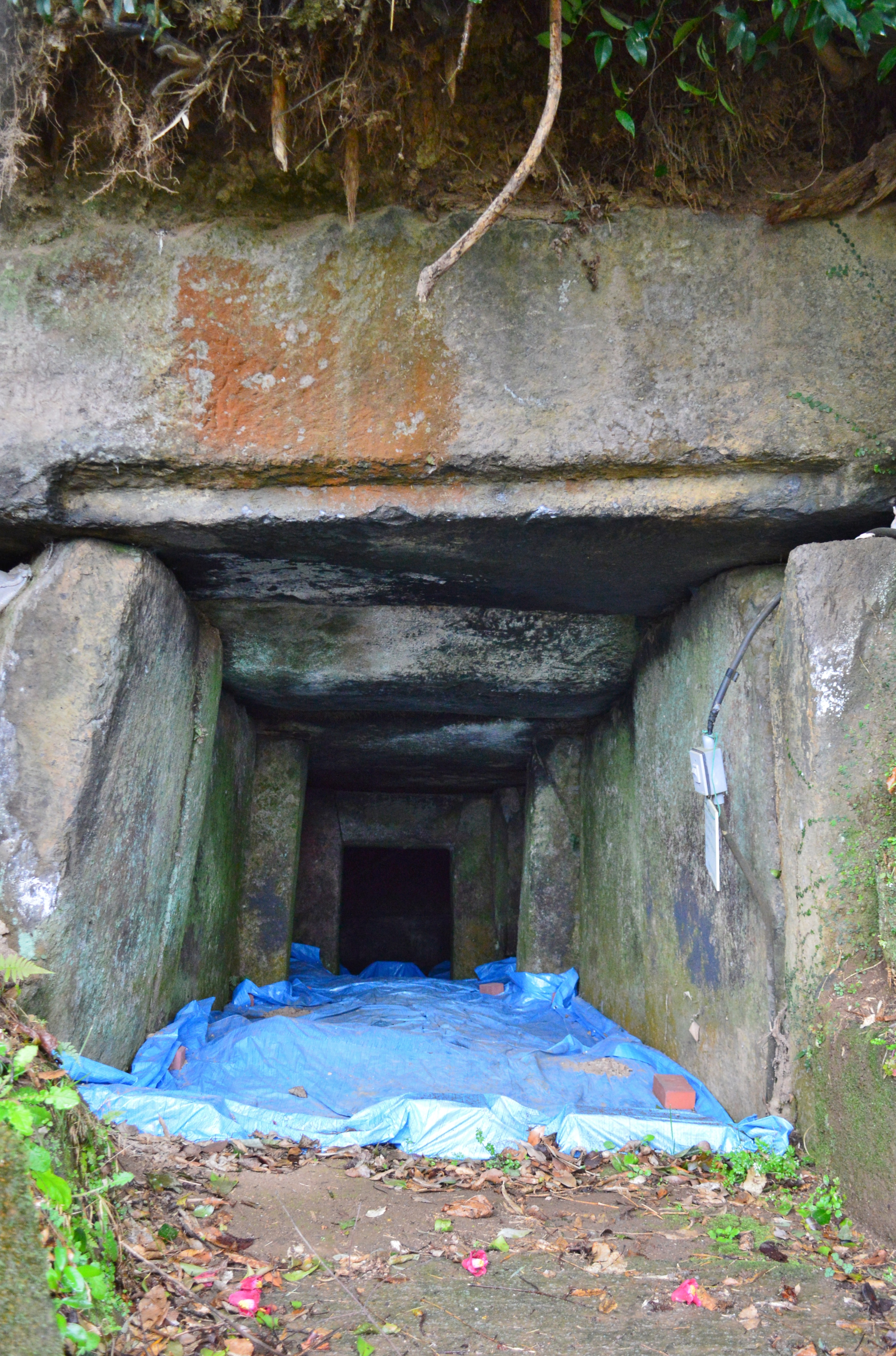
Entry to the burial chamber

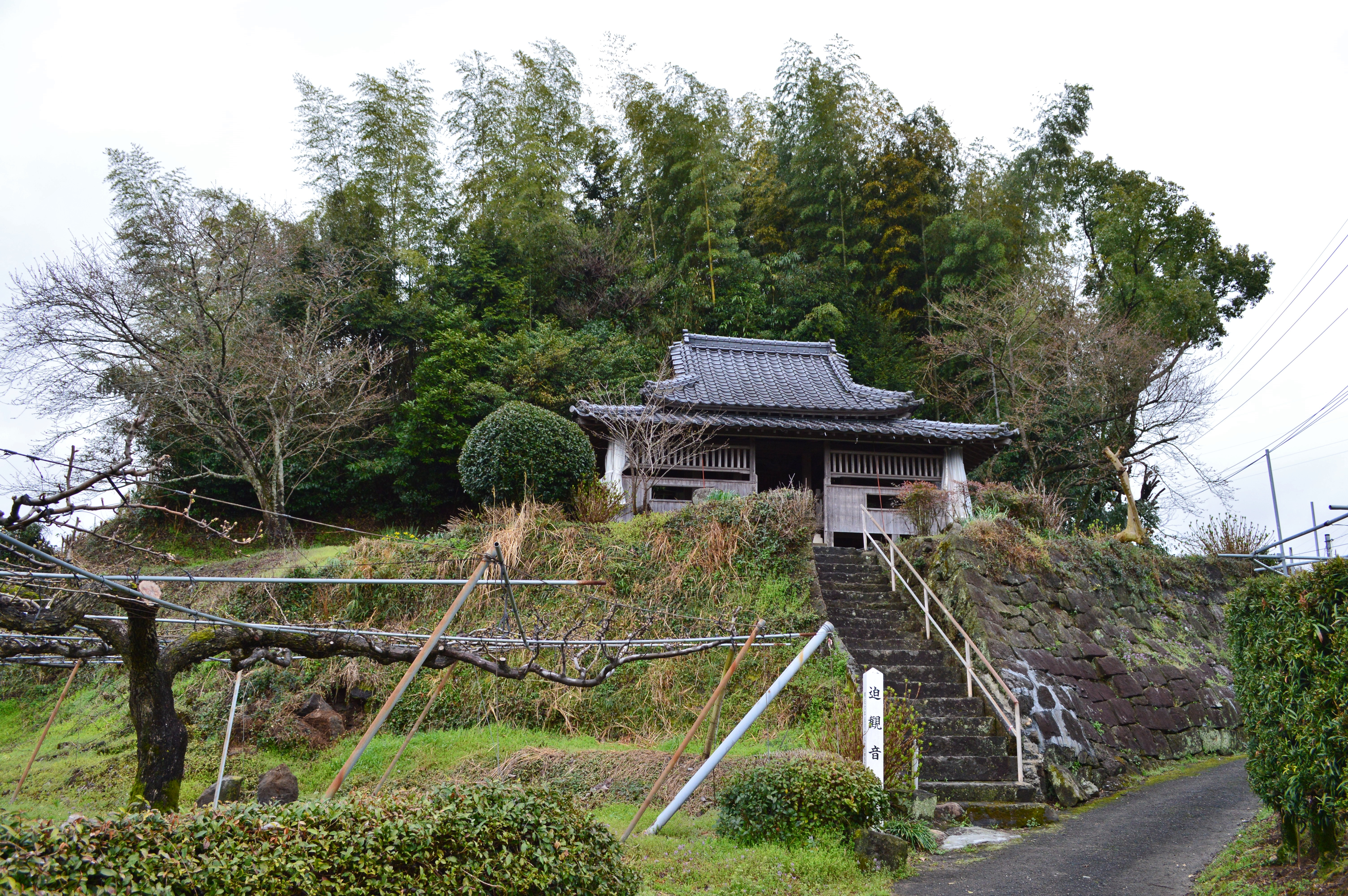
Posterior circular portion now crowned with a Buddhist chapel

The tumulus is about four kilometers southeast of Ogawa Station on the JR Kyushu Kagoshima Main Line.

== See also ==
- List of Historic Sites of Japan (Kumamoto)
