= Sashiki Castle (Higo) =

Castle ruins in Ashikita, Kumamoto, Japan

- 佐敷城
- Ashikita, Kumamoto Japan

Site information
- Type: Japanese castle
- Controlled by: Kato clan
- Open to the public: yes
- Condition: Archaeological and designated national historical site; castle ruins

Location
- Coordinates: 32°18′11.0″N 130°30′10.0″E

Site history
- Built: Sengoku period
- National Historic Site of Japan

Sashiki Castle (佐敷城, Sashiki-jō) was a Sengoku period yamajiro-style Japanese castle located in the town of Ashikita, Kumamoto Prefecture, Japan. Its ruins have been protected as a National Historic Site since 2008. It is also referred to as Sashiki Hanaoka Castle (佐敷花岡城, Sashiki Hanaoka-jō).

== Overview ==
Sashiki Castle is located on Shiroyama, a 90-meter hill in the Sashiki neighborhood of Ashikita, at the mouth of the Sashiki River. The location is a strategic intersection of the Satsuma Kaido and the Hitoyoshi Kaigo, commanding land transportation to southern Kyushu and the isolated Hitoyoshi Basin in southern Higo Province, and the site of a port which was used in the Sengoku period Nanban trade.The castle was shaped like an arrowhead facing south. The central enclosure was a trapezoid-shaped area at the highest point of the hill, and secondary exclosure spread along the ridge toward south. Gates of central and secondary enclosures were narrow, and in case of emergency could be filled by sand to shut them. The stone walls of these areas were high, but complexly folded to erase any dead angles and enable defenders to shoot the enemy from the side. In the Edo Period reconstruction, tall stone walls were added to the north side of the central enclosure. This area had originally been protected by sheer slopes of the hill, but the construction of walls and yagura turrets was also intended as a show of authority over the castle town which spread northward from the castle.

== History ==
Sashiki Castle has appeared in historical documents since the Nanboku-chō period as the stronghold of the local Sashiki clan, but the prevailing theory is that the castle was not located at the present-day Sashiki Castle site, but to the east. The Nanboku-chō Sashiki Castle was repeatedly fought over by the Nawa clan, based in Yatsushiro, and the Sagara clan, whose power had expanded from Hitoyoshi, but in 1459, the shugo of Higo Province, Kikuchi Tamekuni officially recognized the Sagara clan's claims over the Ashikita area. In 1581, Shimazu Yoshihisa defeated Sagara Yoshiharu in Minamata, conquered Ashikita, placing his vassal Miyahara Kagetane in control of Sashiki Castle. The Shimazu clan then annexed Yatsushiro, and thereafter actively conquered various parts of central and northern Kyushu, but in 1587, they were forced to abandon their castles in Higo and retreat after Toyotomi Hideyoshi's Kyūshū campaign. In 1588, Ashikita became an exclave of Kato Kiyomasa, who was bestowed half of the northern part of Higo following Sassa Narimasa's disastrous and short-lived tenure. Kato Kiyomasa built the early modern Sashiki Castle, surrounded by stone walls on Mount Hanaoka, and appointed Kato Shigetsugu as castellan. In June 1592, Umekita Kunikane, a vassal of Shimazu Toshihisa, took advantage of the fact that Kato Shigetsugu was away fighting as part of the Japanese expeditionary force in the Japanese invasions of Korea (1592–1598), and occupied Sashiki Castle, but with the help of the castellan, Inoue Yoshihiro and others, Umekita Kunikane was killed and Sashiki Castle was recaptured.After returning from Korea, the Kato clan continued to build Sashiki Castle as a check against the Shimazu clan, but in 1600, during the Battle of Sekigahara, Ashikita was isolated between the pro-Tokugawa Konishi clan and the Shimazu clan. Shimazu Tadanaga laid siege to the castle, which was defended by Kato Shigetsugu for over a month until the news of the defeat of the Western Army at Sekigahara reached him and the Shimazu army withdrew its troops. The expansion and renovation of Sashiki Castle continued after that, but in 1615, under the "One Castle per Province Act" proclaimed by the Tokugawa shogunate, Sashiki Castle was abandoned with its stone walls demolished. The tenshu was moved to Kumamoto Castle.

== Current situation ==
Part of the stone walls were discovered in 1979, and archaeological excavations were conducted from 1993 to 2001. A proposal was made to develop a park that would recreate the three-story tenshu depicted in a Sengoku period map of Higo Province, but the foundation stones of the tenshu were not found during excavation. A candidate opposed to rebuilding the tenshu was elected in the mayoral election, so in 1997, the restoration of the stone walls was the focus of the development of the historical park. In March 1998, the castle was designated as a historic site by Kumamoto Prefecture, and a tile with the words "Peace under the world, peace on the land" carved on it, which was excavated from the castle ruins, was also designated an Prefectural Important Cultural Property at the same time. In April of the same year, it was opened to the public as "Sashiki Castle Ruins Shiroyama Park".

The castle site is a 20-minute walk from Sashiki Station on the Hisatsu Orange Railway Line.

== See also ==
- List of Historic Sites of Japan (Kumamoto)

== Literature ==
- Benesch, Oleg and Ran Zwigenberg (2019). Japan's Castles: Citadels of Modernity in War and Peace. Cambridge: Cambridge University Press. p. 374. ISBN 9781108481946.
- De Lange, William (2021). An Encyclopedia of Japanese Castles. Groningen: Toyo Press. pp. 600 pages. ISBN 978-9492722300.
