= Tsukawara Kofun Cluster =

Kofun period keyhole-shaped burial mound in Japan

- 塚原古墳群 (Japanese)
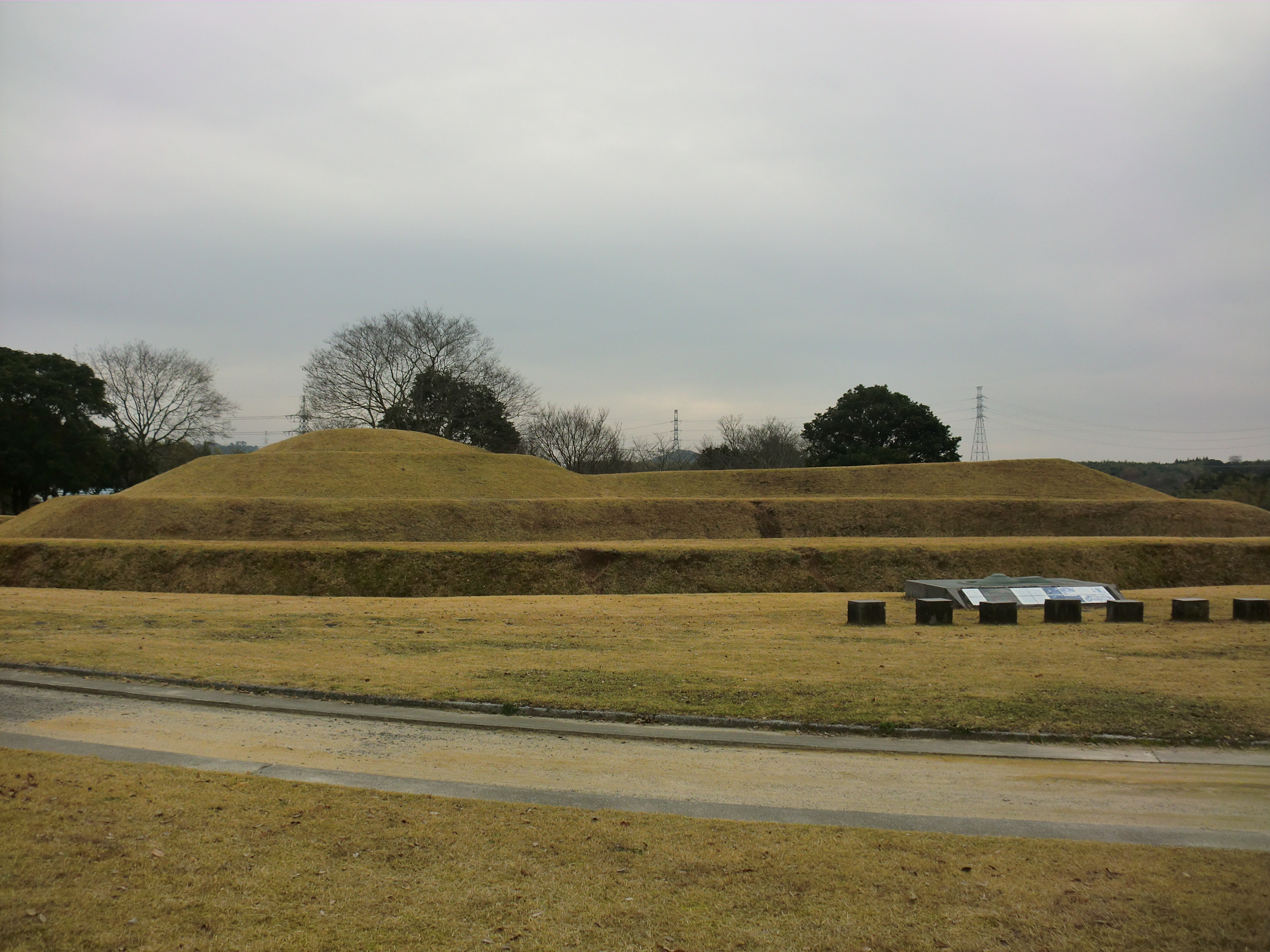
- zenpō-kōen-fun at Tsukawara Kofun Cluster

- Tsukawara Kofun Clsuter Tsukawara Kofun Cluster (Japan)
- Interactive map of Tsukawara Kofun Cluster
- 32°41′23″N 130°44′13″E
- Type: Kofun
- Periods: Kofun period
- Location: Minami-ku, Kumamoto, Japan
- Region: Kyushu

History
- Built: c.4th-6th century

Site notes
- Public access: Yes (park, museum)

Tsukawara Kofun Cluster (塚原古墳群, Tsukawara Kofun gun) is a group of Kofun period burial mounds, located in the Jonan neighborhood of Minami-ku in the city of Kumamoto, Japan. The tumulus cluster was designated a National Historic Site of Japan in 1976.

== Overview ==
The Tsukawara Kofun cluster was discovered in 1972 during the construction of the Kyushu Expressway, and for preservation purposes, the route of the expressway was changed to a tunnel which passes directly underneath the site. The site was preserved as Tsukahara Kofun Park, and also contains the Kumamoto City Tsukahara History and Folklore Museum. This group of burial mounds is the largest in Kumamoto Prefecture and one of the largest in Japan, and was constructed in the 4th to 6th centuries. The park contains 39 hōfun (方墳) square moated tumuli, 34 enpun (円墳) circular tumuli, and three zenpō-kōen-fun (前方後円墳) keyhole-shaped tombs, with one square end and one circular end, when viewed from above, along with 18 stone sarcophagi, and one stone-covered earthen mound; however, only the area immediately above the route of the Kyushu Expressway has been investigated and preserved. Of the two hills in the park, north and south, the large square moat tombs are mainly concentrated south of the northern hill, while the large circular tombs are concentrated around the northern hill and south of the southern hill. It is believed that there are many more such burial mounds outside the park, and in an exploratory survey of the entire Tsukahara Plateau in 1973, and additional 203 burial mounds were confirmed, and it was estimated that in the surrounding area there may be nearly 500 burial mounds in total.

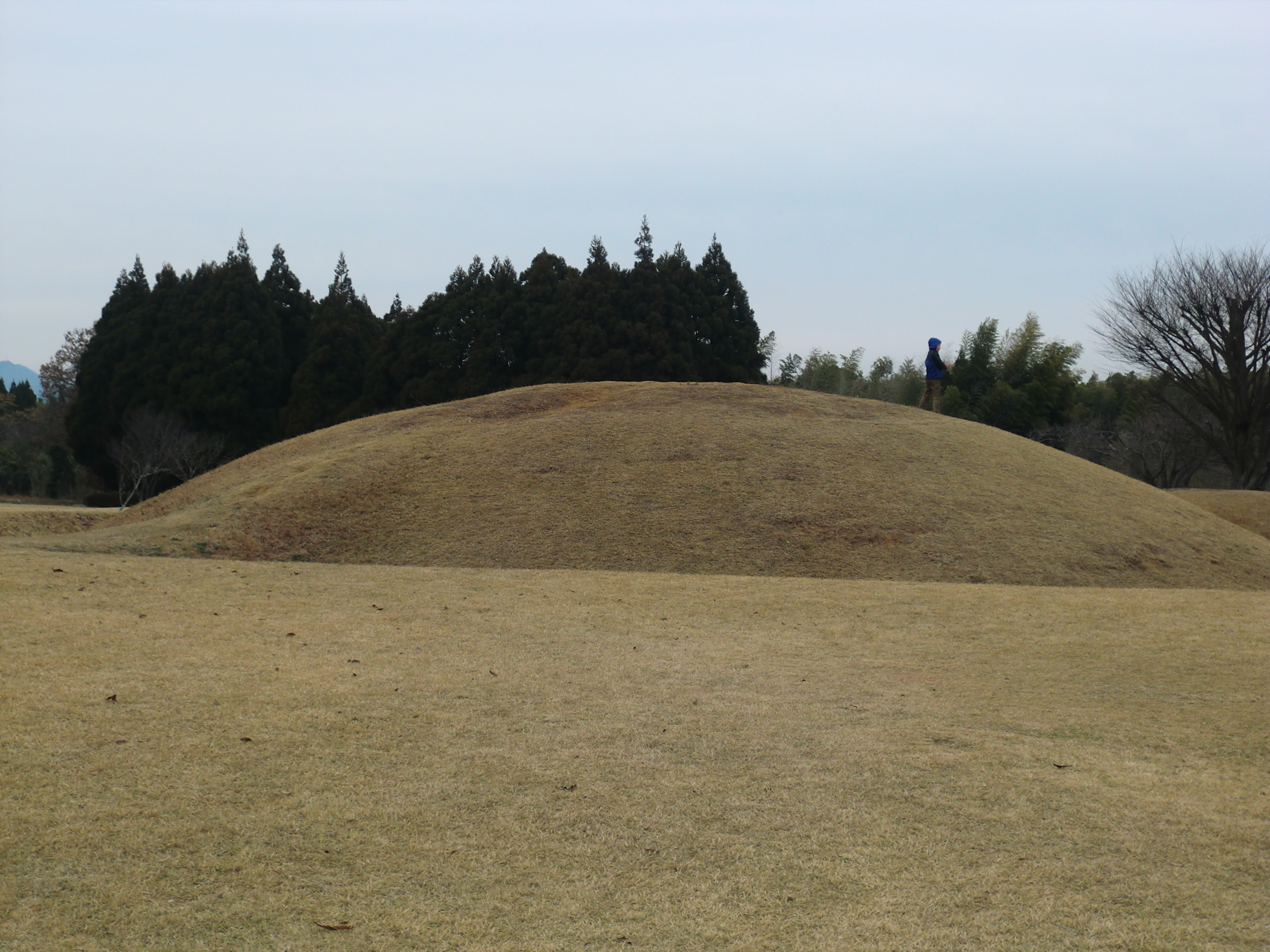
enpun-style round kofun

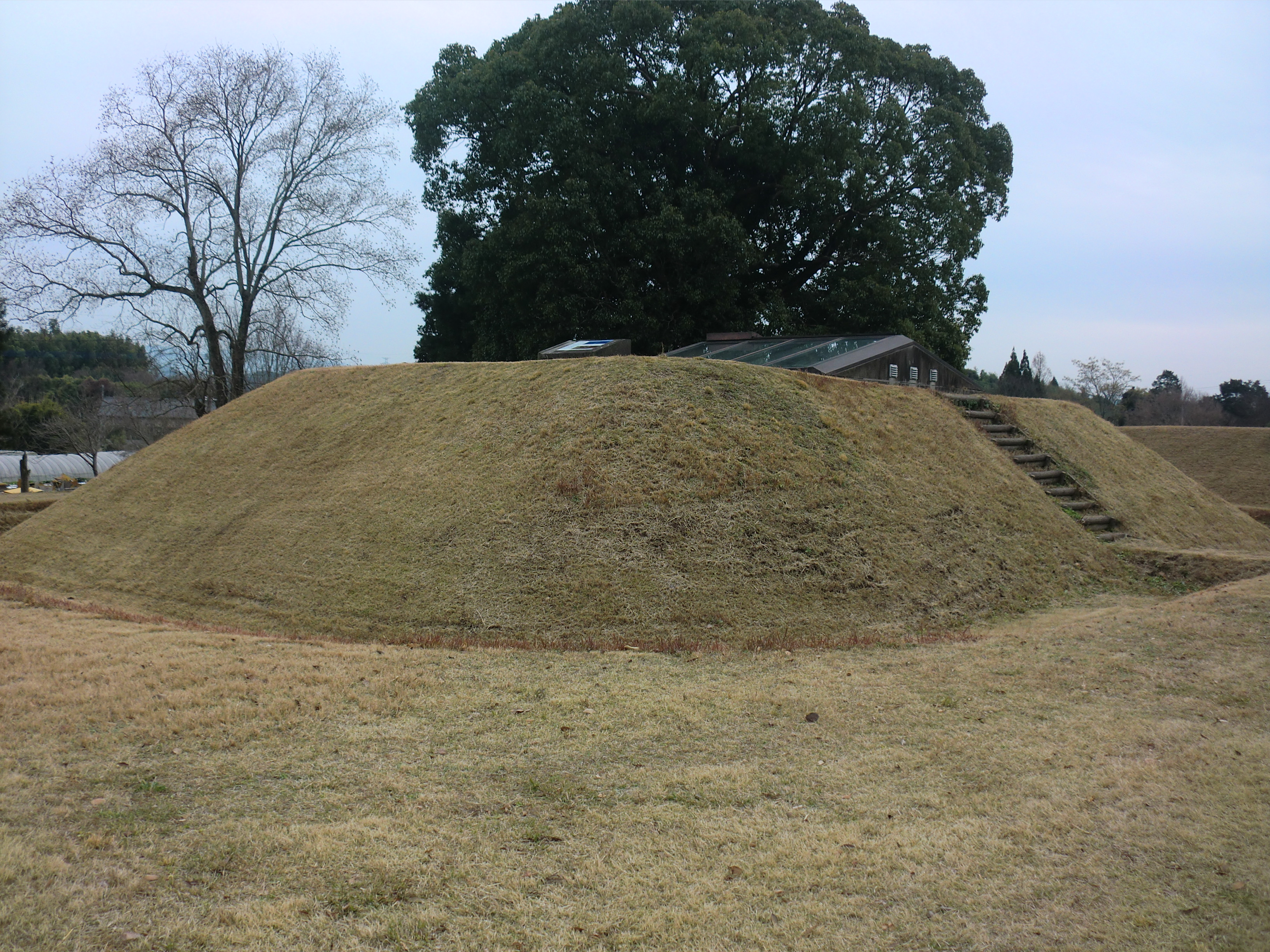
hōfun-style square kofun

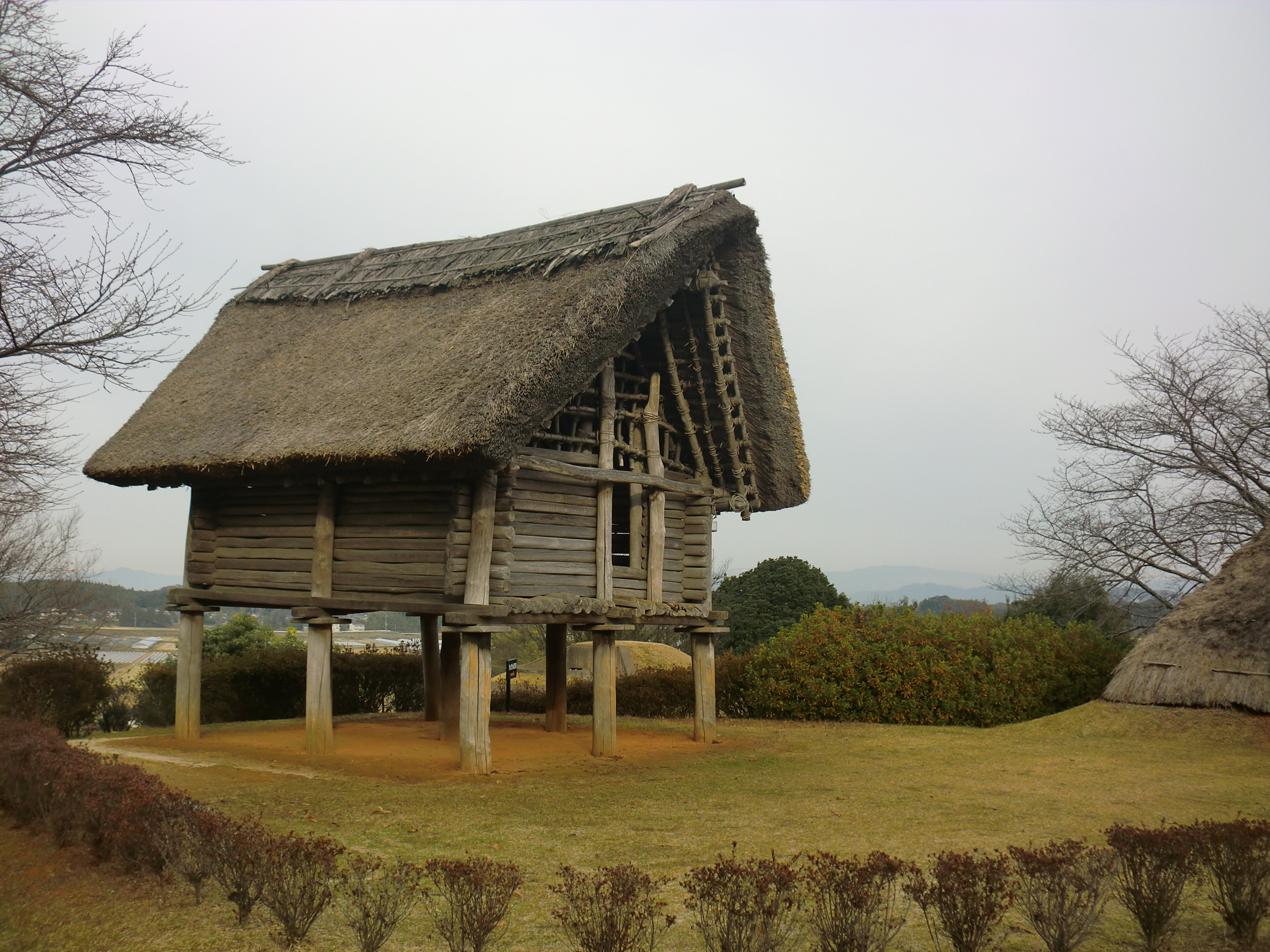
Reconstructed building at Tsukawara Historical Museum

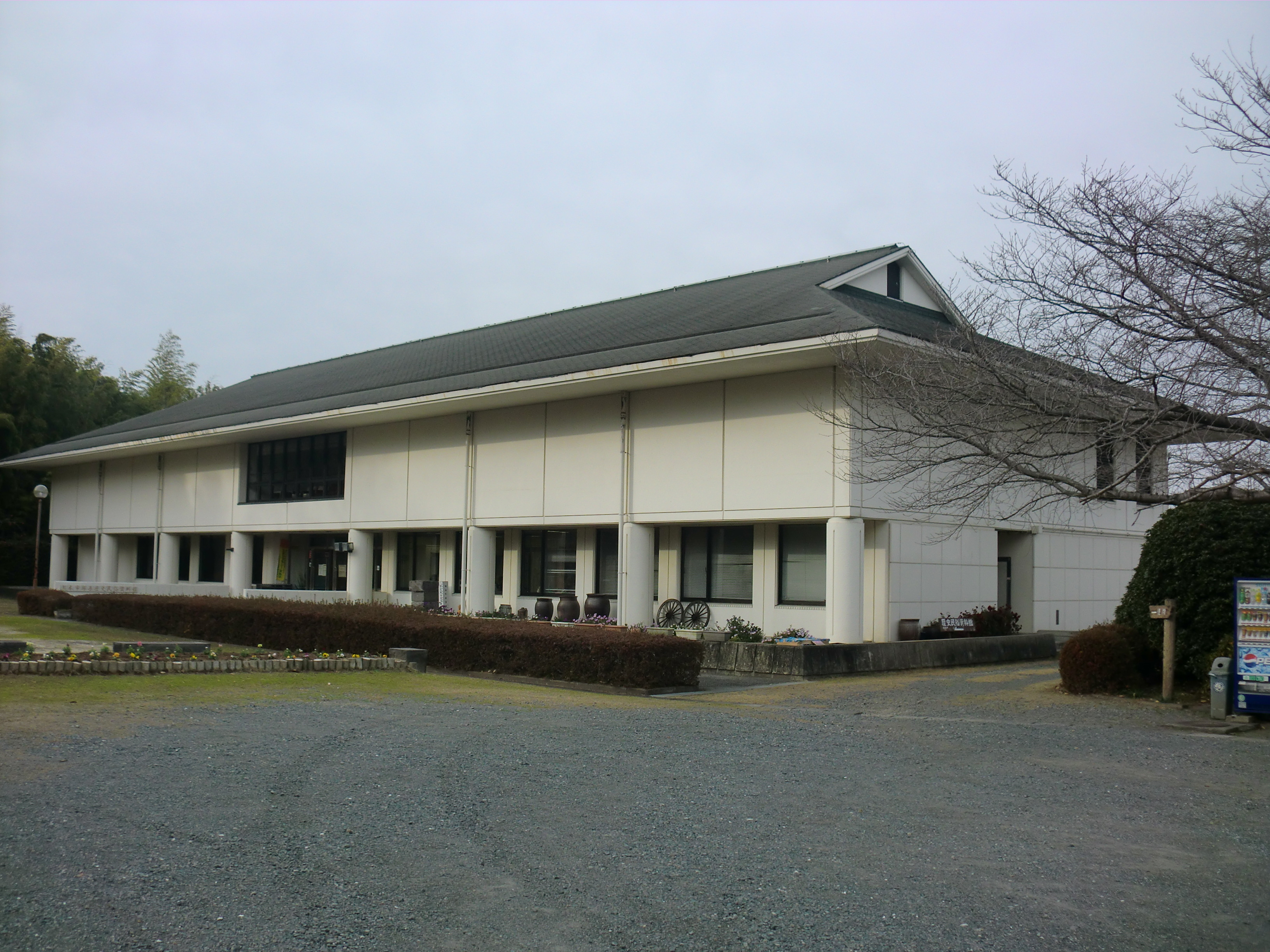
Kumamoto City Tsukawara Historical Museum

The site is about 30 minutes on car from Uto Station on the JR West Kagoshima Main Line.

== See also ==
- List of Historic Sites of Japan (Kumamoto)
