= Ōmura Cave Tomb Cluster =

- 大村横穴群 (Japanese)
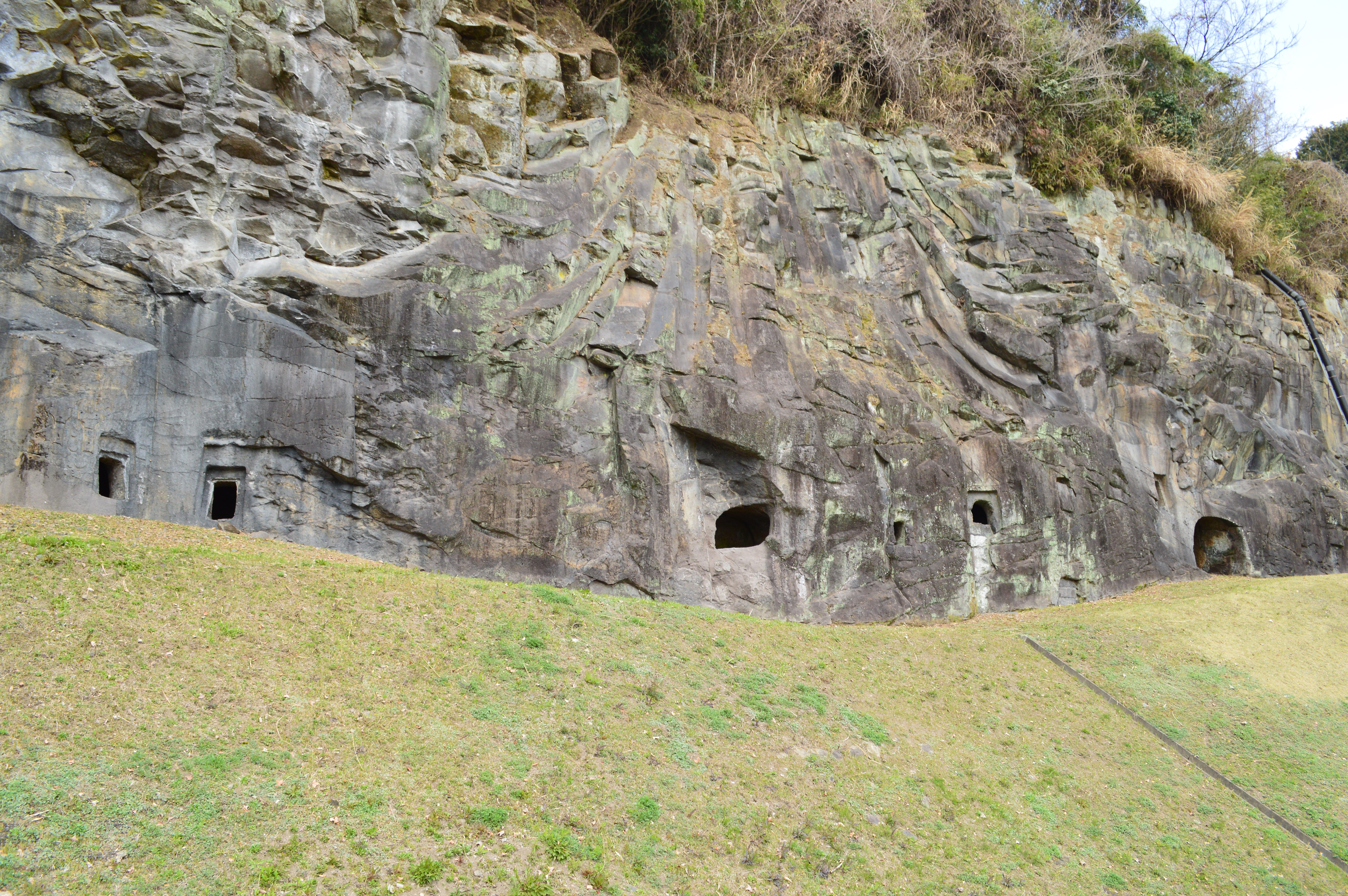
- Omura Yokoana Group

- Ōmura Cave Tomb Cluster Ōmura Cave Tomb Cluster (Japan)
- Interactive map of Ōmura Cave Tomb Cluster
- 32°13′01″N 130°45′15″E
- Type: necropolis
- Periods: Kofun period
- Location: Hitoyoshi, Kumamoto, Japan
- Region: Kyushu

History
- Built: 6th-7th century CE

Site notes
- Owner: Public
- Public access: Yes

The Ōmura Cave Tomb Cluster (大村横穴群, Ōmura yokoana-gun) is a cluster of yokoanabo tombs dug in artificial caves in a tuff cliff of located in the Shiromoto-machi neighborhood of the city of Hitoyoshi, Kumamoto Prefecture in Kyushu Japan. It was designated as a National Historic Site in 1921.

== Background ==
The Ōmura Cave Tombs are located over a 800-meter stretch from east-to-west on the cliffs on the south side of the Murayama Plateau on the right bank of the Kuma River, which runs through the south of the prefecture. These tombs were built during the Kofun period in the 6th and 7th centuries. The burial chambers are square with rounded corners and two or three sections for the corpse bed. There are 27 tombs in the group, eight of which are decorated kofun, with relief carings or paintings of animals, weapons, armor, and geometric patterns (circles, triangles, etc.) on the outside. The entrance gates are square or dome-shaped, and many have decorative borders. The inner wall of the chamber of cave 15 has five double circular lines engraved on it, while the outer wall of the gate has animals, weapons, armor, and geometric patterns (circles, triangles, etc.). In particular, cave 7 has eight triangular patterns arranged in a sawtooth pattern on the upper part of the outer wall, and in the upper right corner, a double triangular pattern is engraved on it, and on the right side, a kite-shaped quiver is drawn with ten arrows. Furthermore, five horses are engraved on the outer wall on the left, which is noteworthy for its dynamic and three-dimensional depiction. In addition, in the No. 11 cave, two quivers, five circular patterns, and a knife are painted on the left side of the outer wall, and one quiver is painted on the right side. In the No. 14 cave, a wheel shape and a shield are painted on the top and two quivers are painted on the left.

Excavated grave goods include a straight sword and Sue ware pottery. The site is about a five-minute walk from Hitoyoshi Station on the JR Kyushu Hisatsu Line.

== See also ==
- List of Historic Sites of Japan (Kumamoto)
- Decorated kofun
