= Yatsushiro Castle =

Castle in Kumamoto, Japan

Shibushi Castle
- 八代城
- Yatsushiro, Kumamoto Prefecture, Japan
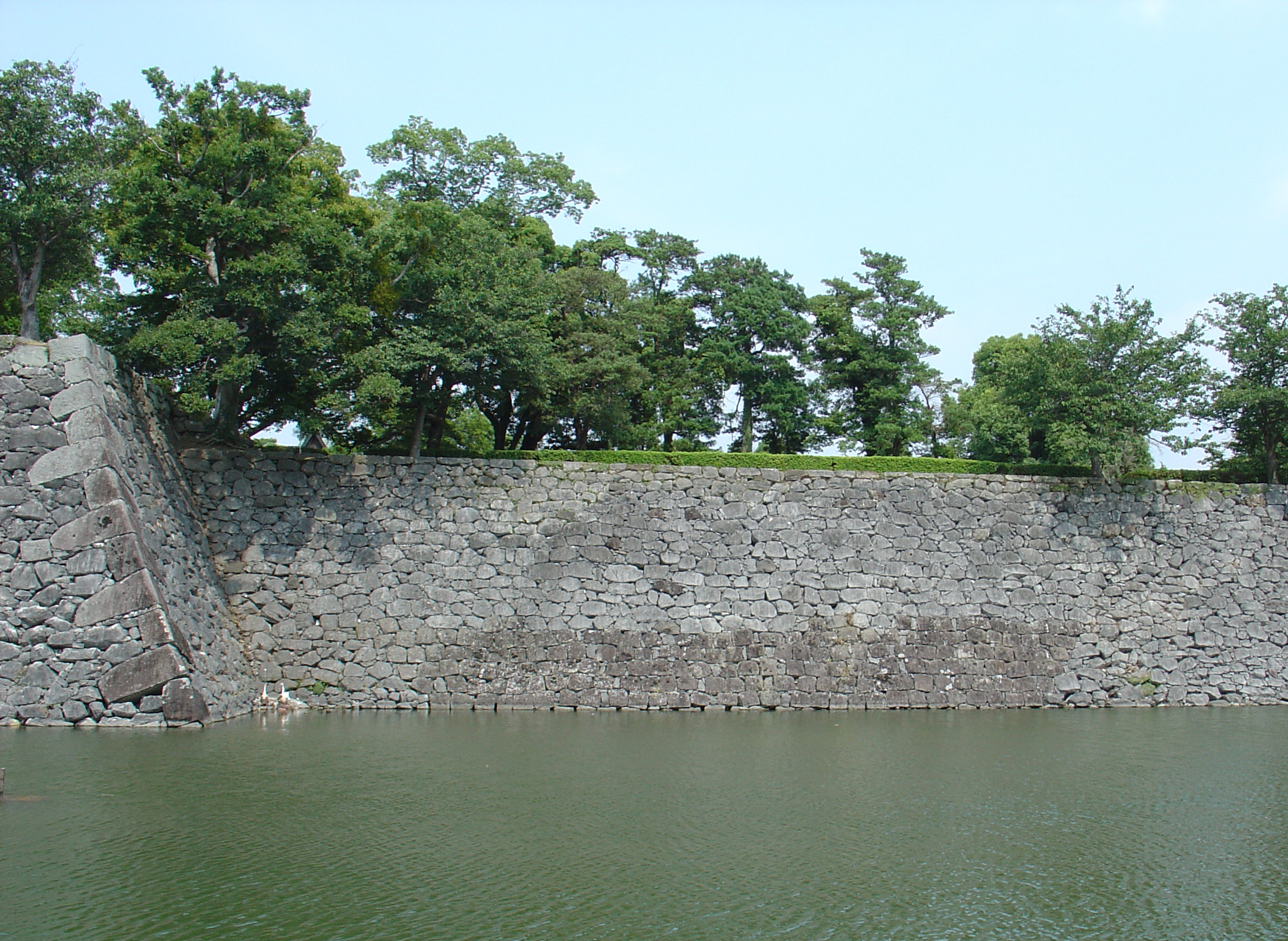
- Stone wall of Yatsushiro Castle

Site information
- Type: Hirajiro-style castle
- Owner: Matsui clan
- Condition: ruins

Location
- Coordinates: 32.5077°N 130.5998°E

Site history
- Built: 1622
- Built by: Masataka Katō
- Demolished: 1870

Garrison information
- Past commanders: Hosokawa Tadaoki

Yatsushiro Castle (八代城, Yatsushiro-jō) is the remains of a castle structure in Yatsushiro, Kumamoto Prefecture, Japan.

In 1619, Mugishima Castle collapsed due to a large earthquake then Katō Kiyomasa's son Kato Tadahiro ordered his vassal Katō Masataka to build a new castle. In 1632, Hosokawa Tadaoki entered the castle by the Tokugawa shogunate's order and spent retired life in the kitanomaru compound of the castle.

The castle is now only ruins, just some remnants of water moats and stone walls. Yatsushiro Castle was registered as a National Historic Site in 2014 as one of the Remains of Yatsushiro Castles, combining both Furufumoto Castle and Mugishima Castle. Yatsushiro castle was listed as one of the Continued Top 100 Japanese Castles in 2017.

== Gallery ==
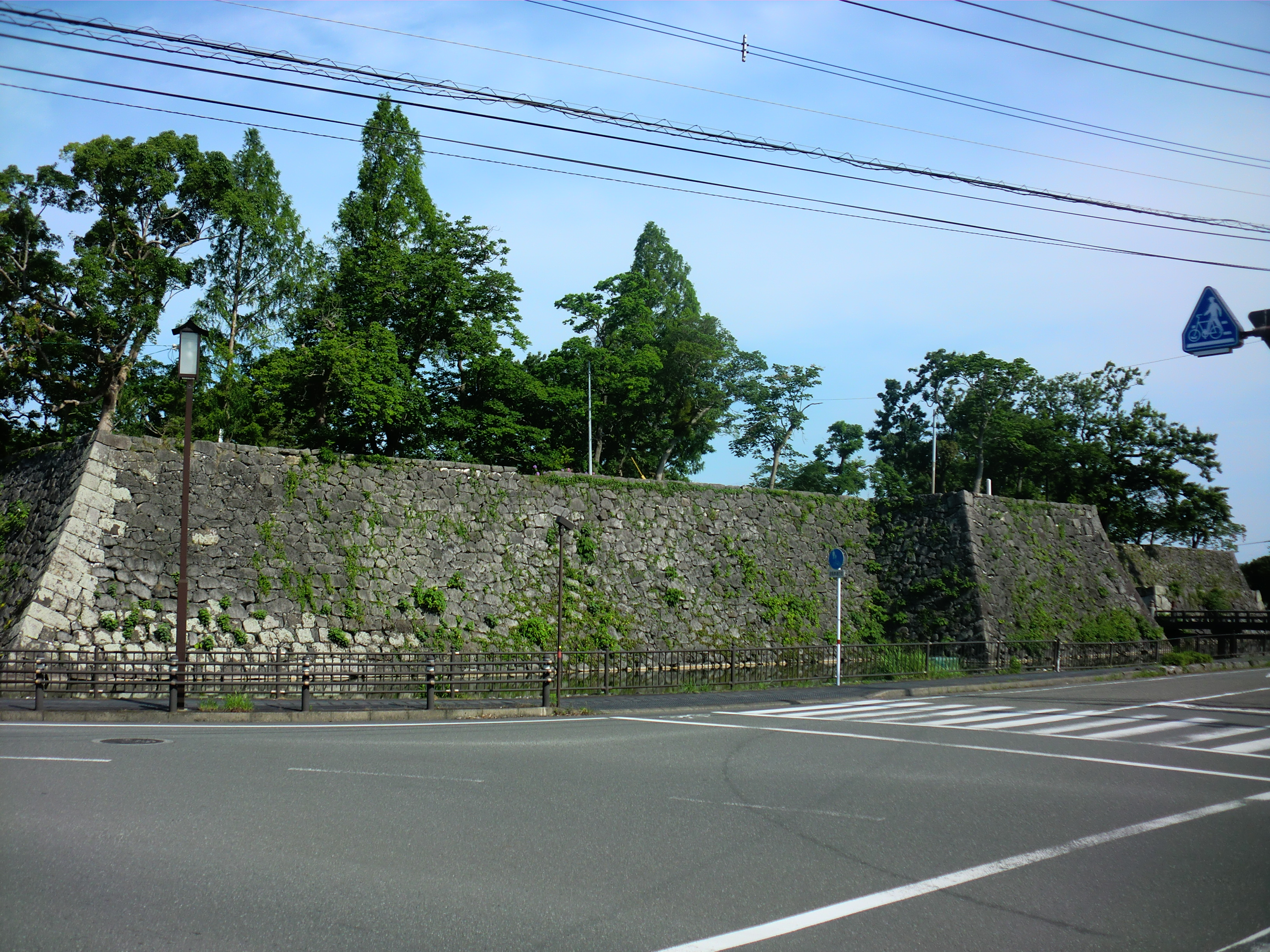
stone wall of Yatsushiro castle

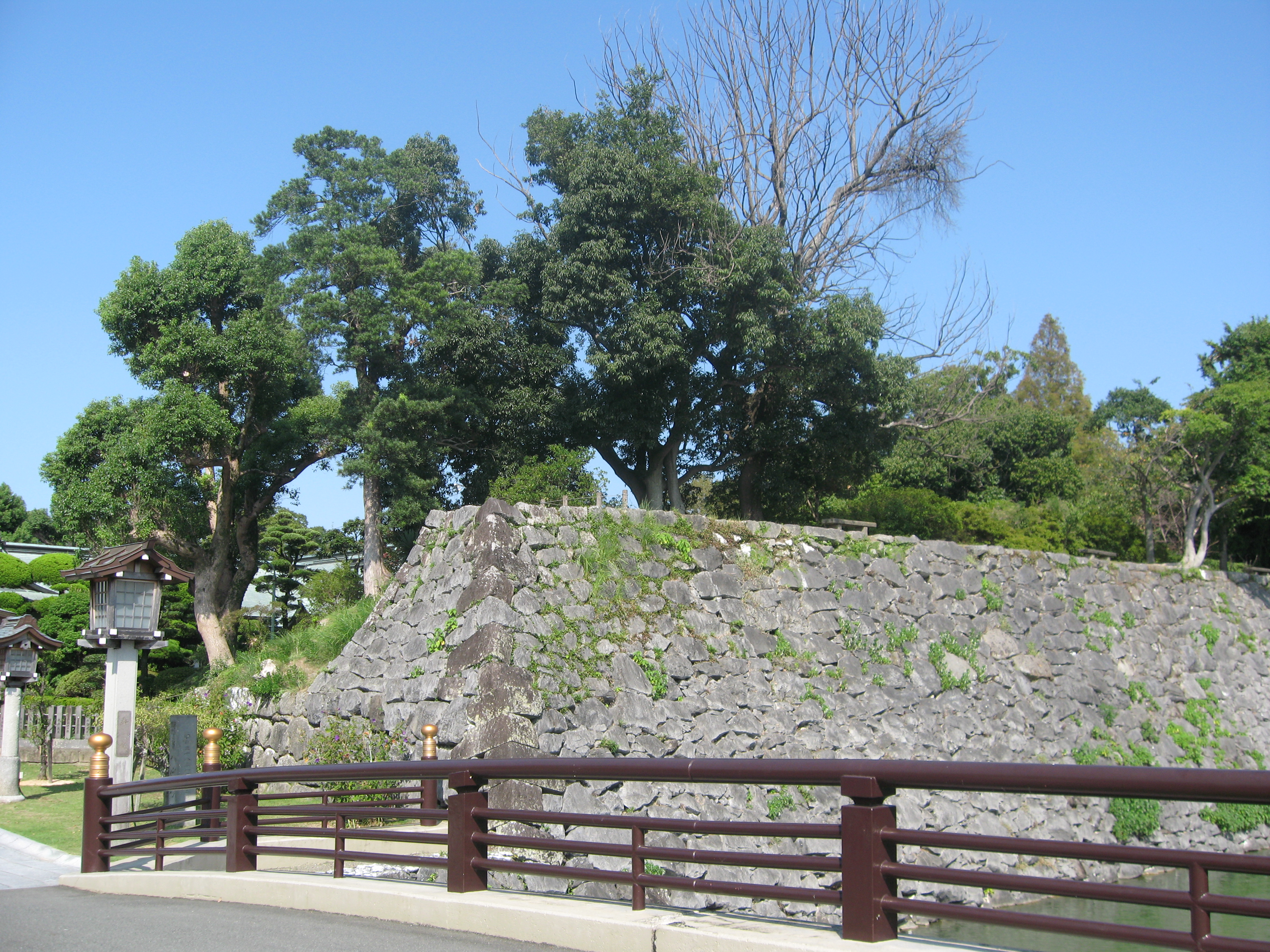
stone wall of Yatsushiro castle

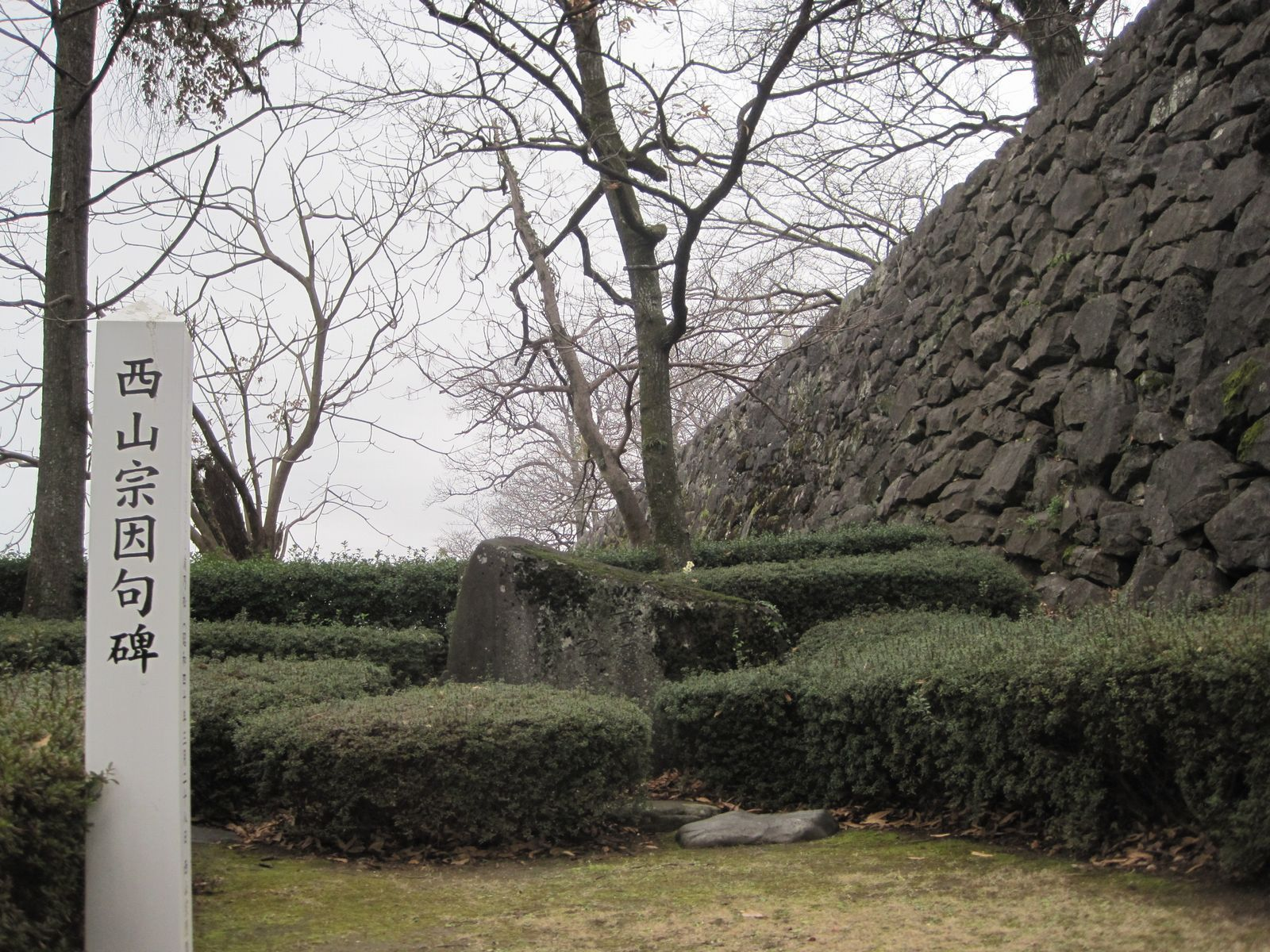
stone wall of Yatsushiro castle

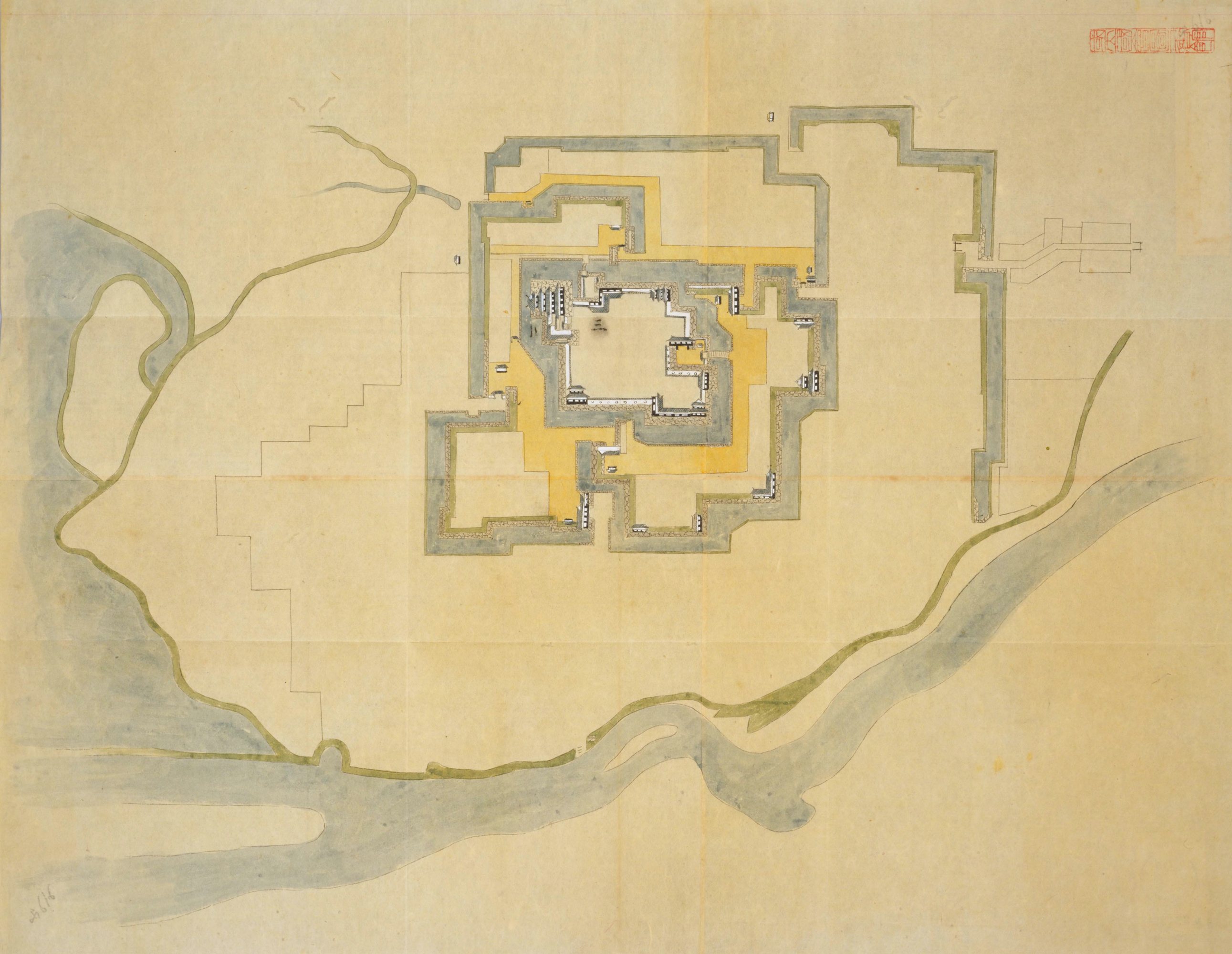
Old map of Yatsushiro castle

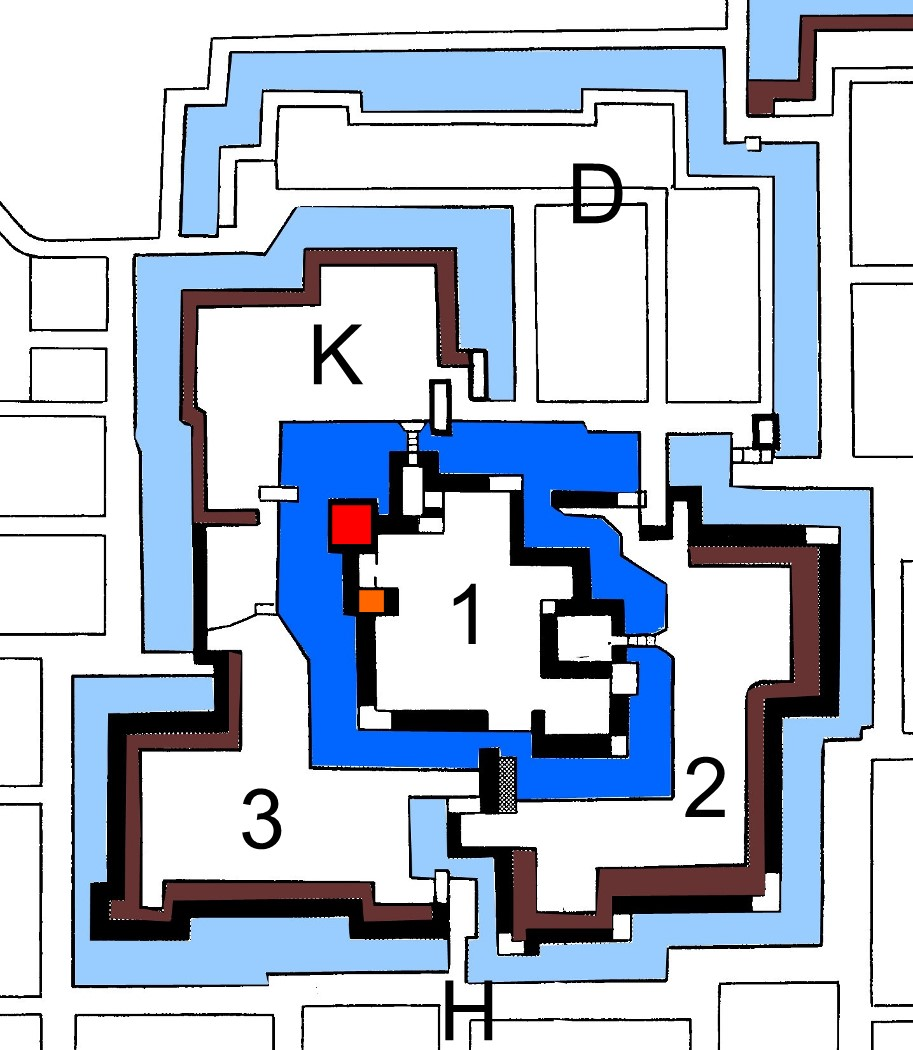
Lay out of Yatsushiro castle

== See also ==
- List of Historic Sites of Japan (Kumamoto)

== Literature ==
- De Lange, William (2021). An Encyclopedia of Japanese Castles. Groningen: Toyo Press. pp. 600 pages. ISBN 978-9492722300.
