= Hikawa, Kumamoto =

Hikawa 氷川町
- Town
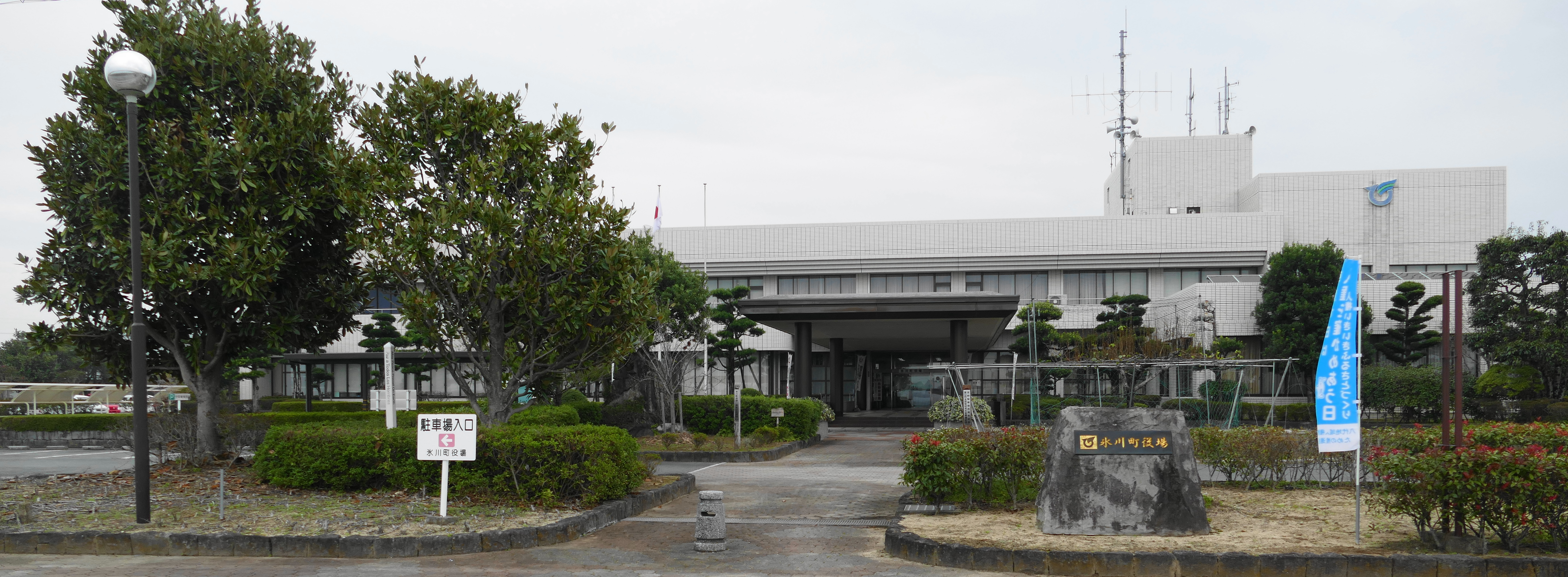
- Hikawa town hall

- Flag Chapter
- Interactive map of Hikawa
- Location in Japan
- Coordinates: 32°34′57″N 130°40′25″E
- Country: Japan
- Region: Kyushu
- Prefecture: Kumamoto
- District: Yatsushiro

Area
  - Total: 33.36 km^{2} (12.88 sq mi)

Population (August 31, 2024)
  - Total: 10,775
  - Density: 323.0/km^{2} (836.5/sq mi)
- Time zone: UTC+09:00 (JST)
- City hall address: 642 Shimaji, Hikawa-cho, Yatsushiro-gun, Kumamoto-ken 869-4814
- Website: Official website
- Symbols
- Bird: Barn swallow
- Flower: Sakura
- Tree: Pyrus pyrifolia

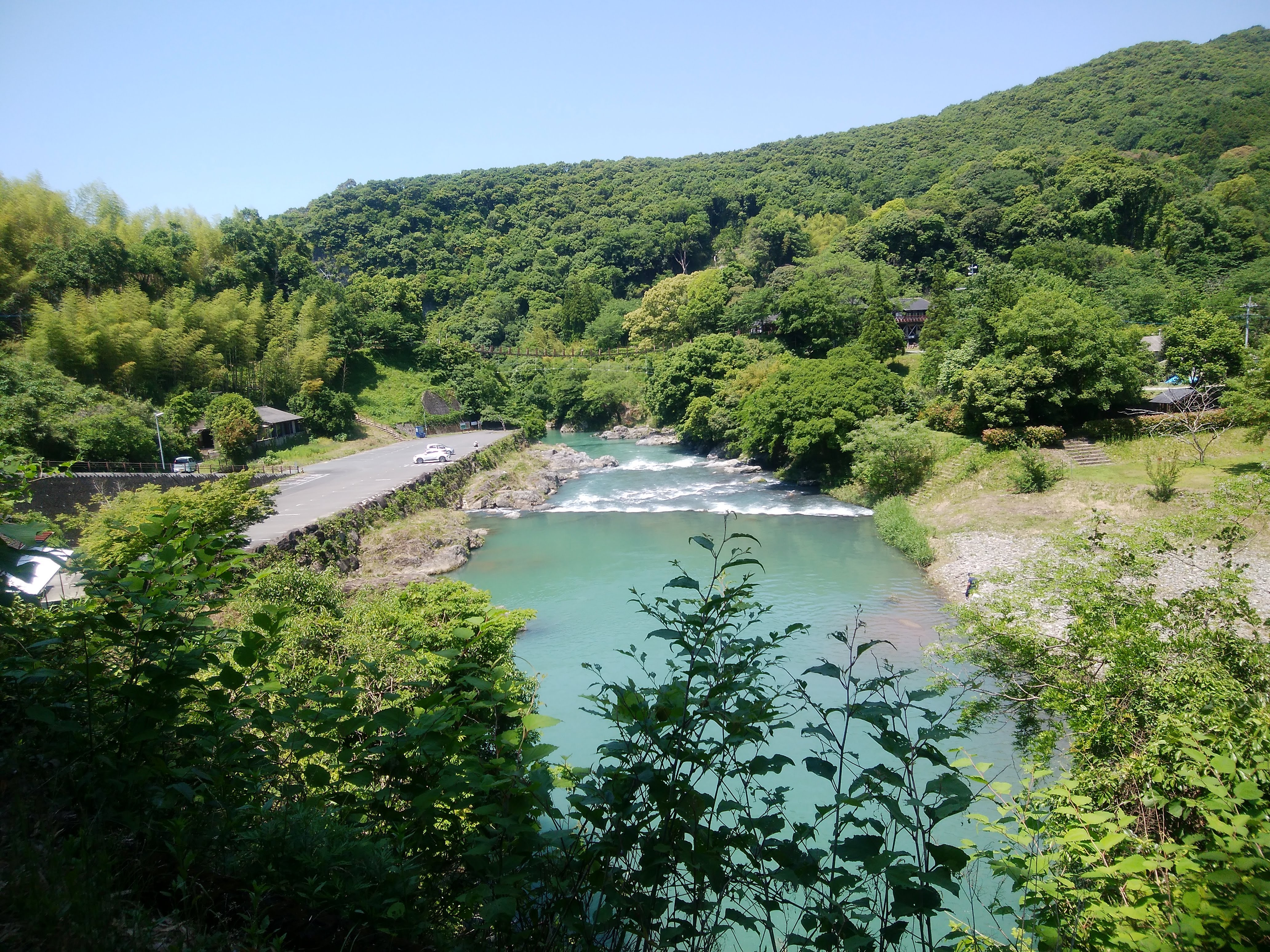
Hikawa RIver

Hikawa (氷川町, Hikawa-chō) is a town located in Yatsushiro District, Kumamoto Prefecture, Japan. As of 31 August 2024, the town had an estimated population of 10,775 in 4567 households, and a population density of 320 persons per km^{2}. The total area of the town is 33.36 km^{2} (12.88 sq mi).

== Geography ==
Hikawa is located in west-center Kumamoto Prefecture; the northwestern part faces the Yatsushiro Sea. The Hikawa River flows from southeast to northwest along the border with Yatsushiro. The entire area of the town is part of the Yatsushiro Plain.

=== Surrounding municipalities ===
Kumamoto Prefecture

- Uki
- Yatsushiro

=== Climate ===
Hikawa has a humid subtropical climate (Köppen Cfa) characterized by warm summers and cool winters with light to no snowfall. The average annual temperature in Hikawa is 16.0 °C. The average annual rainfall is 2213 mm with September as the wettest month. The temperatures are highest on average in August, at around 26.5 °C, and lowest in January, at around 5.5 °C.

=== Demographics ===
Per Japanese census data, the population of Hikawa is as shown below

Historical population
Year	Pop.	±%
1940	11,050	—
1950	15,654	+41.7%
1960	16,323	+4.3%
1970	14,614	−10.5%
1980	14,624	+0.1%
1990	14,646	+0.2%
2000	13,725	−6.3%
2010	12,715	−7.4%
2020	11,094	−12.7%

== History ==
The area of Hikawa was part of ancient Higo Province, During the Edo Period it was part of the holdings of Kumamoto Domain. After the Meiji restoration, the town of Miyahara and villages of Yoshino, Nozu, and Wakashima were established with the creation of the modern municipalities system on April 1, 1889. The villages merged on April 1, 1954, to form the village of Ryuhoku, which was raised to town status on April 1, 1974. The town of Hikawa was formed on October 1, 2005, from the merger of the towns of Miyahara and Ryūhoku.

The town was hit by the 2026 Kumamoto earthquake with JMA seismic intensity 7.

== Government ==
Hikawa has a mayor-council form of government with a directly elected mayor and a unicameral city council of 10 members. Hikawa, collectively with the city of Yatsushiro, contributes four members to the Kumamoto Prefectural Assembly. In terms of national politics, the town is part of the Kumamoto 4th district of the lower house of the Diet of Japan.

== Economy ==
The main industry is agriculture, and the town is known for producing pears and rush grass, which is used to make tatami mats.

== Education ==
Hikawa has three public elementary schools and two public junior high school operated by the town government. The town does not have a high school.

== Transportation ==
=== Railways ===
The JR Kyushu Kyushu Shinkansen and Kagoshima Main Line pass through the town's Ryuhoku district, but there is no station. The nearest train station is Arisa Station on the Kagoshima Main Line in Yatsushiro.

=== Highways ===
- Kyushu Expressway
- National Route 3
- National Route 443

== Local attractions ==
- Nozu Kofun Cluster, National Historic Site
- Ōno-no-Iwa Kofun, National Historic Site

== Notable people from Hikawa ==
- Koji Akiyama, retired professional baseball player
- Uchida Kosai, statesman
- Hoshiro Mitsunaga, founder of Dentsu
