= Hanaguri Ide =

Canal in Kikuyō, Kumamoto, Japan

The Hanaguri Ide (鼻ぐり井手, Hanaguri Ide) is a specially constructed 387-meter canal in Kikuyō, Kumamoto, Japan, which lets water flow into the downstream without depositing the mixed ash. The Aso area from which water flows is rich in such ash, volcanic in nature. This structure was credited to Katō Kiyomasa who had it constructed it in the early 1600s.

== Etymology ==
"Hanaguri" is the Japanese word for an ox's muzzle-ring. The Hanaguri Ide looks like such a ring.

Another term is Karakawano Tsukumobane (辛川の九十九刎, Karakawano Tsukumobane) or the "99 splashes of Karakawa" (the location of the canal). It is also called Karakawano Tsuzuraore.

== Structure ==
Katō Kiyomasa (加藤 清正, Katō Kiyomasa) (1562 - 1611) was a daimyō who entered Kumamoto in 1588. He was known not only as a samurai but also as a castle builder and as one who controlled rivers. He designed a 113-meter-wide dam to control the flow of Shirakawa River, at Babagusu village, followed by a 1,638-meter canal and a 387-meter special canal called Hanaguri Ide. The rock bed had 2-meter-wide tunnels, interconnected and situated alternately at different heights, so that the entering water would crash violently and come in contact with the surfaces of each tunnel, and ash would whirl down the downstream.

There were officials who did not understand the structure, and destroyed 52 holes. However, with 28 holes remaining, Hanaguri Ide worked well. The Hanaguri Ide enriched wide areas good for rice fields, so that tax revenues tripled after the construction of Hanaguri Ide.

== Improvements in agriculture ==
A number of rice fields were developed due to Hanaguri Ide:

- Nuyamazu Tenaga area: about 21 chō (1 chō is 2.451 acres)
- Ozu Tenaga area:about 33 chō
- Honjo Tenaga area:about 23 chō

== The period of construction ==
It was assumed to be between 1600 and 1611 based on the personal history of Katō Kiyomasa who governed the Higo country. There was a reference that the dam was constructed in 1608.

== Floods ==
Hanaguri Ide experienced two big floods; one in July, 1796 and another on June 26, 1953 or 1953 North Kyushu Flood. Especially the latter flood contained volcanic ash due to the eruption of Mount Aso, Kumamoto Prefecture. There was a monument after the reconstruction of the dam as follows.

== The Monument ==
History: Originally, Hanagiru Ide was constructed by Katō Kiyomasa in order to cultivate and enrich the land making a side river branch of Shirakawa River between Hakusui Mura and Tomiai Mura (name of place) 350 years ago. Hanaguri Ide was constructed to remove sand and ash letting water flow smoothly, and enriching the areas as rice fields as large as 95 chō. Incidentally, there was a big flood containing volcanic ash from Mount Aso on June 26, 1953. With the national budget of 5,900,0000 yen, the Babagusu dam was reconstructed in October 1955. Share the joy of construction and never forget the history of the dam. October 1955, Atsushi Okamoto, Kumamoto Prefecture Assembly Disaster Committee Member
