= Adaka-Kurobashi Shell Mound =

Archaeological site in Kumamoto, Japan

Adaka-Kurobashi Shell Midden
- 阿高黒橋貝塚 (Japanese)
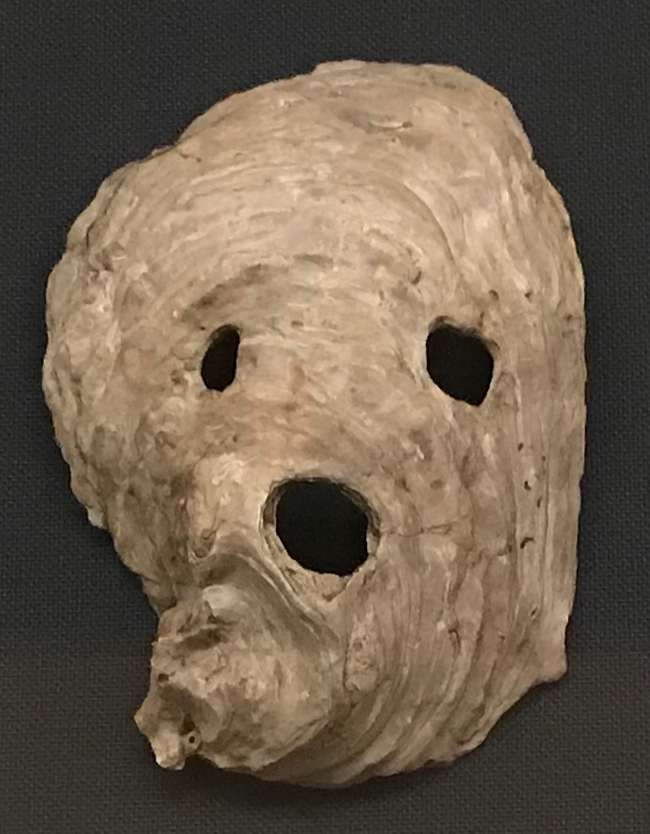
- Oyster shell mask from the Adaka-Kurobashi Shell Midden

- Adaka-Kurobashi Shell Midden Adaka-Kurobashi Shell Mound (Japan)
- 32°42′09″N 130°43′26″E
- Type: shell midden
- Periods: Jōmon period
- Location: Kumamoto, Kumamoto, Japan
- Region: Kyushu

Site notes
- Public access: Yes (no facilities at site)
- National Historic Site of Japan

The Adaka-Kurobashi Shell Midden (阿高黒橋貝塚, Adaka-Kurobashi kaizuka) is an archaeological site in what is now the Jonan neighborhood of the city of Kumamoto, Kumamoto Prefecture, Japan with a pair of late Jōmon period shell middens. The site was designated a National Historic Site in 1980 by the Japanese government.

== Overview ==
During the early to middle Jōmon period (approximately 4000 to 2500 BC), sea levels were five to six meters higher than at present, and the ambient temperature was also 2 deg C higher. During this period, Kyushu was inhabited by the Jōmon people, many of whom lived in coastal settlements. The middens associated with such settlements contain bone, botanical material, mollusc shells, sherds, lithics, and other artifacts and ecofacts associated with the now-vanished inhabitants, and these features, provide a useful source into the diets and habits of Jōmon society. Most of these middens are found along the Pacific coast of Japan; however, this site is located at the edge of the hills at the northeastern foot of Mt. Kihara, at the southern end of the Kumamoto Plain, facing the Ariake Sea.

The Adaka Shell Mound is located on the left bank of the Hado River at an elevation of 14 meters and Kurohashi Shell Mound is located on the right bank of the Hamado River on the north side at an elevation of 3 meters. The Adaka Shell Mound was discovered during a land reclamation project in 1916 and more that 50 human remains were discovered, along with numerous examples of Jōmon pottery and stone tools. One of the human remains was that of an old woman with two ark shell rings on her left arm. The Kurobashi Shell Mound was discovered in 1972 in a paddy field that had been eroded by flooding of the Hamado River during heavy rains. Subsequent archaeological excavations revealed that both sites were actually parts of the same midden that had been continuously operated from the middle to the first half of the late Jōmon period, and that the center had shifted slightly from Adaka Shell Mound to Kurohashi Shell Mound site as time went on. Pottery from the site is designated "Adaka-style pottery" and is characterized by patterns drawn with thick sunken lines and no rope patterns. It has been found widely distributed in northern Kyushu. The shell lavers of the found revealed 37 types of shellfish, including oysters and clams, and 15 types of fish, including pufferfish and red sea bream, as well as wild boars, deer, dogs, snakes, and frogs, shedding light on the Jōmon diet.

A unique artifact found at the site is a mask made from a large oyster shell found at the Adaka Shell Mound. Similar masks made from shells have been found at Jōmon sites in northern Kyushu from the middle to late period, but they have not been found at sites in Honshu, making them a unique part of Kyushu's culture.

The Kurohashi Shell Mound was developed into a park in 2004. The site approximately 15 minutes by car from Uto Station on the JR Kyushu Kagoshima Main Line.

== See also ==
- List of Historic Sites of Japan (Kumamoto)
