= Jinnouchi Castle =

- 陣ノ内城
- Kōsa, Kumamoto Prefecture, Japan

Site information
- Type: flatland-style Japanese castle
- Open to the public: no facilities
- Condition: Ruins

Location
- Location within Kumamoto Prefecture Location within Japan
- Coordinates: 32°38′58″N 130°48′58″E

Site history
- Built by: Konishi Yukinaga
- National Historic Site of Japan

Jinnouchi Castle (陣ノ内城, Jinnouchi-jō) was a flatlands-style Japanese castle located in the Nishikatahonjō neighborhood of the town of Kōsa, Kumamoto Prefecture, Japan. The ruins were designated a National Historic Site in 2021.

== History ==
Jinnouchi Castle was constructed in 1588 by Konishi Yukinaga, who has been assigned the southern half of Higo Province by Toyotomi Hideyoshi.

Based on historical documents from the mid-Edo period, the castle was believed to have been the site of the "Jinnouchi-kan" residence of Aso Daigūji (Grand Priests) of Aso Shrine and the rulers of Higo Province since the Kofun period.

Subsequent research into related historical documents has cast some doubt of this theory, and the name was changed officially changed to "castle ruins."

Archaeological excavations have found shards of imported ceramics from the Kamakura and early Muromachi period, hinting that Konishi Yukinaga built the castle on the site of the Aso clan's stronghold.

== Layout ==
The castle was built at a strategic location for land and water transportation on flat ground approximately 100 meters above sea level, overlooking the Midorigawa River and the surrounding plains. The moat and earthworks along its interior remain clearly visible.

Excavations have revealed that the castle stretched over 210 meters east-to-west and over 190 meters north-to-south. The castle was originally a square structure with gates on the northwest and southeast.

== Access ==
The castle site is approximately 1.6 kilometers east of the Kōsa Town Hall, and 17.2 kilometers east of Matsubase Station on the JR Kyushu Kagoshima Main Line.

== See also ==
- List of Historic Sites of Japan (Kumamoto)

== Literature ==
- Schmorleitz, Morton S. (1974). Castles in Japan. Tokyo: Charles E. Tuttle Co. pp. 144–145. ISBN 0-8048-1102-4.
- Motoo, Hinago (1986). Japanese Castles. Tokyo: Kodansha. p. 200 pages. ISBN 0-87011-766-1.
- Turnbull, Stephen (2003). Japanese Castles 1540-1640. Osprey Publishing. p. 64 pages. ISBN 1-84176-429-9.
