= Yamaga, Kumamoto =

Yamaga 山鹿市
- City
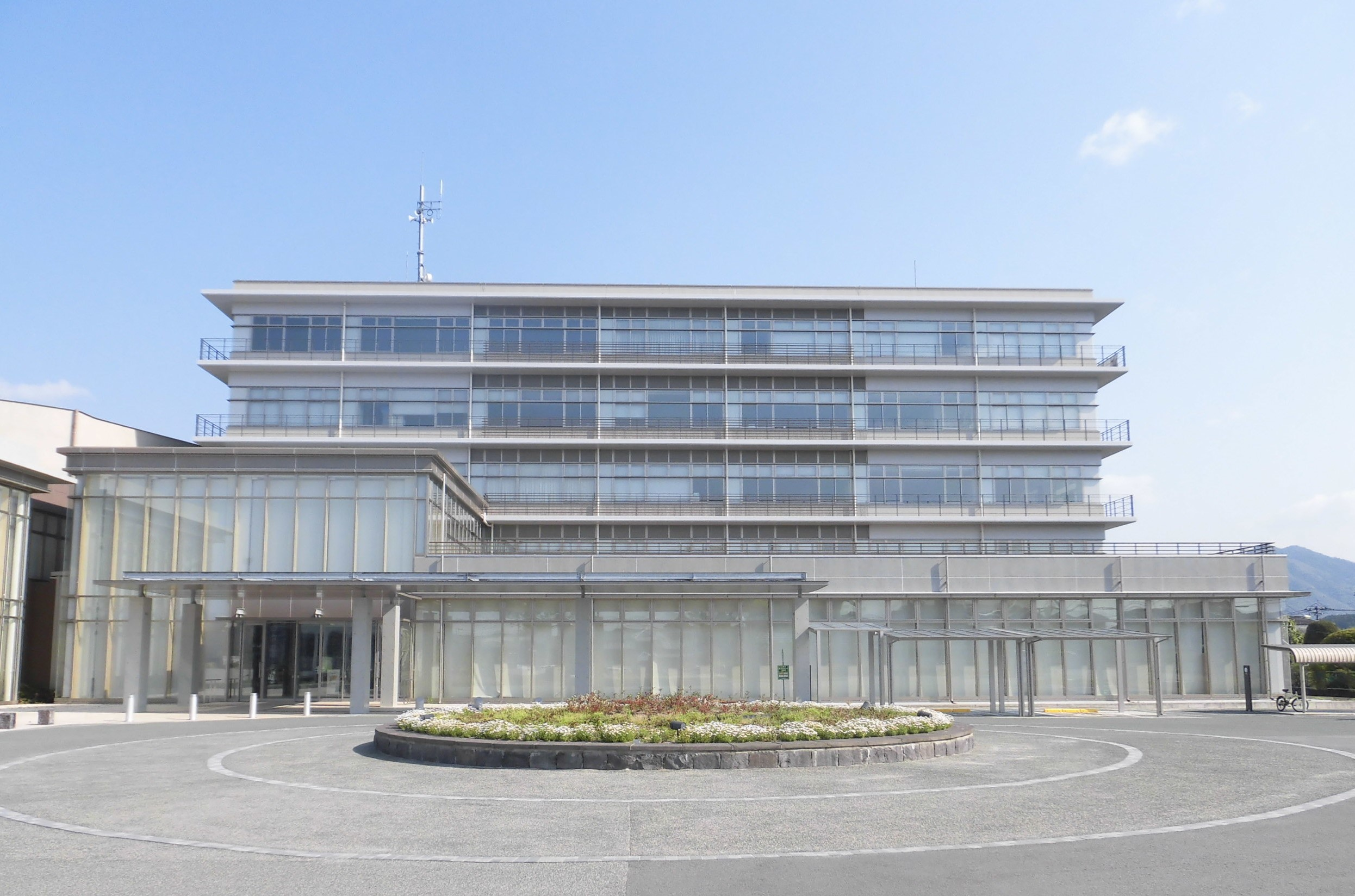
- Yamaga City Hall

- Flag Seal
- Location of Yamaga in Kumamoto Prefecture

- Location in Japan
- Coordinates: 33°1′3″N 130°40′28″E
- Country: Japan
- Region: Kyūshū
- Prefecture: Kumamoto

Government
  - Mayor: Jun'ichi Hayata

Area
  - Total: 299.69 km^{2} (115.71 sq mi)

Population (July 31, 2024)
  - Total: 48,181
  - Density: 160.77/km^{2} (416.39/sq mi)
- Time zone: UTC+09:00 (JST)
- Phone number: 0968-43-1117
- Address: 987-3 Yamaga, Yamaga-shi, Kumamoto-ken 861-0592
- Climate: Cfa
- Website: Official website
- Symbols
- Bird: Japanese bush warbler
- Flower: Rhododendron
- Tree: Osmanthus fragrans

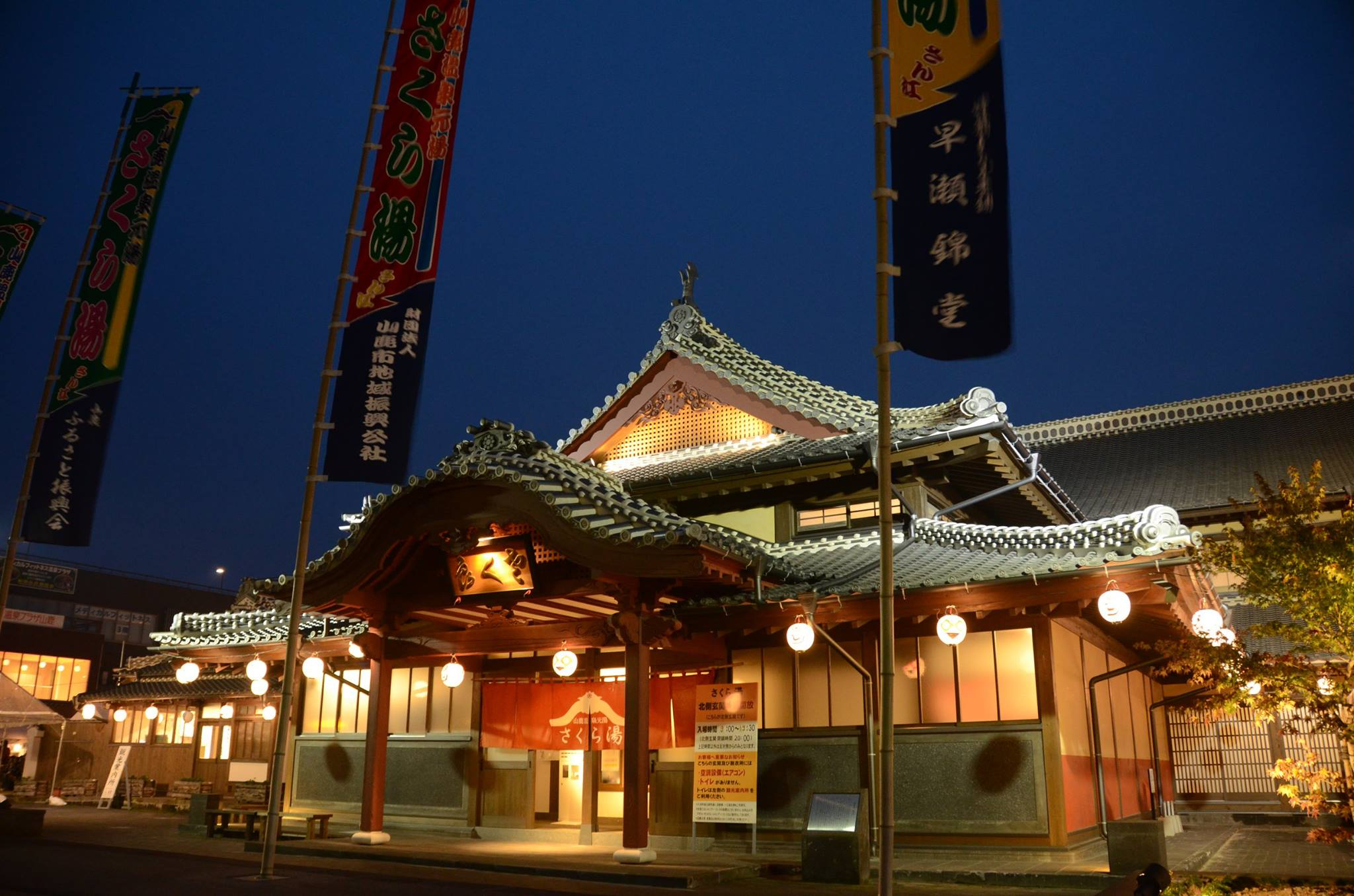
Yamaga Onsen

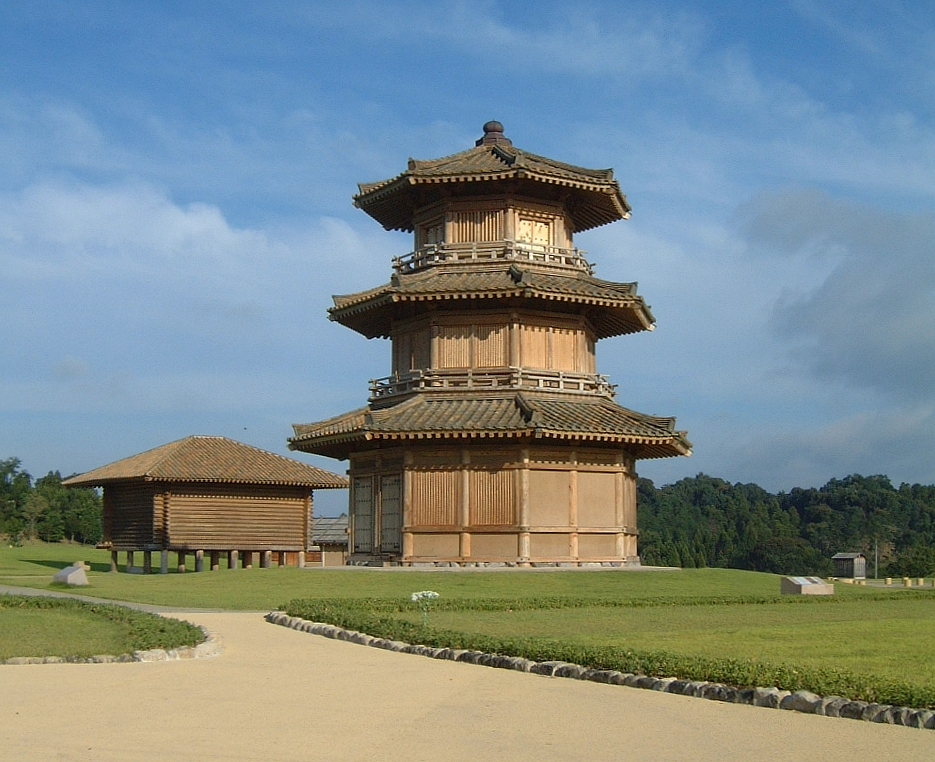
Kikuchi Castle ruins

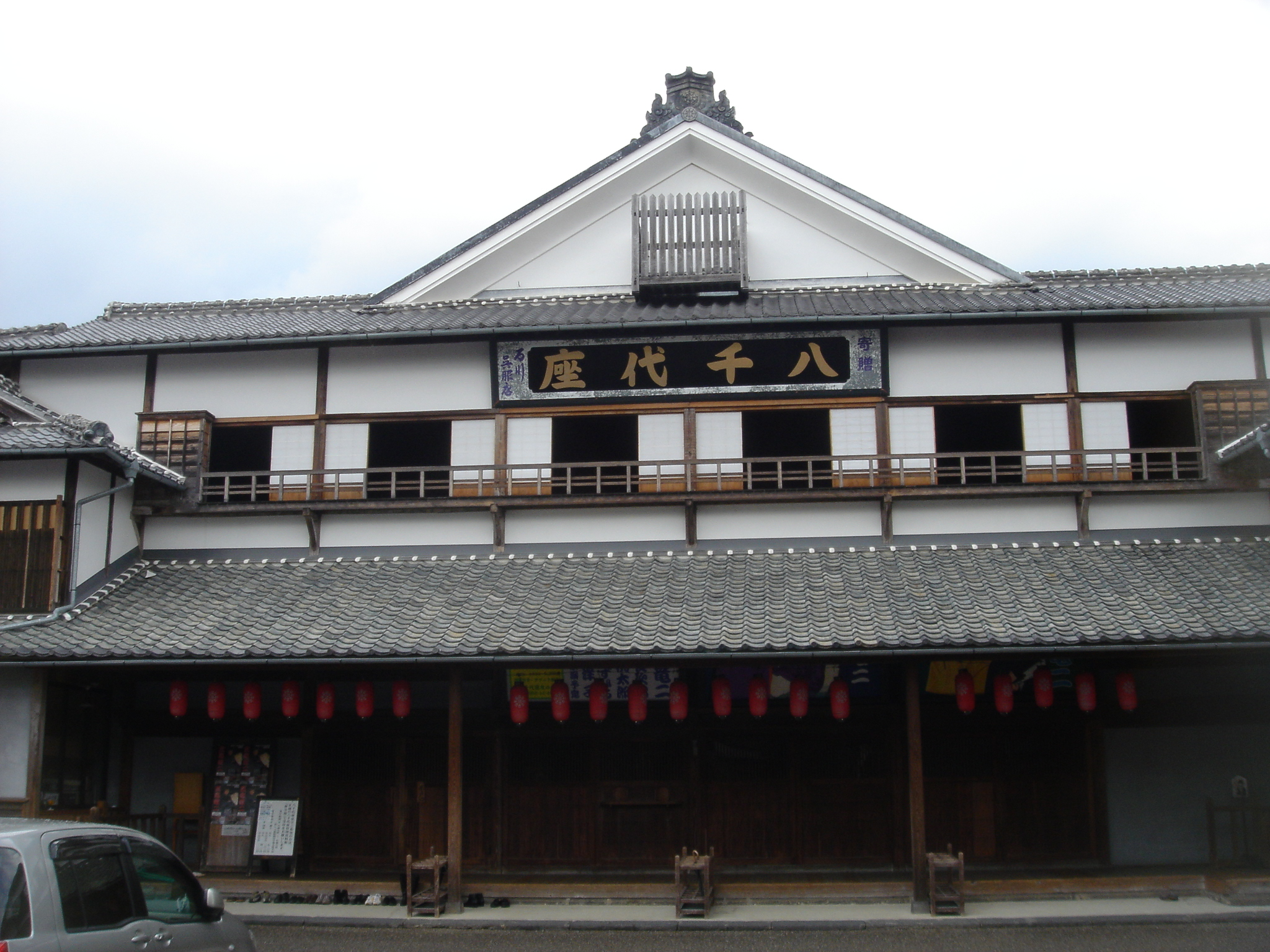
Yamaga Yachiyoza theatre

Yamaga (山鹿市, Yamaga-shi) is a city in Kumamoto Prefecture, Japan. As of 31 July 2024, the city had an estimated population of 48,181 in 21,996 households, and a population density of 160 persons per km^{2}. The total area of the city is 299.69 km^{2} (115.71 sq mi).

== Geography ==
Yamaga is located in the northern inland area of Kumamoto Prefecture, about 30 kilometers north of Kumamoto City. The city borders Fukuoka Prefecture from the north to the northeast, and Oita Prefecture to the east. The area from the urban center, which is slightly south of the geographic center, to the southern part (former Kikuka Town) is a basin. The northern to northeastern part of the city near the prefectural border is part of the Kyushu Mountains. The Kikuchi River flows through the center of the city.

=== Surrounding municipalities ===
Fukuoka Prefecture

- Yame

Kumamoto Prefecture

- Gyokutō
- Kikuchi
- Kumamoto
- Nagomi

Ōita Prefecture

- Hita

=== Climate ===
Yamaga has a humid subtropical climate (Köppen climate classification Cfa) with hot, humid summers and cool winters. There is significant precipitation throughout the year, especially during June and July. The average annual temperature in Yamaga is 14.9 °C (58.8 °F). The average annual rainfall is 2,177.9 mm (85.74 in) with July as the wettest month. The temperatures are highest on average in August, at around 26.3 °C (79.3 °F), and lowest in January, at around 3.5 °C (38.3 °F). The highest temperature ever recorded in Yamaga was 38.9 °C (102.0 °F) on 3 August 2026; the coldest temperature ever recorded was −10.1 °C (13.8 °F) on 19 February 1977.

Climate data for Kahoku, Yamaga (1991−2020 normals, extremes 1977−present)
Month	Jan	Feb	Mar	Apr	May	Jun	Jul	Aug	Sep	Oct	Nov	Dec	Year
Record high °C (°F)	22.0 (71.6)	24.4 (75.9)	28.5 (83.3)	30.9 (87.6)	35.3 (95.5)	34.9 (94.8)	37.7 (99.9)	38.9 (102.0)	36.5 (97.7)	32.5 (90.5)	28.8 (83.8)	24.0 (75.2)	38.9 (102.0)
Mean daily maximum °C (°F)	9.7 (49.5)	11.4 (52.5)	15.2 (59.4)	20.7 (69.3)	25.3 (77.5)	27.3 (81.1)	30.6 (87.1)	32.0 (89.6)	28.9 (84.0)	23.7 (74.7)	17.6 (63.7)	11.9 (53.4)	21.2 (70.2)
Daily mean °C (°F)	3.5 (38.3)	4.9 (40.8)	8.4 (47.1)	13.6 (56.5)	18.4 (65.1)	22.1 (71.8)	25.7 (78.3)	26.3 (79.3)	22.9 (73.2)	17.0 (62.6)	10.9 (51.6)	5.4 (41.7)	14.9 (58.9)
Mean daily minimum °C (°F)	−1.5 (29.3)	−0.9 (30.4)	2.1 (35.8)	6.8 (44.2)	11.9 (53.4)	17.7 (63.9)	22.0 (71.6)	22.0 (71.6)	18.2 (64.8)	11.4 (52.5)	5.3 (41.5)	0.2 (32.4)	9.6 (49.3)
Record low °C (°F)	−8.8 (16.2)	−10.1 (13.8)	−6.7 (19.9)	−3.9 (25.0)	0.9 (33.6)	6.3 (43.3)	12.7 (54.9)	13.7 (56.7)	6.2 (43.2)	−0.7 (30.7)	−3.7 (25.3)	−7.4 (18.7)	−10.1 (13.8)
Average precipitation mm (inches)	59.3 (2.33)	84.8 (3.34)	136.3 (5.37)	158.7 (6.25)	196.7 (7.74)	449.0 (17.68)	452.5 (17.81)	233.2 (9.18)	167.2 (6.58)	86.4 (3.40)	87.8 (3.46)	66.1 (2.60)	2,177.9 (85.74)
Average precipitation days (≥ 1.0 mm)	7.8	8.6	10.9	10.5	10.1	14.2	14.1	11.5	9.6	6.8	7.9	7.9	119.9
Mean monthly sunshine hours	119.5	128.6	162.2	186.2	196.4	124.6	157.2	190.2	169.8	179.8	143.4	126.6	1,884.6
Source: Japan Meteorological Agency

=== Demography ===
Per Japanese census data, the population of Yamaga is as shown below,

Historical population
Year	Pop.	±%
1960	76,209	—
1970	64,029	−16.0%
1980	62,839	−1.9%
1990	62,150	−1.1%
2000	59,491	−4.3%
2010	55,391	−6.9%
2020	49,025	−11.5%

== History ==
The area of Yamaga was part of ancient Higo Province. There are many burial mounds dating from the Kofun period within the city limitsm and the name "Yamaga" appears in early 8th century records. During the Kamakura period, the area developed as a hot spring town and in the Muromachi period it developed into a commercial settlement and a post town on the Buzen Kaido highway, and was noted for its production of umbrellas. During the Edo Period it was part of the holdings of Kumamoto Domain. It was the site of a battle during the 1877 Satsuma rebellion. After the Meiji restoration, the town of Yamaga was established with the creation of the modern municipalities system on April 1, 1889. On January 15, 2005, Yamaga absorbed the towns of Kahoku, Kamoto, Kaō and Kikuka (all from Kamoto District) to create the new and expanded city of Yamaga.

== Government ==
Yamaga has a mayor-council form of government with a directly elected mayor and a unicameral city council of 20 members. Yamaga contributes two members to the Kumamoto Prefectural Assembly. In terms of national politics, the city is part of the Kumamoto 3rd district of the lower house of the Diet of Japan.

== Economy ==
The local economy is based on agriculture and light manufacturing.

== Education ==
Yamaga has 15 public elementary schools and six public junior high schools operated by the city government, and three public high schools operated by the Kumamoto Prefectural Board of Education. There is also one private high school. The prefecture also operates a special education school for the handicapped.

== Transportation ==
=== Railways ===
Yamaga has no passenger railway services. The nearest train stations are Shin-Tamana Station on the Kyushu Shinkansen or either Tamana Station or Ueki Station on the JR Kyushu Kagoshima Main Line.

=== Highways ===
The Kyushu Expressway passes through the western part of the city, but there are no interchanges within the city

- National Route 3
- National Route 325
- National Route 443

== Local attractions ==
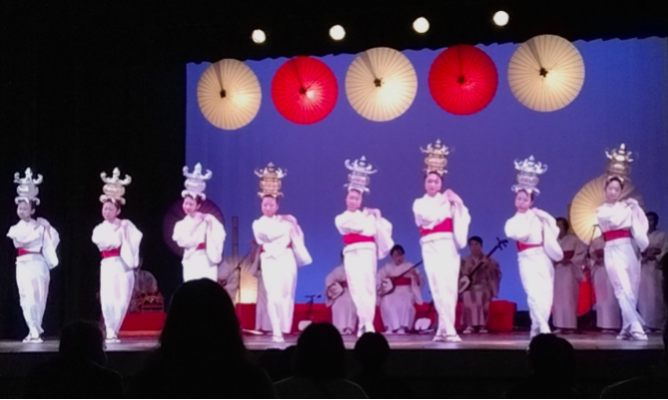
Dancers in Yachioza Theatre.

Attractions include the Kumamoto Prefectural Ancient Burial Mound Museum.

- Yamaga Bon-dancing Lantern Festival, every August event
- Yachioza Traditional Theater

=== National Historic Sites ===
- Benkei-ga-ana Kofun
- Chibusan-Obusan Kofun
- Iwabaru Kofun cluster
- Katōda Higashibaru Site
- Kikuchi Castle ruins
- Kumabe Clan Yakata
- Nabeta Cave Tombs

== Notable people from Yamaga ==
- Mayumi Aoki, swimmer
- Ryōtarō Araki, football player
- Chiyohakuhō Daiki, sumo wrestler
- Shin'ichi Etō, baseball player
- Daiki Inaba, professional wrestler
- Ikuo Kabashima, politician
- Sō Kawahara, football player
- Kiyoura Keigo, politician
- Raizō Matsuno, politician
- Yorihisa Matsuno, politician
- Kōhei Miyazaki, football player
- Kubushiro Ochimi, suffragist and temperance leader
