= Sōjōdaigakumae Station =

Railway station in Kumamoto, Japan

Sōjōdaigakumae Station 崇城大学前駅
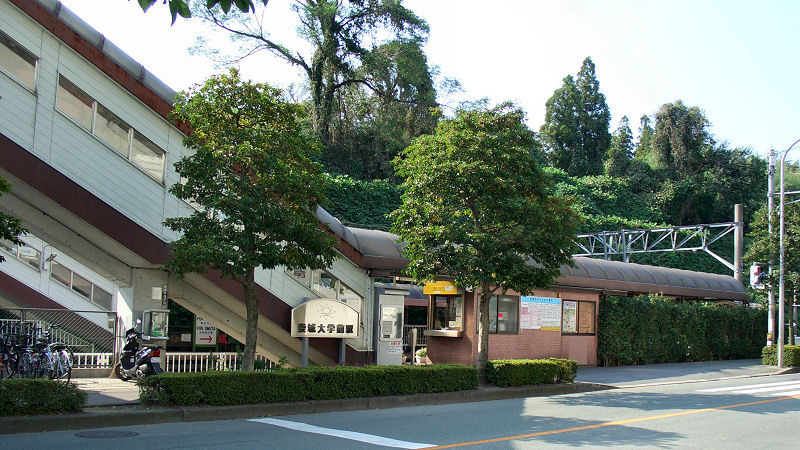
- Sōjōdaigakumae Station in 2006

General information
- Location: 4-chōme-19 Ikeda, Nishi-ku, Kumamoto-shi, Kumamoto-ken, 860-0082; Japan
- Coordinates: 32°49′51″N 130°41′42″E
- Operator: JR Kyushu
- Line: ■ Kagoshima Main Line,
- Distance: 191.7 km from Mojikō
- Platforms: 2 side platforms
- Tracks: 2

Construction
- Structure type: At grade
- Accessible: No - platforms linked by footbridge

Other information
- Status: Staffed ticket window (outsourced)
- Website: Official website

History
- Opened: 13 March 1988
- Former names: Kumamoto Kōdaimae (until 13 March 2004)

Passengers
- FY2020: 1021 daily
- Rank: 133rd (among JR Kyushu stations)

Services
| Preceding station | JR Kyushu | Following station |
|---|---|---|
| Kami-Kumamoto towards Kagoshima | Kagoshima Main Line | Nishisato towards Mojikō |
Location
- Location within Kumamoto Prefecture Location within Japan

Sōjōdaigakumae Station (崇城大学前駅, Sōjōdaigakumae-eki) is a passenger railway station located in the Nishi-ku ward of the city of Kumamoto, Kumamoto Prefecture, Japan. It is operated by JR Kyushu. The station name means, literally, "in front of Sojo University".

== Lines ==
The station is served by the Kagoshima Main Line and is located 191.7 km from the starting point of the line at Mojiko.

== Layout ==
The station consists of two side platforms serving two tracks at grade. There is no station building, only shelters on both platforms for waiting passengers and a small brickwork booth housing a ticket window. Access to the opposite side platform is by a footbridge.

Management of the station has been outsourced to the JR Kyushu Tetsudou Eigyou Co., a wholly owned subsidiary of JR Kyushu specialising in station services. It staffs the ticket counter which is equipped with a POS machine but does not have a Midori no Madoguchi facility.

=== Platforms ===
| 1 | ■ ■ Kagoshima Main Line | for Kumamoto and Yatsushiro |
| 2 | ■ ■ Kagoshima Main Line | for Tamana, Ōmuta and Tosu |

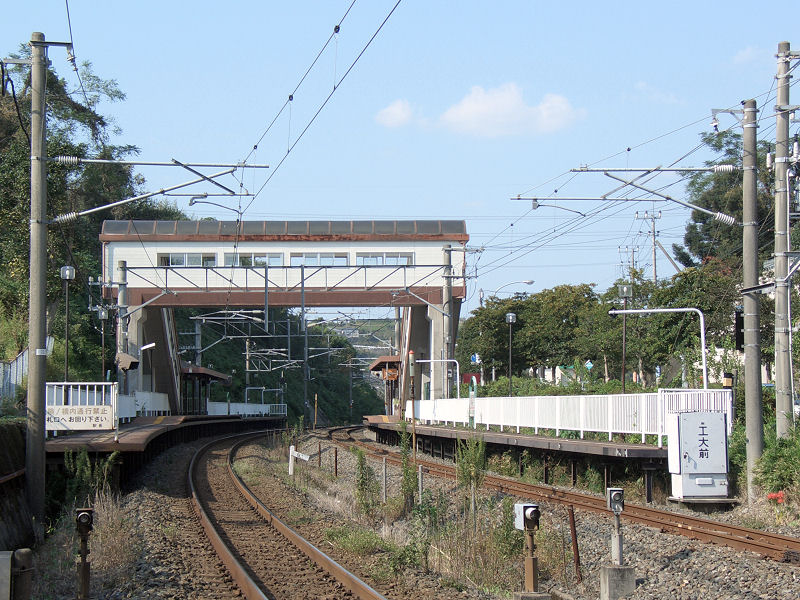
A view of the platforms and tracks.

== History ==
JR Kyushu opened the station on 13 March 1988 as an additional station on the existing track of the Kagoshima Main Line. At that time, the station was named Kumamoto Kōdaimae (熊本工大前駅), literally "in front of Kumamoto Industrial University", after the institute of higher education nearby. The university changed its name to Sojo University (崇城大学) in 2000. Four years later, the station followed suit, becoming Sōjōdaigakumae on 13 March 2004. With the privatization of JNR on 1 April 1987, JR Kyushu took over control of the station.

== Passenger statistics ==
In fiscal 2020, the station was used by an average of 1021 passengers daily (boarding passengers only), and it ranked 133rd among the busiest stations of JR Kyushu.

== Surrounding area ==
- Sojo University

== See also ==
- List of railway stations in Japan
