= Konoha =

Konoha (kanji: 木ノ葉; (tree's) leaves in Japanese) is a name that can refer to:

== People ==
- Konoha Sakuraba, (桜羽 このは; born 2000), Japanese idol of Yumemiru Adolescence group

== Places ==
- Konoha Station, a passenger railway station

== Characters ==
- Konoha Edajima, a character from Onegai Teacher
- Konoha Makise, a character from Hayate the Combat Butler
- Konoha Suetsugi, a character from Mikakunin de Shinkoukei
- Konoha, a character from the multimedia series: Kagerou Project
- Konoha (Konohagakure or The Village hidden in the leaves), a ninja village from anime series Naruto
