= Nishisato Station =

Railway station in Kumamoto, Japan

Nishisato Station 西里駅
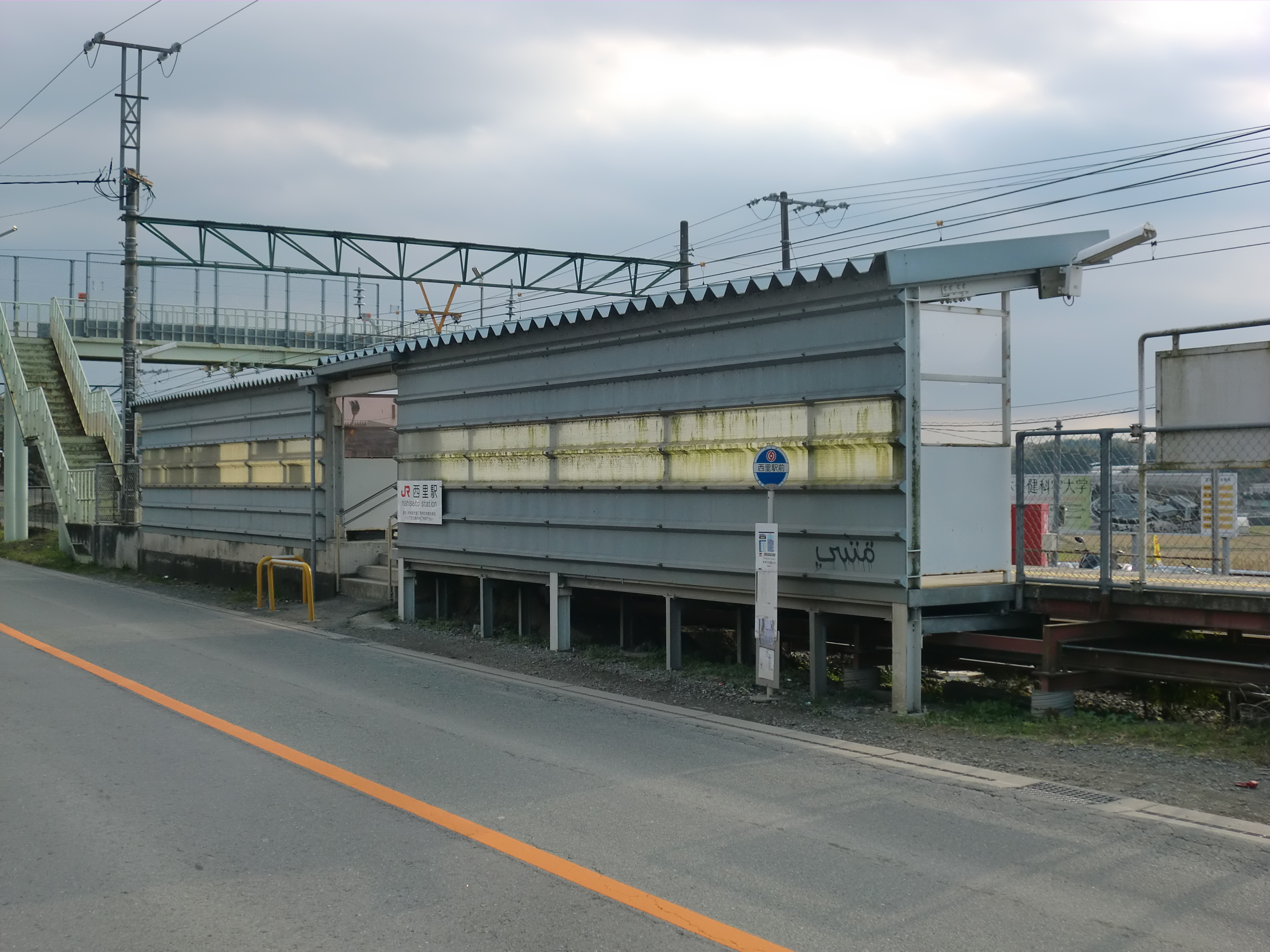
- Nishisato Station in 2013

General information
- Location: Shimosuzurikawamachi, Kita-ku, Kumamoto-shi, Kumamoto-ken, 861-5522; Japan
- Coordinates: 32°51′17″N 130°42′00″E
- Operator: JR Kyushu
- Line: ■ Kagoshima Main Line,
- Distance: 188.8 km from Mojikō
- Platforms: 2 side platforms
- Tracks: 2

Construction
- Structure type: At grade
- Accessible: No - platforms linked by footbridge

Other information
- Status: Unstaffed
- Website: Official website

History
- Opened: 1 October 1943

Passengers
- FY2020: 518 daily
- Rank: 213th (among JR Kyushu stations)

Services
Preceding station	JR Kyushu	Following station
Sōjōdaigakumae towards Kagoshima	Kagoshima Main Line	Ueki towards Mojikō
Location
- Location within Kumamoto Prefecture Location within Japan

Nishisato Station (西里駅, Nishisato-eki) is a passenger railway station located in the Kita-ku ward of the city of Kumamoto, Kumamoto Prefecture, Japan. It is operated by JR Kyushu.

== Lines ==
The station is served by the Kagoshima Main Line and is located 188.8 km from the starting point of the line at Mojiko.

== Layout ==
The station consists of two side platforms serving two tracks at grade. There is no station building, only shelters on both platforms for waiting passengers. Automatic ticket machines are provided. The platforms are linked by a footbridge.

=== Platforms ===
1	■ ■ Kagoshima Main Line	for Tamana, Ōmuta and Tosu
2	■ ■ Kagoshima Main Line	for Kumamoto and Yatsushiro

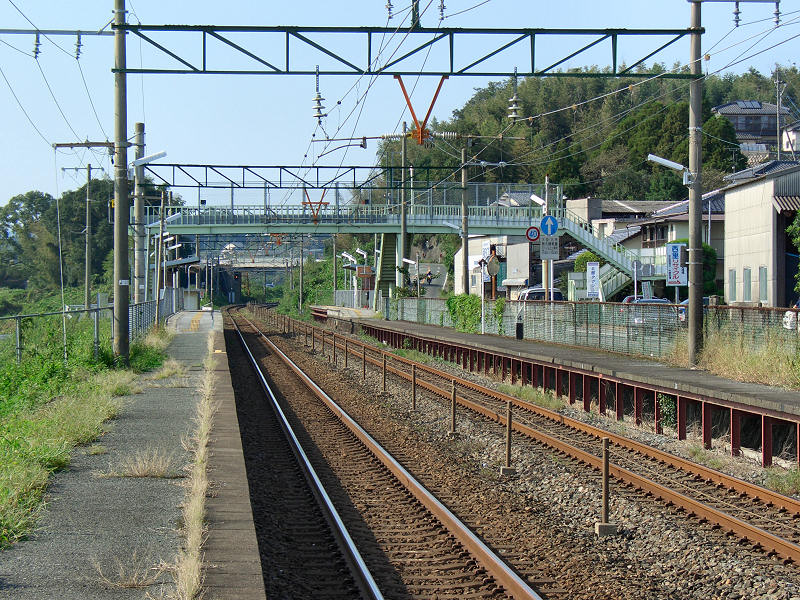
A view of the platforms and tracks.

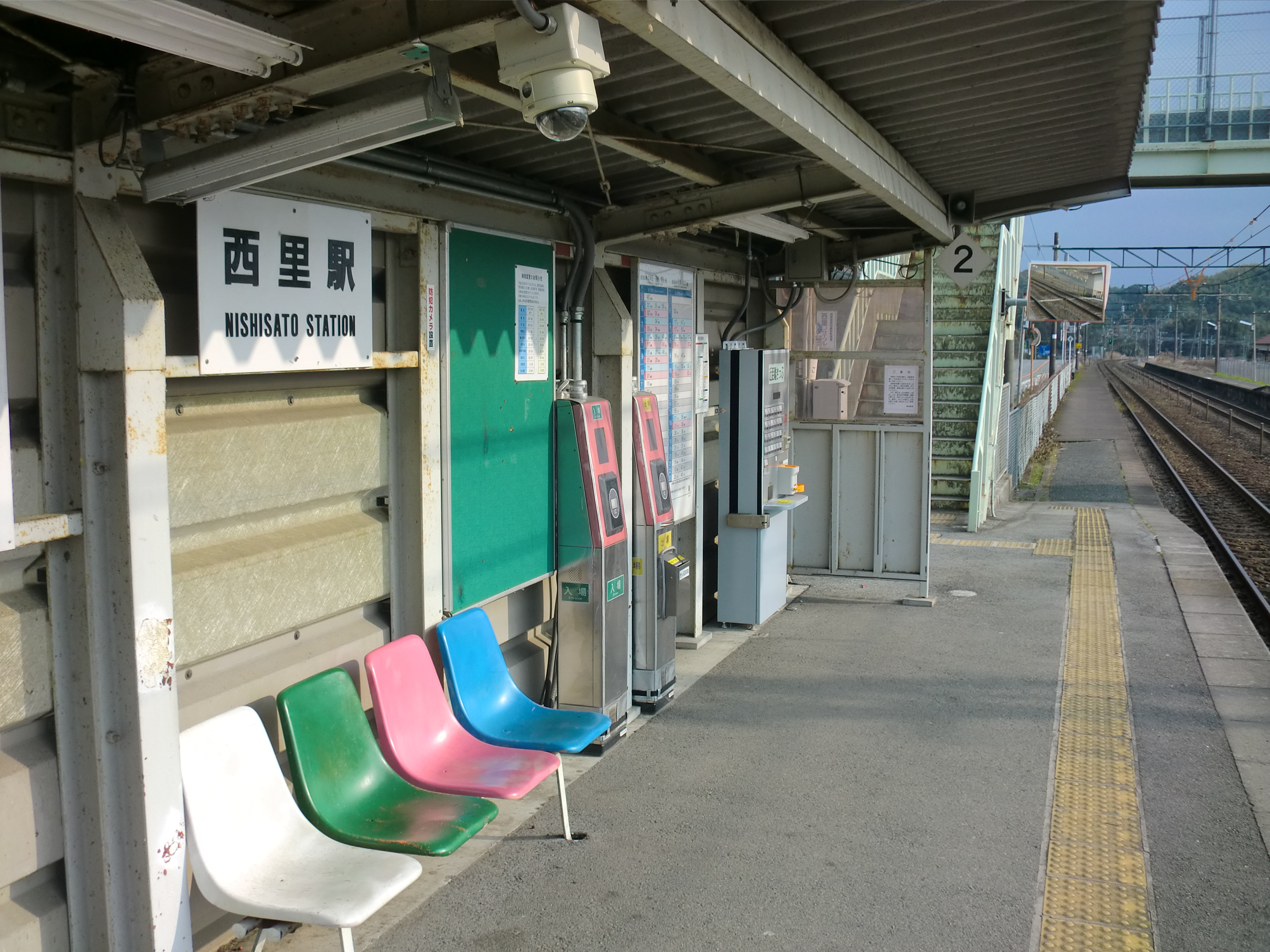
Platform

== History ==
Japanese Government Railways (JGR) opened Nishisato Signal Box (西里信号場) on 1 October 1943 on the existing track of the Kagoshima Main Line. On 10 December 1954, Japanese National Railways (JNR), the postwar successor of JGR, upgrade the facility to a full station. With the privatization of JNR on 1 April 1987, JR Kyushu took over control of the station.

== Passenger statistics ==
In fiscal 2020, the station was used by an average of 518 passengers daily (boarding passengers only), and it ranked 213th among the busiest stations of JR Kyushu.

== Surrounding area ==
- Kumamoto Health Science University
- Kumamoto City Nishizato Elementary School

== See also ==
- List of railway stations in Japan
