= Nagasu Station =

Railway station in Nagasu, Kumamoto Prefecture, Japan

Nagasu Station 長洲駅
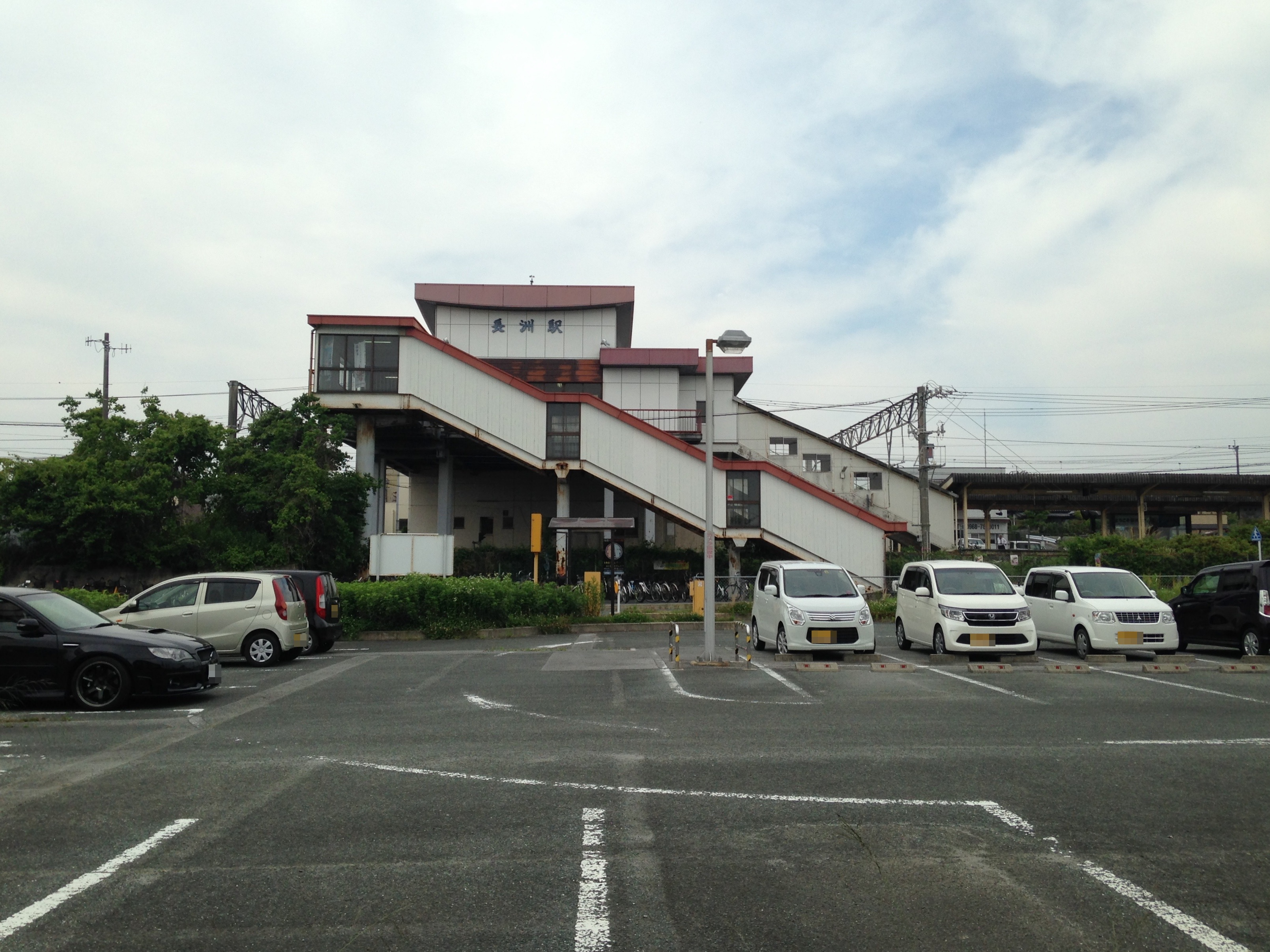
- The south entrance of Nagasu Station in 2016

General information
- Location: Takahama, Nagasu-machi, Tamana-gun, Kumamoto-ken 869-0121; Japan
- Coordinates: 32°56′07″N 130°27′21″E
- Operator: JR Kyushu
- Line: ■ Kagoshima Main Line,
- Distance: 159.4 km from Mojikō
- Platforms: 1 side + 1 island platforms
- Tracks: 3
- Connections: Bus stop

Construction
- Structure type: At grade
- Parking: Available
- Cycle facilities: Designated parking area for bikes
- Accessible: No - steps to station and from station to platforms

Other information
- Status: Staffed ticket window (Midori no Madoguchi) (outsourced)
- Website: Official website

History
- Opened: 1 April 1891

Passengers
- FY2020: 525 daily
- Rank: 211th (among JR Kyushu stations)

Services
Preceding station	JR Kyushu	Following station
Ōnoshimo towards Kagoshima	Kagoshima Main Line	Minami-Arao towards Mojikō
Location
- Location within Kumamoto Prefecture Location within Japan

Nagasu Station (長洲駅, Nagasu-eki) is a railway station located in the town of Nagasu, Kumamoto Prefecture, Japan. It is operated by JR Kyushu.

== Lines ==
The station is served by the Kagoshima Main Line and is located 159.4 km from the starting point of the line at Mojiko. Both local and rapid services on the line stop at the station.

== Layout ==
The station consists of a side platform and an island platform serving three tracks. The station building is a hashigami structure with the various station facilities such as the ticket window, waiting area and ticket gates located on a bridge which spans the tracks. The bridge has entrances on both the south and north side of the tracks. Access to the facilities on the bridge and from the bridge to the platforms is by means of various flights of steps.

Management of the station has been outsourced to the JR Kyushu Tetsudou Eigyou Co., a wholly owned subsidiary of JR Kyushu specialising in station services. It staffs the ticket counter which is equipped with a Midori no Madoguchi facility.

=== Platforms ===
1, 2	■ ■ Kagoshima Main Line	for Tamana and Kumamoto
2, 3	■ ■ Kagoshima Main Line	for Ōmuta, Kurume and Tosu

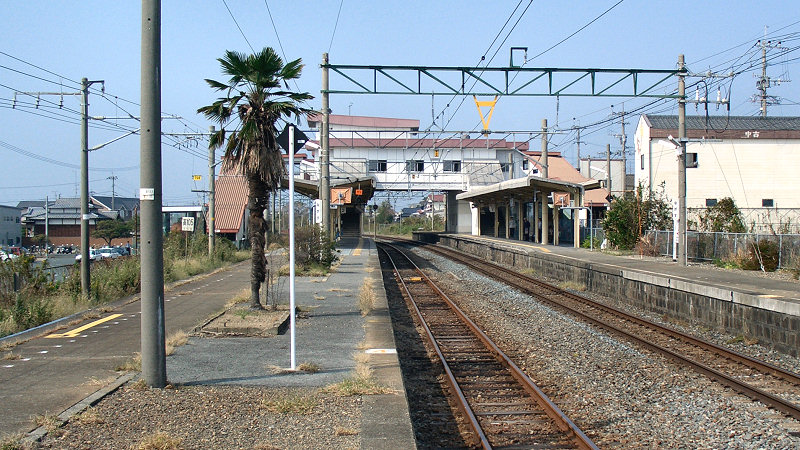
A view of the station platforms. Note the bridge where the ticket window and waiting area is located.

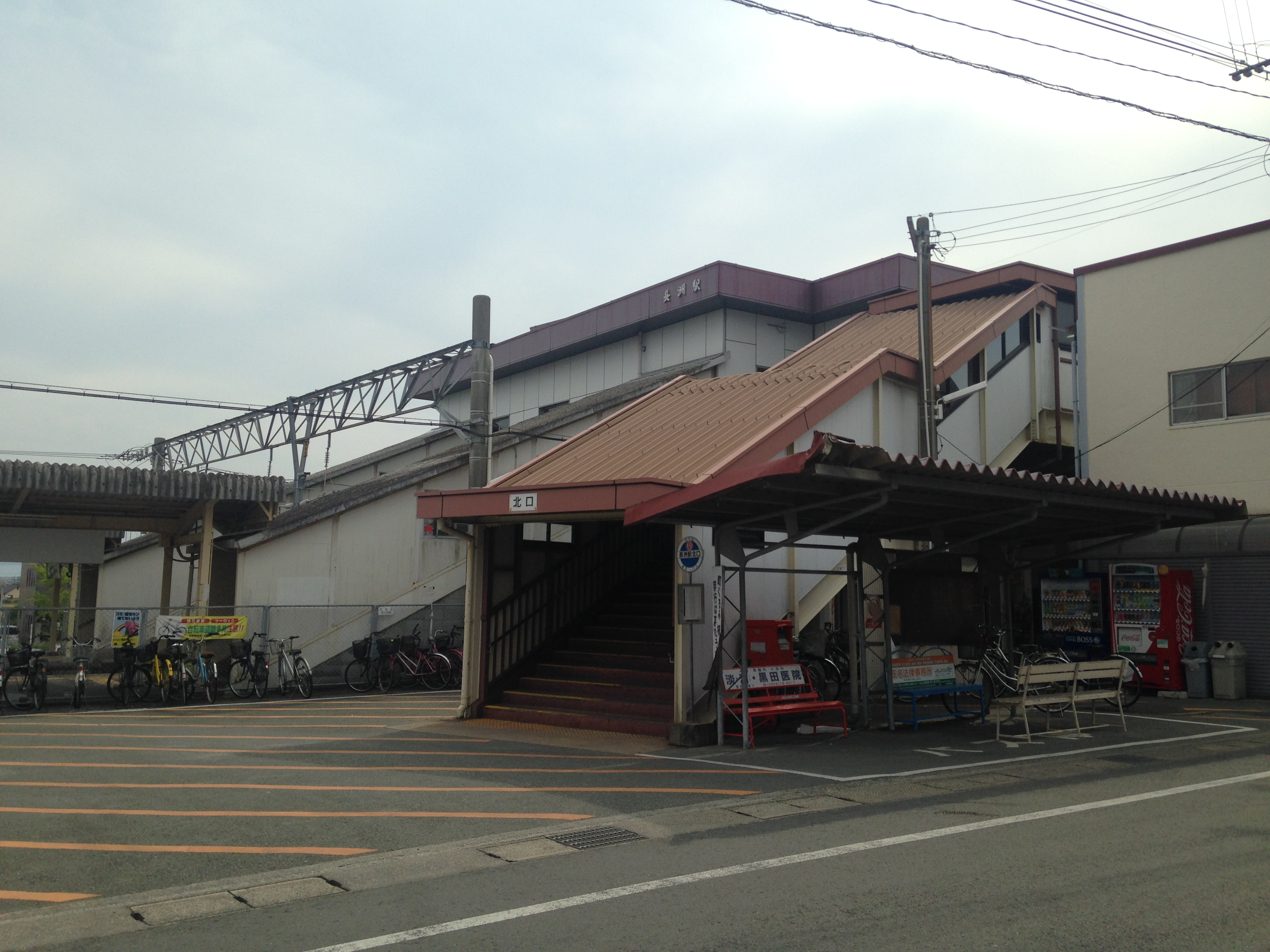
The north entrance of the station. There is a bus stop at the station entrance.

== History ==
The privately run Kyushu Railway had opened a stretch of track between Hakata and the (now closed) Chitosegawa temporary stop on 11 December 1889. After several phases of expansion northwards and southwards, by February 1891, the line stretched from Kurosaki south to Kurume. In the next phase of expansion, the track was extended south to Takase (now Tamana) opening as the new southern terminus on 1 April 1891. Nagasu was opened on the same day as one of several intermediate stations on the new stretch of track. When the Kyushu Railway was nationalized on 1 July 1907, Japanese Government Railways (JGR) took over control of the station. On 12 October 1909, the station became part of the Hitoyoshi Main Line and then on 21 November 1909, part of the Kagoshima Main Line. With the privatization of Japanese National Railways (JNR), the successor of JGR, on 1 April 1987, JR Kyushu took over control of the station.

== Passenger statistics ==
In fiscal 2020, the station was used by an average of 525 passengers daily (boarding passengers only), and it ranked 211th among the busiest stations of JR Kyushu.

== Surrounding area ==
- Nagasu Town Kiyosato Elementary School
- Nagasu Town Hall

== See also ==
- List of railway stations in Japan
