= Tabaruzaka Station =

Railway station in Kumamoto, Japan

Tabaruzaka Station 田原坂駅
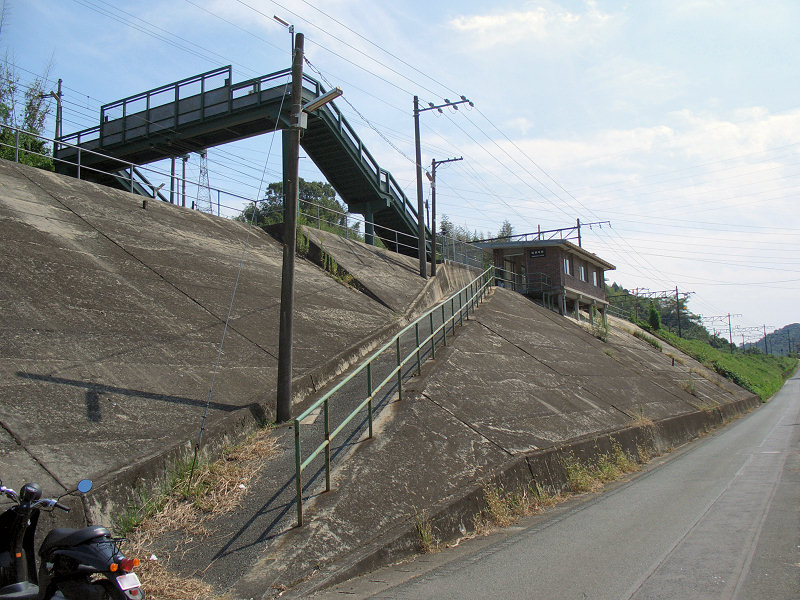
- Tabaruzaka Station in 2006

General information
- Location: Uekimachitodoroki, Kita-ku, Kumamoto-shi, Kumamoto-ken, 861-0155; Japan
- Coordinates: 32°53′59″N 130°39′12″E
- Operator: JR Kyushu
- Line: ■ Kagoshima Main Line,
- Distance: 180.2 km from Mojikō
- Platforms: 2 side platforms
- Tracks: 2

Construction
- Structure type: Side hill cutting
- Accessible: No - platform accessed by footbridge, steep slope to station

Other information
- Status: Unstaffed
- Website: Official website

History
- Opened: 1 October 1943

Passengers
- FY2014: 24 daily

Services
Preceding station	JR Kyushu	Following station
Ueki towards Kagoshima	Kagoshima Main Line	Konoha towards Mojikō
Location
- Location within Kumamoto Prefecture Location within Japan

Tabaruzaka Station (田原坂駅, Tabaruzaka-eki) is a passenger railway station located in the Kita-ku ward of the city of Kumamoto, Kumamoto Prefecture, Japan. It is operated by JR Kyushu.

== Lines ==
The station is served by the Kagoshima Main Line and is located 180.2 km from the starting point of the line at Mojiko.

== Layout ==
The station consists of two side platforms serving two tracks on a side hill cutting. A steep sloping ramp leads up to the station from the access road. The station building is a simple, functional, brick structure which is unstaffed and serves only as a waiting room. Access to the opposite side platform is by means of a footbridge.

=== Platforms ===
1	■ ■ Kagoshima Main Line	for Tamana, Ōmuta and Tosu
2	■ ■ Kagoshima Main Line	for Kumamoto and Yatsushiro

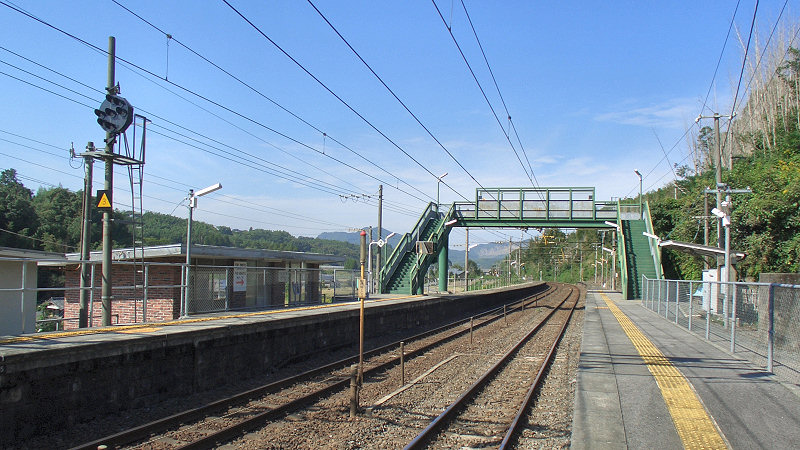
A view of the platforms and tracks.

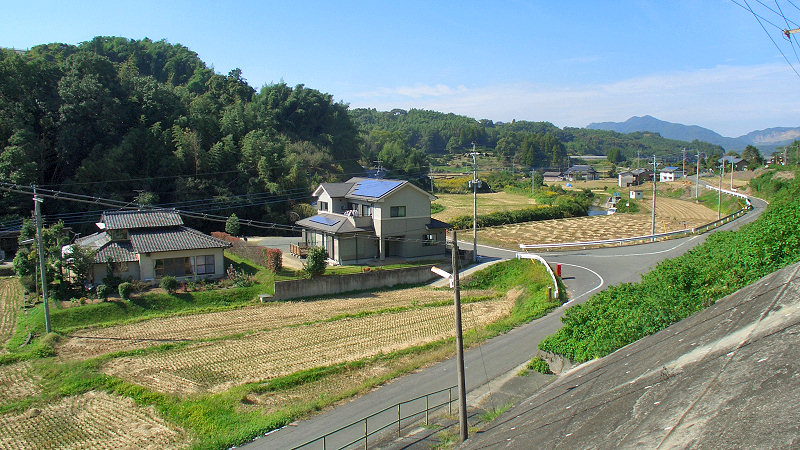
View from the station looking down onto the access road.

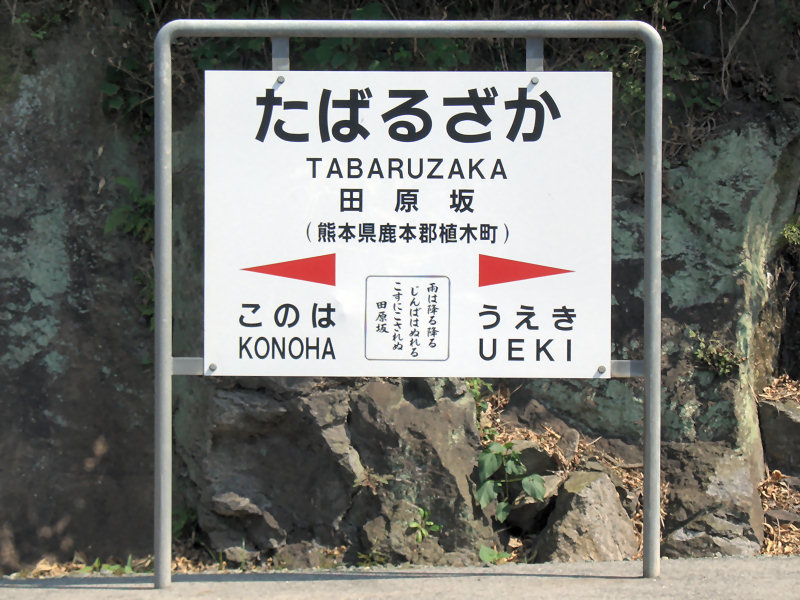
Signage

== History ==
Japanese Government Railways (JGR) opened Tabaruzaka signal box on 1 October 1943 on the existing track of the Kagoshima Main Line. On 1 October 1965, Japanese National Railways (JNR) upgraded the facility to full station. With the privatization of JNR on 1 April 1987, JR Kyushu took over control of the station.

== Passenger statistics ==
In fiscal 2014, the station was used by an average of 24 passengers daily (boarding passengers only).

== Surrounding area ==
The area around the station is surrounded by hills and covered with fields and orchards, but there are settlements scattered on the hills to the east, leading to the Ueki city area. About 800 m to the east, there is the Sanko Bus Shichimoto stop, which connects the Kumamoto Sakuramachi Bus Terminal to Uekimachi.

== See also ==
- List of railway stations in Japan
