= Kumabe Clan Yakata =

Kumabe clan yakata ruins
- 隈部氏館跡
- Yamaga, Kumamoto Japan
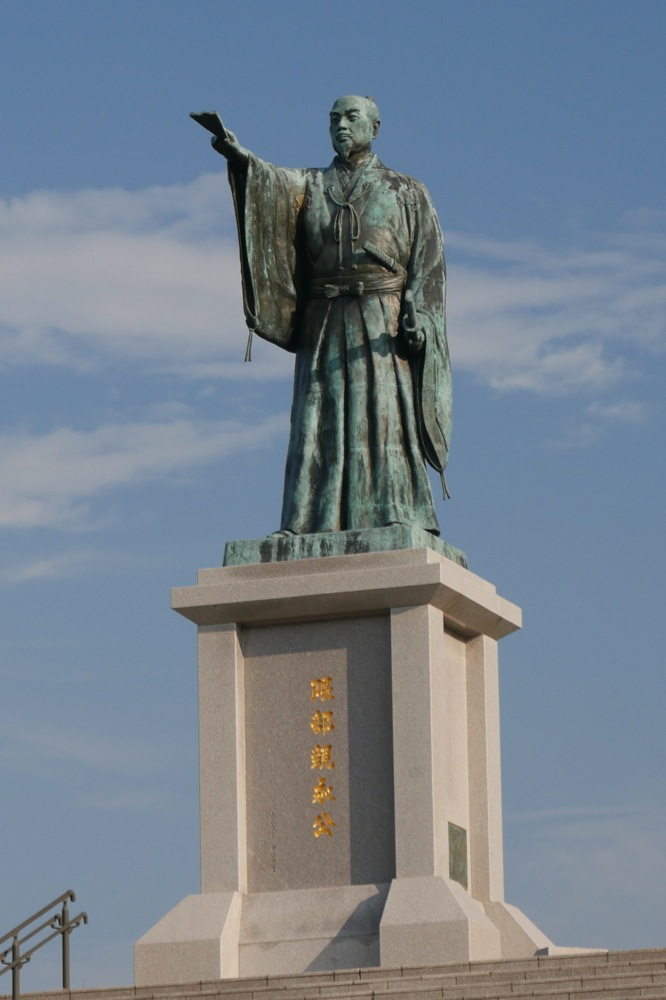
- Kumabe Chikanaga

Site information
- Type: fortified manor
- Controlled by: Kumabe clan
- Open to the public: yes
- Condition: Archaeological and designated national historical site; castle ruins

Location
- Coordinates: 33°03′31″N 130°47′49″E

Site history
- In use: Sengoku period
- National Historic Site of Japan

Kumabe clan yakata ruins (隈部氏館跡, Kumabe-shi yakata ato) is the site of a Sengoku period fortified manor located in the present-day Furushiro-cho neighborhood of the city of Yamaga, Kumamoto Prefecture, Japan. Its ruins have been protected as a National Historic Site since 2013. It is also called Nagano Castle (永野城跡).

== The Kumabe clan ==
The Kumabe clan were local warlords of Higo Province who ruled the Yamaga area. Kumabe Mochinao, who claimed to be a descendant of Uno Chikaharu of the Yamato Genji clan, led his clan down to Higo Province, where he was accepted by the Kikuchi clan and given estates in what is now present-day Kikuka Town, Yamaga City, Kumamoto Prefecture). He and his descendants served as senior vassals of the Kikuchi clan along with the Akaboshi clan and the Shiro clan. In 1264, the clan was given the surname of "Kumabe" and in the Nanboku-chō period assisted the Kikuchi clan in the battles supporting the Southern Court against the Ashikaga shogunate. When the Ōtomo clan, the shugo of Bungo Province overthrew the Kikuchi, the Kumabe transferred their fealty to the Ōtomo. In 1559, under Kumabe Chikanaga, they defeated Akaboshi Chikaie at the Battle of Gassegawa. In 1578, when the Ōtomo were defeated by the Shimazu clan, the Kumabe transferred their fealty to the Ryūzōji clan of Hizen Province. The Ryūzōji assisted the Kumabe in conquering the Akaboshi clan, and the Kumabe thus dominated all of northern Higo. However, in 1584, the Shimazu attacked again, and the Kumabe were forced to sue for peace, losing approximately half their territory. In 1587, during Toyotomi Hideyoshi's conquest of Kyushu, the Kumabe quickly defected from the Shimazu to the Toyotomi and were granted their existing territory. Hideyoshi placed Higo Province under his general, Sassa Narimasa, whose oppressive policies quickly led to a local rebellion. Kumabe Chikanaga and his son, Kumabe Chikanayasu, were the center of this revolt, and defeated Sassa's forces and swarmed into Kumamoto Castle as the uprising spread to all parts of Higo Province. Hideyoshi responded with severity and sent an army to replace Sassa and to defeat the rebels. The entire Kumabe clan was captured and killed, and the Kumabe line became extinct.

== Kumabe clan residence ruins ==
The site of the Kumabe clan's fortified residence is located on the southwestern slope of the Yahogatake mountain range at an elevation of 340 meters near the border of Chikugo and Bungo Provinces. In 1587 this was the stronghold of Kumabe Chikanaga. The remains consist of a main enclosure, with two moats on the rear side, a group of small terraces on the western slope, a large moat under the southwestern edge of the front of the building, and two sections in front of the building. In the main enclosure, which had a stone-built square gate at the entrance, the foundation stones of three buildings, a rain gutter, a circular stonework that is thought to be the remains of a hearth, and garden remains have been confirmed. The buildings found are believed to be the main hall, a meeting hall with a garden, and buildings for a storehouse and kitchen. The garden ruins, with the distant mountains in the background, start with a pointed standing stone at the top of the waterfall rock formation, and are constructed with stones gradually lowering in height at key points to match the terrain of the hill behind it which slopes south. The existence of these has been known since ancient times and was recorded in books from the Edo period, but archaeological excavations conducted in 1974-76 confirmed that various remains have been well preserved. The castle ruins are surrounded by steep valleys on both sides, and the whole of Yamaga city can be viewed to the south. There are stone walls and earthworks all over the mountainside that descends to Kaminagano hamlet south of the Kumabe Yakata ruins, and it is believed that the Kumabe clan and their retainers built their houses in the surrounding area. The site is considered valuable for learning about the state of residences of local feudal lords during the Sengoku period, and were designated a national historic site in 2009. The site is about 30 minutes by car from Kumamoto Station on the JR Kyushu Kagoshima Main Line.

== See also ==
- List of Historic Sites of Japan (Kumamoto)
