= Nabeta Cave Tombs =

Archaeological site in Japan

- 鍋田横穴 (Japanese)
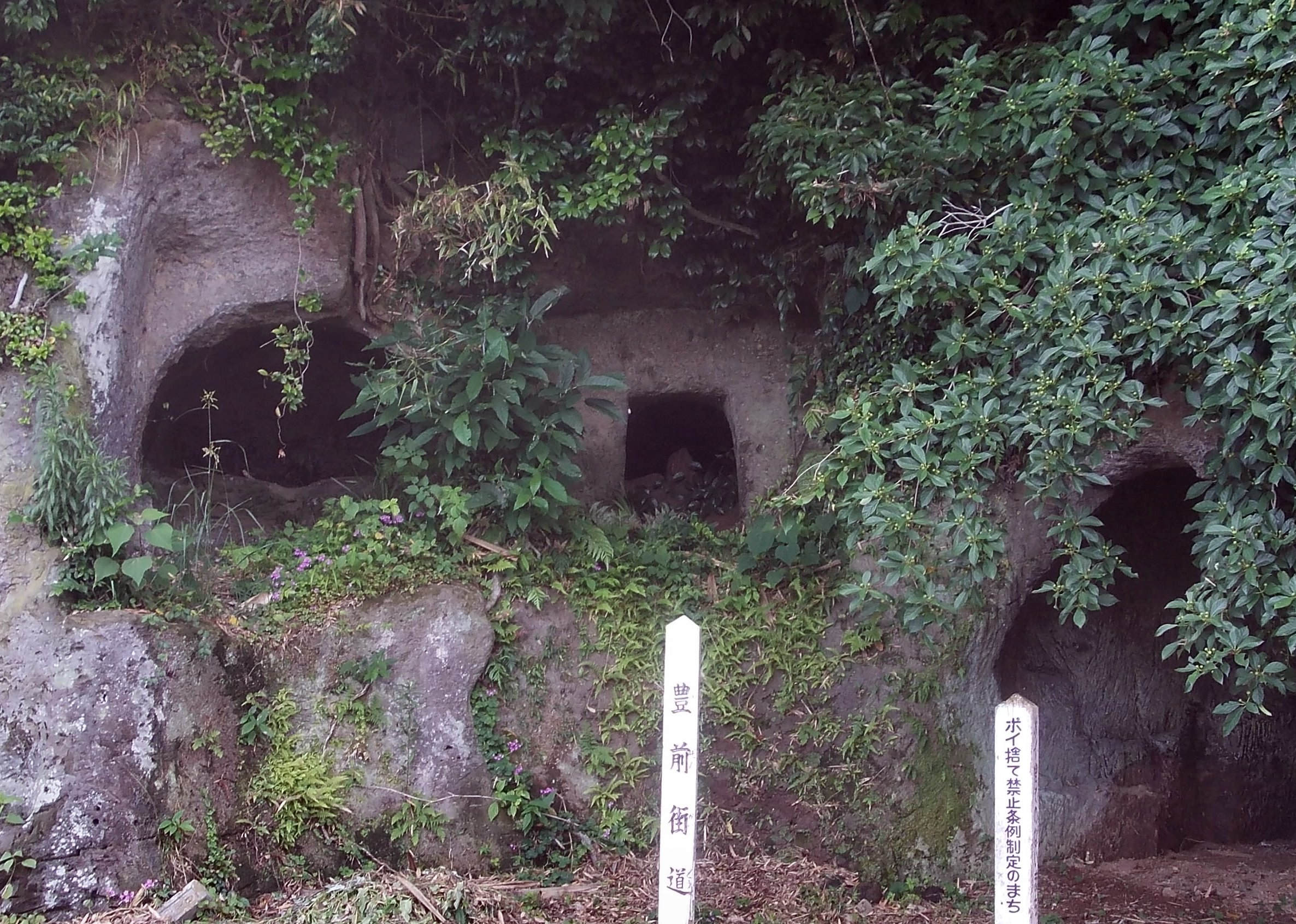
- Nabeta Cave Tombs

- Nakata Cave Tombs Nabeta Cave Tombs (Japan)
- Interactive map of Nabeta Cave Tombs
- 33°01′13″N 130°40′16″E
- Type: Yokoanabo cluster
- Periods: Kofun period
- Location: Yamaga, Kumamoto, Japan
- Region: Kyushu

History
- Built: late 6th century AD

Site notes
- Public access: No

The Nabeta Cave Tombs (鍋田横穴, Nabeta yokoaka) is an archaeological site containing a cluster of late Kofun period yokoanabo located in what is now part of the city of Yamaga, Kumamoto, Japan. It is significant in that many of these tombs are decorated kofun with geometric and figurative patterns painted in red on the walls of the burial chamber. The site was designated a National Historic Site of Japan in 1922.

== Overview ==
The Nabeta Cave Tombs are located on a 500-meter stretch of cliffs of Aso tuff on the west bank of the Iwano River, a tributary of the Kikuchi River, in northern Kumamoto Prefecture. A total of 61 cave tombs have been identified, of which 16 are decorated. Tomb No. 27 is particularly noteworthy, with a double decorative border, a rectangular tomb chamber 2 meters deep and 2.5 meters wide, and a flat floor. On the left outer wall are a figure with arms and legs outstretched, a sword, a bow, an octopus-shaped quiver with six arrowheads, a knives, and a small bow with arrows nocked, and a shield. Beneath the large and small quivers is a horse carved in relief with its head facing the passage. There are many other cave groups scattered throughout Yamaga city, such as the Nagaiwa Cave Tombs and the Shiro Cave Tombs. Currently, the surrounding area has been developed as Nabeta Recreation Forest Park.

== See also ==
- List of Historic Sites of Japan (Kumamoto)
- Decorated kofun
