= Ōnoshimo Station =

Railway station in Tamana, Kumamoto Prefecture, Japan

Ōnoshimo Station 大野下駅
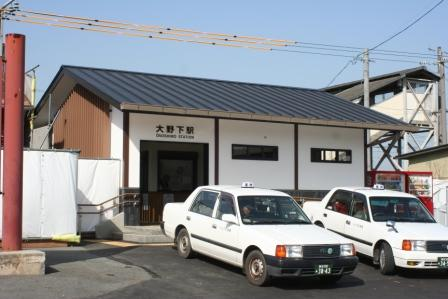
- Ōnoshimo Station in 2010

General information
- Location: Taimeimachi Onoshimo, Tamana-shi, Kumamoto-ken 869-0224; Japan
- Coordinates: 32°55′18″N 130°30′07″E
- Operator: JR Kyushu
- Line: ■ Kagoshima Main Line,
- Distance: 164.1 km from Mojikō
- Platforms: 2 side platforms
- Tracks: 2 tracks

Construction
- Structure type: At grade
- Accessible: No - platforms linked by footbridge

Other information
- Status: Kan'i itaku ticket window
- Website: Official website

History
- Opened: 28 November 1928

Passengers
- FY2020: 266 daily
- Rank: 288th (among JR Kyushu stations)

Services
Preceding station	JR Kyushu	Following station
Tamana towards Kagoshima	Kagoshima Main Line	Nagasu towards Mojikō
Location
- Location within Kumamoto Prefecture Location within Japan

Ōnoshimo Station (大野下駅, Ōnoshimo-eki) is a railway station located in the city of Tamana, Kumamoto Prefecture, Japan. It is operated by JR Kyushu.

== Lines ==
The station is served by the Kagoshima Main Line and is located 164.1 km from the starting point of the line at Mojikō. Local and rapid services on the line stop at the station.

== Layout ==
The station consists of two side platforms serving two tracks. The station building is a modern concrete structure which houses a ticket window and a waiting room. There is also an exhibition area featuring artefacts, pictures and part of the roof of the old station building. The roof exhibit has bullet marks caused by a strafing run against the station by a U.S. Lockheed P-38 Lightning fighter during the Second World War. Access to the opposite side platform is by means of a footbridge. The station is not staffed by JR but some types of tickets are available from a kan'i itaku agent who staffs the ticket window.

=== Platforms ===
1	■ ■ Kagoshima Main Line	for Ōmuta, Kurume and Tosu
2	■ ■ Kagoshima Main Line	for Tamana and Kumamoto

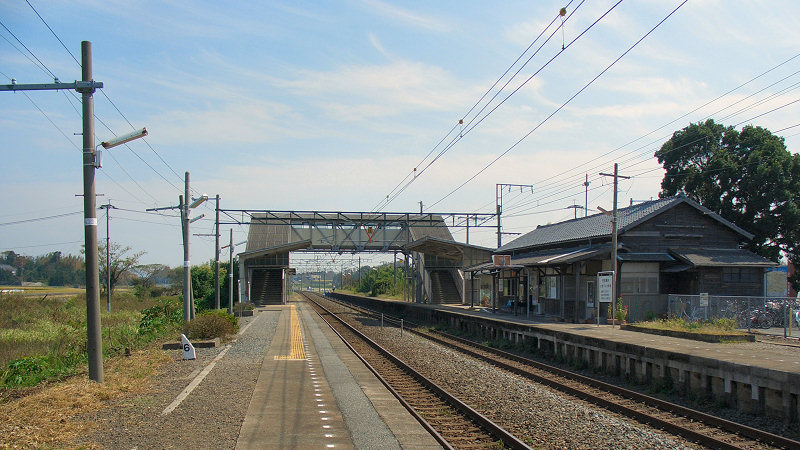
Platform

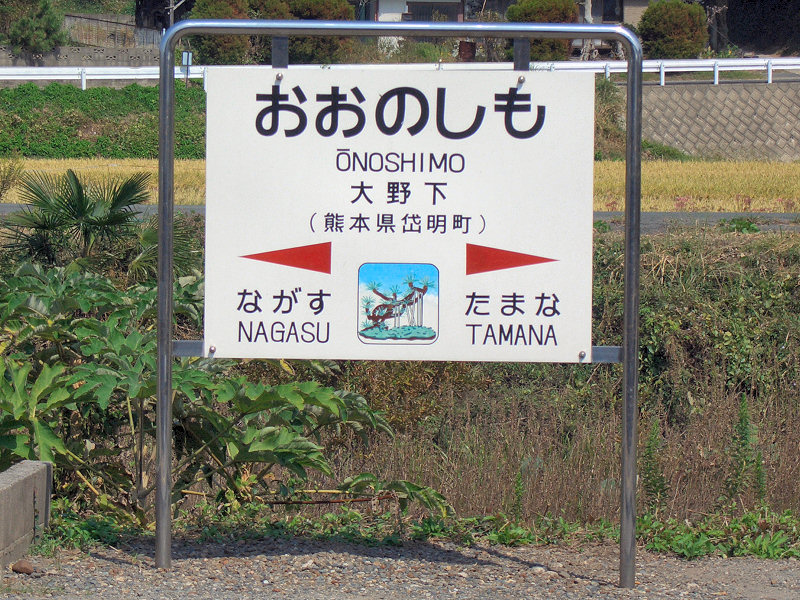
Signboard

== History ==
Japanese Government Railways (JGR) opened the station on 28 November 1928 as an additional station on the existing track of the Kagoshima Main Line. With the privatization of Japanese National Railways (JNR), the successor of JGR, on 1 April 1987, JR Kyushu took over control of the station.

== Passenger statistics ==
In fiscal 2020, the station was used by an average of 266 passengers daily (boarding passengers only), and it ranked 288th among the busiest stations of JR Kyushu.

== Surrounding area ==
- Ōnoshimo Post Office

== See also ==
- List of railway stations in Japan
