= Konoha Station =

Railway station in Gyokutō, Kumamoto Prefecture, Japan

Konoha Station 木葉駅
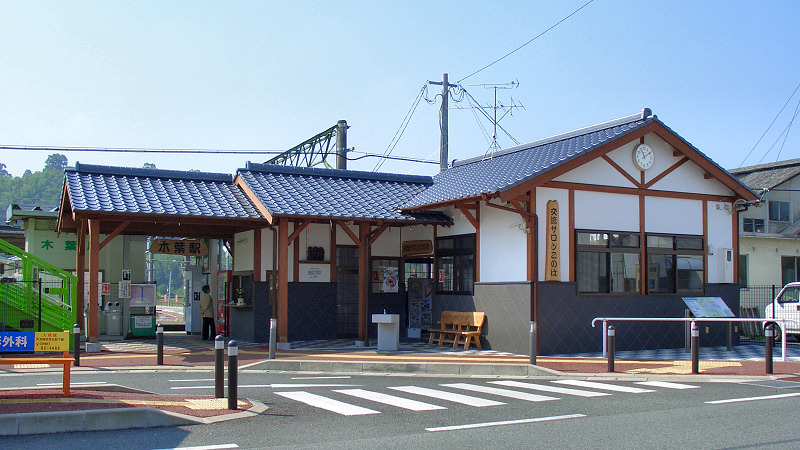
- Konoha Station in 2008

General information
- Location: Konoha, Gyokuto^machi, Tamana-gun, Kumamoto^ken 869-0303; Japan
- Coordinates: 32°55′00″N 130°37′35″E
- Operator: JR Kyushu
- Line: ■ Kagoshima Main Line,
- Distance: 176.7 km from Mojikō
- Platforms: 1 side + 1 island platforms
- Tracks: 3 + 1 siding

Construction
- Accessible: No - island platform accessed by footbridge

Other information
- Status: Kan'i itaku agent on site
- Website: Official website

History
- Opened: 1 April 1892

Passengers
- FY2020: 295 daily
- Rank: 277th (among JR Kyushu stations)

Services
Preceding station	JR Kyushu	Following station
Tabaruzaka towards Kagoshima	Kagoshima Main Line	Higo-Ikura towards Mojikō
Location
- Location within Kumamoto Prefecture Location within Japan

Konoha Station (木葉駅, Konoha-eki) is a passenger railway station located in the town of Gyokutō, Kumamoto Prefecture, Japan. It is operated by JR Kyushu.

== Lines ==
The station is served by the Kagoshima Main Line and is located 176.7 km (109.79 mi) from the starting point of the line at Mojiko.

== Layout ==
The station consists of a side platform and an island platform serving three tracks with a siding. The station building is a wooden structure in traditional Japanese style and serves as a local community interaction space. Access to the island platform is by means of a footbridge. The station is unstaffed by JR Kyushu but some types of tickets are available from a kan'i itaku agent on site who manages the ticket window.

=== Platforms ===
1	■ ■ Kagoshima Main Line	for Kumamoto and Yatsushiro
2	■ ■ Kagoshima Main Line	<siding>
3	■ ■ Kagoshima Main Line	for Tamana, Ōmuta and Tosu

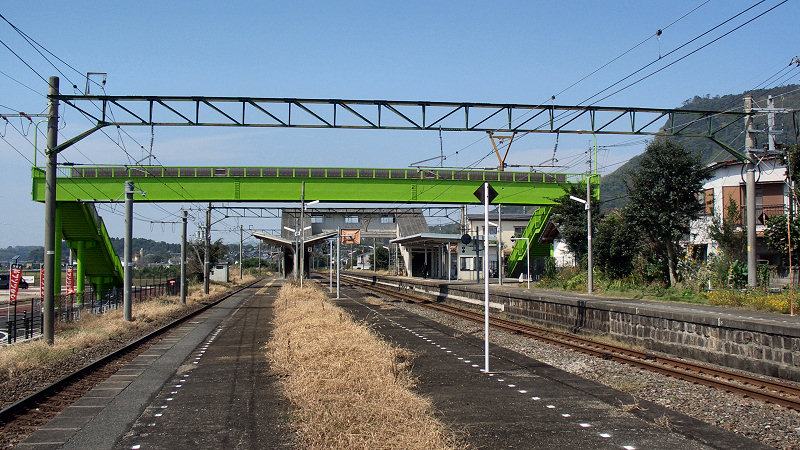
A view of the platforms and tracks.

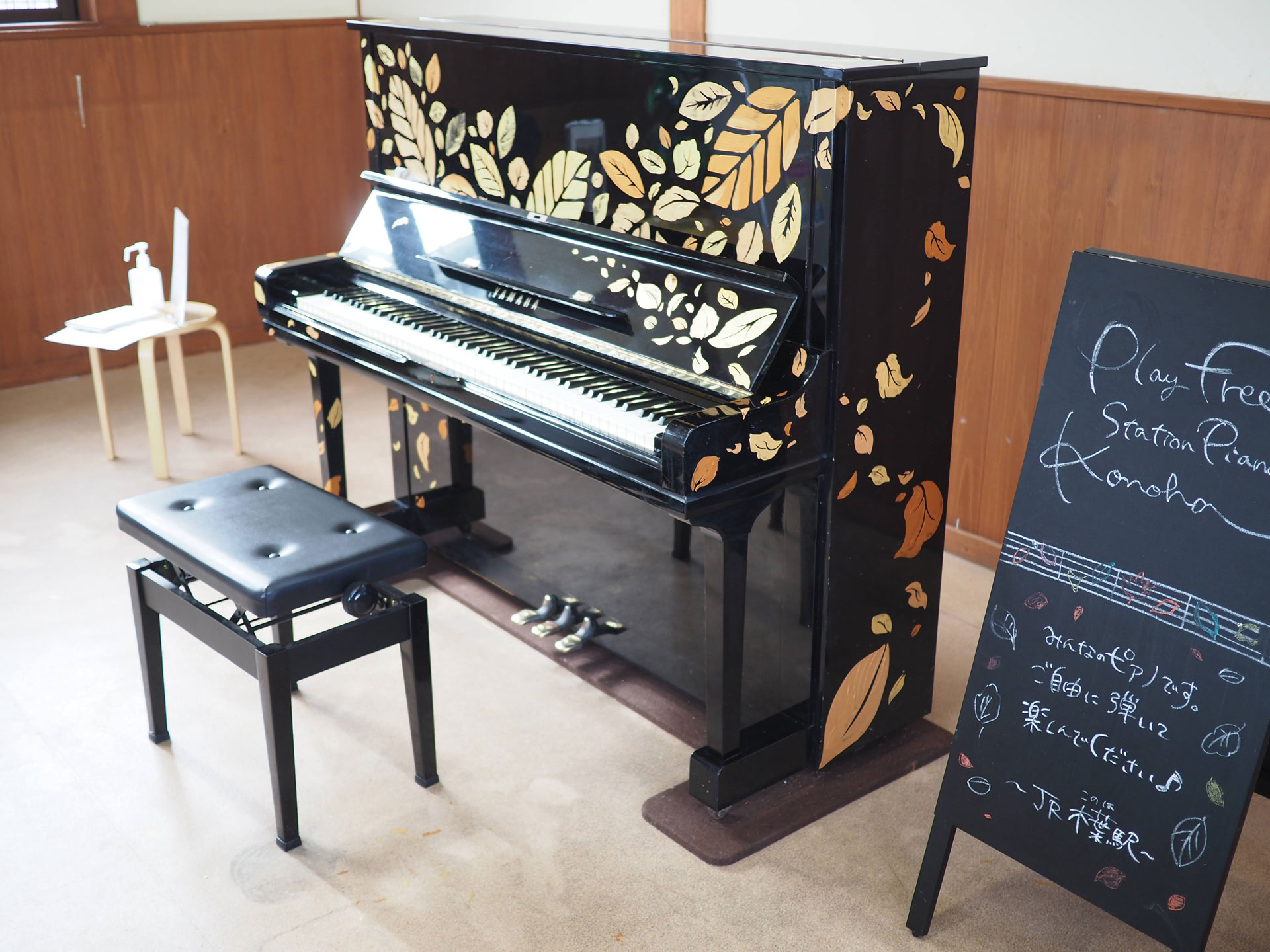
Station piano

== History ==
The privately run Kyushu Railway had opened a stretch of track between Hakata and the (now closed) Chitosegawa temporary stop on 11 December 1889. After several phases of expansion northwards and southwards, by July 1891, the line stretched from Kurosaki south to Kumamoto. Konoha was opened a few months later, on 1 April 1892, as an additional station on the track between Takase (now Tamana and Kumamoto. When the Kyushu Railway was nationalized on 1 July 1907, Japanese Government Railways (JGR) took over control of the station. On 12 October 1909, the station became part of the Hitoyoshi Main Line and then on 21 November 1909, part of the Kagoshima Main Line. With the privatization of Japanese National Railways (JNR), the successor of JGR, on 1 April 1987, JR Kyushu took over control of the station.

== Passenger statistics ==
In fiscal 2020, the station was used by an average of 295 passengers daily (boarding passengers only), and it ranked 277th among the busiest stations of JR Kyushu.

== Surrounding area ==
- Gyokuto Town Hall

== See also ==
- List of railway stations in Japan
