= Ueki Station =

Railway station in Kumamoto, Japan

Ueki Station 植木駅
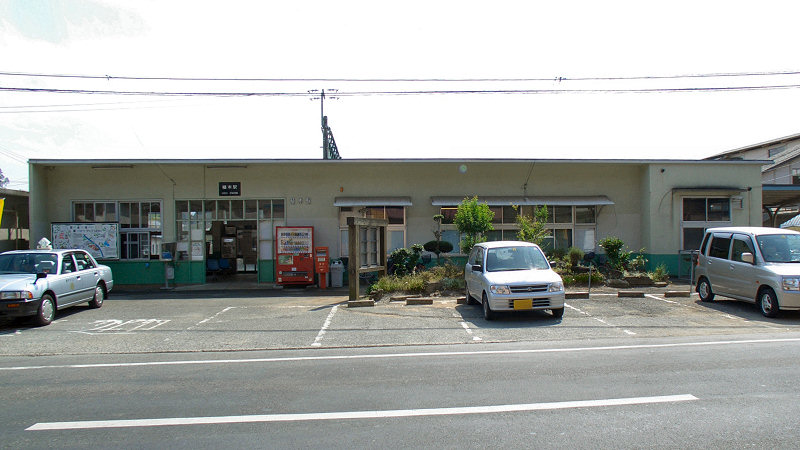
- Ueki Station in 2006

General information
- Location: Uekimachi Ogisako, Kita-ku, Kumamoto-shi, Kumamoto-ken, 861-0145; Japan
- Coordinates: 32°52′50″N 130°40′51″E
- Operator: JR Kyushu
- Line: ■ Kagoshima Main Line,
- Distance: 184.6 km from Mojikō
- Platforms: 1 side + 1 island platforms
- Tracks: 3 + 2 sidings

Construction
- Structure type: At grade
- Accessible: No - platform accessed by footbridge

Other information
- Status: Unstaffed
- Website: Official website

History
- Opened: 1 July 1891

Passengers
- FY2022: 456 daily
- Rank: 205th (among JR Kyushu stations)

Services
Preceding station	JR Kyushu	Following station
Nishisato towards Kagoshima	Kagoshima Main Line	Tabaruzaka towards Mojikō
Location
- Location within Kumamoto Prefecture Location within Japan

Ueki Station (植木駅, Ueki-eki) is a passenger railway station located in the Kita-ku ward of the city of Kumamoto, Kumamoto Prefecture, Japan. It is operated by JR Kyushu.

== Lines ==
The station is served by the Kagoshima Main Line and is located 184.6 km from the starting point of the line at Mojiko.

== Layout ==
The station consists of a side platform and an island platform serving three tracks at grade with two sidings branching off track 1. The station building is a simple, functional, concrete structure which serves to house a waiting room and automatic ticket vending machines. Access to the island platform is by means of a footbridge.

=== Platforms ===
1	■ ■ Kagoshima Main Line	for Tamana, Ōmuta and Tosu
2	■ ■ Kagoshima Main Line	(starting trains in both directions)
3	■ ■ Kagoshima Main Line	for Kumamoto and Yatsushiro

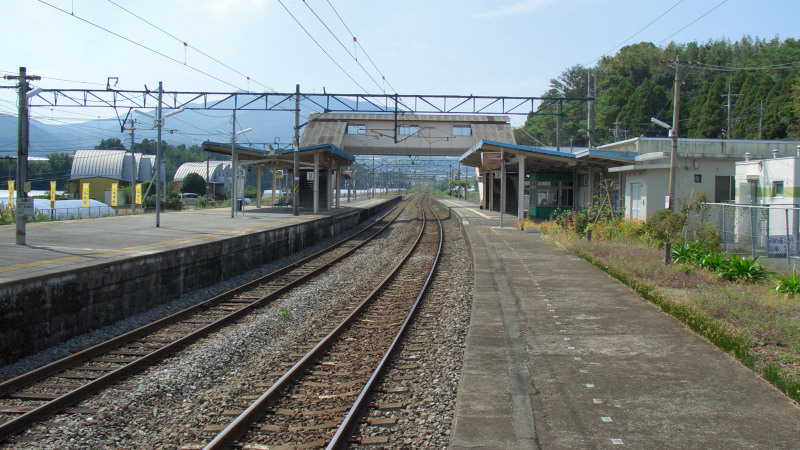
A view of the platforms and tracks.

== History ==
The privately run Kyushu Railway had opened a stretch of track between Hakata and the (now closed) Chitosegawa temporary stop on 11 December 1889. After several phases of expansion northwards and southwards, by April 1891, the line stretched from Kurosaki south to Takase )now Tamana. In the next phase of expansion, the track was extended south with Kumamoto opening as the new southern terminus on 1 July 1891. On the same day, Ueki was opened as an intermediate station along the new track. When the Kyushu Railway was nationalized on 1 July 1907, Japanese Government Railways (JGR) took over control of the station. On 12 October 1909, the station became part of the Hitoyoshi Main Line and then on 21 November 1909, part of the Kagoshima Main Line. With the privatization of Japanese National Railways (JNR), the successor of JGR, on 1 April 1987, JR Kyushu took over control of the station.

The station was earlier on equipped with a staffed ticket window but became unstaffed in 2015.

== Passenger statistics ==
In fiscal 2022, the station was used by an average of 1366 passengers daily (boarding passengers only).

== Surrounding area ==
- Tabaruzaka New Town
- Kumamoto City Hishigata Elementary School

== See also ==
- List of railway stations in Japan
