= Benkei-ga-ana Kofun =

- 弁慶ヶ穴古墳 (Japanese)
- Benkei-ga-ana Kofun Benkei-ga-ana Kofun (Japan)
- 33°01′33.6″N 130°41′9.1″E
- Type: Kofun
- Periods: Kofun period
- Location: Yamaga, Kumamoto, Japan
- Region: Kyushu

History
- Built: c.6th century

Site notes
- Public access: Yes (no facilities)
- National Historic Site of Japan

The Benkei-ga-ana Kofun (弁慶ヶ穴古墳) is a Kofun period burial mound, located in the Kumairi neighborhood of the city of Yamaga, Kumamoto Prefecture Japan. The tumulus was designated a National Historic Site of Japan in 1956.

== Overview ==
The Benkei-ga-ana Kofun is located at the western end of the Kumai-ri Plateau, about 1.2 kilometers north of the urban center of Yamaga City, next to the Yamaga City Yahata Elementary School. It is thought to be a zenpō-kōen-fun (前方後円墳), which is shaped like a keyhole, having one square end and one circular end, when viewed from above, built at the end of the late Kofun period; however, the anterior part of the tomb facing south west has almost disappeared, leaving only the posterior circular portion with a diameter of 15 meters and a height of 5.7 meters. The stone burial chamber is mad of huge stones of Mount Aso tuff, and consists of a horizontal passageway, an anterior chamber, and a posterior chamber. There is a relief of a human figure at the entrance to the burial chamber, and on the walls of the antechamber are geometric patterns that combine circles, diamonds, and triangles, as well as pictures of five horses and people, a boat with horses, birds, cargo and boats, and equestrian figures. The "cargo" in the boats is believed to be coffins, which has supported a theory that boat burials were practiced in Kofun period Japan, remnants of which has survived in the belief that the afterlife is beyond the sea.

Currently, viewing is strictly limited due to the severe fading of the colors, but a life-size model is on display at the Kumamoto Prefectural Decorated Tomb Museum. Excavated artifacts include tsuba (sword guards), beads, iron arrowheads, and gold rings.

== See also ==
- List of Historic Sites of Japan (Kumamoto)
- Decorated kofun
