= Katōda Higashibaru Site =

Yayoi period settlement trace in Yamaga, Kumamoto, Japan

- 方保田東原遺跡 (Japanese)
- Katōda Higashibaru Site Katōda Higashibaru Site (Japan)
- Interactive map of Katōda Higashibaru Site
- 32°59′53.4″N 130°43′4.2″E
- Periods: Yayoi period
- Location: Yamaga, Kumamoto, Japan
- Region: Kyushu

Site notes
- Public access: Yes (park)

The Katōda Higashibaru Site (方保田東原遺跡, Katōda Higashibaru iseki) is an archaeological site located in the Katōda neighborhood of the city of Yamaga, Kumamoto Prefecture, with the traces of a large Yayoi Period settlement. It was designated a National Historic Site in 1985.

== Overview ==
The Katōda Higashibaru Site is located on a plateau at an elevation of 35 meters between the Kikuchi River and its tributary, the Katōda River, in northern Kumamoto Prefecture. The ruins cover an area of at least 330 meters east- to-west and 300 meters north-to-south, or approximately 35 hectares, making it one of the largest settlement sites in Kumamoto Prefecture. the area under the National Historic Site protection is approximately 11 hectares. The ruins are that of a large moated settlement, dating from the late Yayoi period to the early Kofun period (2nd to 4th century AD), and the remnants of an eight-meter wide outer ditch have also been found. Per numerous archaeological excavations, the remains of over 100 pit dwellings, stone coffin graves, wooden coffin graves, and earth pit graves have been discovered. Excavated remains include many pieces of Yayoi pottery, as well as iron products such as iron arrowheads, knives, sickles, and iron axes, and copper products such as magatama-shaped bronzeware, copper arrowheads, and small imitation mirrors. Pottery brought from various parts of western Japan, such as the San'in and Kinki regions, has also been excavated, suggesting that the settlement prospered through trade as well.

Currently, part of the site has been developed as a grassy park, and the excavated items are stored and exhibited at the Yamaga City Museum and the Yamaga City Excavated Cultural Property Management Center. The artifacts from the site were collectively designated as a National Important Cultural Property in 2017.

== See also ==
- List of Historic Sites of Japan (Kumamoto)
