= Iwabaru Kofun cluster =

- 岩原古墳群 (Japanese)
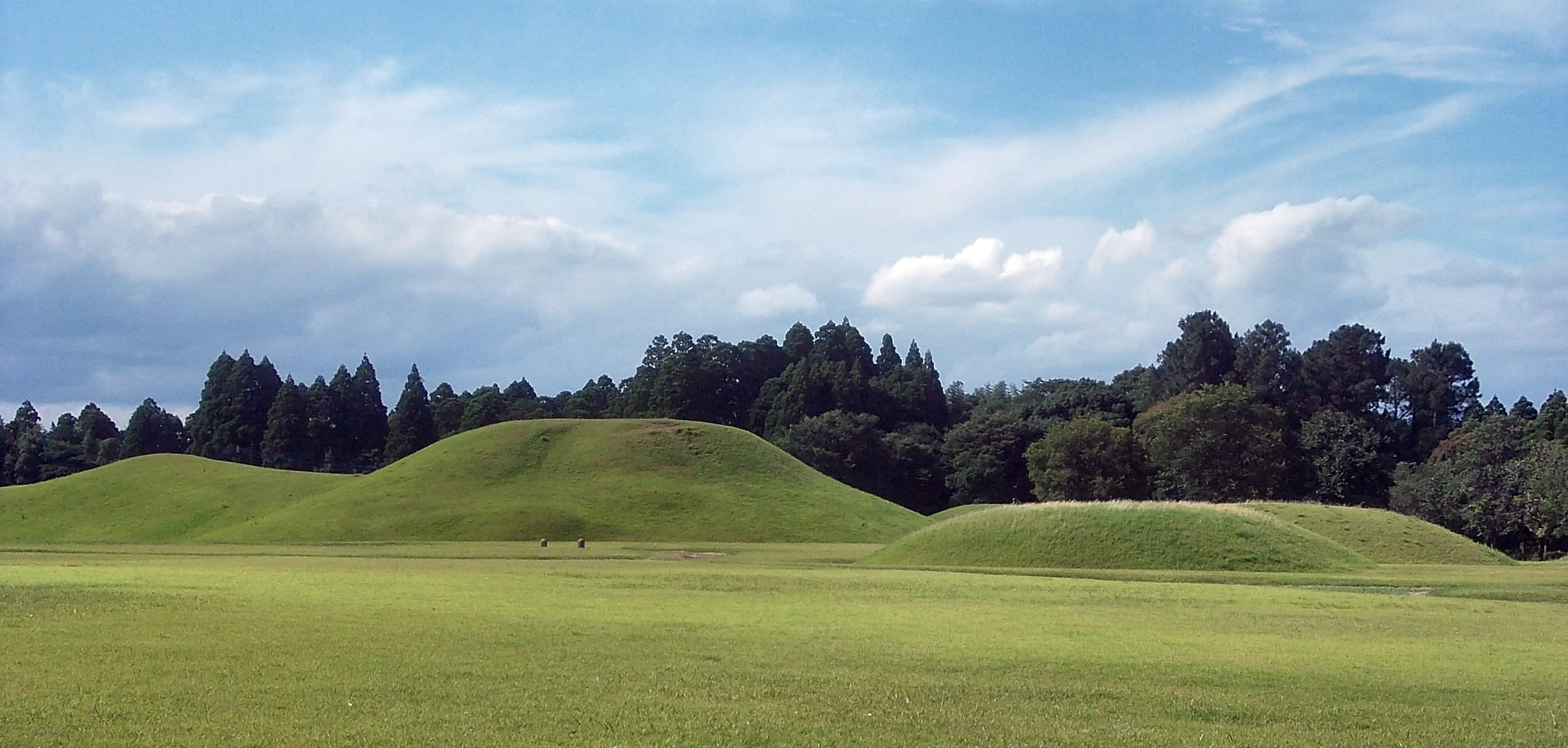
- Iwabaru Kofun

- Iwabaru Kofun cluster Iwabaru Kofun cluster (Japan)
- Interactive map of Iwabaru Kofun cluster
- 32°59′46″N 130°40′11″E
- Type: kofun
- Periods: Kofun period
- Location: Yamaga, Kumamoto, Japan
- Region: Kyushu

History
- Built: c. 5th to 6th century AD

Site notes
- Public access: No facilities

The Iwabaru Kofun cluster (岩原古墳群) is a group of Kofun period burial mounds located in the Kao-cho neighborhood of the city of Yamaga, Kumamoto Prefecture in Kyushu Japan. The tumulus group was collectively designated a National Historic Site of Japan in 1958, with the area under protection subsequently extended in 1999.

== Overview ==
The Iwabaru Kofun cluster is located on the Iwabaru Plateau, about 75 meters above sea level, on the left bank of the middle reaches of the Kikuchi River. This group of tumuli dates from the middle to late Kofun period and consists of the Futagozuka Kofun (双子塚古墳) and eight enpun (円墳)-style circular tombs with diameters of about 20 to 30 meters.

The Futagozuka Kofun is a zenpō-kōen-fun (前方後円墳), which are shaped like a keyhole, having one square end and one circular end, when viewed from above, orientated almost northwest. It has a main axis of about 107 meters long, a diameter of the circular rear part of about 57 meters, a width of the front rectangular portion of about 50 meters, and a height of about 9 meters. It is covered with fukiishi all over, is built in three tiers, and has traces of a surrounding moat. It is also called the "Iwabaru Kofun".

An additional tumulus was designated in 1965, when a house-shaped stone coffin was exposed during construction of a farm road. It is located about 150 meters south of Futagozuka Kofun and is estimated to be a circular tumulus with a diameter of a few dozen meters. The northern half of the mound was lost due to this work, and only the southern half remains today. Seven more circular tumuli have been confirmed since then. The Kumamoto Prefectural Decorated Tumulus Museum is located in one corner of the group of tombs.

== See also ==
- List of Historic Sites of Japan (Kumamoto)
