= Gyokutō, Kumamoto =

Gyokutō 玉東町
- Town
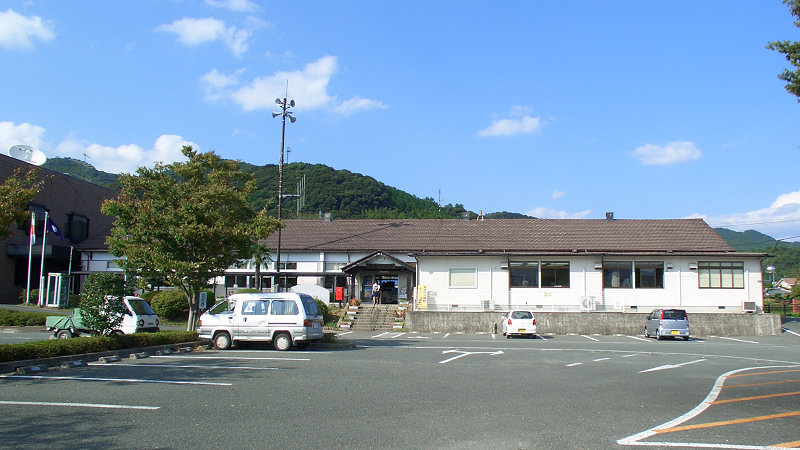
- Gyokuto Town Office

- Flag Chapter
- Interactive map of Gyokutō
- Location in Japan
- Coordinates: 32°55′08″N 130°37′43″E
- Country: Japan
- Region: Kyushu
- Prefecture: Kumamoto
- District: Tamana

Area
  - Total: 24.33 km^{2} (9.39 sq mi)

Population (July 31, 2023)
  - Total: 5,181
  - Density: 212.9/km^{2} (551.5/sq mi)
- Time zone: UTC+09:00 (JST)
- City hall address: 759 Konoha, Tamato-cho, Tamana-gun, Kumamoto-ken 869-0303
- Website: Official website
- Symbols
- Bird: Japanese bush warbler
- Flower: Mikan
- Tree: Ginkgo biloba

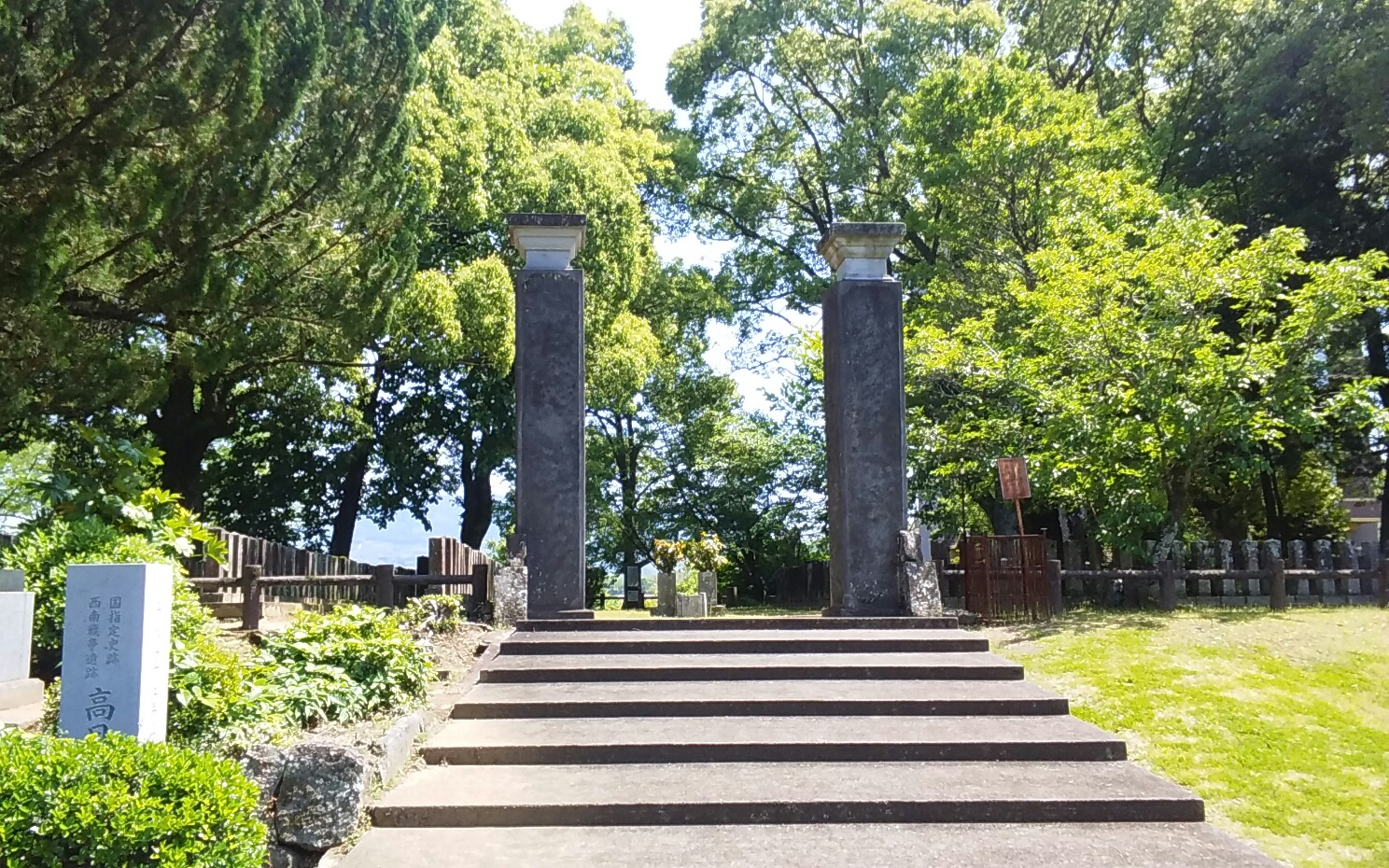
Takatsuki Kangun Cemetery

Gyokutō (玉東町, Gyokutō-machi) is a town located in Tamana District, Kumamoto Prefecture, Japan on the island of Kyushu. As of 31 July 2024, the town had an estimated population of 5,181 in 2113 households, and a population density of 210 persons per km^{2}. The total area of the town is 24.33 km^{2} (9.39 sq mi).

== Geography ==
Gyokutō is located in the northeastern inland area of Kumamoto Prefecture.

=== Surrounding municipalities ===
Kumamoto Prefecture

- Kumamoto
- Nagomi
- Tamana
- Yamaga

=== Climate ===
Gyokutō has a humid subtropical climate (Köppen Cfa) characterized by warm summers and cool winters with light to no snowfall. The average annual temperature in Gyokutō is 16.3 °C. The average annual rainfall is 1988 mm with September as the wettest month. The temperatures are highest on average in August, at around 26.9 °C, and lowest in January, at around 6.0 °C.

=== Demographics ===
Per Japanese census data, the population of Gyokutō is as shown below

Historical population
| Year | Pop. | ±% |
|---|---|---|
| 1940 | 5,782 | — |
| 1950 | 8,365 | +44.7% |
| 1960 | 7,403 | −11.5% |
| 1970 | 6,403 | −13.5% |
| 1980 | 6,315 | −1.4% |
| 1990 | 6,043 | −4.3% |
| 2000 | 5,781 | −4.3% |
| 2010 | 5,554 | −3.9% |
| 2020 | 5,045 | −9.2% |

== History ==
The area of Gyokutō was part of ancient Higo Province, During the Edo Period it was part of the holdings of Kumamoto Domain. After the Meiji restoration, the villages of Konoha and Yamakita were established with the creation of the modern municipalities system on April 1, 1889. The two villages merged on March 1, 1955, to form the village of Gyokutō, which was raised to town status on April 1, 1967.

== Government ==
Gyokutō has a mayor-council form of government with a directly elected mayor and a unicameral city council of 10 members. Gyokutō, collectively with the other municipalities of Tamana District, contributes one member to the Kumamoto Prefectural Assembly. In terms of national politics, the town is part of the Kumamoto 2nd district of the lower house of the Diet of Japan.

== Economy ==
The local economy is based on agriculture and horticulture, with mikan oranges and Japanese plums as the predominant crops.

== Education ==
Gyokutō has two public elementary schools and one public junior high school operated by the town government. The town does not have a high school.

== Transportation ==
=== Railways ===
JR Kyushu - Kagoshima Main Line

JA Konoha

=== Highways ===
- National Route 208

== Local attractions ==
The Hachiman shrine in the town celebrates an annual spring festival on 19 February and an annual autumn festival on 19 November, which involve sumo wrestling, horse chasing, and kagura ritual dances.
