= Higo-Ikura Station =

Railway station in Tamana, Kumamoto Prefecture, Japan

Higo-Ikura Station 肥後伊倉
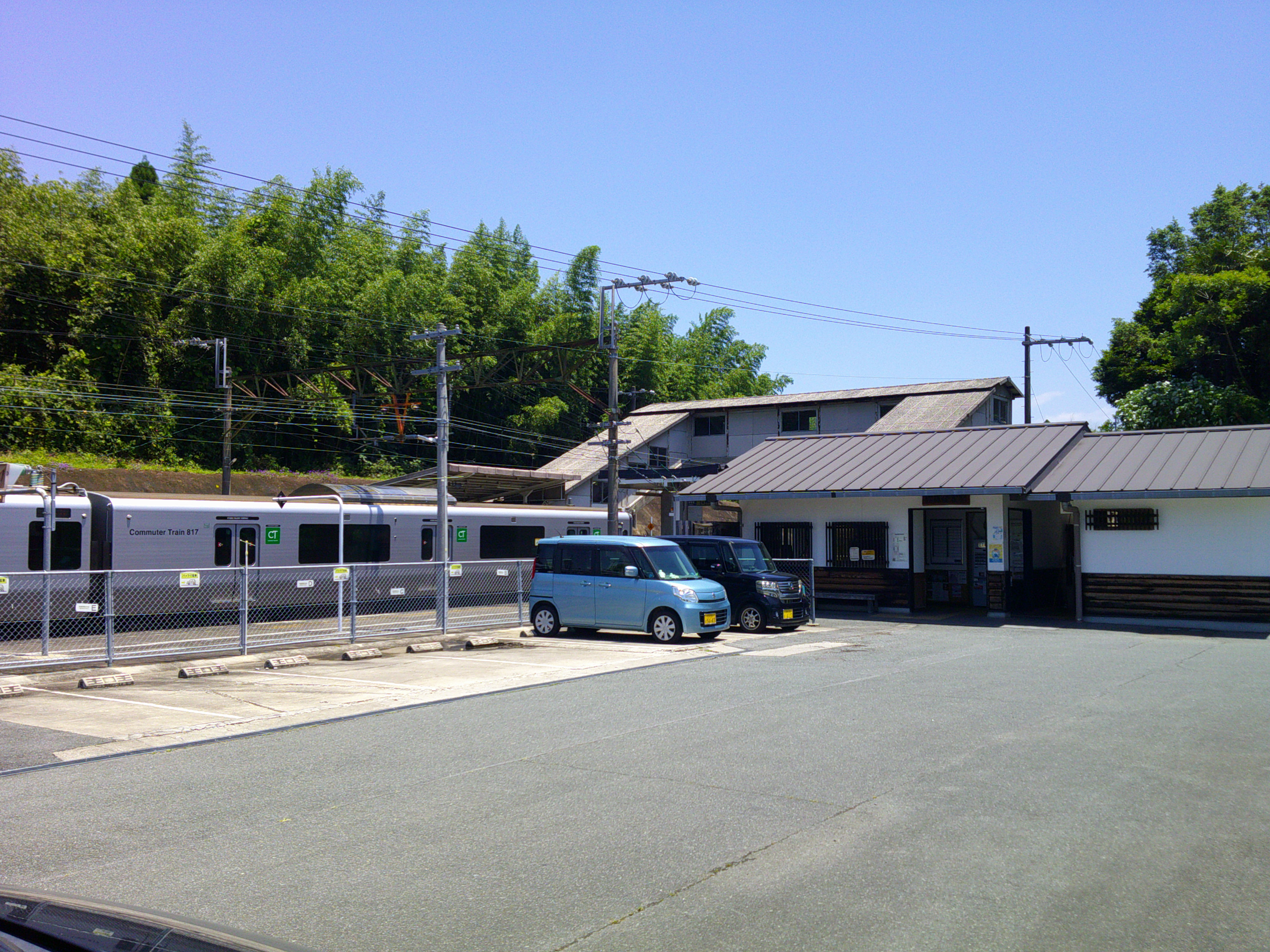
- station building and platform

General information
- Location: Ikurakitakata, Tamana-shi, Kumamoto-ken 865-0041; Japan
- Coordinates: 32°54′48″N 130°35′12″E
- Operator: JR Kyushu
- Line: ■ Kagoshima Main Line,
- Distance: 172.8 km from Mojikō
- Platforms: 2 side platforms
- Tracks: 2

Construction
- Structure type: At grade
- Cycle facilities: Bike shed

Other information
- Status: Kan'i itaku agent on site
- Website: Official website

History
- Opened: 3 April 1935

Services
Preceding station	JR Kyushu	Following station
Konoha towards Kagoshima	Kagoshima Main Line	Tamana towards Mojikō
Location
- Location within Kumamoto Prefecture Location within Japan

Higo-Ikura Station (肥後伊倉駅, Higo-Ikura-eki) is a passenger railway station located in the city of Tamana, Kumamoto Prefecture, Japan. It is operated by JR Kyushu.

== Lines ==
The station is served by the Kagoshima Main Line and is located 172.8 km from the starting point of the line at Mojiko.

== Layout ==
The station consists of two side platforms serving two tracks at grade. The station building is a wooden structure of traditional Japanese design. The station is not staffed by JR Kyushu but some types of tickets are available from a kan'i itaku agent on site who operates the ticket window. Access to the opposite side platform is by means of a footbridge.

=== Platforms ===
1	■ ■ Kagoshima Main Line	for Ōmuta, Kurume and Tosu
2	■ ■ Kagoshima Main Line	for Kumamoto and Yatsushiro

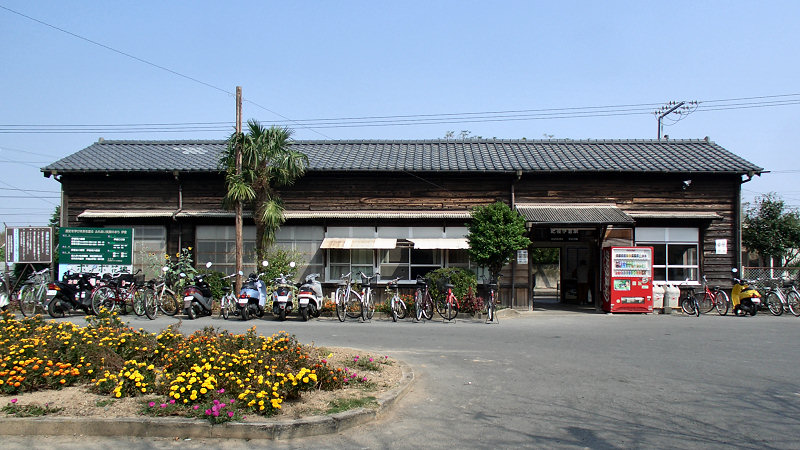
Former station building(October 2006)

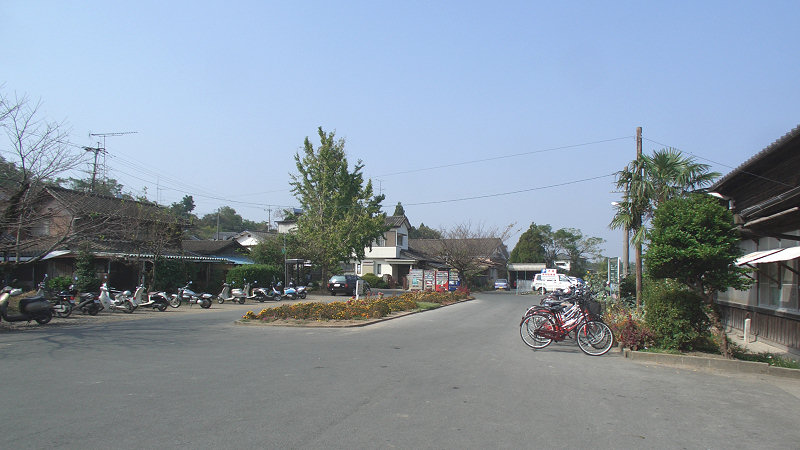
In front of the station(October 2006)

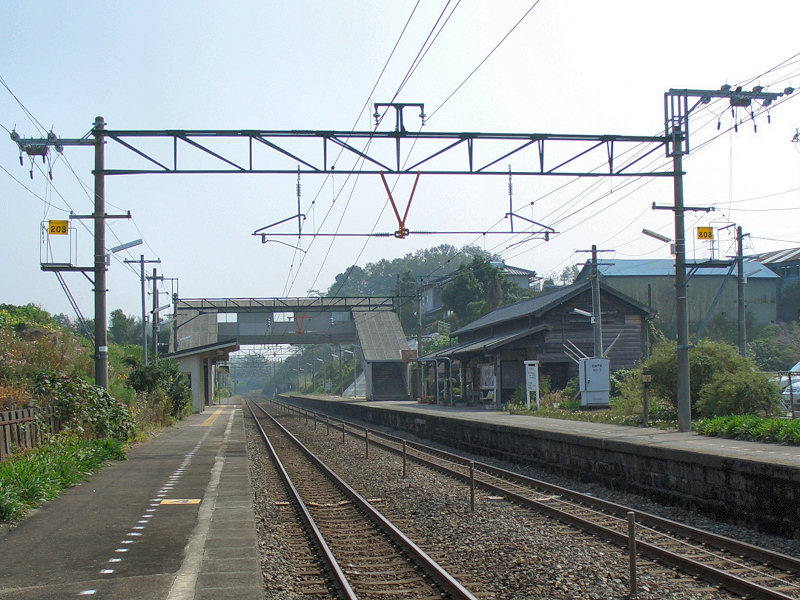
platform

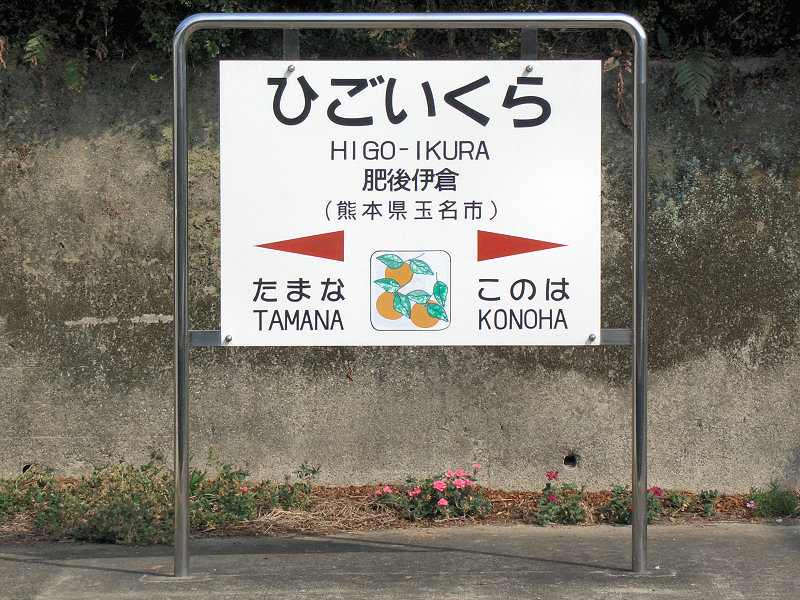
Station name sign

== History ==
Japanese Government Railways (JGR) opened the station on 3 April 1935 as an additional station on the existing track of the Kagoshima Main Line. With the privatization of Japanese National Railways (JNR), the successor of JGR, on 1 April 1987, JR Kyushu took over control of the station.

== Surrounding area ==
- Ikura Kita Hachiman Shrine
- Ikura Minami Hachiman Shrine

== See also ==
- List of railway stations in Japan
