= Chibusan-Obusan Kofun =

Kofun period burial mound in Japan

Chibusan - Obusan Kofun
- チブサン・オブサン古墳 (Japanese)
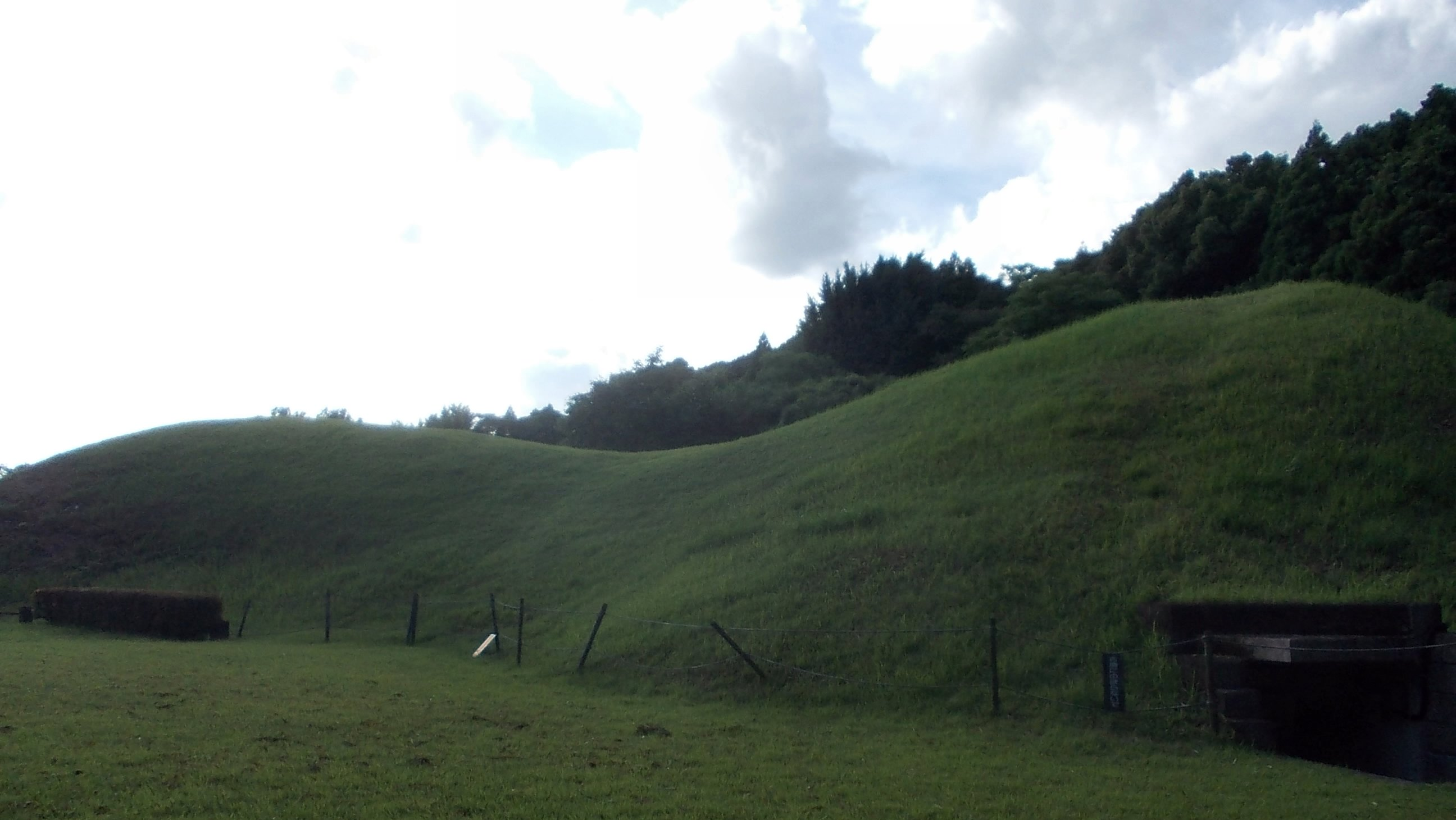
- Chibusan Kofun

- Chibusan - Obusan Kofun Chibusan-Obusan Kofun (Japan)
- 33°01′50″N 130°40′03″E
- Type: Kofun
- Periods: Kofun period
- Location: Yamaga, Kumamoto, Japan
- Region: Kyushu

History
- Built: c.6th century

Site notes
- Public access: Yes (no facilities)
- National Historic Site of Japan

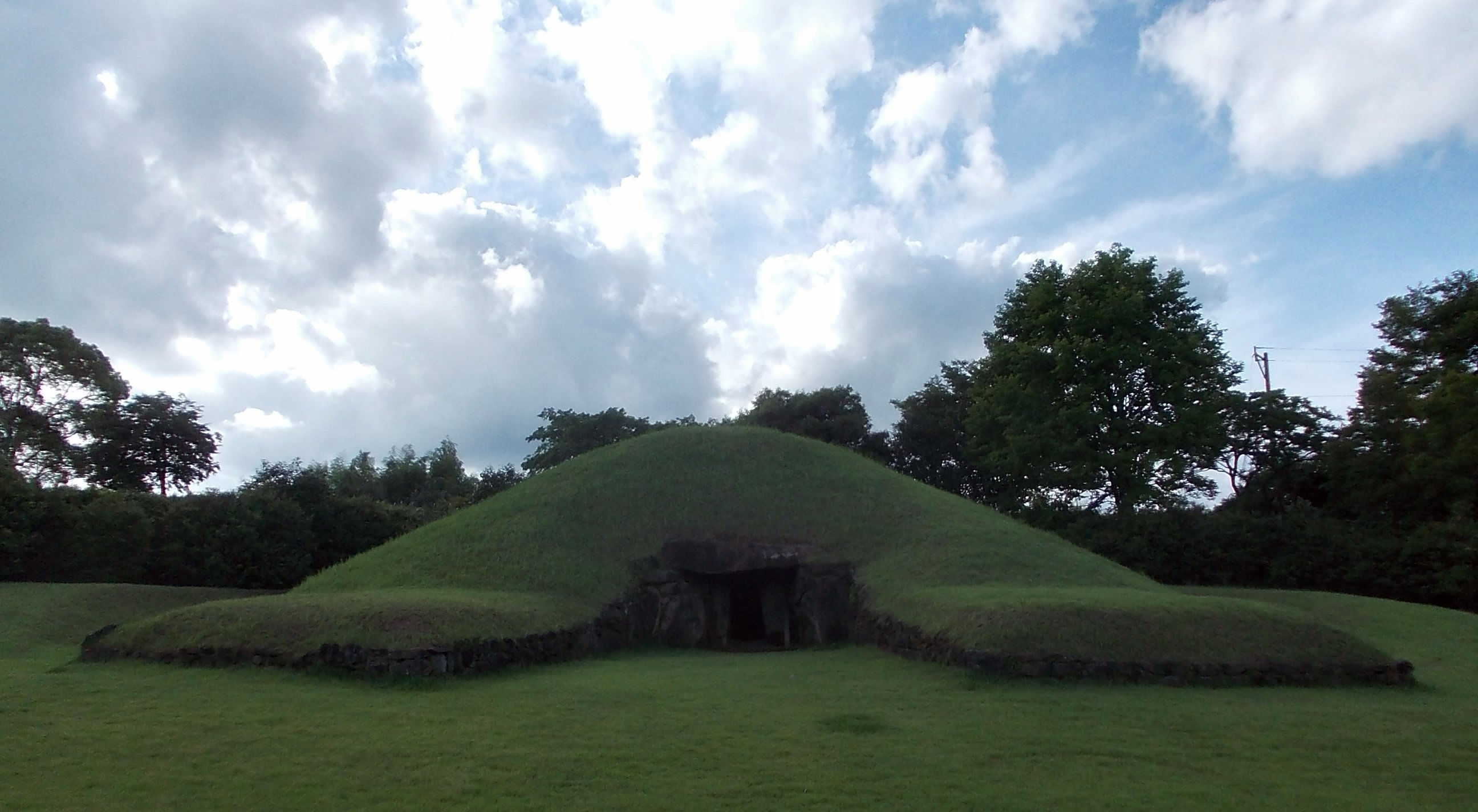
Obusan Kofun

Chibusan Kofun - Obusan Kofun (チブサン・オブサン古墳) are a pair of Kofun period burial mounds, located in the Jyō neighborhood of the city of Yamaga, Kumamoto, Japan. The Chibusan Kofun was designated a National Historic Site of Japan in 1922 and the Obusan Kofun was added to the designation in 1999.

== Overview ==
The Chibusan Kofun is a zenpō-kōen-fun (前方後円墳), which is shaped like a keyhole, having one square end and one circular end, when viewed from above. It is located on the right bank of the Iwano River, a tributary of the Kikuchi River in the northern part of the prefecture, at the eastern end of the Hiraogi Plateau. The Chibusan Kofun has length of 45 meters, with a 24-meter diameter posterior circular part, and a 15.7 meter wide anterior rectangular portion. It has a multi-chambered horizontal entry stone burial chamber, with a front and rear chambers, and an antechamber to the south. It is a decorated kofun with colored murals of geometric patterns and figures wearing crowns on the inner walls and ceiling of the burial chamber. The upper row has seven white circular patterns, and the lower row has a figure wearing a crown with arms and legs spread and a triangular pattern to the right of it, painted in white, and the rest is painted in red. The side stones on the front are mainly painted with triangular and diamond patterns, with a circular pattern in the center of the front, and are painted in three colors: red, white, and blue. The tumulus is believed to have been constructed around the mid-6th century. The tumulus has been open since ancient times, and the present location of any excavated grave goods are unknown, but cylindrical and figurative haniwa have been excavated in preliminary surveys. A stone figure in the shape of octopus once stood at the boundary between the front and rear mounds. It is currently kept at the Tokyo National Museum.

The nearby Obusan Kofun is a circular en-fun (円墳) tumulus with a diameter of 22 meters surrounded by a moat about 4 meters wide. No haniwa or fukiishi have been found. It was built in the late 6th century and had post-burial sites until the early 7th century. It has a stone burial chamber with a total length of approximately 8.5 meters from the main gate to the inner wall, and if the 8 meters of the vestibule are added, it comes to 16.5 meters. A series of red triangular patterns were found on the partition stone that marks the inner chamber's coffin platform, and a small red ridge or shield was also found on the inner wall, but these were only traces and could not be read by the naked eye. It is highly likely that the inner chamber originally had richly decorated murals. Horse equipment with a base of iron and gold and copper plating has been excavated.

The kofun are the central portion of the Kumamoto Prefectural Fudoki-no-Oka Park. The tumulus is about 17 kilometers northeast of Shin-Tamana Station on the Kyushu Shinkansen.

== See also ==
- List of Historic Sites of Japan (Kumamoto)
- Decorated kofun
