= Sojo University =

Private University in Nishi-ku, Kunamoto, Japan

Coordinates: 32.831113°N 130.696331°E

- 崇城大学
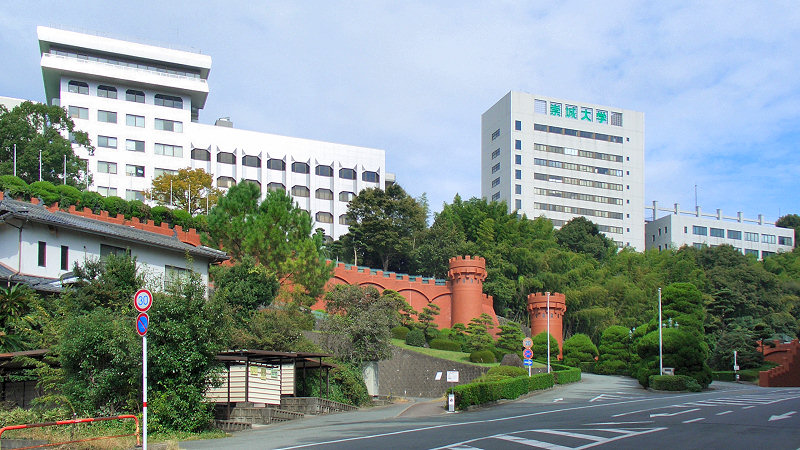
- Type: Private
- Established: 1967
- President: Mineo Nakayama
- Location: Kumamoto, Kumamoto Prefecture, Japan
- Website: Official website

Sojo University (崇城大学, Sōjō daigaku) is a private university in Nishi-ku, Kumamoto, Japan. The predecessor of the school was founded in 1949, and it was chartered as a junior college in 1965. After becoming a four-year college in 1967, it adopted the present name in 2000. In 2001 Japanese Course for foreign students was opened. In 2004 Graduate School of Art was established, division of Fine Art Master Course and division of Design Master Course was opened and applied Life Science Master Course and applied Life Science Doctoral Course opened.
