= Tamana Station =

Railway station in Tamana, Kumamoto Prefecture, Japan

Tamana Station 玉名駅
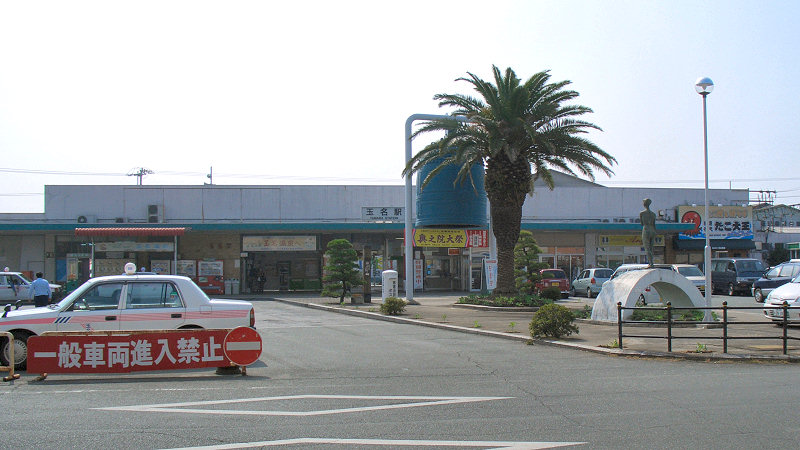
- Tamana Station in 2006

General information
- Location: 1046 Naka, Tamana-shi, Kumamoto-ken 865-0064; Japan
- Coordinates: 32°55′33″N 130°32′53″E
- Operator: JR Kyushu
- Line: ■ Kagoshima Main Line,
- Distance: 168.6 km from Mojikō
- Platforms: 1 side + 1 island platforms
- Tracks: 3

Construction
- Structure type: At grade

Other information
- Status: Staffed ticket window (Midori no Madoguchi) (outsourced)
- Website: Official website

History
- Opened: 1 April 1891
- Former names: Takase (until 10 April 1956)

Passengers
- FY2020: 1971 daily
- Rank: 73rd (among JR Kyushu stations)

Services
Preceding station	JR Kyushu	Following station
Higo-Ikura towards Kagoshima	Kagoshima Main Line	Ōnoshimo towards Mojikō
Location
- Location within Kumamoto Prefecture Location within Japan

Tamana Station (玉名駅, Tamana-eki) is a railway station located in the city of Tamana, Kumamoto Prefecture, Japan. It is operated by JR Kyushu.

== Lines ==
The station is served by the Kagoshima Main Line and is located 168.6 km from the starting point of the line at Mojiko.

== Layout ==
The station consists of a side platform and an island platform serving three tracks at grade. The station building is a concrete structure of modern design and houses a kiosk, an enclosed waiting room and a staffed ticket window. Access to the island platform is by means of a footbridge.

Management of the station has been outsourced to the JR Kyushu Tetsudou Eigyou Co., a wholly owned subsidiary of JR Kyushu specialising in station services. It staffs the ticket counter which is equipped with a Midori no Madoguchi facility.

=== Platforms ===
1	■ ■ Kagoshima Main Line	for Kumamoto
2, 3	■ ■ Kagoshima Main Line	for Ōmuta, Kurume and Tosu

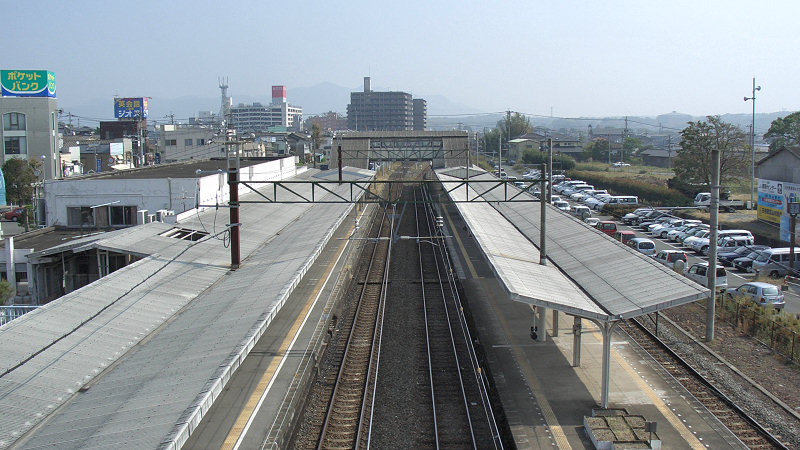
Platforms

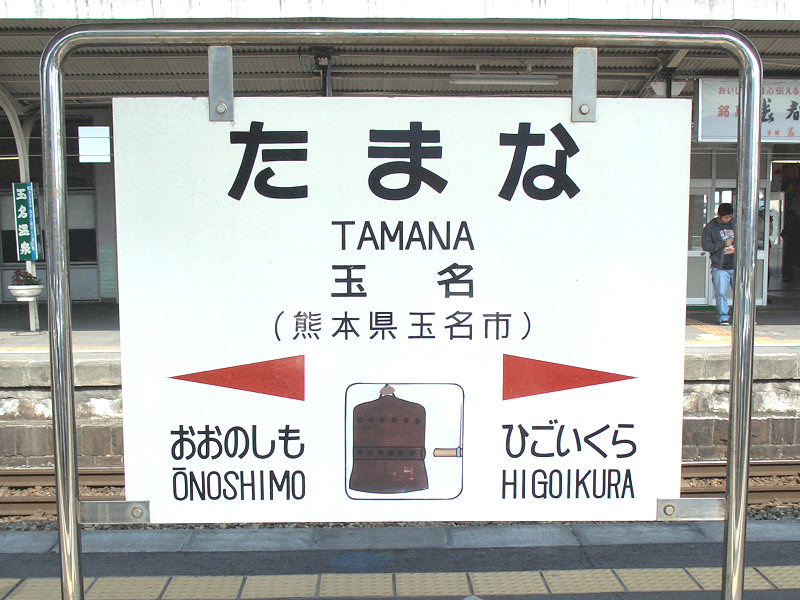
Signboard

== History ==
The privately run Kyushu Railway had opened a stretch of track between Hakata and the (now closed) Chitosegawa temporary stop on 11 December 1889. After several phases of expansion northwards and southwards, by February 1891, the line stretched from Kurosaki south to Kurume. In the next phase of expansion, the track was extended south with this station opening as the new southern terminus on 1 April 1891 with the name Takase. On 1 July 1891, it became a through-station when the track was further extended to Kumamoto. When the Kyushu Railway was nationalized on 1 July 1907, Japanese Government Railways (JGR) took over control of the station. On 12 October 1909, the station became part of the Hitoyoshi Main Line and then on 21 November 1909, part of the Kagoshima Main Line. On 10 April 1956, the station was renamed Tamana. With the privatization of Japanese National Railways (JNR), the successor of JGR, on 1 April 1987, JR Kyushu took over control of the station.

== Passenger statistics ==
In fiscal 2020, the station was used by an average of 1971 passengers daily (boarding passengers only), and it ranked 73rd among the busiest stations of JR Kyushu.

== Surrounding area ==
- Tamana City Hall
- Kyushu University of Nursing and Social Welfare

== See also ==
- List of railway stations in Japan
