= List of cultural properties of Japan – paintings (Kumamoto) =

This list is of the cultural properties of Japan designated in the category of paintings (絵画, kaiga) for the Prefecture of Kumamoto.

== National Cultural Properties ==
As of 1 July 2019, two Important Cultural Properties have been designated, being of national significance.

Property	Date	Municipality	Ownership	Comments	Image	Dimensions	Coordinates	Ref.
Portrait said to be of Kikuchi Yoshiyuki, colour on silk 絹本著色伝菊池能運像 kenpon chakushoku den-Kikuchi Yoshiyuki zō	1603	Kikuchi	Kikuchi Shrine			98.1 centimetres (38.6 in) by 39.3 centimetres (15.5 in)	32°59′16″N 130°48′58″E	
Portraits said to be of Hōjō Tokisada and Hōjō Tokimune, colour on silk 絹本著色伝北条時定像 絹本著色伝北条時宗像 kenpon chakushoku den-Hōjō Tokisada zō kenpon chakushoku den-Hōjō Tokimune zō	Kamakura period	Minamioguni	Mangan-ji (満願寺)			69.1 centimetres (27.2 in) by 36.1 centimetres (14.2 in)	33°04′34″N 131°05′45″E	

== Prefectural Cultural Properties ==
Properties designated at a prefectural level include:

Property	Date	Municipality	Ownership	Comments	Image	Dimensions	Coordinates	Ref.
Shaka Coming Forth from the Mountains and Kannon Bosatsu, colour on paper 紙本著色出山釈迦図及び観世音菩薩図 shihon chakushoku shussan Shaka zu oyobi Kannon Bosatsu zu	1841	Kumamoto	Kumamoto Prefectural Museum of Art	by Fukuda Taika (福田太華) (1795-1854)		324 centimetres (128 in) by 131 centimetres (52 in) and 346 centimetres (136 in) by 133 centimetres (52 in)	32°48′27″N 130°42′02″E	
Sparrows and Bamboo, ink on paper 紙本水墨雀竹図 shihon suiboku suzume take zu	Nanboku-chō period/early Muromachi period	Kumamoto	Kumamoto Prefectural Museum of Art				32°48′27″N 130°42′02″E	
Amida Triad, colour on silk 絹本著色阿弥陀三尊図 kenpon chakushoku Amida sanzon zu		Kumamoto						
Descent of the Amida Triad, colour on silk 絹本著色阿弥陀三尊来迎図 kenpon chakushoku Amida sanzon raigō zu		Kumamoto						
Miyamoto Musashi, colour on silk 紙本著色宮本武蔵像 kenpon chakushoku Miyamoto Musashi zō	C17	Kumamoto	Shimada Museum of Art (島田美術館)			98.1 centimetres (38.6 in) by 39.3 centimetres (15.5 in)	32°48′35″N 130°41′10″E	
Seven Sages of the Bamboo Grove, byōbu 竹林七賢図屏風 chikurin shichi-ken zu byōbu	Momoyama period	Kumamoto	Eisei Bunko (kept at Kumamoto Prefectural Museum of Art)	pair of six-fold screens; by Unkoku Tōgan		365 centimetres (144 in) by 156 centimetres (61 in)	32°48′27″N 130°42′02″E	
Descent of the Amida Triad, colour on silk 絹本著色阿弥陀三尊来迎図 kenpon chakushoku Amida sanzon raigō zu	Nanboku-chō period	Aso	Saiganden-ji (西巌殿寺)				32°55′54″N 131°04′45″E	
Mandala of the Two Realms, colour on silk 絹本著色両界曼荼羅 kenpon chakushoku ryōkai mandara zu	Nanboku-chō period	Hitoyoshi	Ganjō-ji (願成寺)				32°13′05″N 130°46′22″E	
Shūzan Genchū and Taihō Genkai, colour on paper 紙本著色秀山元中和尚画像 紙本著色大方元恢和尚画像 shihon chakushoku Shūzan Genchū oshō gazō shihon chakushoku Taihō Genkai oshō gazō	early Muromachi period	Kikuchi	Shōkan-ji (正観寺)	pair of scrolls		130 centimetres (51 in) by 45.5 centimetres (17.9 in) and 125 centimetres (49 in) by 45.7 centimetres (18.0 in)	32°59′02″N 130°49′02″E	
Fudō Myōō, colour on silk 絹本著色不動明王画像 kenpon chakushoku Fudō Myōō gazō	early Muromachi period	Kikuchi	Tōfuku-ji (東福寺)			294 centimetres (116 in) by 107.4 centimetres (42.3 in)	32°59′02″N 130°49′14″E	
Kikuchi Tamekuni, colour on silk 絹本著色菊池為邦画像 kenpon chakushoku Kikuchi Tamekuni gazō	early Edo period	Kikuchi	Hekigan-ji (碧巌寺) (kept at Kikuchi Shrine)				32°59′16″N 130°48′58″E	
Buddhist paintings from Mangan-ji 満願寺の仏画; Manganji no butzuga		Minamioguni	Mangan-ji (満願寺)				33°04′34″N 131°05′45″E	

== See also ==
- Cultural Properties of Japan
- List of National Treasures of Japan (paintings)
- Japanese painting
- List of Historic Sites of Japan (Kumamoto)
- List of Cultural Properties of Japan - historical materials (Kumamoto)
- Kumamoto Prefectural Ancient Burial Mound Museum
