= List of cultural properties of Japan – historical materials (Kumamoto) =

This list is of the cultural properties of Japan designated in the category of historical materials (歴史資料, rekishi shiryō) for the Prefecture of Kumamoto.

== National Cultural Properties ==
As of 1 February 2015, one Important Cultural Property has been designated, being of national significance.

Property	Date	Municipality	Ownership	Comments	Image	Coordinates	Ref.
Materials relating to Amakusa Shirō Tokisada 天草四郎時貞関係資料; Amakusa Shirō Tokisada kankei shiryō	early Edo period	Amakusa	Amakusa Christian Museum	4 items, including a banner (pictured) used in the Shimabara Rebellion		32°27′36″N 130°11′03″E	

== Prefectural Cultural Properties ==
Properties designated at a prefectural level include:

Property	Date	Municipality	Ownership	Comments	Image	Coordinates	Ref.
Ryōnai Meishō Zukan 領内名勝図巻 ryōnai meishō zukan	1793	Kumamoto	Eisei Bunko (kept at Kumamoto Prefectural Museum of Art)	14 scrolls, depicting the domain's meisho; 396.7 metres (1,302 ft) by 59.2 centimetres (23.3 in)		32°48′27″N 130°42′02″E	

== Municipal Cultural Properties ==
Properties designated at a municipal level include:

Property	Date	Municipality	Ownership	Comments	Image	Coordinates	Ref.
Rosary and Jar ロザリオと壺 rozario to tsubo	Edo period	Amakusa	Amakusa Christian Museum	discovered during construction work by the coast in 1965, the seventeenth-century Chinese porcelain jar had inside it a necklace made from antlers, below which was a cross and a miniature image of Mary		32°27′36″N 130°11′03″E	
Official Bulletin Board Prohibiting Assembly 徒党禁止高札 totō kinshi kōsatsu	1770	Amakusa	Amakusa Christian Museum	the notice prohibits farmers from assembling and promises rewards for informers		32°27′36″N 130°11′03″E	
Oato Jizō Records, Nishinomiya Records, Ebisu Festival Records 尾跡地蔵講帳･西之宮講帳･恵美須祭礼帳; Oato Jizō kōchō･Nishinomiya kōchō･Ebisu saireichō	1810-1955	Kumamoto	Oato Community Centre (尾跡公民館)			32°50′08″N 130°35′22″E	
Documents from Kawachimachi Town Hall 河内町役場文書; Kawachimachi yakuba monsho	1764 to Shōwa period	Kumamoto				32°49′50″N 130°35′17″E	
Tsunami Memorial Tō 津波供養塔 tsunami kuyō tō	1793	Kumamoto		hōkyōintō erected in April 1793 after the tsunami of 1 April 1792 that resulted from a landslide on Mount Unzen		32°49′50″N 130°35′17″E	
Tsunami Memorial Stele 津波供養碑 tsunami kuyō hi	1795	Kumamoto				32°49′50″N 130°35′17″E	
Tsunami Memorial Stele 津波供養碑 (蓮光寺) tsunami kuyō hi (Renkōji)		Kumamoto	Renkō-ji (蓮光寺)	commemorates 765 people from four villages who died in the tsunami		32°49′53″N 130°35′19″E	
Tsunami Memorial Inscription 津波供養碑 tsunami kuyō hi		Kumamoto		inscribed boulder commemorating the 1792 tsunami		32°49′50″N 130°35′17″E	
Kumamoto Castle Exit and Entry Permit 熊本城出入鑑札附延享二年覚書; Kumamoto-jō shutsunyū kansatsu tsuketari Enkyō ninen oboegaki		Kumamoto	Kumamoto Castle	designation includes a note dated Enkyō 2 (1745)		32°48′22″N 130°42′21″E	

== See also ==
- Cultural Properties of Japan
- List of National Treasures of Japan (historical materials)
- List of Historic Sites of Japan (Kumamoto)
- Higo Province
