= List of places of scenic beauty of Japan (Kumamoto) =

This list is of the places of scenic beauty of Japan located within the Prefecture of Kumamoto.

== National Places of Scenic Beauty ==
As of 1 November 2021, ten Places have been designated at a national level.

Site	Municipality	Comments	Image	Coordinates	Type	Ref.
Shōhinken Gardens 旧熊本藩八代城主浜御茶屋（松浜軒）庭園; Kyū-Kumamoto-han Yatsushiro-jō-shu hama-ochaya (Shōhinken) teien	Yatsushiro			32°30′34″N 130°35′47″E	1	
Suizen-ji Jōju-en 水前寺成趣園; Suizenji Jōju-en	Kumamoto	also an Historic Site		32°47′28″N 130°44′05″E	1, 8	
Mount Sengan and Mount Takabuto 千厳山および高舞登山; Sengan-san oyobi Takabuto-yama	Kami-Amakusa			32°31′22″N 130°26′30″E	11	
Places of Scenic Beauty in the Territory of Higo 肥後領内名勝地; Higo ryōnai meishō chi	Yamato, Yatsushiro, Hikawa, Kuma	designation comprises Gorō Falls (五郎ガ瀧, Gorō-ga-taki), Hijiri Falls (聖リ瀧, Hijiri-daki), Hashirimizu Falls (走リ水ノ瀧, Hashiri-mizu no taki), Tategami Rock (建神ノ岩, Tategami no iwa), and Kōnose-no-Iwaya (神ノ瀬ノ岩屋, Kōnose no iwaya)		32°27′39″N 130°42′15″E	5, 6	
Shiranui and Mizushima 不知火及び水島; Shiranui oyobi Mizushima	Uki, Yatsushiro			32°28′19″N 130°34′09″E	11	
Komezuka and Kusasenrigahama 米塚及び草千里ヶ浜; Komezuka oyobi Kusasenrigahama	Aso, Minamiaso	also a Natural Monument		32°53′01″N 131°03′09″E	9	
Myōken Bay 妙見浦; Myōken-ura	Amakusa	also a Natural Monument		32°24′19″N 129°59′47″E	8	
Ryūgatake 龍ヶ岳; Ryūgatake	Kami-Amakusa			32°24′17″N 130°22′47″E	11	
Ryūsentō Island 龍仙島（片島） Ryūsentō (Katashima)	Amakusa	also a Natural Monument		32°08′45″N 129°58′22″E	8	
Mount Rokurōji 六郎次山; Rokurōji-yama	Amakusa			32°16′04″N 130°05′18″E	11	

== Prefectural Places of Scenic Beauty ==
As of 1 May 2021, three Places have been designated at a prefectural level.

Site	Municipality	Comments	Image	Coordinates	Type	Ref.
Unganzen-ji Precinct 雲巌禅寺境内; Unganzenji keidai	Kumamoto	also a Prefectural Historic Site		32°49′10″N 130°37′22″E		for all refs see
Mangan-ji Gardens 満願寺庭園; Manganji teien	Minamioguni	also a Prefectural Historic Site		33°04′34″N 131°05′45″E		
Uto Peninsula Okoshiki Coast and Surrounding Sands 宇土半島の御輿来海岸及びその周辺の砂; Uto-hantō no Okoshiki-kaigan oyobi sono shūhen no sa	Uto					

== Municipal Places of Scenic Beauty ==
As of 1 May 2021, thirty Places have been designated at a municipal level, including:

Site	Municipality	Comments	Image	Coordinates	Type	Ref.
Zuigan-ji Site 瑞巌寺跡; Zuiganji ato	Kumamoto	also a Municipal Historic Site		32°50′52″N 130°41′17″E		
Sairyū-en 栽柳園; Sairyū-en	Yatsushiro			32°29′34″N 130°36′11″E		
Kogase 小ヶ瀬; Kogase	Amakusa			32°19′17″N 129°57′39″E		

== Registered Places of Scenic Beauty ==
As of 1 November 2021, one Monument has been registered (as opposed to designated) as a Place of Scenic Beauty at a national level.

Place	Municipality	Comments	Image	Coordinates	Type	Ref.
Shiramizu Falls 白水の滝; Shiramizu no taki	Takamori	designation spans the borders with Taketa, Ōita		32°52′57″N 131°16′40″E		

== See also ==
- Cultural Properties of Japan
- List of parks and gardens of Kumamoto Prefecture
- List of Historic Sites of Japan (Kumamoto)
- List of Cultural Properties of Japan – paintings (Kumamoto)
