= Higo Hosokawa Garden =

Garden in Tokyo, Japan

- 肥後細川庭園
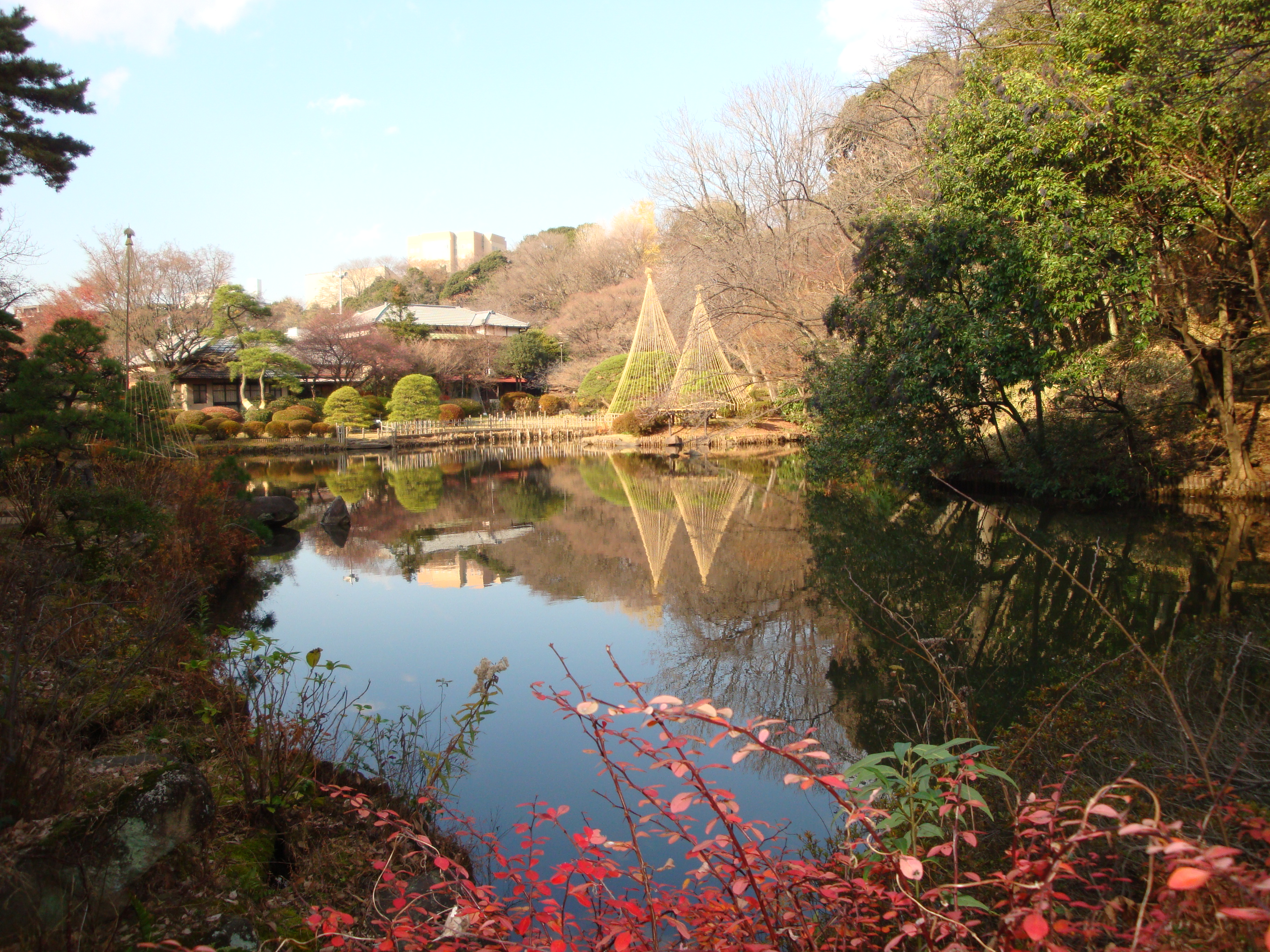
- Pond in the garden
- Interactive map of Higo Hosokawa Garden
- Type: Japanese garden
- Location: Bunkyō, Tokyo, Japan
- Coordinates: 35°42′47″N 139°43′21″E
- Area: About 500 square metres (0.12 acres)
- Created: 1961

Higo Hosokawa Garden (肥後細川庭園, Higo Hosokawa Kōen) is a Japanese garden located near the Kanda River in Bunkyō, Tokyo. The garden underwent renovation work and along with this there was a request for submission of a new name for the garden. The name was changed from Shin-Edogawa Garden (新江戸川区公園, Shin Edogawa Kōen) on March 18, 2017.

Formerly the second home of Hosokawa, the head of Kumamoto Domain at the end of the Edo period, the premises later became the main residence of the Hosokawa family. The park features a circular hill-and-pond garden that makes clever use of changes in elevation and emphasizes the garden's natural scenery. There are natural springs, stone lanterns, bamboo fences; the pond contains carps. The entrance building Shoseikaku, which was constructed in the Taisho era, was a studying place of the Hosokawa family.

The garden can be accessed by walking from Waseda Station or Edogawabashi Station. Regular hours are from 9:00 to 17:00. Admission is free.

A gate between the Shin-Edogawa park and the Eisei Bunko Museum is opened from 10:00 to 16:00. Migration in two of facilities becomes possible this time.

== Gallery ==
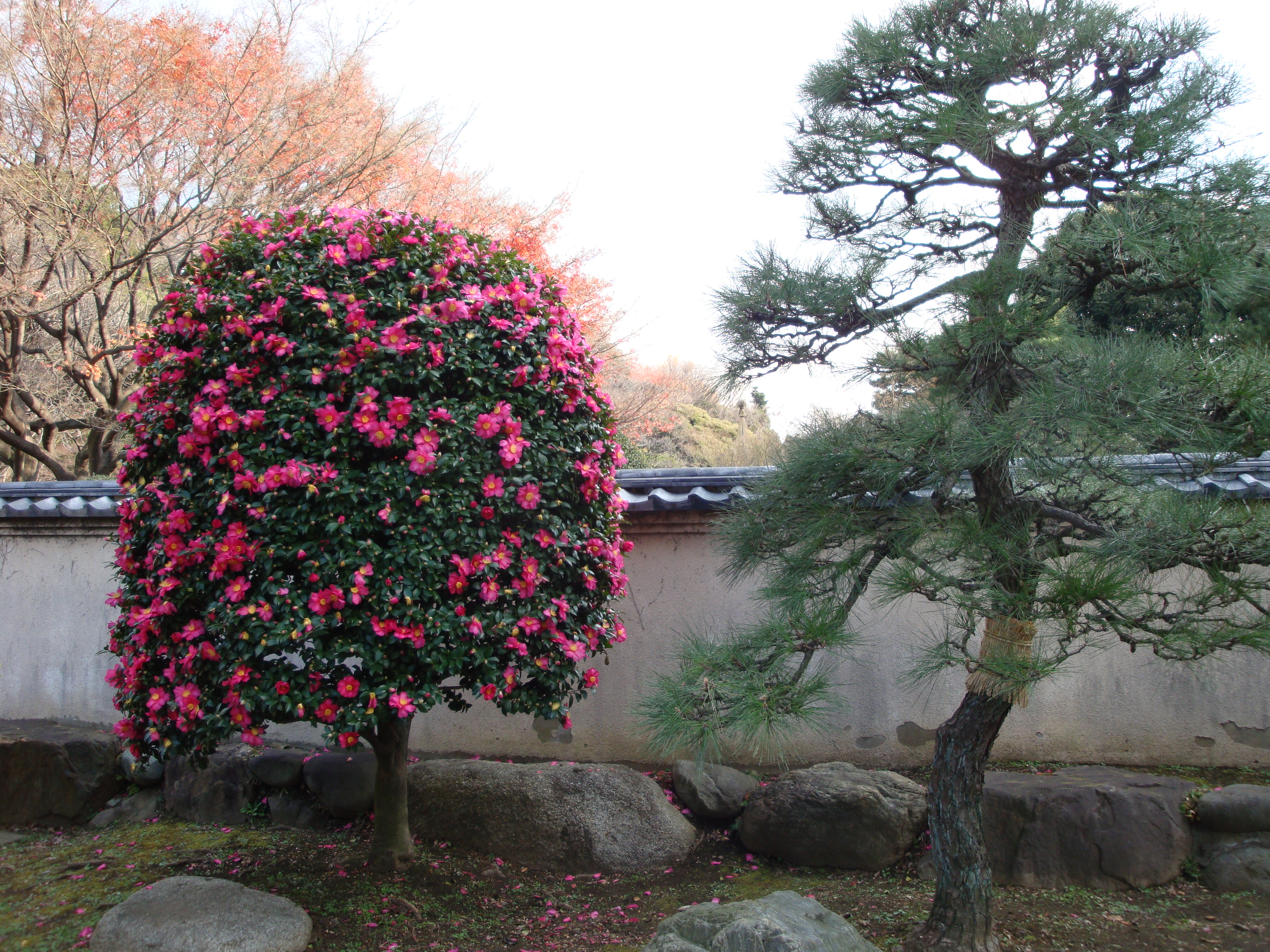

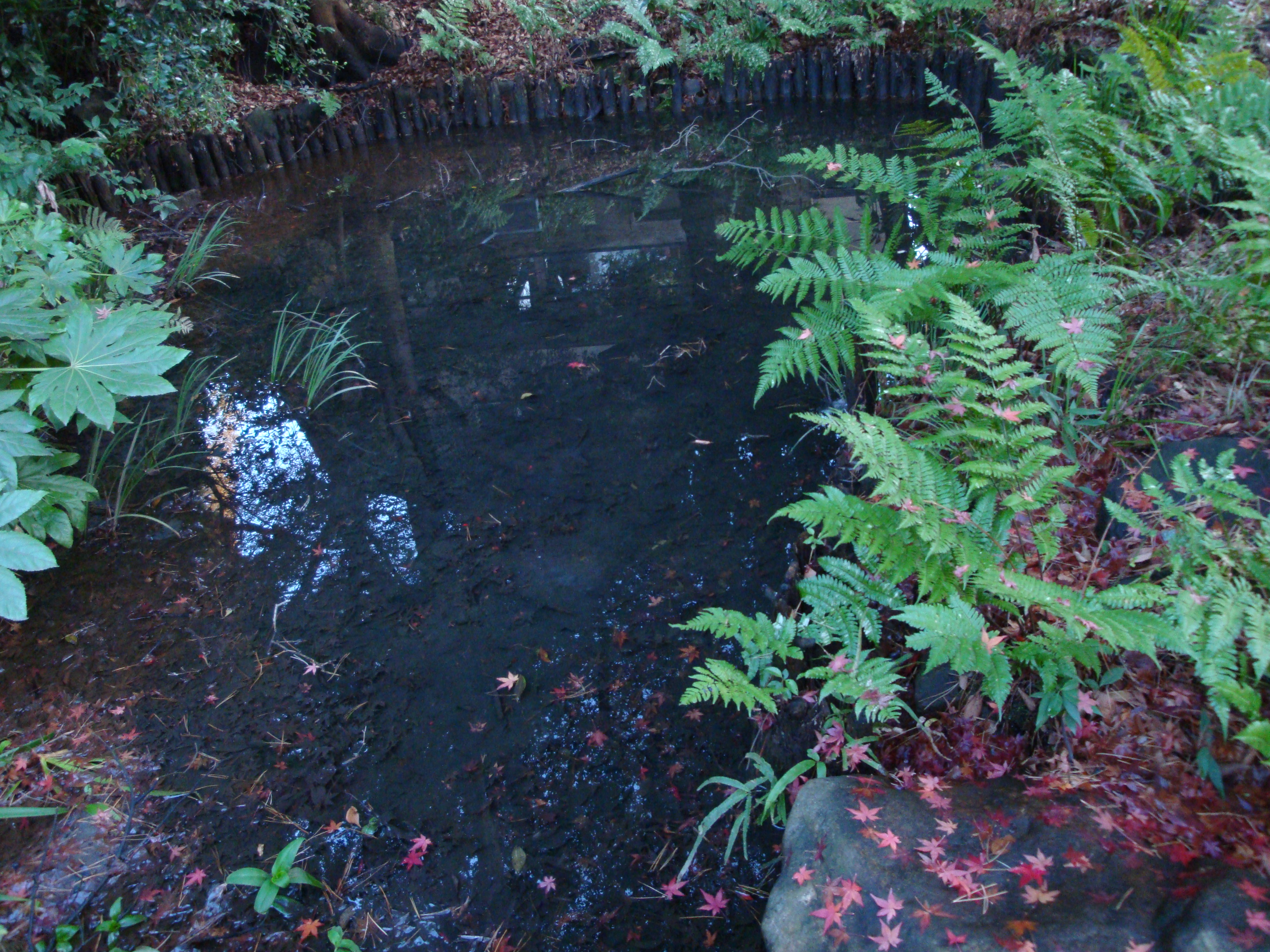

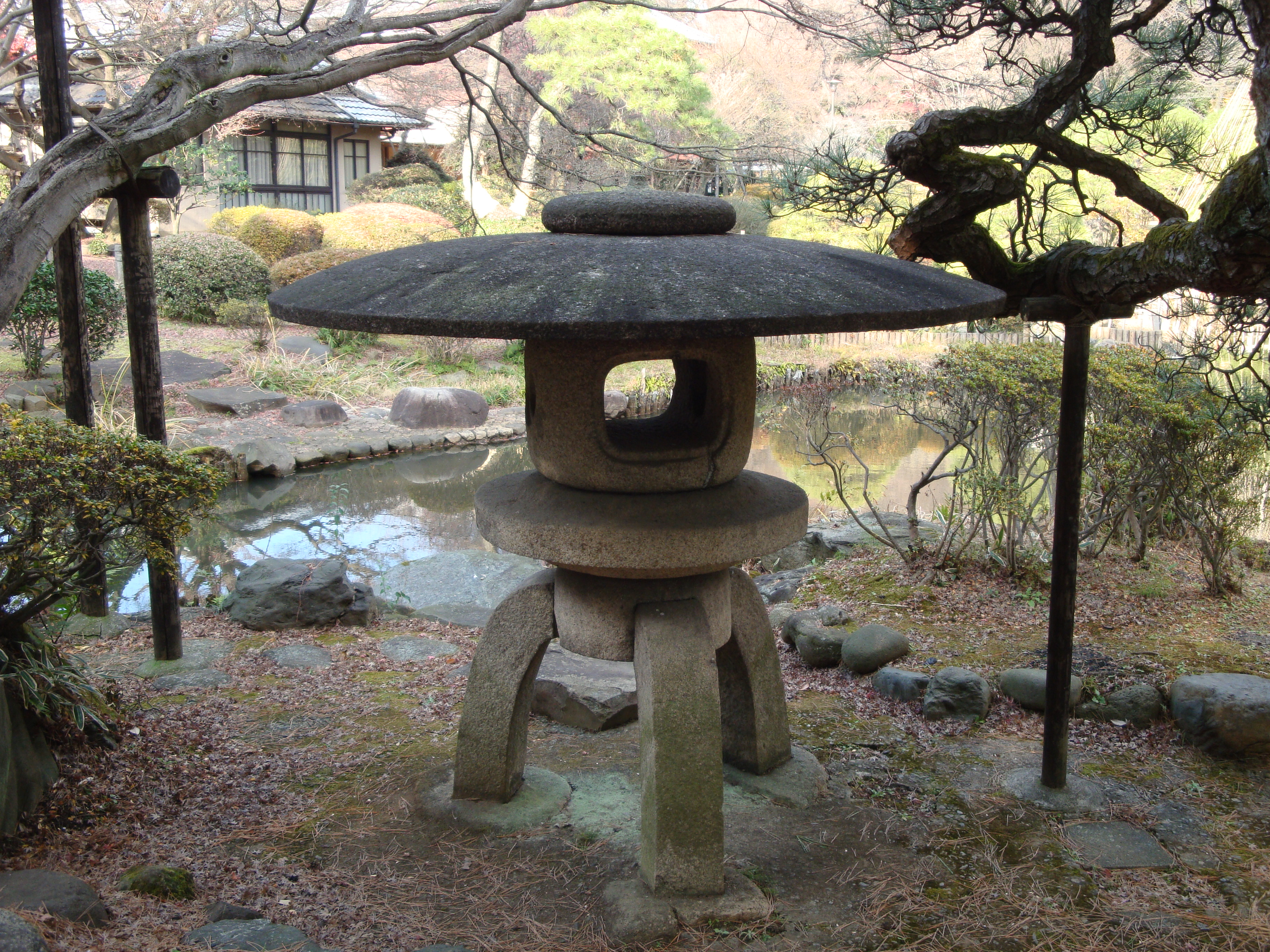

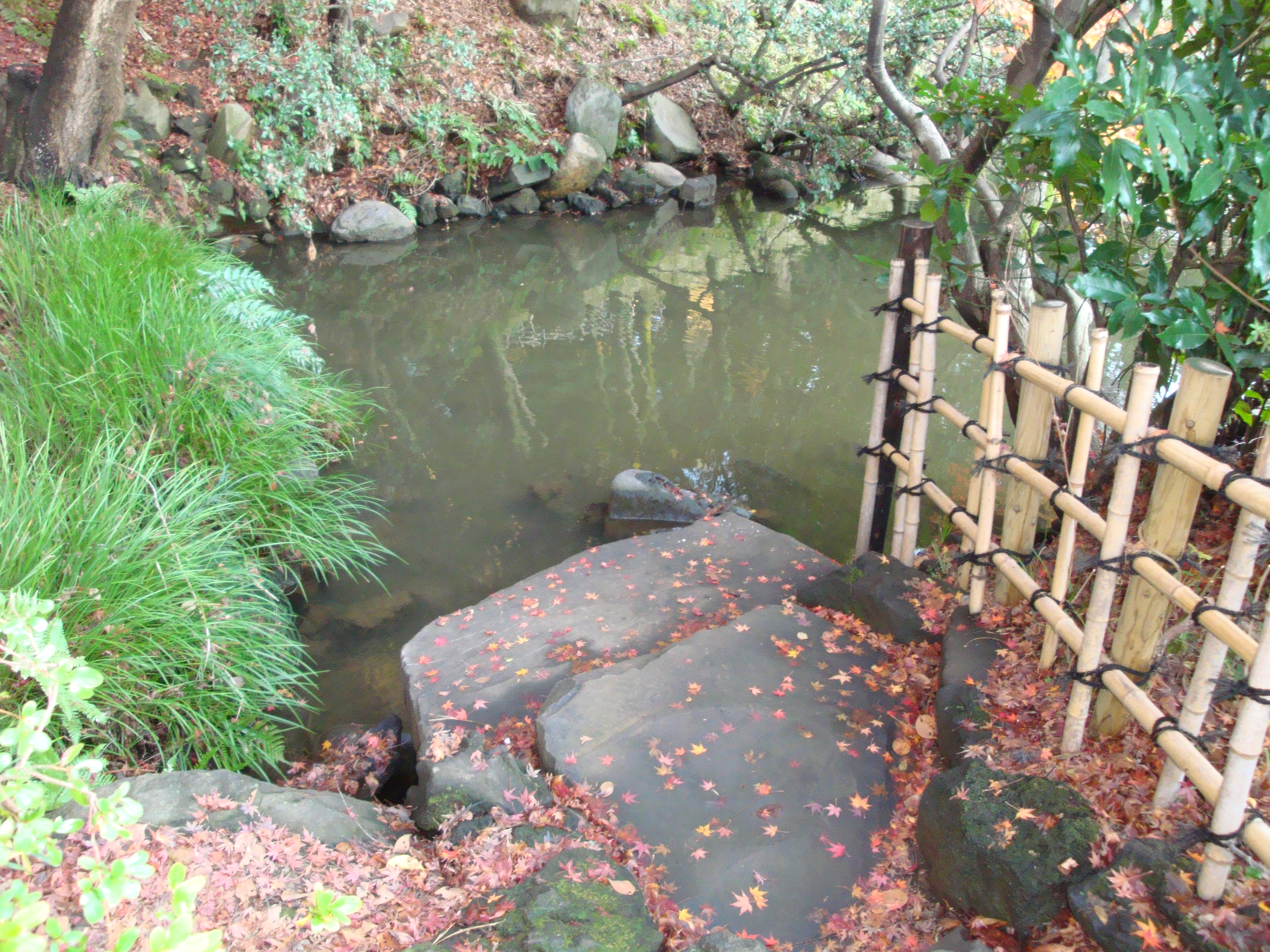
