= Mizushima (Yatsushiro) =

Native name: 水島
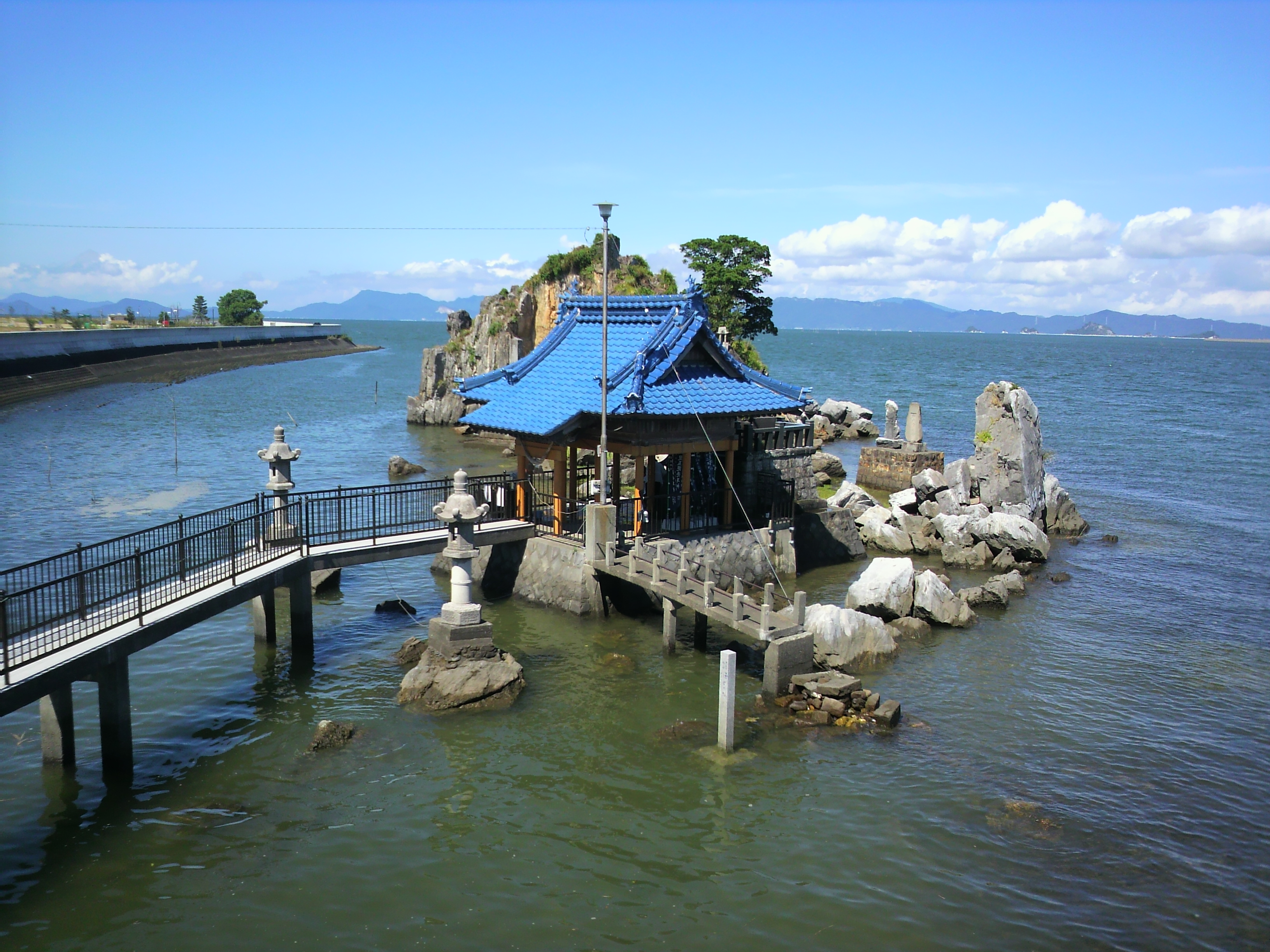
- Mizushima with Ryū Jinja (龍神社)

- Location within Japan

Geography
- Location: Yatsushiro, Kumamoto Prefecture, Japan
- Coordinates: 32°28′19″N 130°34′09″E
- Adjacent to: Yatsushiro Sea

Demographics
- Population: Uninhabited

Mizushima (水島) is a small uninhabited coastal limestone island at the mouth of the Kuma River at the northern end of the Yatsushiro Sea in Yatsushiro, Kumamoto Prefecture, Japan. An episode in the Nihon Shoki explains how the isle gained its name: on the eleventh day of the fourth month of the eighteenth year of the reign of Emperor Keikō (AD 88), the Emperor, near the end of his tour of inspection of Tsukushi, laid anchor at the island and partook of food. When he then asked Ohidari (小左) for water to drink, he was at a loss, there being no ready source to hand; praying to the gods, a spring issued forth, which he drew and proffered to the Heavenly Sovereign; from this the isle takes its name of "water island". The island also features in two poems by Prince Nagata (長田王) in the Man'yōshū (III.245 f.). As a joint designation with the local atmospheric and optical phenomenon known as Shiranui, Mizushima is a nationally designated Place of Scenic Beauty. It also forms part of the Japan Heritage "story" The Story of Masons who Developed Yatsushiro: Masonry Legacy in the Town of Masons.

== See also ==
- Cultural Properties of Japan
- List of Places of Scenic Beauty of Japan (Kumamoto)
- List of Historic Sites of Japan (Kumamoto)
