= Suizen-ji Jōju-en =

Japanese garden located in Suizen-ji Park

- 水前寺成趣園
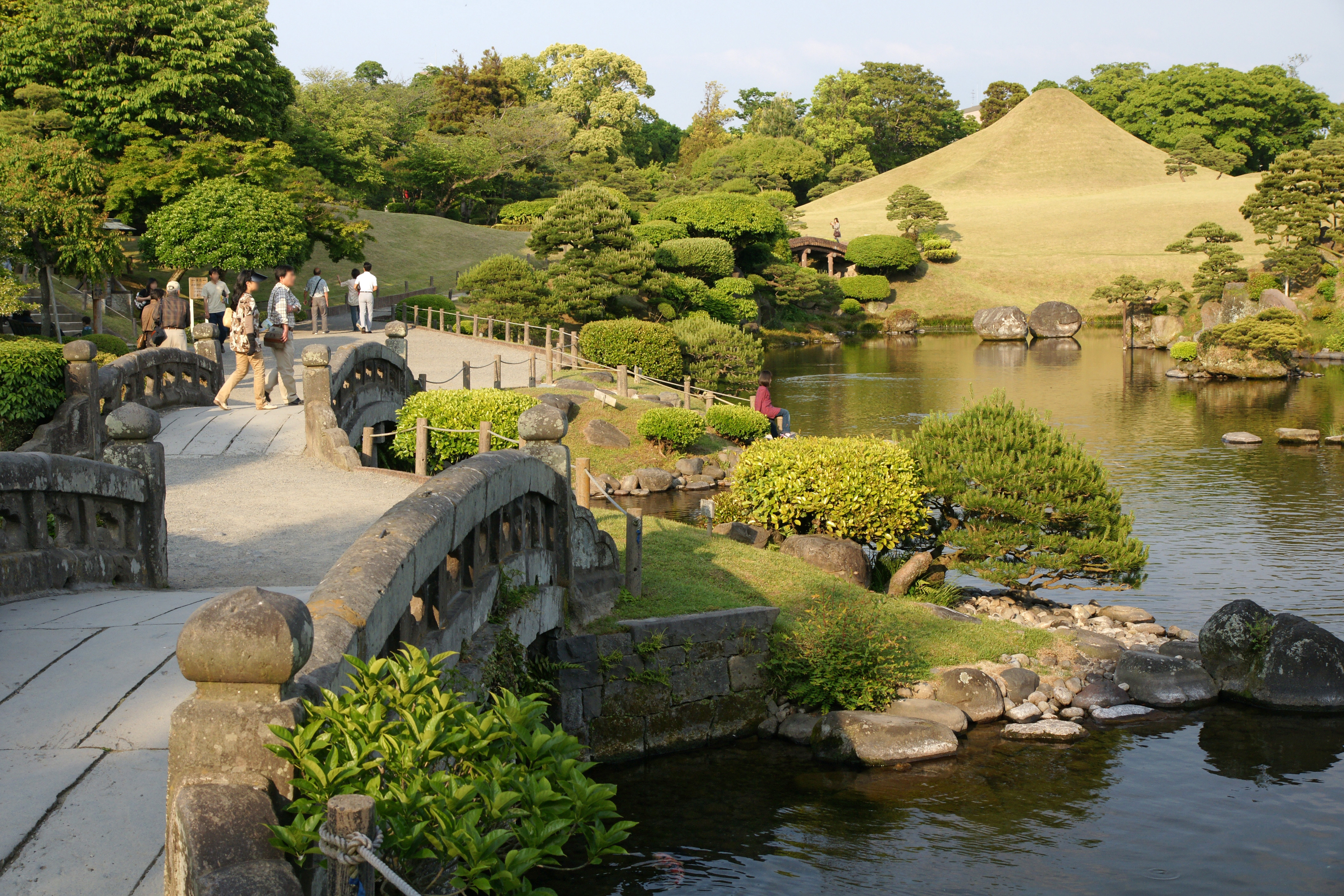
- Suizen-ji Jōju-en
- Interactive map of Suizen-ji Jōju-en
- Type: Japanese garden
- Location: Kumamoto Prefecture, Japan
- Coordinates: 32°47′28″N 130°44′05″E
- Area: 60,275 m^{2} (648,790 sq ft)
- Created: 1636
- National Historic Site of Japan National Place of Scenic Beauty

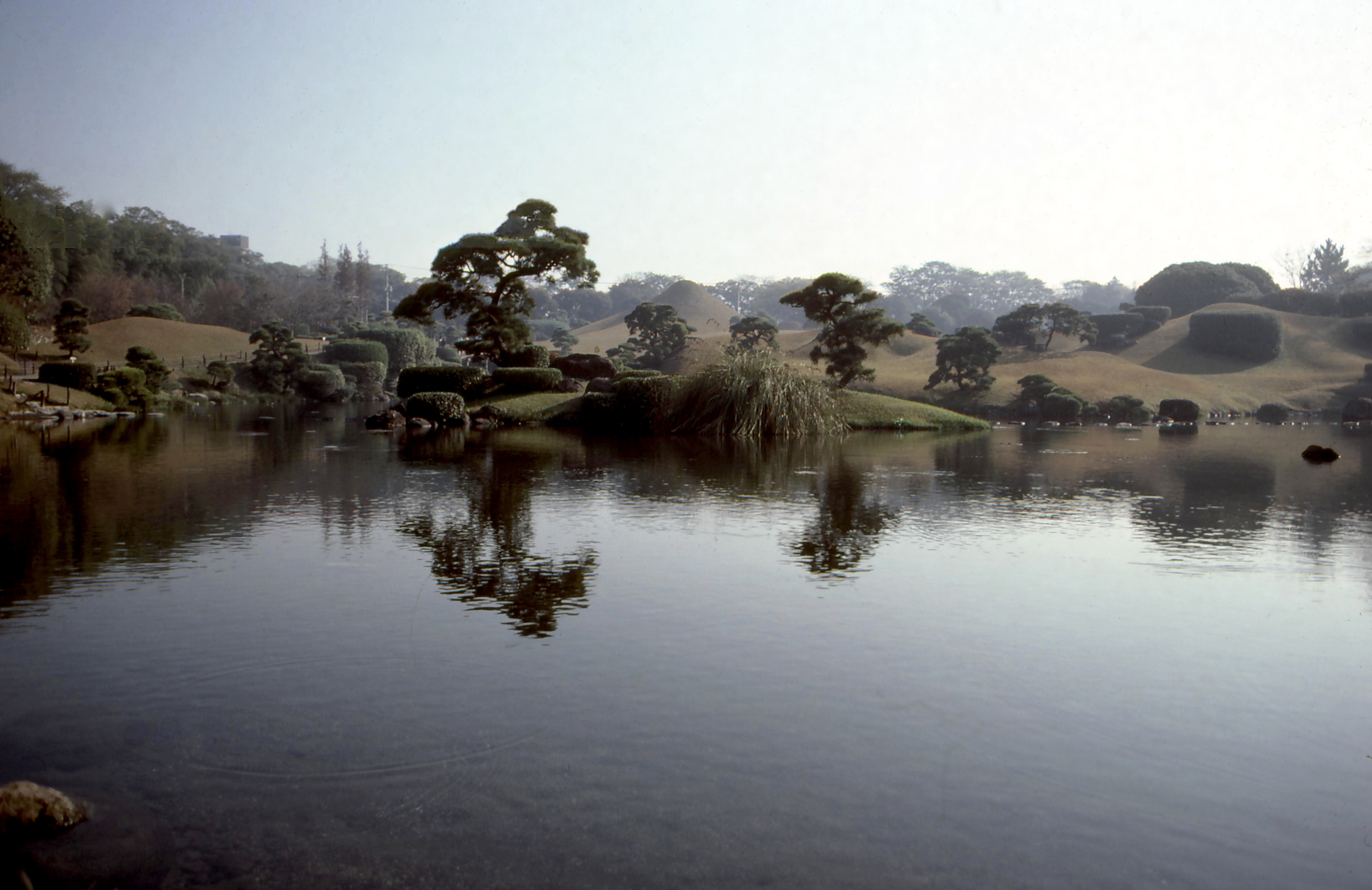
The pond 10 Nov 1978

Suizen-ji Jōju-en (水前寺成趣園) is a tsukiyama (Note: Tsukiyama gardens are Japanese gardens featuring an artificial mountain (a tsukiyama).) Japanese garden located within Suizen-ji Park (水前寺公園, Suizen-ji Kōen) in the eastern part of the city of Kumamoto, Kumamoto Prefecture, Japan. It was built during the Edo period by the Hosokawa clan, the daimyō of Kumamoto Domain. It is commonly known as "Suizenji Park". Its area is approximately 73,000 square meters. The garden features an artificial hill which is said to be modeled after Mount Fuji. The gardens were designated a National Place of Scenic Beauty and a National Historic Site in 1929.

== Overview ==
The garden began as a chashitsu for the Japanese tea ceremony built around 1636 by Hosokawa Tadatoshi, the first daimyō of Kumamoto, on the grounds of the Zen temple of Suizen-ji. Hosokawa selected this site because of its spring-fed pond, the clean water of which was excellent for tea. A monk named Gentaku was part of the retinue of Hosokawa Tadatoshi when he entered Higo Province, and he was given this land with a natural spring of water from Mount Aso to construct a temple; however the temple was abandoned around after Gentaku returned to his native Bungo Province and its land reverted to Kumamoto Domain. During the tenure of Hosokawa Tsunatoshi, the garden was reconstructed into a "strolling garden" with pathways and its artificial hill. It was named "Seishu-en" around this time, after a line from a poem by Tao Yuanming. Follwong the Meiji restoration, the garden became property of the central government, but the tea house was burned down and the garden laid waste by the 1877 Satsuma rebellion. A group of former retainers of Kumamoto Domain purchased the ruins, and erected a Shinto shrine, the Izumi Shrine, which was dedicated to the spirits of the Hosokawa clan. The thatched Kokin-Denju-no-Ma teahouse now on the site was originally a structure in Kyoto Imperial Palace, and was relocated here in 1912.

== Suizenji Park ==
Suizenji Kōen features miniature landscapes, a temple, and small lakes containing large koi. It is a short tram ride from the city. Nearby, there are souvenir and snack shops.

== Gallery ==
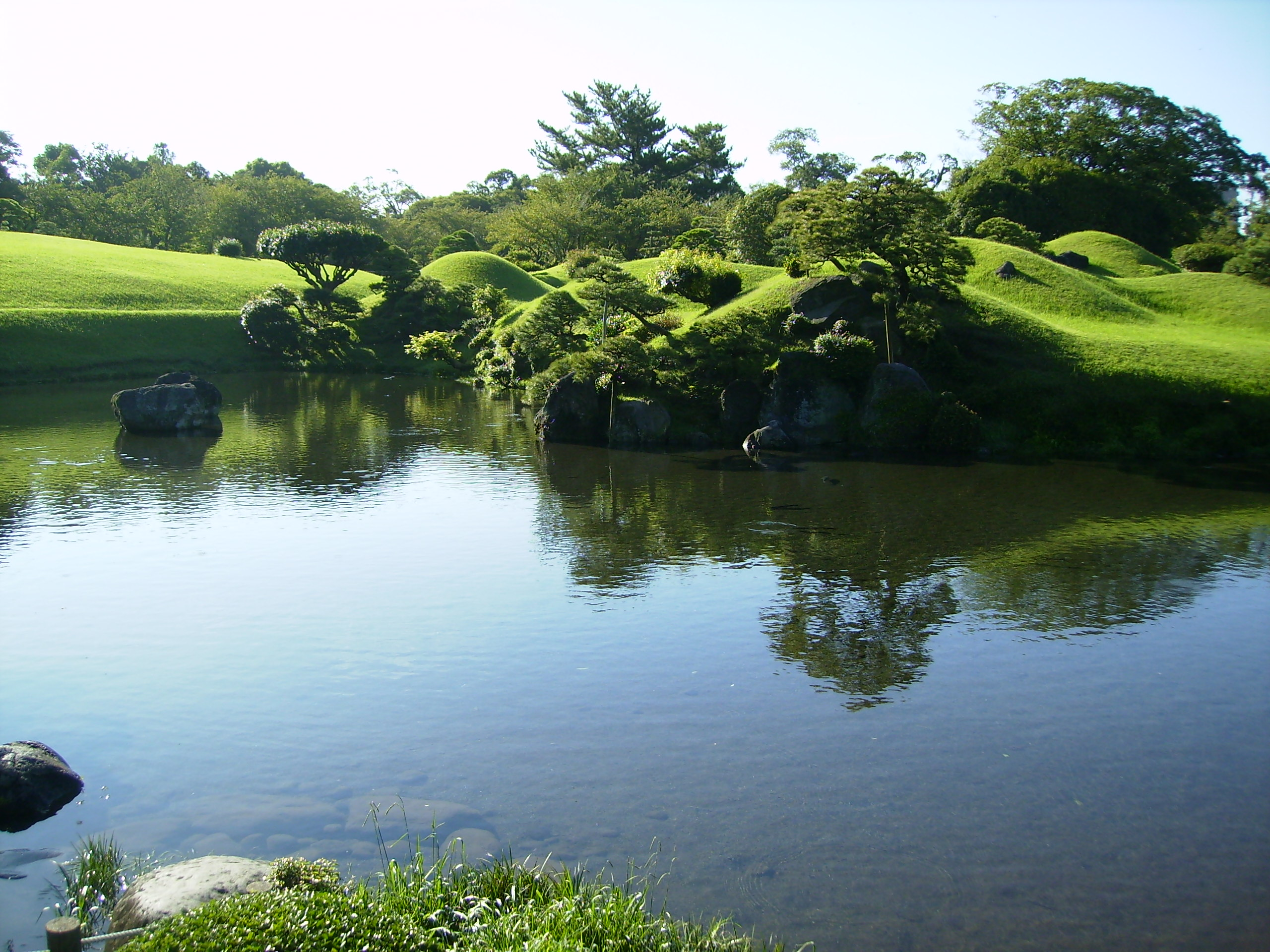
The pond

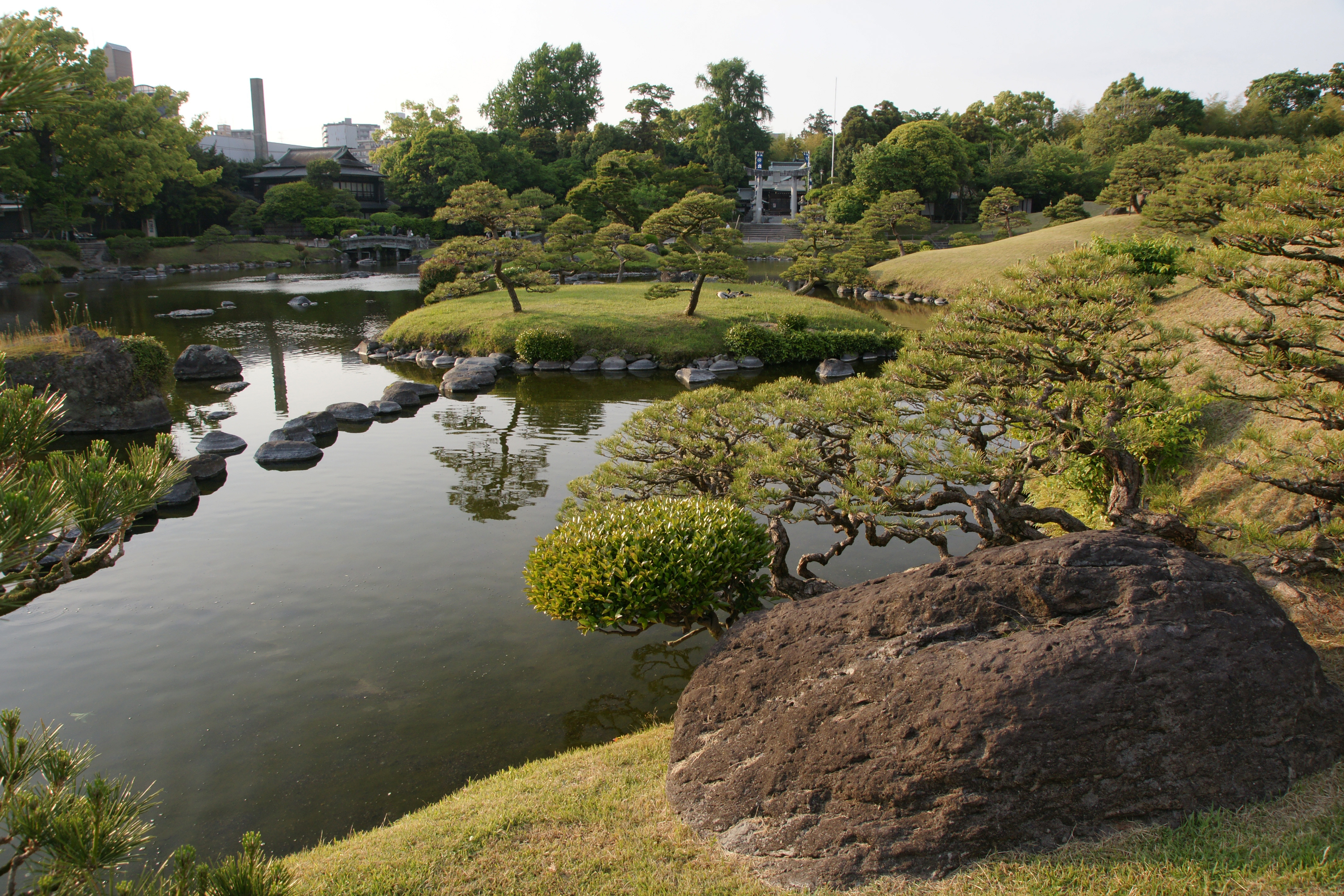
The pond

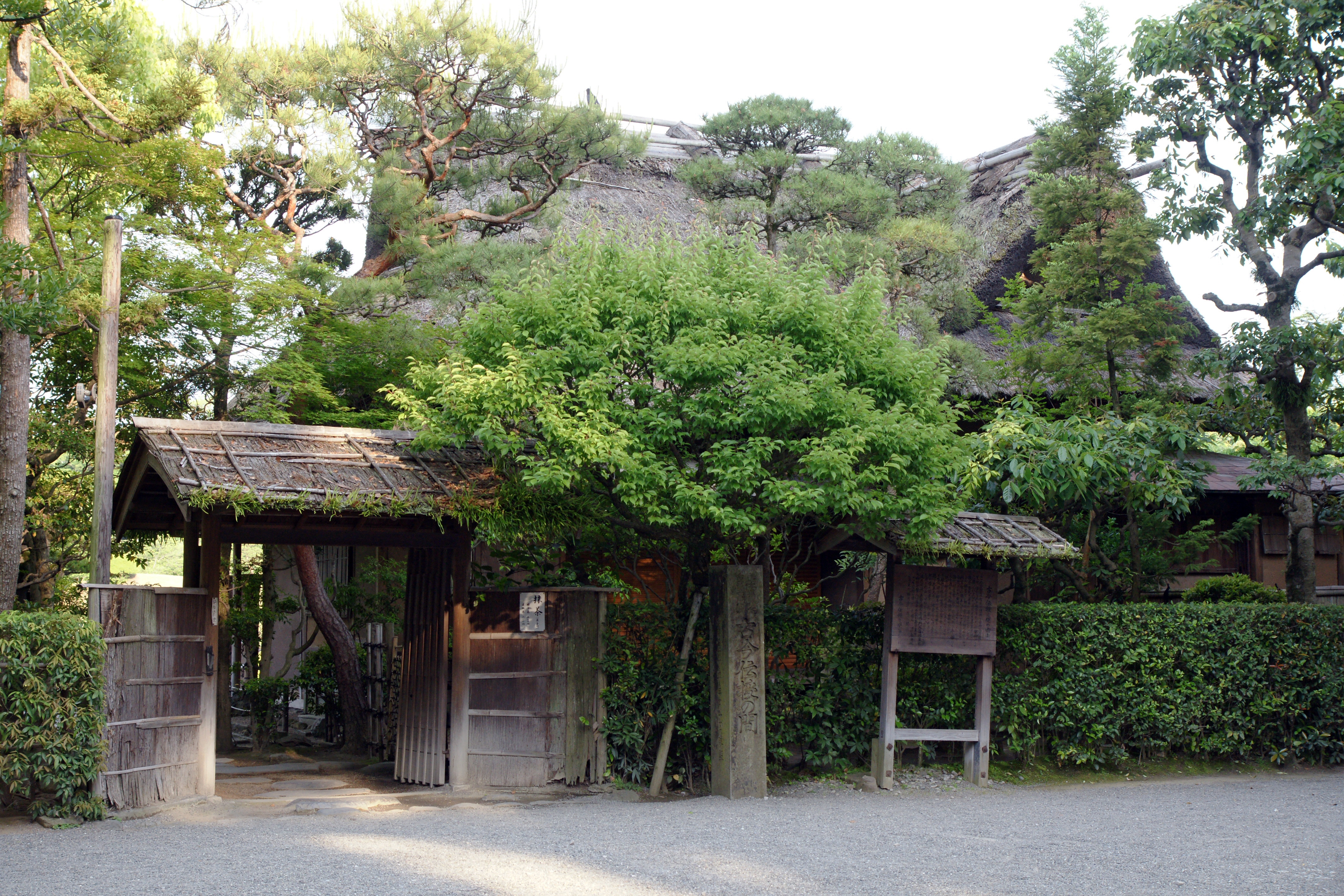
The Kokin-Denju-no-Ma teahouse

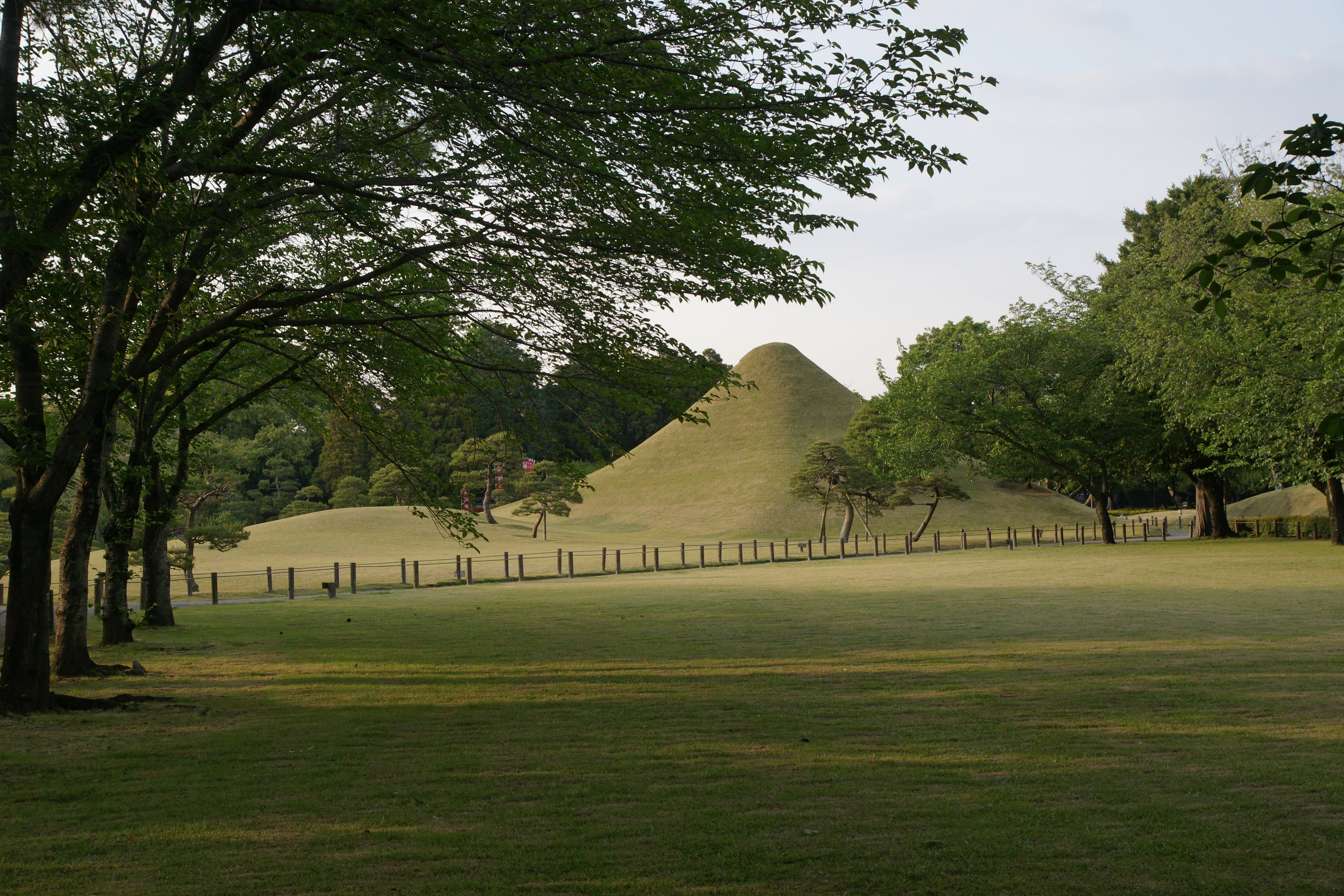
Replica of Mount Fuji

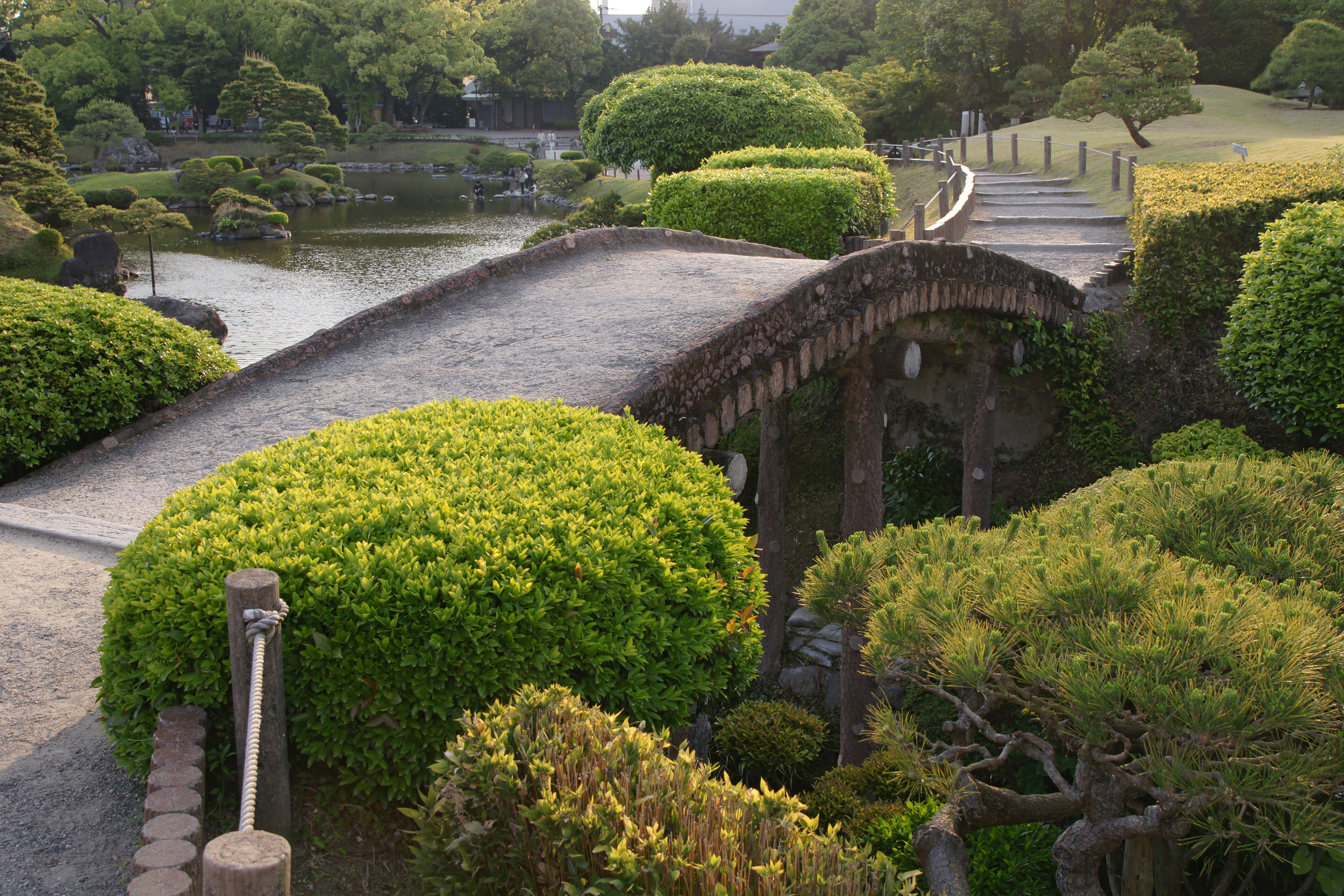
An arched bridge

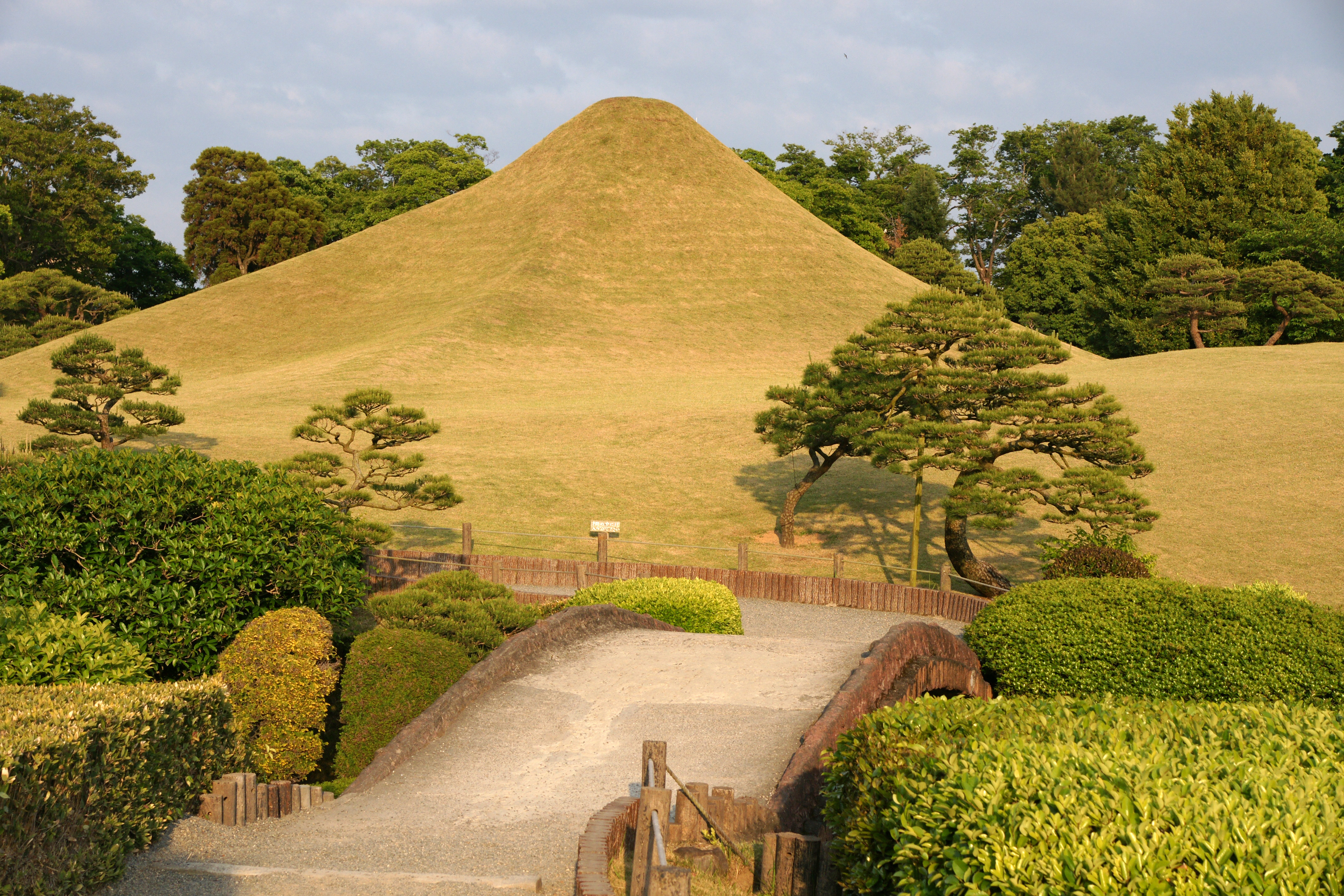
Replica of Mount Fuji

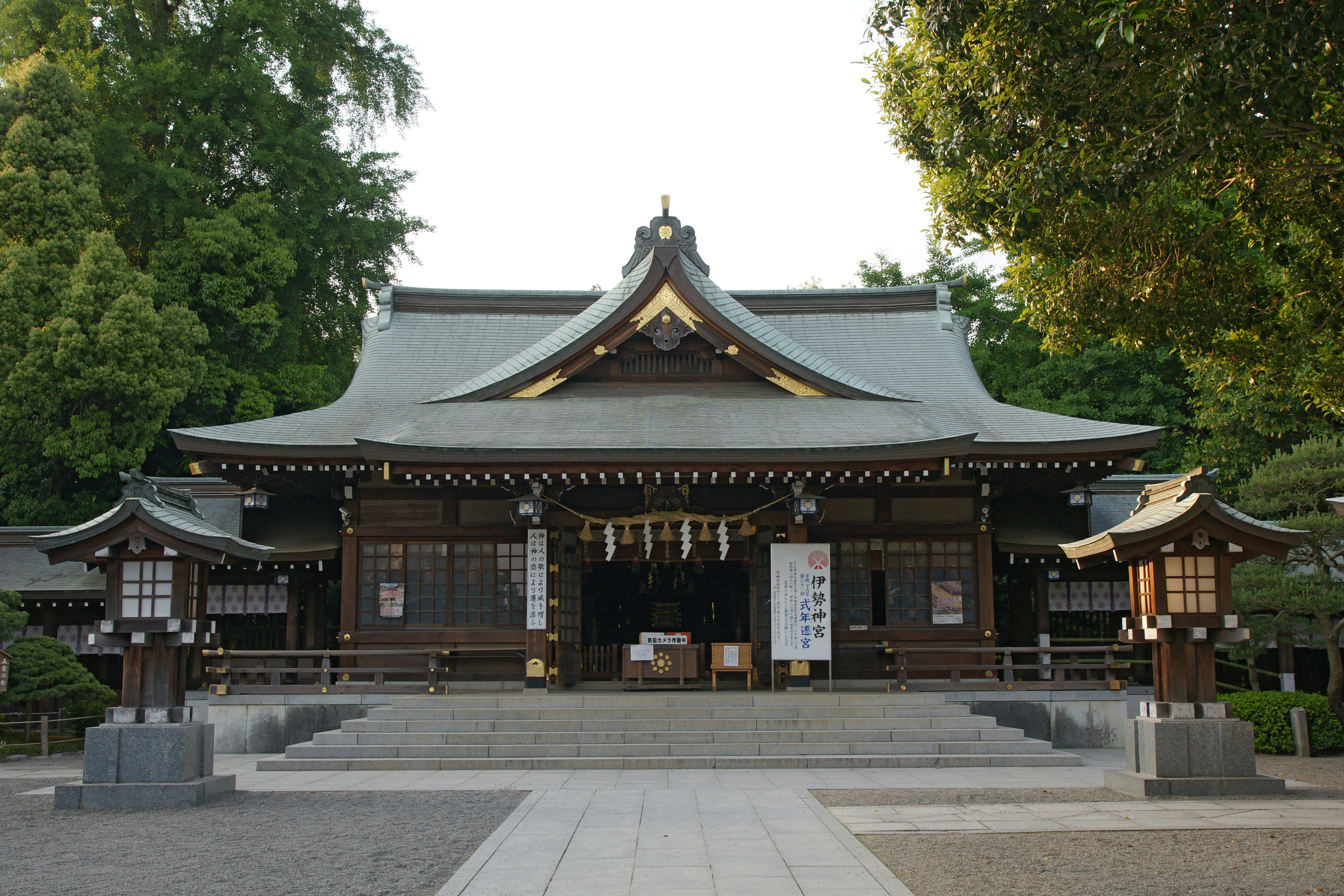
Izumi Shrine

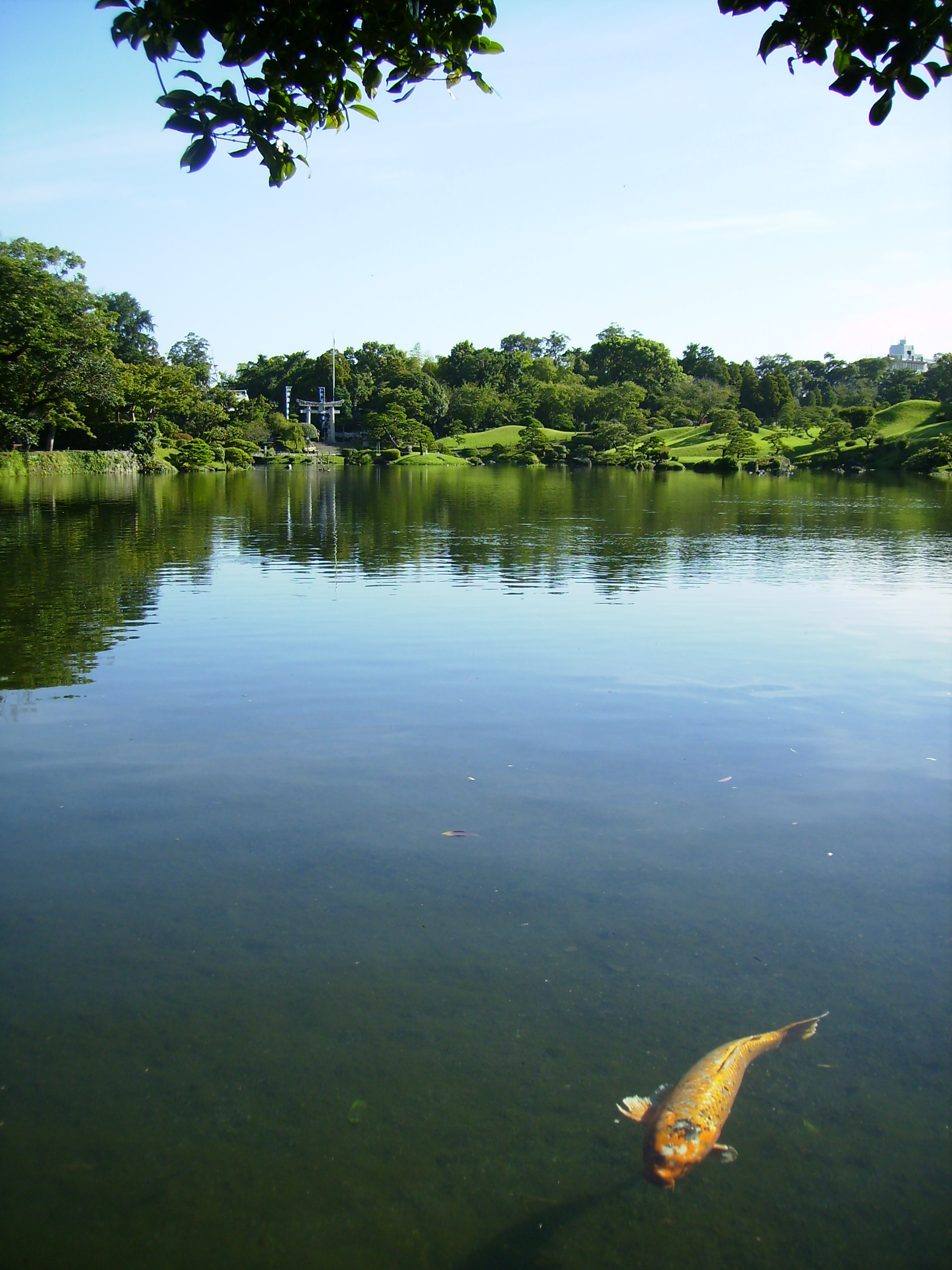
A large carp in the park

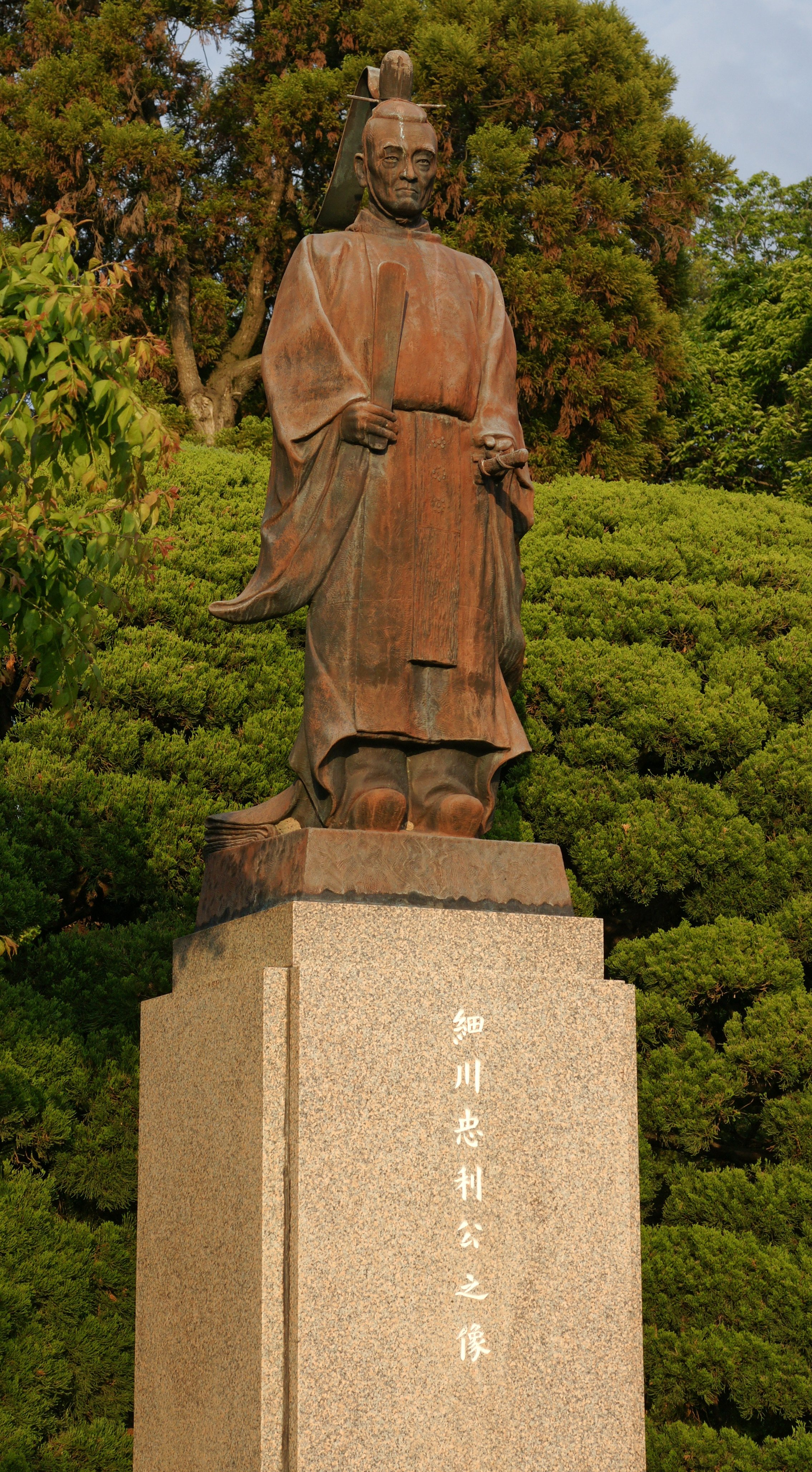
Statue of Hosokawa Tadatoshi

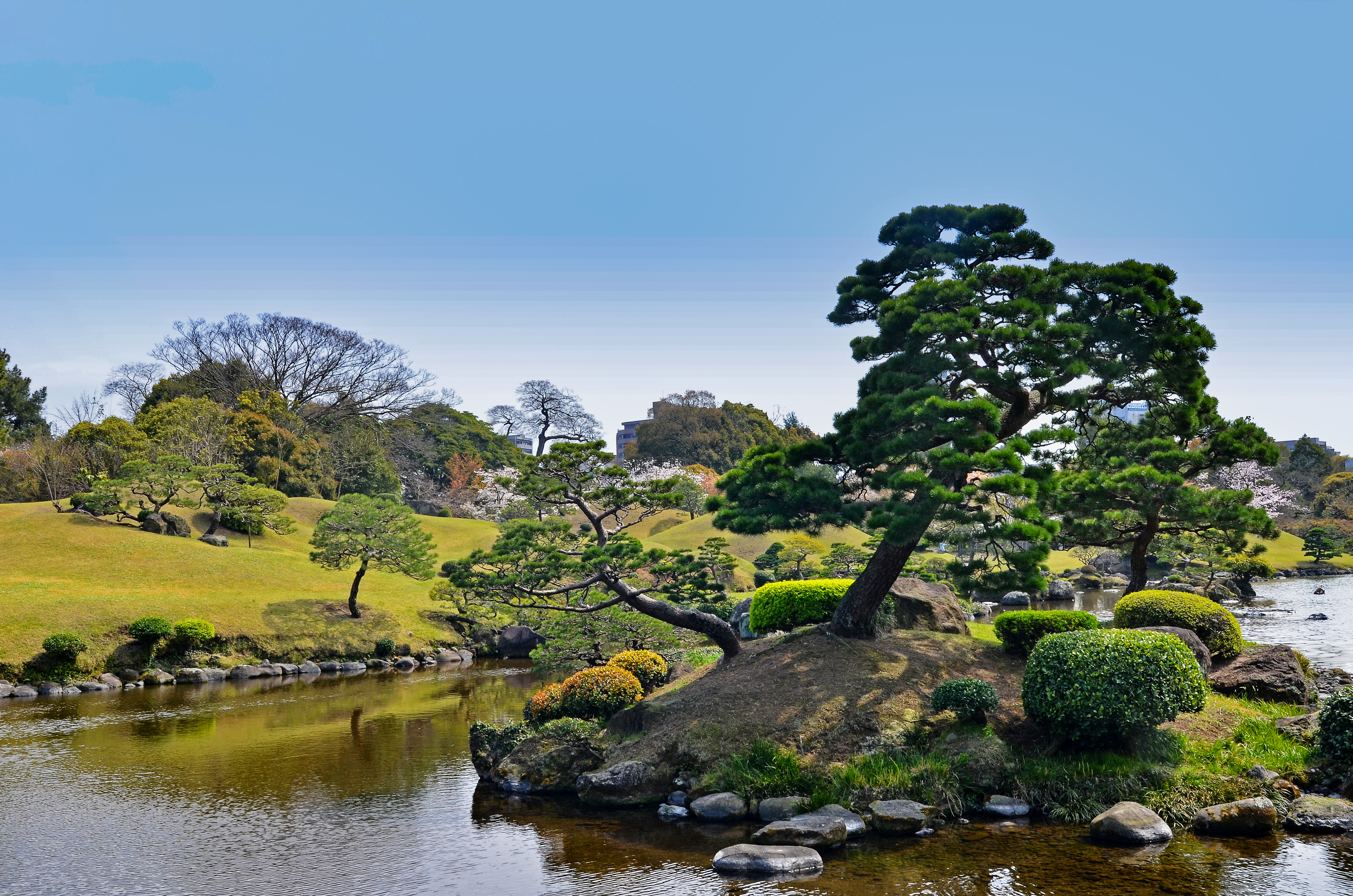
Japanese pine on a miniature island

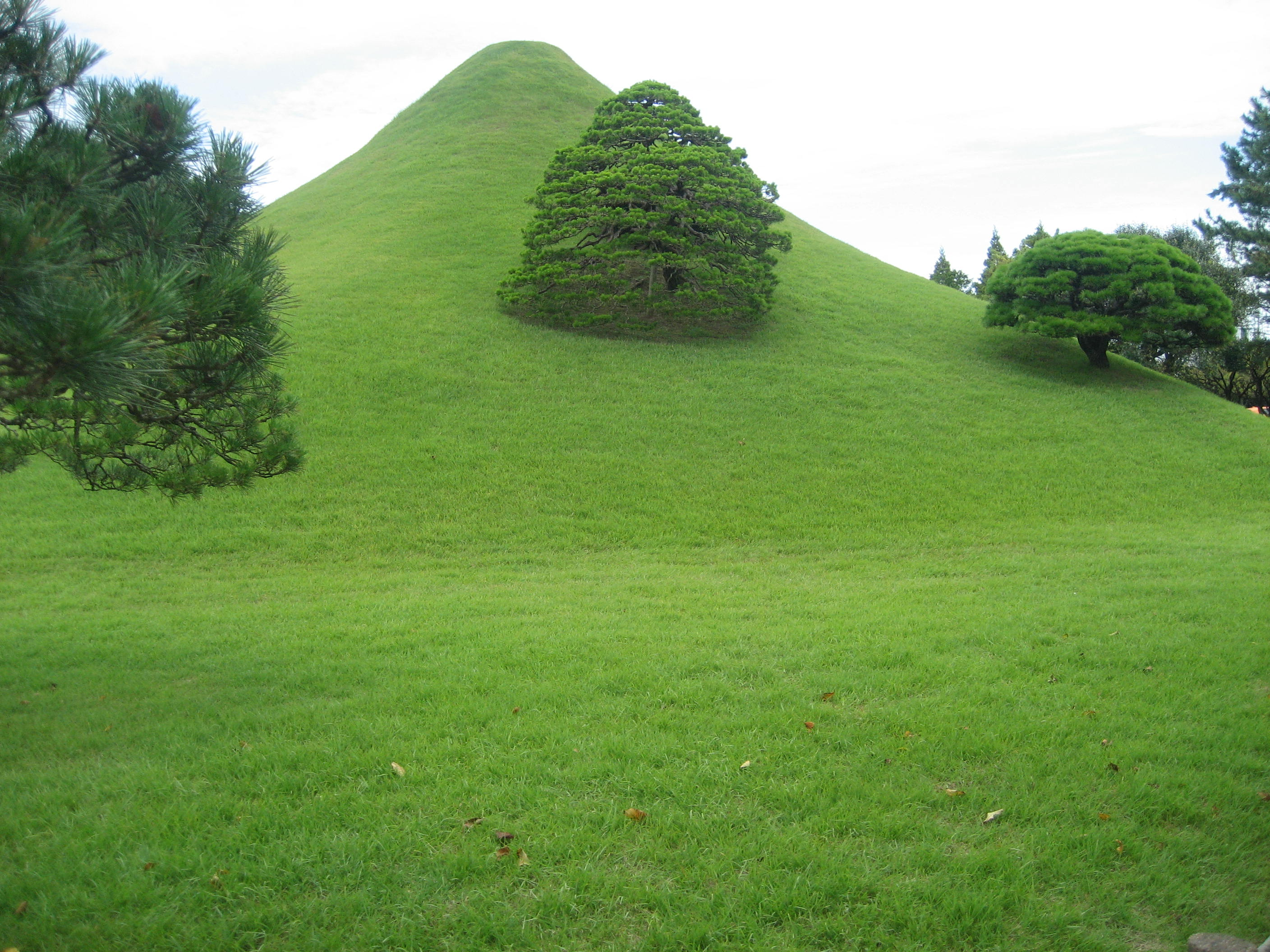
Tha garden in Spring time

== See also ==
- List of Places of Scenic Beauty of Japan (Kumamoto)
- List of Historic Sites of Japan (Kumamoto)
