= Kumamoto Prefectural Ancient Burial Mound Museum =

Museum in Kumamoto, Japan

Coordinates: 32°59′37″N 130°40′11″E

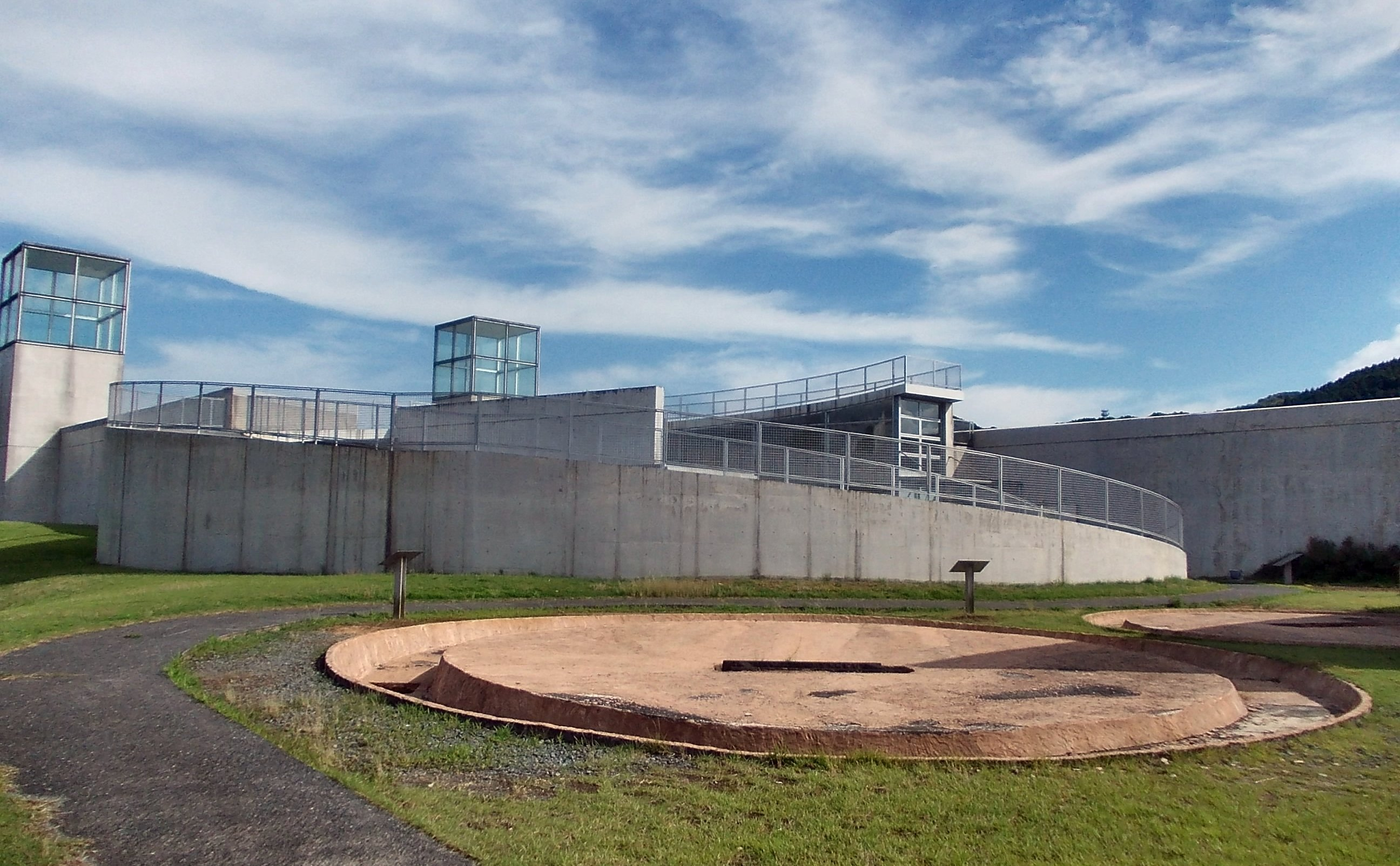
Kumamoto Prefectural Ancient Burial Mound Museum

Kumamoto Prefectural Ancient Burial Mound Museum (熊本県立装飾古墳館, Kumamoto kenritsu sōshoku kofun-kan) is a museum of decorated kofun in Yamaga, Kumamoto Prefecture, Japan. The collection includes full-size replicas of the inner chambers of twelve tumuli.

The museum was designed by Tadao Ando and completed at a cost of ¥1.6 bn in April 1992.

== See also ==
- Kofun period
- Kumamoto Prefectural Museum of Art
