= Amakusa Christian Museum =

- 天草市立天草キリシタン館
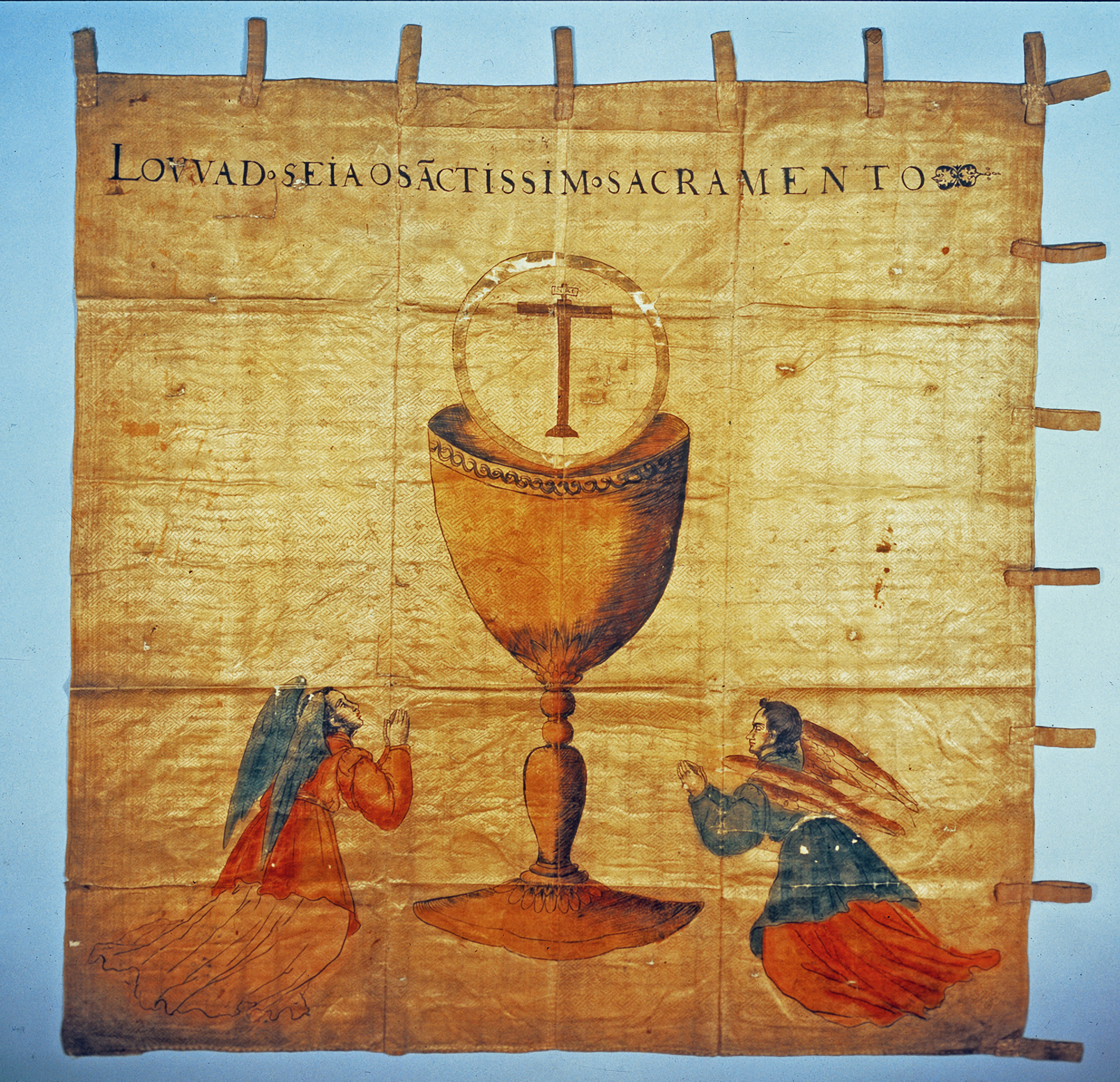
- Banner of Amakusa Shirō in the Shimabara Rebellion (ICP)
- Interactive map of the Amakusa Christian Museum area

General information
- Location: 19−52 Funenoomachi, Amakusa, Kumamoto Prefecture, Japan
- Coordinates: 32°27′36″N 130°11′03″E
- Opened: 1965

Website
- ja

Amakusa Christian Museum (天草市立天草キリシタン館, Amakusa shiritsu Amakusa kirishitankan) opened in Amakusa, Japan, in 1966 and in March 2014 received its four millionth visitor. The museum includes exhibits relating to the Shimabara Rebellion and Kakure kirishitan ('hidden Christians').

== See also ==
- Kirishitan
- Christianity in Japan
