= Eisei Bunko Museum =

Art museum in Tokyo, Japan

Coordinates: 35°42′47″N 139°43′24″E

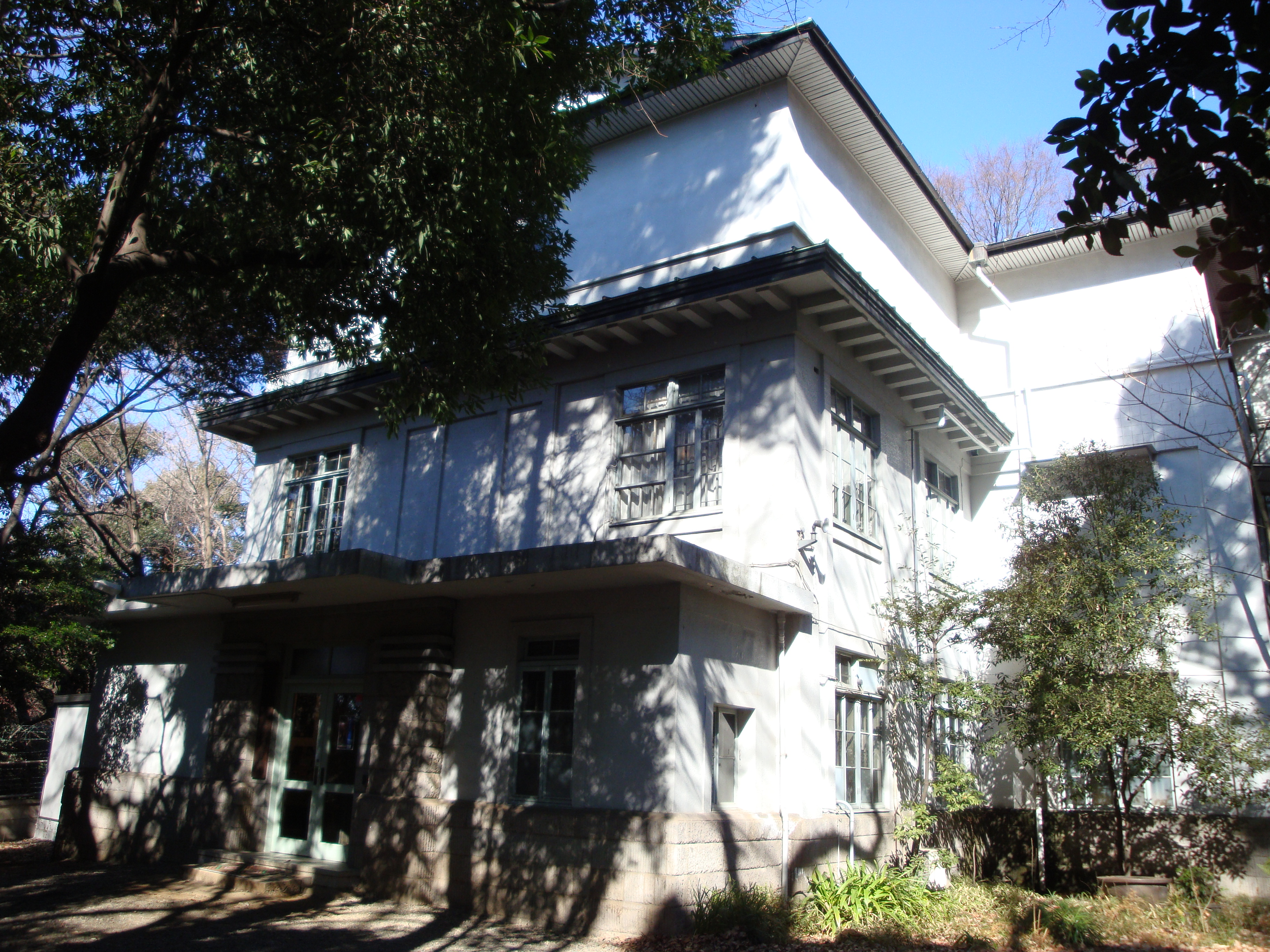
Eisei Bunko Museum

The Eisei Bunko Museum (永青文庫, Eisei Bunko) is a museum in Bunkyo in Tokyo, Japan. Its collection includes historical documents and artifacts, and works of fine art. The museum is located what was formerly the grounds of the Hosokawa clan, near the Shin-Edogawa Garden.

== History ==
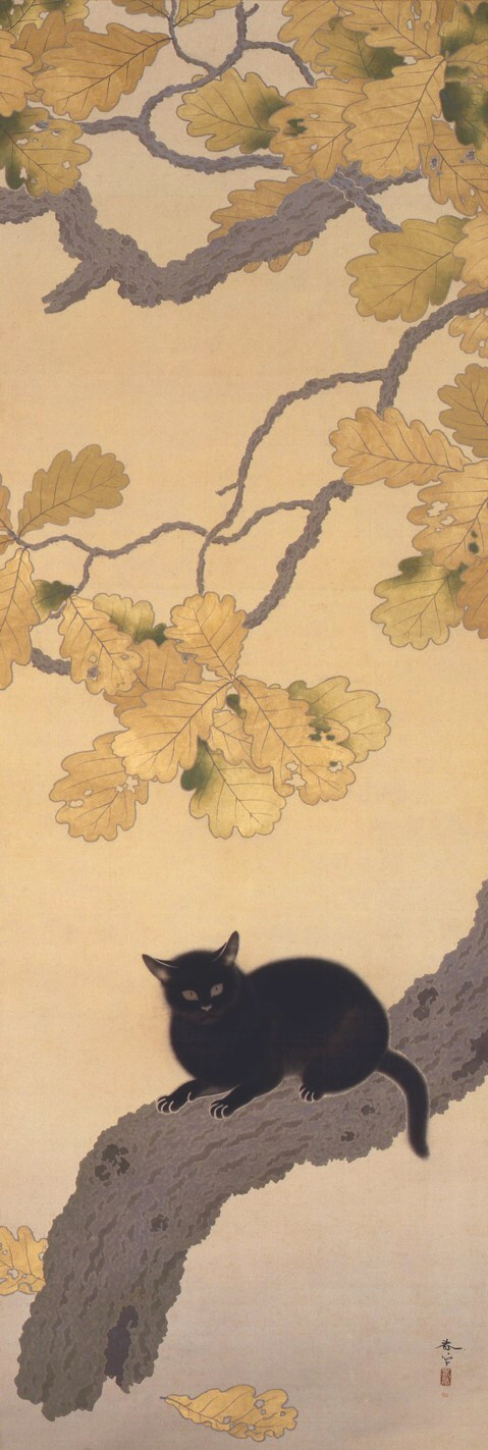
Black Cat by Hishida Shunsō

The Eisei-Bunko (Eisei Archive) is a collection of important art objects acquired and passed down in the Hosokawa family, a daimyō of 540 thousand-goku (one of the five top daimyōs) in Higo, the present day Kumamoto in Kyushu. The collection has been in existence since the Nanboku-chō Era or the 14th century and is noted for possessing close to 112 thousands objects.

In 1950, the archive was turned into a foundation and a public museum was opened in 1973. Currently the display at the museum is rearranged three times a year at which occasion special events are organized for its members.

== Collection ==
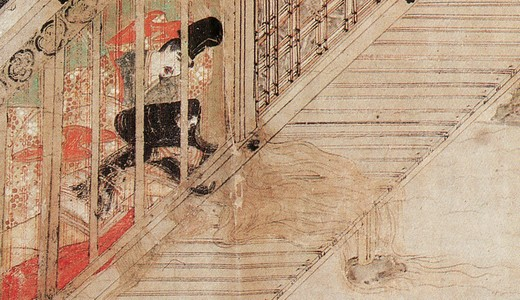
Handscrolls of Ki Haseo, Kamakura period

The collection is estimated to contain over a hundred thousand rare and old documents, scrolls, paintings, etc. and approximately 6,000 objects of art, including crafts, modern paintings and sculptures acquired here and abroad. The exact size of the archive is unknown. The archive materials have been placed in the care of Kumamoto University for analysis while art objects are being exhibited at the museum in parts as they are catalogued.

== See also ==
- List of National Treasures of Japan (archaeological materials)
- List of National Treasures of Japan (crafts-others)
- List of National Treasures of Japan (crafts-swords)
