= Kumamoto Prefectural Museum of Art =

Museum in Kumamoto, Japan

Coordinates: 32°48′27.1″N 130°42′1.9″E

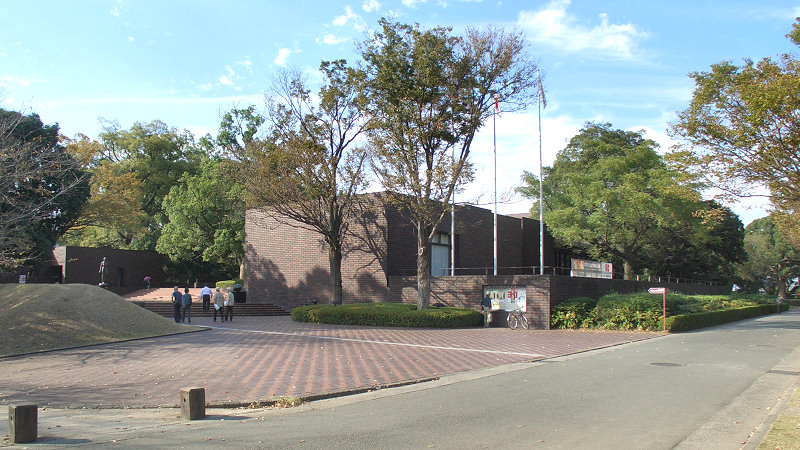

Kumamoto Prefectural Museum of Art (熊本県立美術館, Kumamoto Kenritsu Bijutsukan) opened in the precincts of Kumamoto Castle, Kumamoto, Japan in 1976. It is one of Japan's many museums which are supported by a prefecture.

The permanent collection focuses on the art and crafts of Kumamoto Prefecture and also contains works by Renoir and Rodin. One room is dedicated to replicas of decorated kofun found in the prefecture.

== See also ==
- Kumamoto Prefectural Ancient Burial Mound Museum
- Prefectural museum
