= Daibō Kofun =

Kofun period keyhole-shaped burial mound in Japan

- 大坊古墳 (Japanese)
- Daibō Kofun Daibō Kofun (Japan)
- 32°56′55″N 130°34′14″E
- Type: Kofun
- Periods: Kofun period
- Location: Tamana, Kumamoto, Japan
- Region: Kansai region

History
- Built: c.6th century

Site notes
- Public access: Yes (no facilities)
- National Historic Site of Japan

The Daibō Kofun (大坊古墳) is a Kofun period keyhole-shaped burial mound, located in the Tamana neighborhood of the city of Tamana, Kumamoto, Japan. The tumulus was designated a National Historic Site of Japan in 1977.

== Overview ==
The Daibō Kofun is a zenpō-kōen-fun (前方後円墳), which is shaped like a keyhole, having one square end and one circular end, when viewed from above. It is located on the right bank of the Kikuchi River, which flows into the Ariake Sea, at the end of a hill that runs from east-to-west. It is orientated to the west, and has a multi-chamber horizontal-entry stone burial chamber that opens from the center of the posterior circular rear portion to the south. The total length of the tomb is about 40 meters (estimated original length: 54 meters), with a 20-meter diameter circular portion, with a height of 4 meters. The tumulus was excavated in 1963, and the entire structure was revealed. The burial chamber is about six meters long; the inner chamber is 3.4 by 2.7 meters with a 2.8 height and the anterior chamber is 1.3 by 2.2 meters. The side walls are made of split andesite stone, and inside the inner chamber has an elaborate stone roof made of cut tuff. It is decorated kofun with triangular and circular patterns on both sides, the inner wall, and the front door stone of the inner chamber. The decorations on the pillars of the first and second gates of the stone chamber and the large stone sarcophagus-like structure in the inner chamber are done using vermilion and ultramarine, and the stone sarcophagus in particular has numerous continuous triangular patterns arranged in five tiers, with several circular patterns within. A large number of grave goods were unearthed from the inner chamber, including straight swords, iron arrowheads, iron spears, celadon bowls, gilt bronze rings, gold rings, and tubular beads, while apricot leaves, stirrups, knives, decorative metal fittings, and Sue ware pottery were unearthed from the front chamber. Based on the variety of excavated items, the tumulus is believed to have been built in the mid-6th century.

The tomb is currently sealed off by a conservation facility, but is open to the public twice a year (October and March).. Approximately 500 meters to the northeast are the Eianji Higashi Kofun and Eianji Nishi Kofun, which are also decorated kofun and separate National Historic Site.

The Daibō Kofun is about 850 meters northwest of Shin-Tamana Station on the Kyushu Shinkansen.

== See also ==
- List of Historic Sites of Japan (Kumamoto)
- Decorated kofun
