= Ishinukinagi Cave Tomb Cluster =

Archaeological site in Japan

Ishinukinagi Cave Tombs
- 石貫ナギノ横穴群 (Japanese)
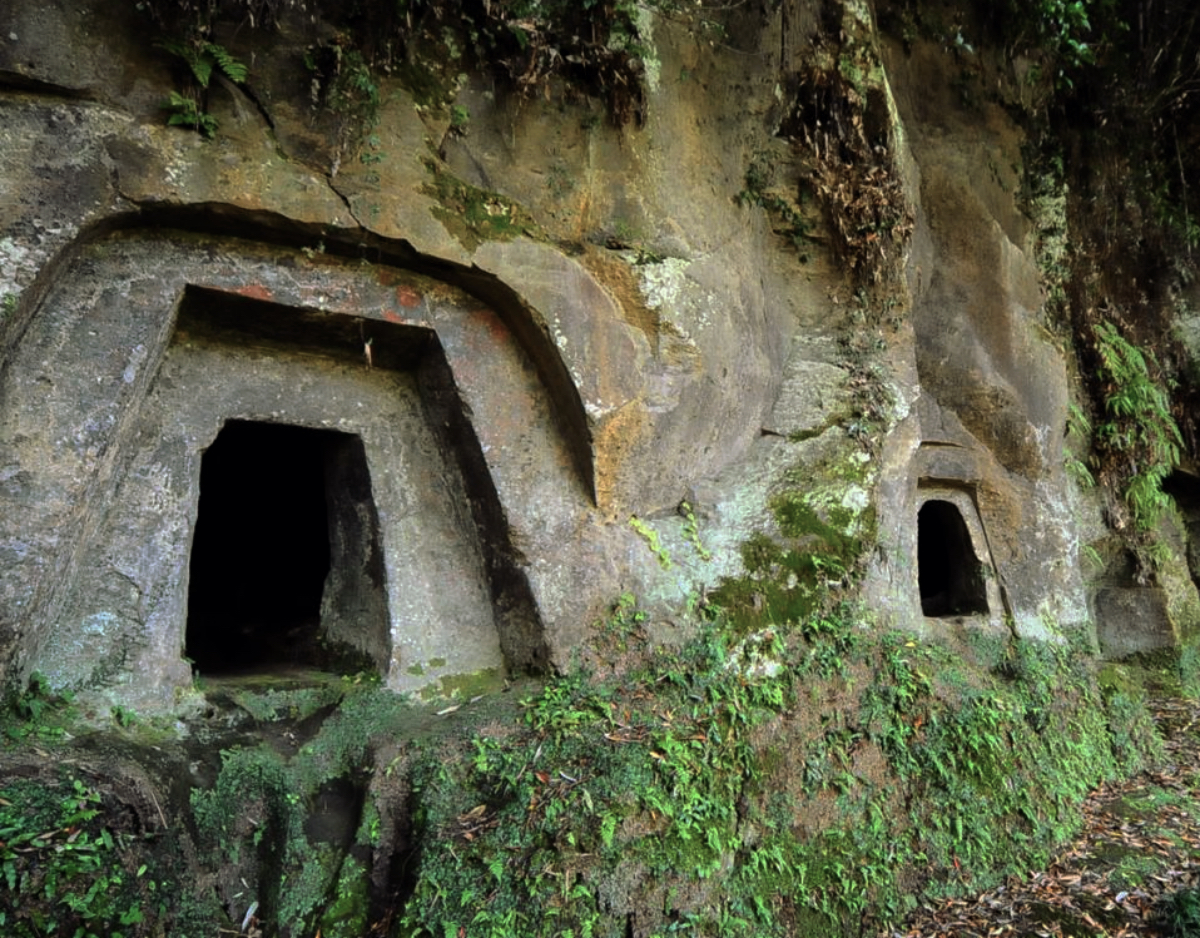
- Ishinukinagi Cave Tombs

- Ishinukinagi Cave Tombs Ishinukinagi Cave Tomb Cluster (Japan)
- Interactive map of Ishinukinagi Cave Tombs
- 32°58′03″N 130°33′53″E
- Type: 横穴墓 (yokoanabo)
- Location: Tamana, Kumamoto, Japan
- Region: Kyushu

Site notes
- Public access: Yes

The Ishinukinagi Cave Tombs (石貫ナギノ横穴群, Ishinukinagi no yokoana-gun) is an archaeological site containing 45 Kofun period yokoanabo (横穴墓), tunnel tombs in artificial caves, located in the Ishinuki neighborhood of the city of Tamana, Kumamoto, Japan. It was granted protection as a National Historic Site in 1921.

== Overview ==
The Ishinukinagi Cave Tombs are located about 5 kilometers north from the urban center of Tamana on a seven-meter cliff face of Mount Aso tuff that continues on the right bank of the middle reaches of the Hanegi River for approximately 250 meters. There are 45 cave tombs on the eastern side of the cliff, clustered into groups of as many as 14 and as few as 3, and they vary in size. Along with neighboring Ishinuki Anakannon Cave Tombs, they reflect the continental characteristics of the area after the introduction of Buddhism into Japan. The highest tombs are located 5 meters above ground, and the lower ones are mostly buried underground. Most of the entrances have double or triple arches or are trapezoidal with rounded corners. Inside, continuous patterns such as concentric circles, triangles, circles, and diamonds are engraved into the walls and are painted with red pigment. Some of the interior and exterior walls of the stone-roofed tomb at the back of the burial chamber are engraved with bows, arrows, and shields and are thought to be the tombs of powerful clans that held sway in this region at the end of the Kofun period.

The site is approximately 3.7 kilometers north of Shin-Tamana Station on the Kyushu Shinkansen.

== See also ==
- List of Historic Sites of Japan (Kumamoto)
- Decorated kofun
