= Nankan, Kumamoto =

Nankan 南関町
- Town
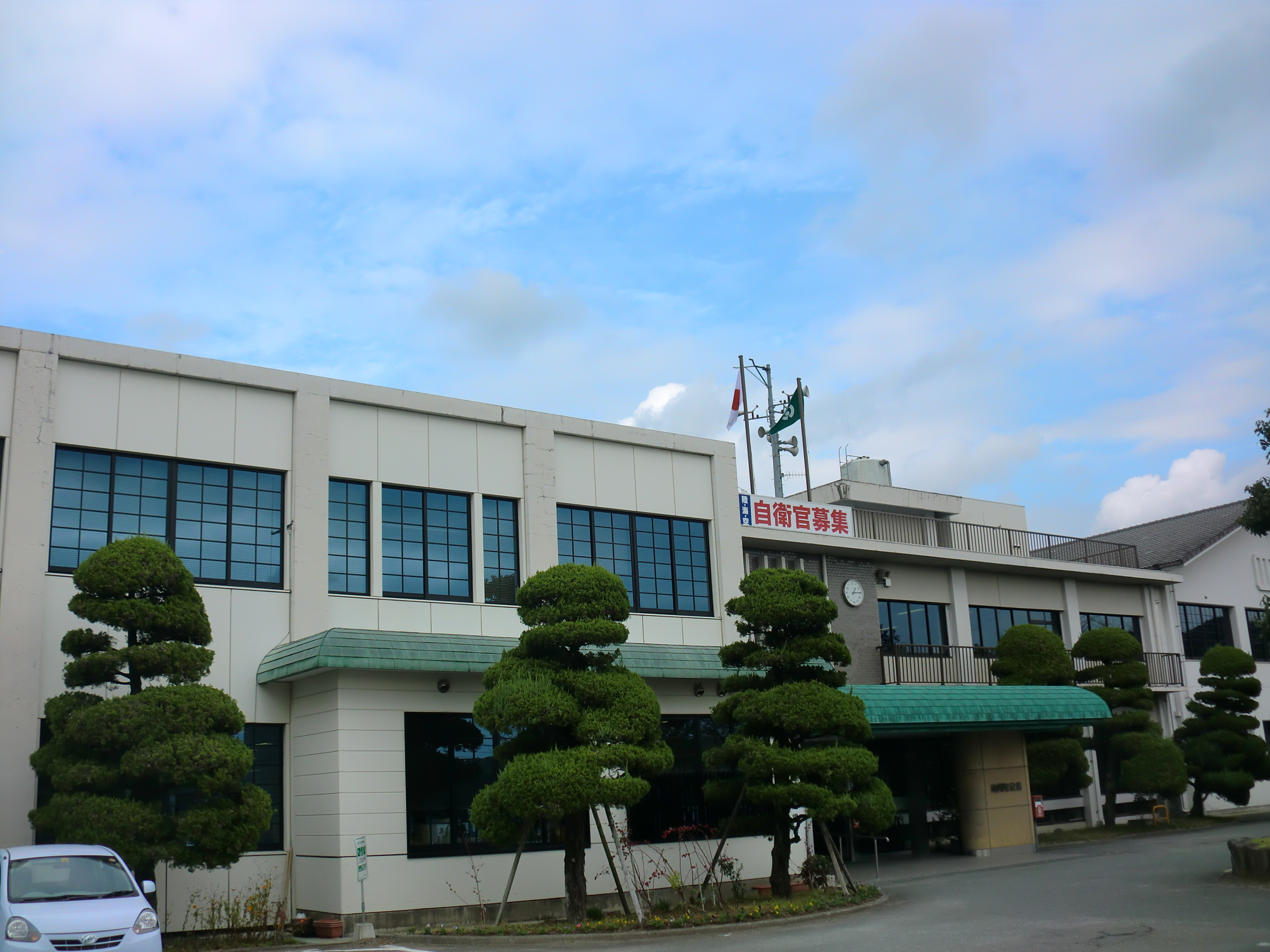
- Nankan town office

- Flag Chapter
- Location of Nankan in Kumamoto Prefecture

- Location in Japan
- Coordinates: 33°03′35″N 130°32′38″E
- Country: Japan
- Region: Kyushu
- Prefecture: Kumamoto
- District: Tamana

Area
  - Total: 68.92 km^{2} (26.61 sq mi)

Population (July 31, 2024)
  - Total: 8,741
  - Density: 126.8/km^{2} (328.5/sq mi)
- Time zone: UTC+09:00 (JST)
- City hall address: 64 Sekimachi, Minamiseki-machi, Tamana-gun, Kumamoto-ken 861-0898
- Website: Official website
- Symbols
- Flower: Rhododendron
- Tree: Fagaceae

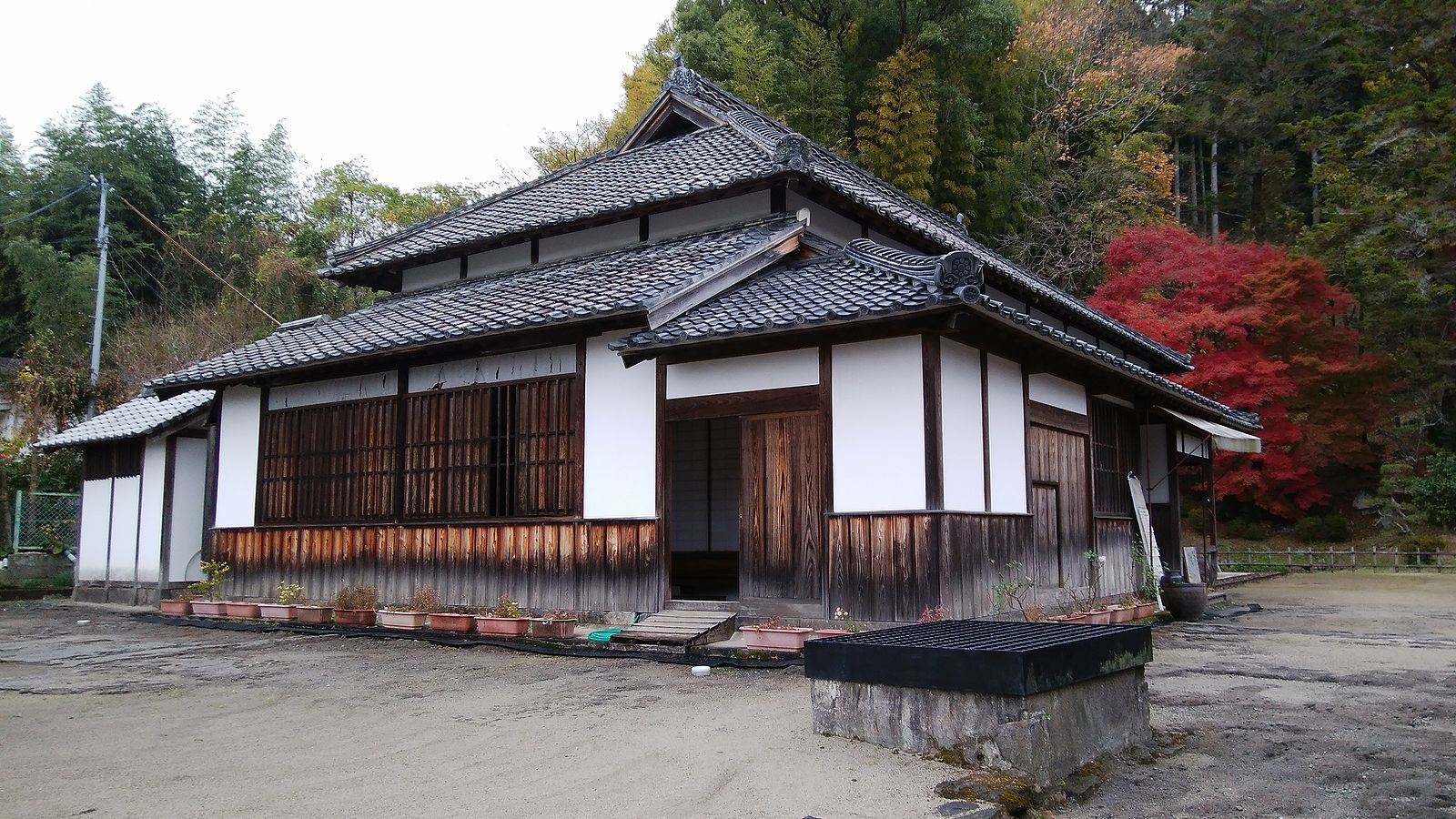
Former Nankan Ochaya

Nankan (南関町, Nankan-machi) is a town in Tamana District, Kumamoto Prefecture, Japan. As of 31 July 2024, the town had an estimated population of 8,741 in 4,075 households, and a population density of 120 persons per km^{2}. The total area of the town is 68.92 km^{2} (26.61 sq mi).

== Geography ==
Nankan is located in the northwestern tip of Kumamoto Prefecture. It borders Fukuoka Prefecture in the north and west. It is about 50 kilometers northwest of Kumamoto City.

=== Neighboring municipalities ===
Fukuoka Prefecture

- Miyama
- Ōmuta

Kumamoto Prefecture

- Arao
- Nagomi
- Tamana

=== Climate ===
Nankan has a humid subtropical climate (Köppen Cfa) characterized by warm summers and cool winters with light to no snowfall. The average annual temperature in Nankan is 16.9 °C. The average annual rainfall is 1932 mm with September as the wettest month. The temperatures are highest on average in August, at around 26.9 °C, and lowest in January, at around 6.0 °C.

=== Demographics ===
Per Japanese census data, the population of Nankan is as shown below

Historical population
| Year | Pop. | ±% |
|---|---|---|
| 1960 | 17,679 | — |
| 1970 | 14,278 | −19.2% |
| 1980 | 12,498 | −12.5% |
| 1990 | 12,247 | −2.0% |
| 2000 | 11,821 | −3.5% |
| 2010 | 10,564 | −10.6% |
| 2020 | 8,979 | −15.0% |

== History ==
The area of Nankan was part of ancient Higo Province, and developed as a post town and barrier gate guarding the northern border Higo from the Nara period. During the Edo Period it was part of the holdings of Kumamoto Domain. After the Meiji restoration, the town of Nankan was established with the creation of the modern municipalities system on April 1, 1889.

== Government ==
Nankan has a mayor-council form of government with a directly elected mayor and a unicameral town council of 12 members. Nankan, collectively with the other municipalities of Tamana District, contributes one member to the Kumamoto Prefectural Assembly. In terms of national politics, the town is part of the Kumamoto 2nd district of the lower house of the Diet of Japan.

== Economy ==
The local economy is based on agriculture, with rice and bamboo as the main crops.

== Education ==
Nakan has four public elementary schools and one public junior high school operated by the town government. The town does not have a high school.

== Transportation ==
=== Railways ===
The Kyushu Shinkansen passes through the western part of the town, but there is no passenger railway services within the town. The nearest train stations are JR Kyushu's Shinkansen Shin-Omuta Station or the Kagoshima Main Line's Ginsui Station.

=== Highways ===
- Kyushu Expressway
- National Route 443

== Notable people from Nankan ==
- Kunio Nakagawa, Imperial Japanese Army officer
