= Eta Anakannon Kofun =

- 江田穴観音古墳 (Japanese)
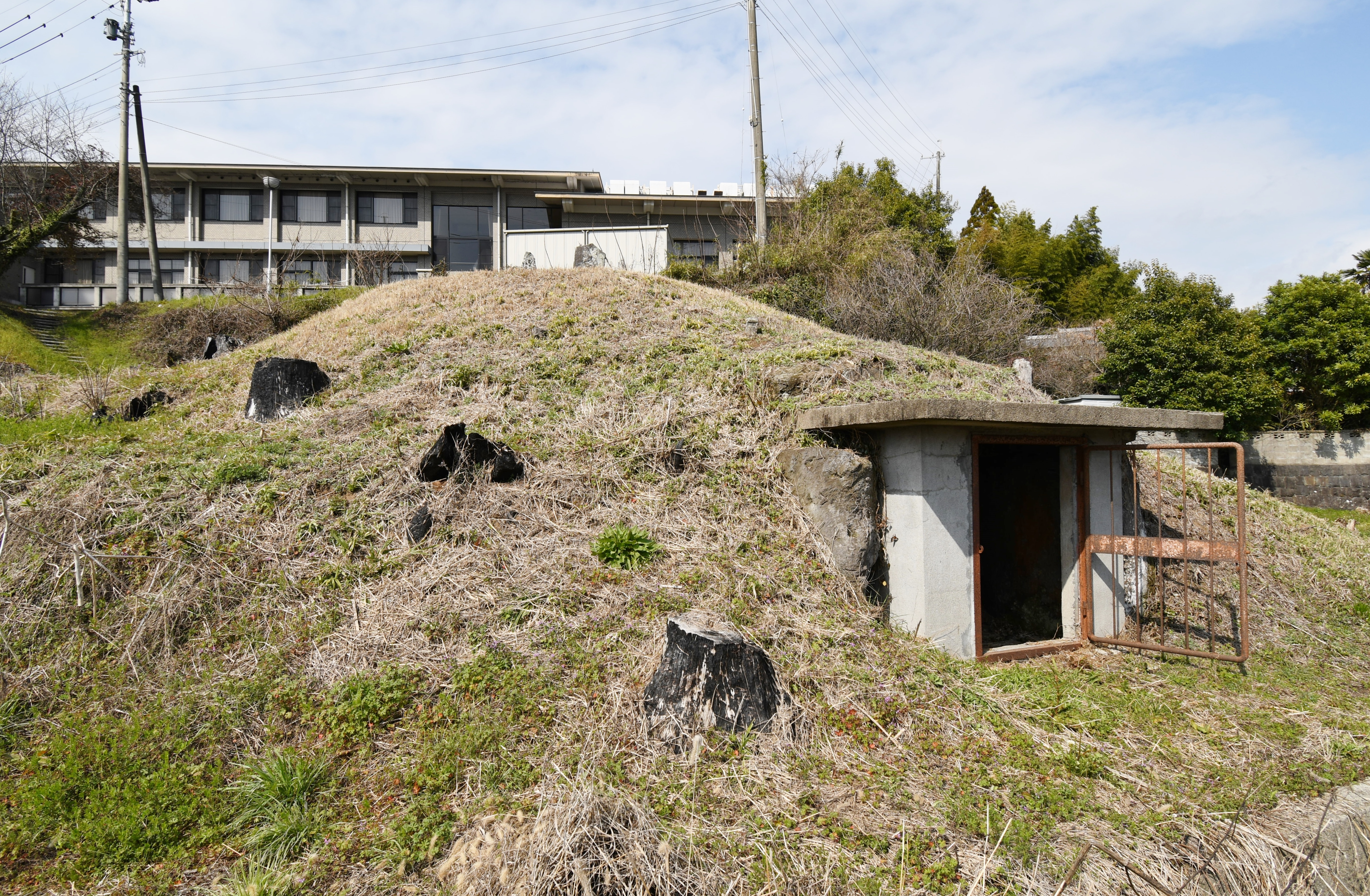
- Eta Anakannon Kofun

- Eta Anakannon Kofun Eta Anakannon Kofun (Japan)
- 32°58′36″N 130°36′21″E
- Type: Kofun
- Periods: Kofun period
- Location: Nagomi, Kumamoto, Japan
- Region: Kyushu

History
- Built: c.6th century

Site notes
- Public access: Yes (no facilities)
- National Historic Site of Japan

The Eta Anakannon kofun (江田穴観音古墳) is a late Kofun period burial mound, located in the Eta neighborhood of the town of Nagomi, Kumamoto Prefecture Japan. The tumulus was designated a National Historic Site of Japan in 1944. The name of the tomb comes from the fact that a statue of Kannon Bosatsu was enshrined in the passageway.

== Overview ==
The Eta Anakannon Kofun is an enpun (円墳) circular tumulus with a diameter of approximately 17 meters and a height of approximately 3.5 meters, with a seven-meter diameter flattened surface on the top. It is situated at an elevation of approximately 27 meters at the southern end of the Suwahara Plateau on the left bank of the downstream Kikuchi River and is located on the slope of the plateau, so its exact size is unclear. Theb tumulus contains a multi-chambered horizontal-type burial chamber consisting of a front chamber and a back chamber, with the entrance facing south-southeast. All the stone materials are monoliths of cut tuff originating from Mount Aso. Grave goods found in archaeological excavations include gold rings, glass magatama, gilt bronze apricot leaves which were part of a horse harness, and fragments of Sue ware pottery, from which the tumulus is estimated to have been built in the late 6th century.

Because fires have been lit in the rear chamber for many years, both the rear chamber and the front chamber are covered in soot, making it difficult to see the decorations on the stone chamber walls, but decorative patterns made with red pigments have been found in the passageway, indicating that this was originally a decorated kofun. Traces of a decorative border remain on the front of the second entrance gate (antechamber).The tumulus was constructed for multiple burials. In the rear chamber, three platforms for coffins are arranged in a U-shape, and in the front chamber, two platforms were located to the left and right.

The Nagomi Town History and Folklore Museum is located nearby.

== See also ==
- List of Historic Sites of Japan (Kumamoto)
