= Tanaka Castle (Higo Province) =

Castle ruins in Nagomi, Kumamoto, Japan

- 田中城
- Nagomi, Kumamoto Japan
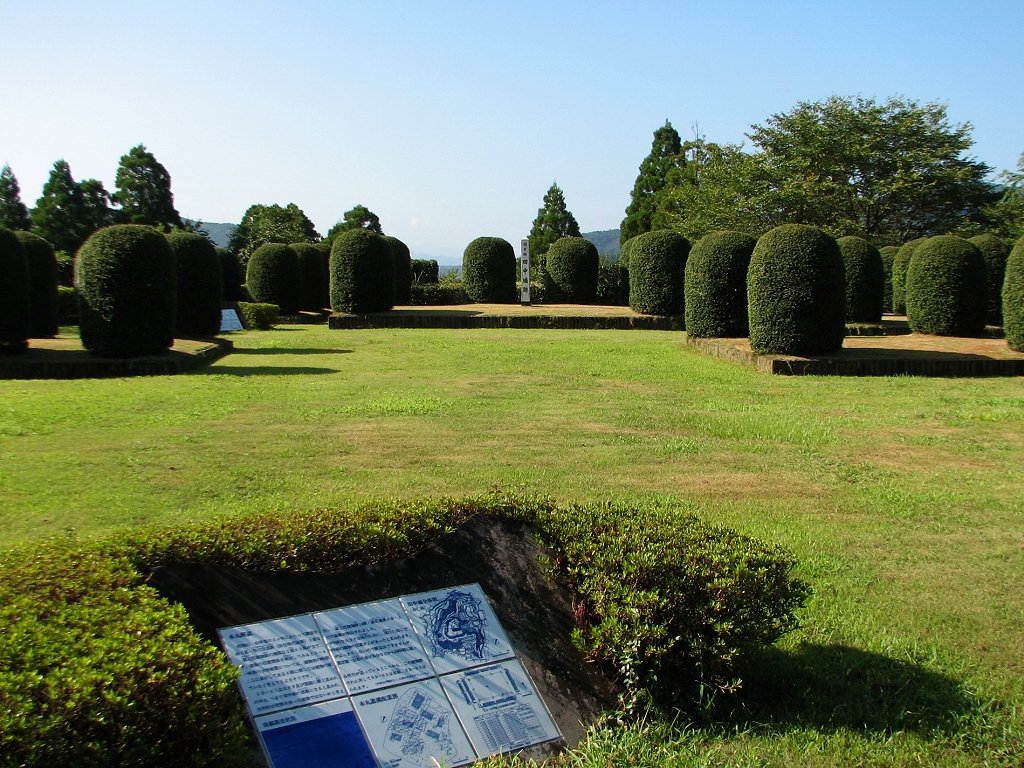
- Site of Tanaka Castle Honmaru

Site information
- Type: rinkakushiki hirayama-style Japanese castle
- Open to the public: yes
- Condition: Archaeological and designated national historical site; castle ruins

Location
- Coordinates: 33°4′44.0″N 130°35′41.0″E

Site history
- In use: Sengoku period
- National Historic Site of Japan

Tanaka Castle (田中城, Tanaka-jō) was a Sengoku period Japanese castle located in the town of Nagomi, Kumamoto Prefecture, Japan Its ruins have been protected as a National Historic Site since 2002.

== Overview ==
Tanaka Castle is located on the confluence of the Wani River and the Tomachi River, both tributaries of the Kikuchi RIver. The location controlled the main road between Fukuoka and Kumamoto, and was thus seen as the northern gateway to Higo Province. It is unknown when the castle was first constructed. This area was the stronghold of the Wani clan, and ancient clan claiming descent from Emperor Kōshō, who had controlled this area from the Kofun period. During the Muromachi period, northern Higo was under the nominal rule of the Kikuchi clan. However, since the geography was mountainous and divided into numerous small basins, many small petty warlords maintained a largely independent position. As the Kikuchi clan gradually weakened in the Sengoku period due to internal conflict, the area became contested between the Otomo clan and the Shimazu clan until the invasion of Kyushu in 1586–1587 by Toyotomi Hideyoshi. Hideyoshi gained support of the petty warlords in Higo Province by promising to maintain their existing holdings. However, Sassa Narimasa, immediately after his appointment to Kumamoto Castle began a forced land survey and redistribution of territories. This was in line with previous policies used by Oda Nobunaga in conquered territories, but not what Hideyoshi had promised. Fear loss of their local autonomy, the petty warlords of northern Higo arose in rebellion, which Sassa Narimasa was unable to suppress. This included the Wani clan, who were besieged in Tanaka clan with their retainers, the Hebaru clan. In order to maintain his prestige and authority, Hideyoshi sent an army into northern Higo with orders to annihilate the rebellion. Tanaka Castle held out against the combined forces of Mōri, Nabeshima and Tachibana clan for more than 30 days, but the Wani clan was betrayed from within by the Hebaru clan and the castle fell after 40 days. Per Hideyoshi's orders, the Wani clan was executed, were their betrayers, the Hebaru clan. Hideyoshi subsequently also ordered that Sassa Narimasa commit seppuku and his domain was given to Katō Kiyomasa.

In 1989, a drawing of the siege, "Heharuwani Shiyori Jintorizu," was discovered in the "Mori Family Library" of the Yamaguchi Prefectural Archives. It revealed the divisions and military orders of the besieging forces, and it was confirmed that the structure of the castle depicted in the drawing matched well with the results of archaeological excavations The castle ruins have a total area of about 80,000 m2, and within the main enclosure, which is about 1,700 m2, the remains of 14 post-hole buildings, a dry moat surrounding the main enclosure, a watchtower, a fence row, a well, and a castle gate have been discovered. Excavated items include a large number of ceramics such as celadon, white porcelain, and dyed porcelain; daily utensils such as mortars, fire shelters, and Haji ware pottery; military equipment such as stirrup plates, helmets, and knives; bullets and carbonized rice; and other items, concentrated in the second half of the 16th century. The site of Tanaka Castle is now a historical park, and terraces and moats of the castle remain all over the hill in various states of preservation.

== In popular culture ==
The castle is the setting for the third episode of the 2002 Kumamoto Stories directed by Takashi Miike.

== See also ==
- List of Historic Sites of Japan (Kumamoto)
- Tanaka Castle (Suruga Province)

== Literature ==
- Benesch, Oleg and Ran Zwigenberg (2019). Japan's Castles: Citadels of Modernity in War and Peace. Cambridge: Cambridge University Press. p. 374. ISBN 9781108481946.
- De Lange, William (2021). An Encyclopedia of Japanese Castles. Groningen: Toyo Press. pp. 600 pages. ISBN 978-9492722300.
