= Tensui, Kumamoto =

Dissolved municipality in Kumamoto prefecture, Japan

Tensui (天水町, Tensui-machi) was a town located in Tamana District, Kumamoto Prefecture, Japan.

As of 2003, the town had an estimated population of 6,918 and the density of 322.07 persons per km^{2}. The total area was 21.48 km^{2}.

On October 3, 2005, Tensui, along with the towns of Taimei and Yokoshima (all from Tamana District), was merged into the expanded city of Tamana and no longer exists as an independent municipality.
