= Eianji Higashi Kofun - Eianji Nishi Kofun =

Eianji Higashi Kofun・Eianji Nishi Kofun
- 永安寺東古墳・永安寺西古墳 (Japanese)
- Eianji Higashi Kofun・Eianji Nishi Kofun Eianji Higashi Kofun - Eianji Nishi Kofun (Japan)
- 32°57′06″N 130°34′36″E
- Type: Kofun
- Periods: Kofun period
- Location: Tamana, Kumamoto, Japan
- Region: Kyushu

Site notes
- Public access: Yes (no facilities)
- National Historic Site of Japan

The Eianji Higashi Kofun・Eianji Nishi Kofun (永安寺東古墳・永安寺西古墳) are a pair Kofun period burial mounds, located in the Tamana neighborhood of the city of Tamana, Kumamoto. The tumuli were designated a National Historic Site of Japan in 1992.

== Overview ==
The Eianji kofun are located at the foot of a hill overlooking the alluvial plain on the right bank of the Kikuchi River in northern Kumamoto Prefecture. The site takes is name from the ruins of a Buddhist temple called Eian-ji, which is located about 40 meters away. They are thought to have been built between the end of the 6th century and the first half of the 7th century.

The Eianji Higashi Kofun is a decorated kofun. Although most of the mound has been lost, it is believed to have been an enpun (円墳)-style circular tumulus with a horizontal-entry stone burial chamber with an opening to the southeast. Only a portion of the antechamber and burial chamber proper remain. The main burial chamber is 2.6 meters long, 2.4 meters wide, and 2.7 meters high and was made of huge monoliths of processed lava from Mount Aso with a stone roof. The walls have triangular engraved lines, suggesting that it was painted. The antechamber is currently 1.6 meters long, 2.3 meters wide and 1.6 meters high, and shallow vertical lines have been carved into two stones on either side of the back wall, with continuous triangular patterns carved into the left and right sides and painted red. Circular patterns and patterns that appear to be boats and horses are also painted on the left and right side walls.

The Eianji Nishi Kofun is also thought to be a small circular tumulus, and the stone chamber is 3.4 meters long, 2.8 meters wide and 3 meters high, constructed on three sides from a single megalithic stone, with the stone roof of the back wall and parts of the paving stones remaining. It is also orientated to the south. Three rows of circular patterns are carved into the back wall and both side walls, and red paint remains in some places.

At Eianji Nishi Tomb, construction was carried out to cover the entire mound and stone chamber with a large dome-shaped roof for protection. At Eianji Higashi Tomb, the stone chamber has been partially restored and a protective structure made of reinforced concrete has been installed, and visitors can now tour the site. The site is about 1.4 kilometers northeast of Shin-Tamana Station on the Kyushu Shinkansen.

== See also ==
- List of Historic Sites of Japan (Kumamoto)
- Decorated kofun
