= Mikawa, Kumamoto =

Former town in Kumamoto prefecture, Japan

Mikawa (三加和町, Mikawa-machi) was a town located in Tamana District, Kumamoto Prefecture, Japan.

As of 2003, the town had an estimated population of 5,533 and a density of 91.48 persons per km^{2}. The total area was 60.48 km^{2}.

On March 1, 2006, Mikawa, along with the town of Kikusui (also from Tamana District), was merged to create the town of Nagomi and no longer exists as an independent municipality.
