= Tonkararin Tunnel Structure =

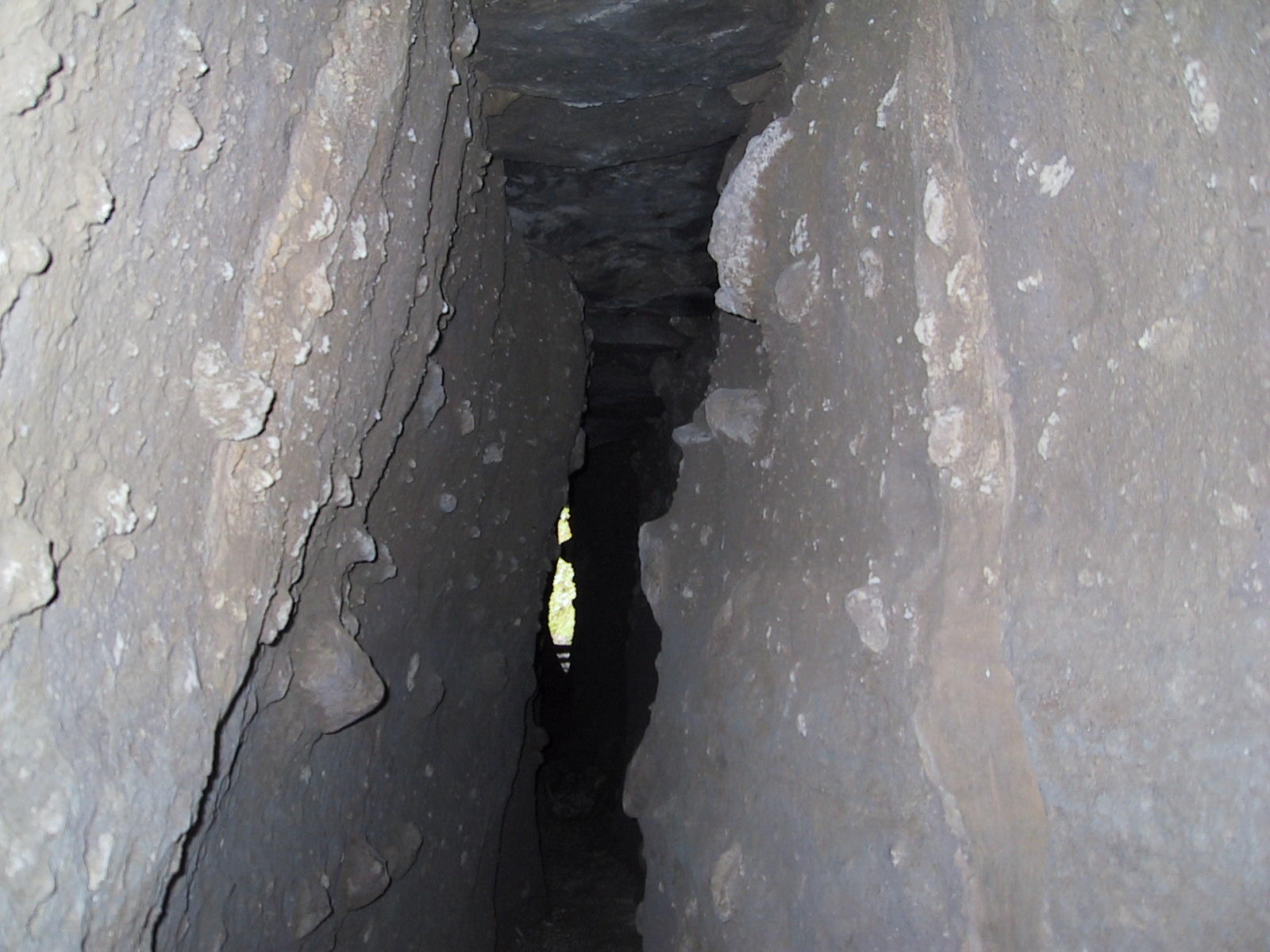
The slit area covered with stones

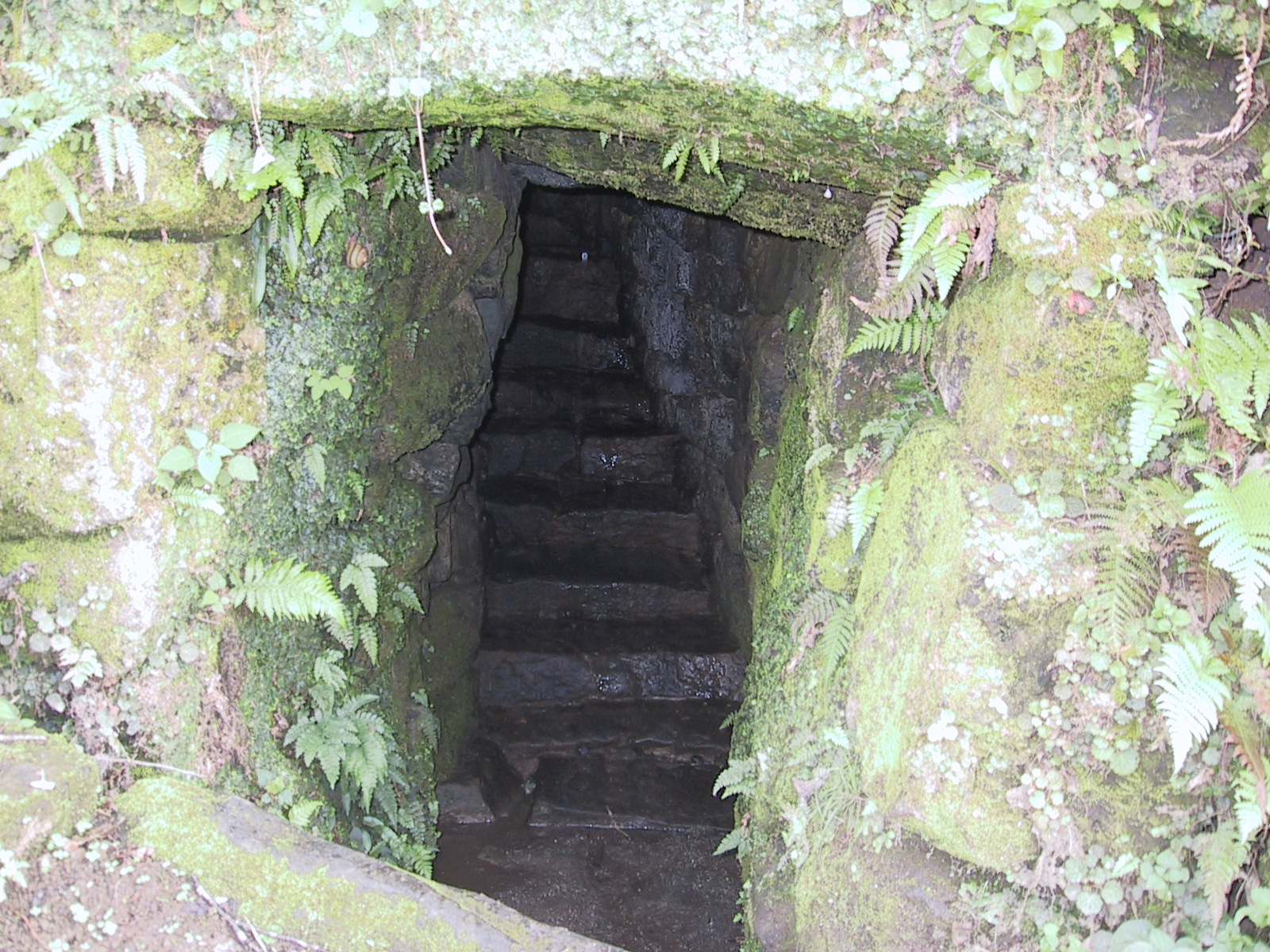
Underground stone masonry underdrain, the steps visible are too shallow to enter in a flexed position

The Tonkararin (トンカラリン, Tonkararin) or Tonkararin tunnel structure is a 464.6 m (1,524 ft) long, tunnel-like structure of unknown origin, situated in Nagomi, Kumamoto Prefecture, Japan. It lies on a plateau called Seibaru Daichi, around which are many kofun or tumuli, such as Eda-Funayama Kofun. It consists of very shallow natural slits of the ground covered with stones and man-made stone-structured underdrains. The name of Tonkararin came from the sound of a stone, when the stone is thrown into the tunnel. Another view is that it came from the Korean language. Korean Tongurami, similar to Tonkararin was a cave connected with religious functions.

== General description ==
Tonkararin came to the attention of Kumamoto people when Sanpaku Koga noticed and reported them to the Kumamoto Prefecture in August 1974. In October, specialists of the cultural assets of Kumamoto Prefecture started to investigate it and an aqueduct hypothesis and a religion-associated hypothesis were suggested. In May 1975, Seichō Matsumoto, a noted novelist interested in archeology and Japanese ancient history, observed Tonkararin and proposed that it might be connected with Yamatai, leading to the nationwide interest in Tonkararin. In 1975, the aqueduct hypothesis was prevalent. In March 1978, the education committee of Kumamoto Prefecture suggested the aqueduct theory in its report. However, in June 1993, a re-investigation of Tonkararin of the team publicly denied the aqueduct theory. There have been no mythological legends in the neighboring area concerning Tonkararin.

== Structure ==
  - The parts of Tonkararin are explained. A slit is a slit of tuff from volcanic ash, considered to be a slit from rain.
- A-B: A lane which is thought to have been a slit (not included in the whole length)
- B-C: 19.3 m. Underground stone masonry underdrain: tunnel made of stones
- C-D: 37.7 m. The first slit with stone ceiling
- D-E: 57.4 m. Lane
- E-F: 31.0 m. The second slit with stone ceiling
- F-G: 54.6 m. Lane
- G-H: 37.1 m. Underground stone masonry underdrain (tunnel) with 7 stone steps
- H-I: 15.7 m. Underground stone masonry underdrain
- I-J: 58.7 m. Lane
- J-K: 64.8 m. Underground stone masonry underdrain
- K-L: 36.1 m. Underground stone masonry underdrain
- L-M: 32.5 m. Underground stone masonry underdrain
  - Total length: 445.1 m.
  - Difference in height: 36.37 m.

== Tonkararin Symposium on October 29, 2001 at Nagomi Town ==
At the symposium, previous views were reviewed. Tatsuo Inoue, Professor Emeritus of Tsukuba University suggested that Tonkararin might be connected with some religious function since rebirth from false death needs entering a cave or purification. Sanpaku Koga, Seiya Tida, Tomoshige Inoue, Tokunao Idemiya and Sachihiro Oota favored the view that Tonkararin was connected with some religious acts.
