= Tamana District, Kumamoto =

District in Kumamoto prefecture, Japan

Coordinates: 33°01′41″N 130°35′24″E

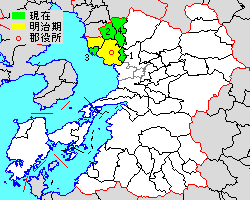
Location of Tamana District in Kumamoto Prefecture. Yellow indicates municipalities belonging to the district during the Meiji era.

Tamana (玉名郡, Tamana-gun) is a district located in Kumamoto Prefecture, Japan.

Following the Tamana merger (but with 2003 population estimates), the district has an estimated population of 47,029 and the density of 222 persons per square kilometer. The total area is 211.54 km^{2}.

== Towns and villages ==
- Gyokutō
- Nagasu
- Nagomi
- Nankan

== Mergers ==
See Merger and dissolution of municipalities of Japan.

- On October 3, 2005, the towns of Taimei, Tensui and Yokoshima merged into the expanded city of Tamana.
- On March 1, 2006, the towns of Kikusui and Mikawa merged to form the new town of Nagomi.
