= Taimei, Kumamoto =

Dissolved municipality in Kumamoto prefecture, Japan

Taimei (岱明町, Taimei-machi) was a town located in Tamana District, Kumamoto Prefecture, Japan.

As of 2003, the town had an estimated population of 14,329 and the density of 628.19 persons per km^{2}. The total area was 22.81 km^{2}.

On October 3, 2005, Taimei, along with the towns of Tensui and Yokoshima (all from Tamana District), was merged into the expanded city of Tamana and no longer exists as an independent municipality.
