= Kikusui, Kumamoto =

Dissolved municipality in Kumamoto prefecture, Japan

Kikusui (菊水町, Kikusui-machi) was a town located in Tamana District, Kumamoto Prefecture, Japan.

As of 2005, the town had an estimated population of 6,523 and a density of 170 persons per km^{2}. The total area was 38.27 km^{2}.

On March 1, 2006, Kikusui, along with the town of Mikawa (also from Tamana District), was merged to create the town of Nagomi and no longer exists as an independent municipality.
