= Nagomi, Kumamoto =

Nagomi 和水町
- Town
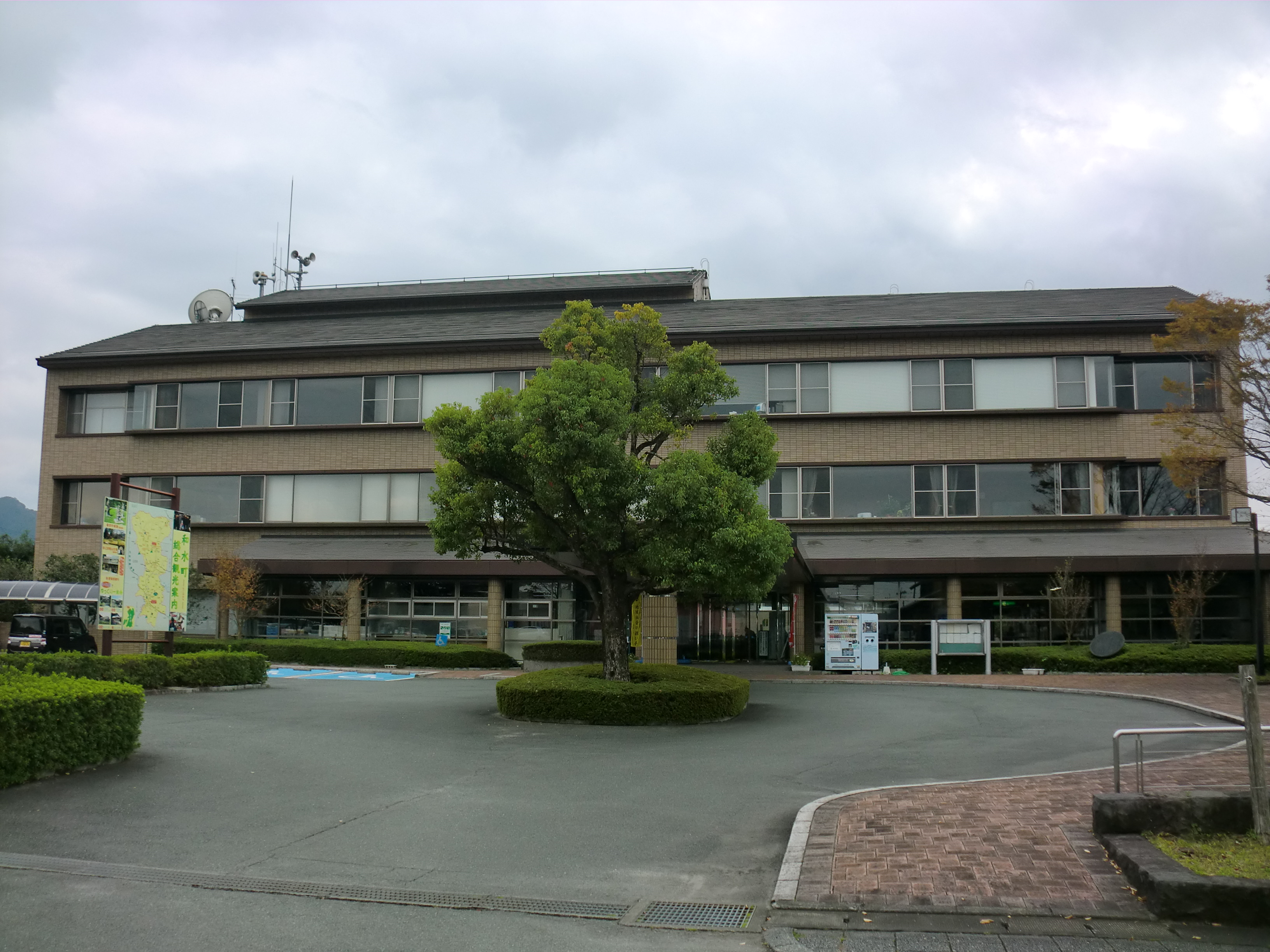
- Nagomi town office

- Flag Seal
- Location of Nagomi in Kumamoto Prefecture

- Location in Japan
- Coordinates: 32°58′41″N 130°36′21″E
- Country: Japan
- Region: Kyushu
- Prefecture: Kumamoto
- District: Tamana

Area
  - Total: 98.78 km^{2} (38.14 sq mi)

Population (July 31, 2024)
  - Total: 9,029
  - Density: 91.41/km^{2} (236.7/sq mi)
- Time zone: UTC+09:00 (JST)
- City hall address: 3886 Eda, Nagomi-cho, Tamana-gun, Kumamoto-ken 865-0136
- Website: Official website

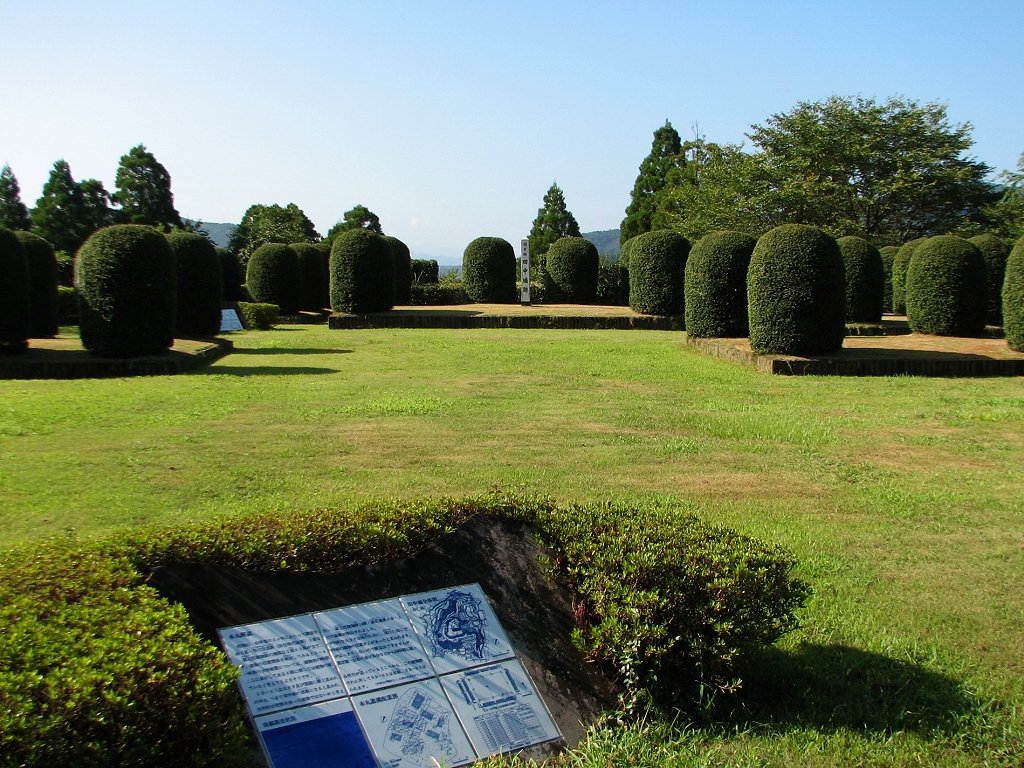
Site of Tanaka Castle

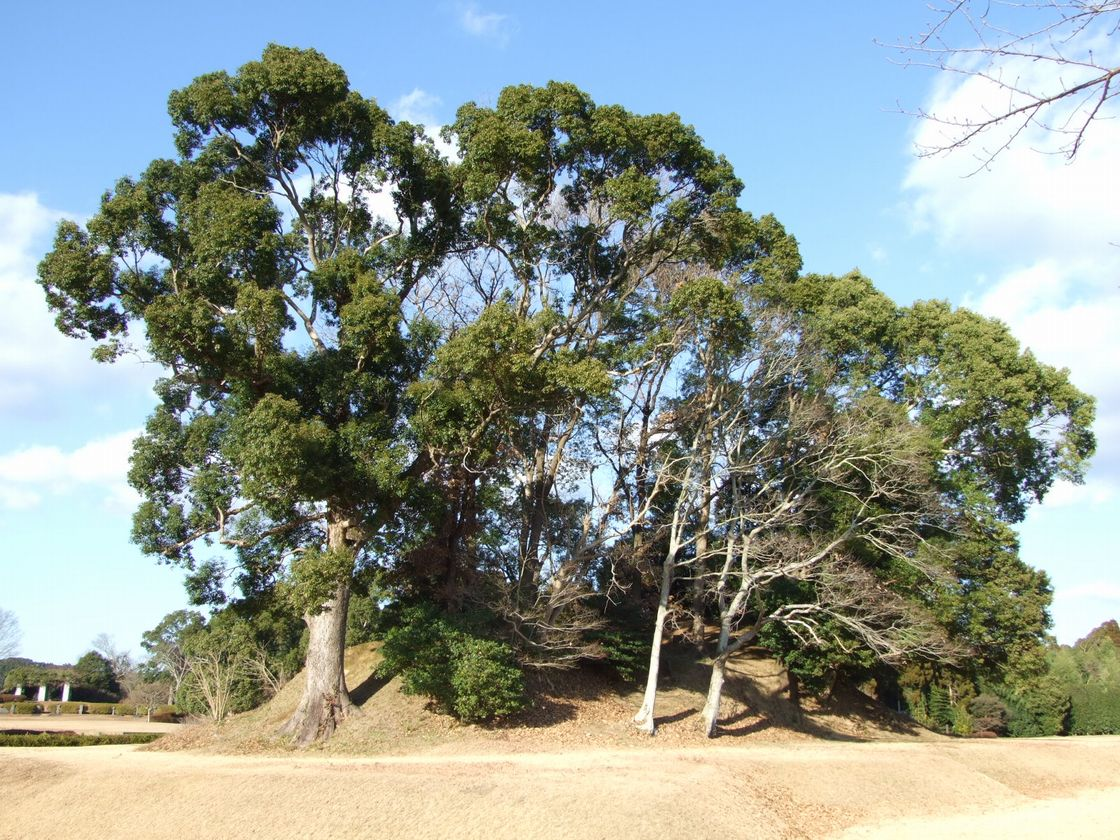
Eta Funayama Kofun

Nagomi (和水町, Nagomi-machi) is a town located in Tamana District, Kumamoto Prefecture, Japan. As of 31 July 2024, the town had an estimated population of 9,029 in 3767 households, and a population density of 91 persons per km^{2}. The total area of the town is 98.78 km^{2} (38.14 sq mi).

== Geography ==
Nagomi is located in the northwest of Kumamoto Prefecture, about 30 kilometers northwest of Kumamoto City, and about 90 kilometers south of Fukuoka City, Fukuoka Prefecture. The town is long and narrow, stretching 19 kilometer from north to south and 9 kilometers from east to west, with the northern part forming the prefectural border with Fukuoka Prefecture. Most of the town area is a basin.

=== Neighboring municipalities ===
Kumamoto Prefecture

- Gyokutō
- Nankan
- Tamana
- Yamaga

Fukuoka Prefecture

- Miyama
- Yame

=== Climate ===
Nagomi has a humid subtropical climate (Köppen Cfa) characterized by warm summers and cool winters with light to no snowfall. The average annual temperature in Nagomi is 16.2 °C. The average annual rainfall is 1932 mm with September as the wettest month. The temperatures are highest on average in August, at around 26.8 °C, and lowest in January, at around 5.9 °C.

=== Demographics ===
Per Japanese census data, the population of Nagomi is as shown below

Historical population
Year	Pop.	±%
1940	17,632	—
1950	21,858	+24.0%
1960	19,615	−10.3%
1970	15,666	−20.1%
1980	13,972	−10.8%
1990	13,484	−3.5%
2000	12,390	−8.1%
2010	11,247	−9.2%
2020	9,342	−16.9%

== History ==
The area of Nagomi was part of ancient Higo Province, During the Edo Period it was part of the holdings of Kumamoto Domain. After the Meiji restoration, the villages of Eta, Hanazuru, Kawazoe, Togo, Kamio, Midori, and Harutomi were established with the creation of the modern municipalities system on April 1, 1889. Eta was raised to town status on July 1, 1943, and merged with Hanazuru, Kawazoe, and Togo to form the town of Kikusui on April 1, 1954. Kamio, Midori, and Harutomi merged on April 1, 1955, to form the village of Mikawa, which was raised to town status on November 1, 1968. Nagomi town was formed on March 1, 2006, from the merger of the towns of Kikusui and Mikawa, both from Tamana District.

== Government ==
Nagomi has a mayor-council form of government with a directly elected mayor and a unicameral city council of 12 members. Nagomi, collectively with the other municipalities of Tamana District, contributes one member to the Kumamoto Prefectural Assembly. In terms of national politics, the town is part of the Kumamoto 2nd district of the lower house of the Diet of Japan.

== Economy ==
The local economy is based on agriculture and food processing.

== Education ==
Nagomi has two public elementary schools and two public junior high schools operated by the town government. The town does not have a high school.

== Transportation ==
=== Railways ===
Nagomi has no passenger railway services. The nearest train stations are Omuta Station on the JR Kyushu Kagoshima Main Line and Nishitetsu Tenjin Ōmuta Line, or Tamana Station on the JR Kagoshima Main Line.

=== Highways ===
- Kyushu Expressway
- National Route 443

== Local attractions ==
- Eta Anakannon Kofun, National Historic Site
- Eta Funayama Kofun, National Historic Site
- Tanaka Castle ruins, National Historic Site
- Tonkararin Tunnel Structure

== Notable people from Nagomi ==
- Shizo Kanakuri, Olympic marathon runner
