= Tamana, Kumamoto =

Tamana 玉名市
- City
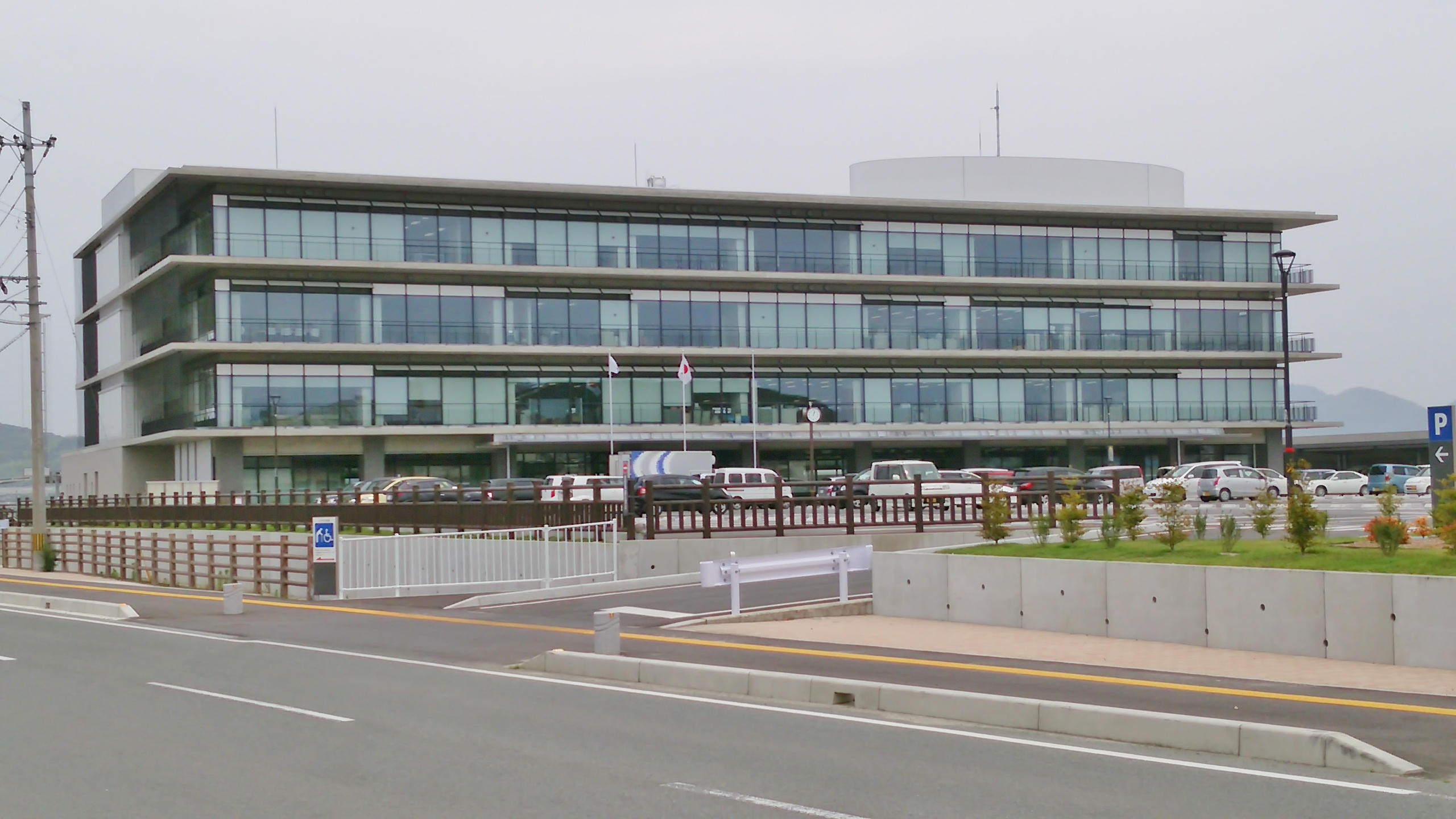
- Tamana City Hall

- Flag Seal
- Location of Tamana in Kumamoto Prefecture

- Location in Japan
- Coordinates: 32°56′08″N 130°33′46″E
- Country: Japan
- Region: Kyushu
- Prefecture: Kumamoto

Government
  - Mayor: Tetsuya Takasaki

Area
  - Total: 152.60 km^{2} (58.92 sq mi)

Population (July 31, 2024)
  - Total: 62,784
  - Density: 462/km^{2} (1,200/sq mi)
- Time zone: UTC+09:00 (JST)
- City hall address: 163, Iwasaki, Tamana-shi, Kumamoto-ken 865-8501
- Climate: Cfa
- Website: Official website
- Symbols
- Bird: Egret
- Flower: Higo Hanashōbu (Iris ensata var. ensata)
- Tree: Shōtaimatsu Pine

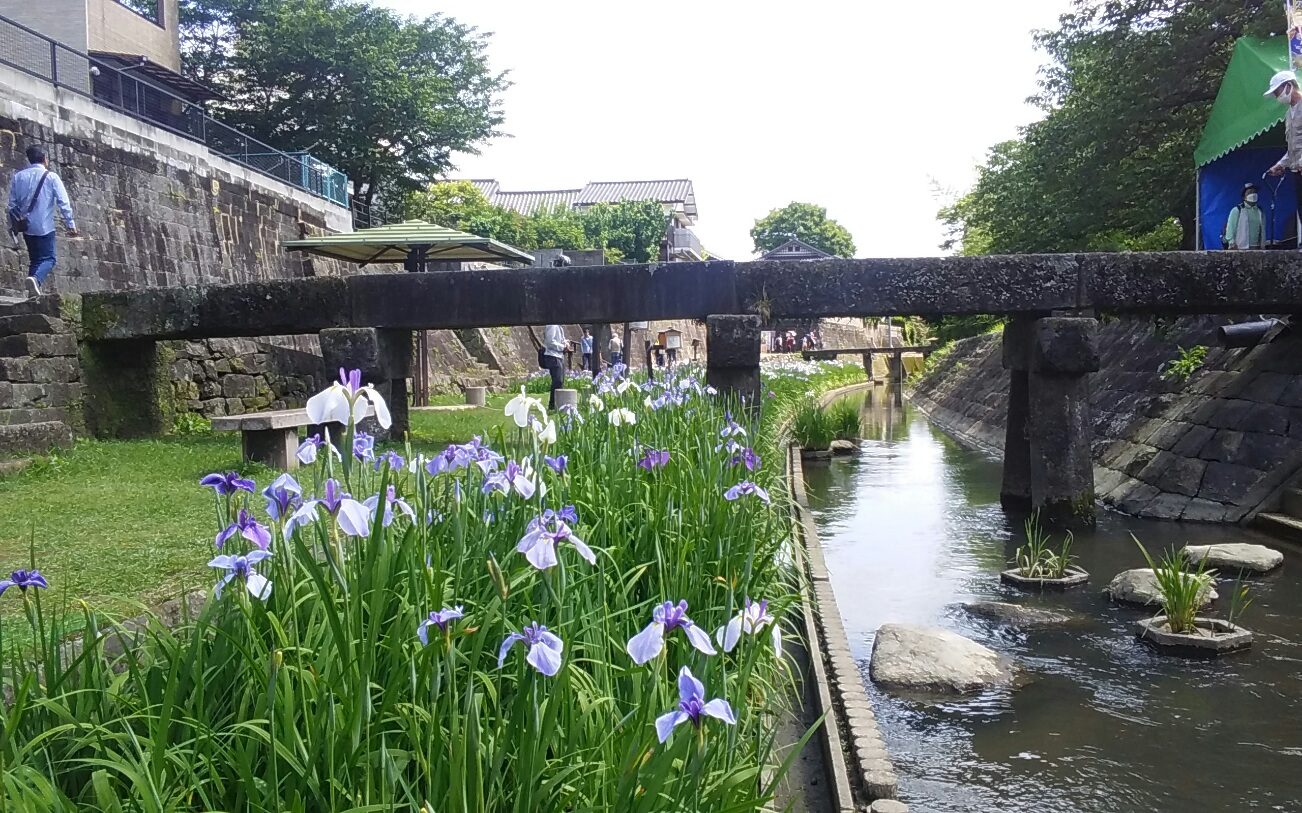
Takase Uragawa

Tamana (玉名市, Tamana-shi) is a city located in Kumamoto Prefecture, Japan. As of 31 July 2024, the city had an estimated population of 62,784 in 28553 households, and a population density of 462 persons per km^{2}. The total area of the city is 152.60 km^{2} (58.92 sq mi).

== Geography ==
Tamana is located in an inland area in the northwest of Kumamoto Prefecture.

=== Neighboring municipalities ===
Kumamoto Prefecture

- Arao
- Gyokutō
- Kumamoto
- Nagasu
- Nagomi
- Nankan

=== Climate ===
Tamana has a humid subtropical climate (Köppen climate classification Cfa) with hot, humid summers and cool winters. There is significant precipitation throughout the year, especially during June and July. The average annual temperature in Tamana is 16.8 °C (62.2 °F). The average annual rainfall is 1,802.6 mm (70.97 in) with June as the wettest month. The temperatures are highest on average in August, at around 28.3 °C (82.9 °F), and lowest in January, at around 5.6 °C (42.1 °F). The highest temperature ever recorded in Tamana was 39.6 °C (103.3 °F) on 3 August 2026; the coldest temperature ever recorded was −7.7 °C (18.1 °F) on 19 February 1977.

Climate data for Taimei, Tamana (1991−2020 normals, extremes 1977−present)
Month	Jan	Feb	Mar	Apr	May	Jun	Jul	Aug	Sep	Oct	Nov	Dec	Year
Record high °C (°F)	20.0 (68.0)	22.6 (72.7)	26.7 (80.1)	30.7 (87.3)	34.2 (93.6)	36.8 (98.2)	38.3 (100.9)	39.6 (103.3)	37.6 (99.7)	33.4 (92.1)	28.5 (83.3)	23.9 (75.0)	39.6 (103.3)
Mean daily maximum °C (°F)	10.7 (51.3)	12.2 (54.0)	15.7 (60.3)	20.9 (69.6)	25.6 (78.1)	27.9 (82.2)	31.6 (88.9)	33.2 (91.8)	30.1 (86.2)	25.0 (77.0)	18.7 (65.7)	13.0 (55.4)	22.1 (71.7)
Daily mean °C (°F)	5.6 (42.1)	6.8 (44.2)	10.2 (50.4)	15.2 (59.4)	19.9 (67.8)	23.4 (74.1)	27.3 (81.1)	28.3 (82.9)	24.8 (76.6)	19.1 (66.4)	13.1 (55.6)	7.7 (45.9)	16.8 (62.2)
Mean daily minimum °C (°F)	1.0 (33.8)	1.7 (35.1)	4.9 (40.8)	9.6 (49.3)	14.7 (58.5)	19.7 (67.5)	23.9 (75.0)	24.5 (76.1)	20.5 (68.9)	14.0 (57.2)	8.1 (46.6)	2.9 (37.2)	12.1 (53.8)
Record low °C (°F)	−7.4 (18.7)	−7.7 (18.1)	−3.9 (25.0)	−1.6 (29.1)	4.1 (39.4)	9.6 (49.3)	15.5 (59.9)	16.9 (62.4)	7.1 (44.8)	2.1 (35.8)	−1.7 (28.9)	−4.7 (23.5)	−7.7 (18.1)
Average precipitation mm (inches)	53.2 (2.09)	71.3 (2.81)	112.0 (4.41)	132.6 (5.22)	151.5 (5.96)	357.5 (14.07)	329.2 (12.96)	180.7 (7.11)	166.8 (6.57)	83.8 (3.30)	83.9 (3.30)	59.8 (2.35)	1,802.6 (70.97)
Average precipitation days (≥ 1.0 mm)	6.7	8.3	9.9	9.5	8.8	13.5	11.3	9.7	8.7	6.5	7.4	7.0	107.3
Mean monthly sunshine hours	133.4	143.9	167.3	183.2	191.6	124.4	187.7	220.6	178.7	180.4	148.6	137.8	1,997.6
Source: Japan Meteorological Agency

=== Demographics ===
Per Japanese census data, the population of Tamana in 2020 is 64,292 people. Tamana has been conducting censuses since 1960.

Historical population
Year	Pop.	±%
1960	78,100	—
1965	73,818	−5.5%
1970	69,354	−6.0%
1975	69,893	+0.8%
1980	72,324	+3.5%
1985	74,356	+2.8%
1990	73,319	−1.4%
1995	72,900	−0.6%
2000	73,051	+0.2%
2005	71,851	−1.6%
2010	69,549	−3.2%
2015	66,782	−4.0%
2020	64,292	−3.7%
Tamana population statistics

== History ==
The area of Tamana was part of ancient Higo Province, During the Edo Period it was part of the holdings of Kumamoto Domain. After the Meiji restoration, the village of Tamana was established with the creation of the modern municipalities system on April 1, 1889. It was raised to town status on May 20, 1942. The city was founded on April 1, 1954 by the merger of Tamana with the villages of Nameshi, Toyosui, Ishinuki, Tamana, Oda, Umebayashi, Ikura, Tsukiyama, Ohama, Yaga, and Tsukise.

On October 3, 2005, the towns of Taimei, Tensui and Yokoshima (all from Tamana District) were merged into Tamana.

== Government ==
Tamana has a mayor-council form of government with a directly elected mayor and a unicameral city council of 22 members. Tamana contributes one member to the Kumamoto Prefectural Assembly. In terms of national politics, the city is part of the Kumamoto 2nd district of the lower house of the Diet of Japan.

== Economy ==
Tamana is a regional commercial center with a mixed economy of agriculture and light manufacturing.

== Education ==
Tamana has 15 public elementary schools and six public junior high schools operated by the city government and one public junior high school and three public high schools operated by the Kumamoto Prefectural Board of Education. There are also two private high schools. The Kyushu University of Nursing and Social Welfare is located in Tamana

== Transportation ==
=== Railways ===
JR Kyushu - Kagoshima Main Line

JB Ōnoshimo - Tamana - Higo-Ikura

JR Kyushu - Kyushu Shinkansen

Shin-Tamana

=== Highways ===
- National Route 208
- National Route 501

== Sister cities ==
- Clarinda, Iowa, United States, sister city since 1996
- Wafangdian, Liaoning China, friendship city since 1996

== Local attractions ==
=== National Historic Sites ===
- Daibō Kofun
- Eianji Higashi Kofun - Eianji Nishi Kofun
- Ishinuki Anakannon Cave Tombs
- Ishinukinagi Cave Tomb Cluster

== Notable people from Tamana ==
- Makoto Izubuchi (born 1974), Japanese comedian, professional wrestler and tarento ("talent")
- Shizo Kanakuri (1891–1983), Japanese marathon runner and one of the early leaders of track and field athletics in Japan
- Kenichi Matsuoka (born 1982), professional Japanese baseball player (Tokyo Yakult Swallows, pitcher)
- Hayato Mizowaki (born 1994), Japanese professional baseball infielder for the Chunichi Dragons in Japan's Nippon Professional Baseball.
- Yoshihiro Tajiri (born 1970), Japanese professional wrestler and promoter
- Tenkaihō Takayuki (born 1984), retired sumo wrestler
- Katsuhiro Ueo (born 1972), Japanese professional drifting driver
