= Yokoshima, Kumamoto =

Dissolved municipality in Kumamoto prefecture, Japan

Yokoshima (横島町, Yokoshima-machi) was a town located in Tamana District, Kumamoto Prefecture, Japan.

As of 2003, the town had an estimated population of 5,687 and the density of 335.52 persons per km^{2}. The total area was 16.95 km^{2}.

On October 3, 2005, Yokoshima, along with the towns of Taimei and Tensui (all from Tamana District), was merged into the expanded city of Tamana and no longer exists as an independent municipality.
