= Kyushu University of Nursing and Social Welfare =

Coordinates: 32°56′47″N 130°33′12″E

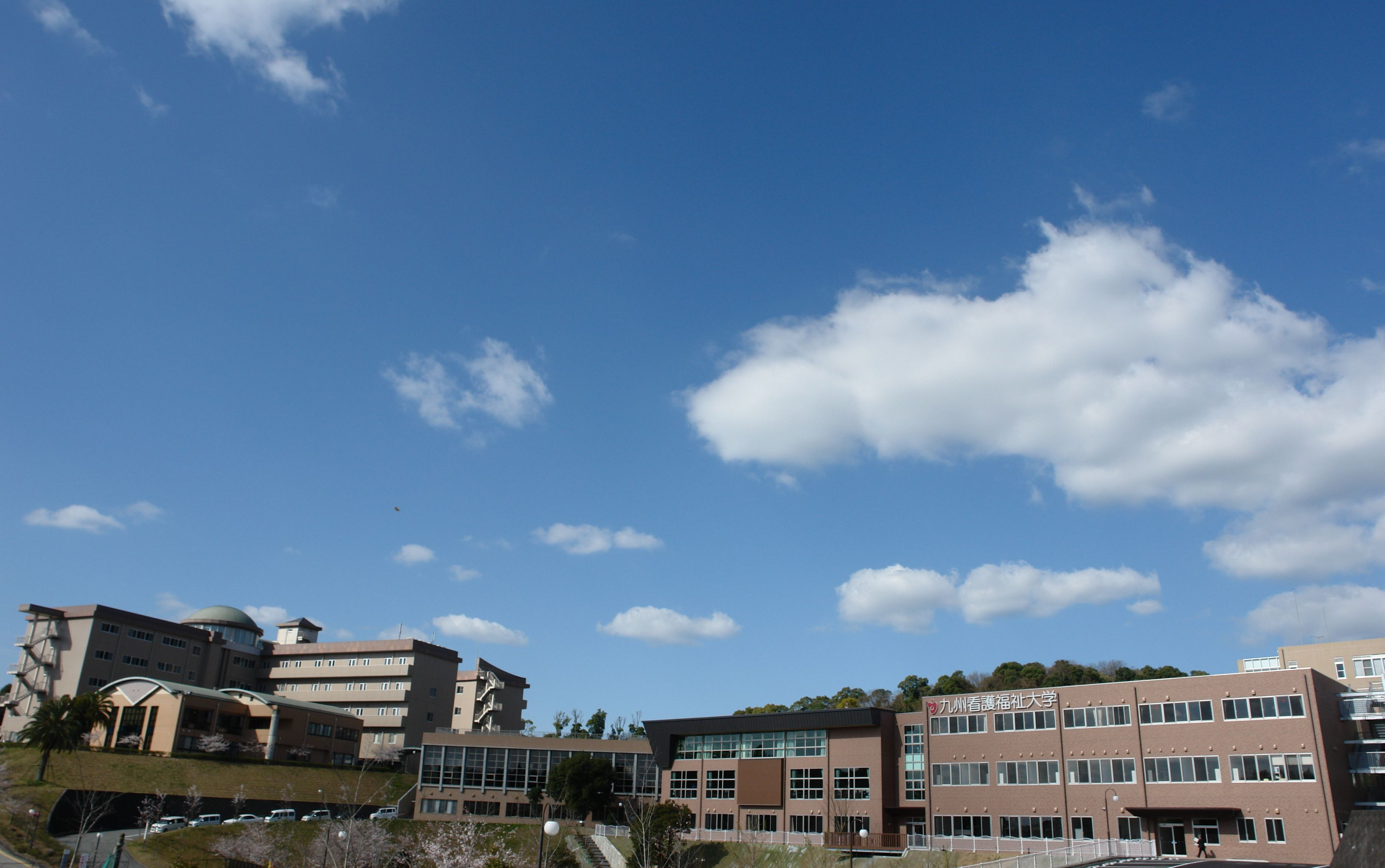
Kyushu University of Nursing and Social Welfare

Kyushu University of Nursing and Social Welfare (九州看護福祉大学, Kyūshū kango fukushi daigaku) is a private university in Tamana, Kumamoto, Japan, established in 1998.
