= Ishinuki Anakannon Cave Tombs =

Archaeological site in Japan

Ishinuki Anakannon Cave Tomb
- 石貫穴観音横穴 (Japanese)
- Ishinuki Anakannon Cave Tomb Ishinuki Anakannon Cave Tombs (Japan)
- Interactive map of Ishinuki Anakannon Cave Tomb
- 32°58′09″N 130°33′47″E
- Type: corridor-type kofun (横穴式石室, yokoana-shiki sekishitsu)
- Location: Tamana, Kumamoto, Japan
- Region: Kyushu

Site notes
- Public access: Yes

The Ishinuki Anakannon Cave Tombs (石貫穴観音横穴, Ishinuki Anakannon yokoana) is an archaeological site containing five Kofun period yokoanabo (横穴墓), tunnel tombs in artificial caves, located in the Ishinuki neighborhood of the city of Tamana, Kumamoto, Japan. It was granted protection as a National Historic Site in 1921.

== Overview ==
The Ishinuki Anakannon Cave Tomb is located about 5 kilometers north from the urban center of Tamana, just past Toratori Bridge over the Hanegi River. The cluster consists of five large corridor-type kofun on the west side of the same hill as the Ishinuki Cave Tomb Cluster, which has a separate National Historic Site designation. Tombs 1 to 3 are lined up in a row, and Tombs 4 and 5 are slightly further apart and lower. The first three tombs are decorated kofun, and have triple-layered decorative borders at the entrance, with the outer two arched, and a faint red circle pattern. The central tomb has a carving of the Senjū Kannon (Sahasrabhuja) in the inner chamber, and an Jūichimen Kannon to the right, so it is called the "Ana Kannon" (hole Kannon). This tomb consists of an antechamber and an inner chamber, the antechamber is almost square, 2.5 by 2.9 meters. The entrance to the inner chamber is covered with real tiles. The Thousand-Armed Kannon faith was introduced in the Nara period, and the cave may have to have been built in the first half of the 8th century, rather than having been a re-purposed Kofun period tomb.

== See also ==
- List of Historic Sites of Japan (Kumamoto)
