= Shin-Tamana Station =

Railway station in Tamana, Kumamoto prefecture, Japan

Coordinates: 32°56′35″N 130°34′23″E

Shin-Tamana Station 新玉名駅
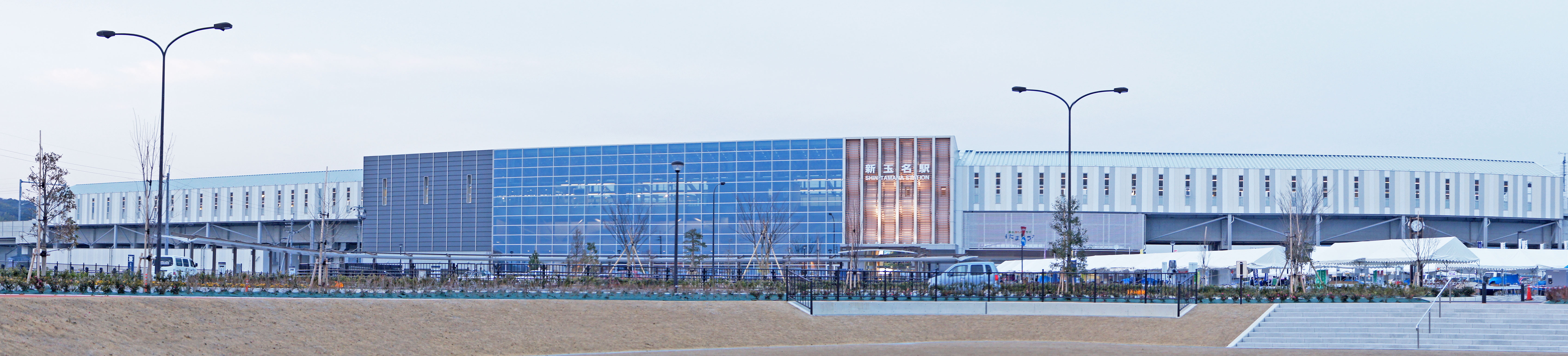
- Shin-Tamana Station in March 2011

General information
- Location: 1229-3 Tamana, Taman City; Kumamoto Prefecture, Kyushu; Japan
- Operator: JR Kyushu
- Line: Kyūshū Shinkansen
- Platforms: 2 side platforms
- Tracks: 2

Construction
- Structure type: Elevated

History
- Opened: 12 March 2011; 15 years ago

Services
Preceding station	JR Kyushu	Following station
Kumamoto towards Kagoshima-Chūō	Kyūshū Shinkansen Sakura Tsubame	Shin-Ōmuta towards Hakata
Location
- Location within Kumamoto Prefecture Location within Kyushu Location within Japan

Shin-Tamana Station (新玉名駅, Shin-Tamana-eki) is a railway station on the Kyushu Shinkansen in Tamana, Kumamoto, Japan, operated by the Kyushu Railway Company (JR Kyushu). The station opened on March 12, 2011.

== Lines ==
Shin-Tamana Station is served by the Kyushu Shinkansen high-speed railway line which operates between Hakata in Fukuoka Prefecture and Kagoshima-Chūō in Kagoshima Prefecture. Shin-Tamana Station is served by Tsubame stopping services, but a small number of limited-stop direct Sakura services to and from Shin-Osaka also stop here.

== Layout ==
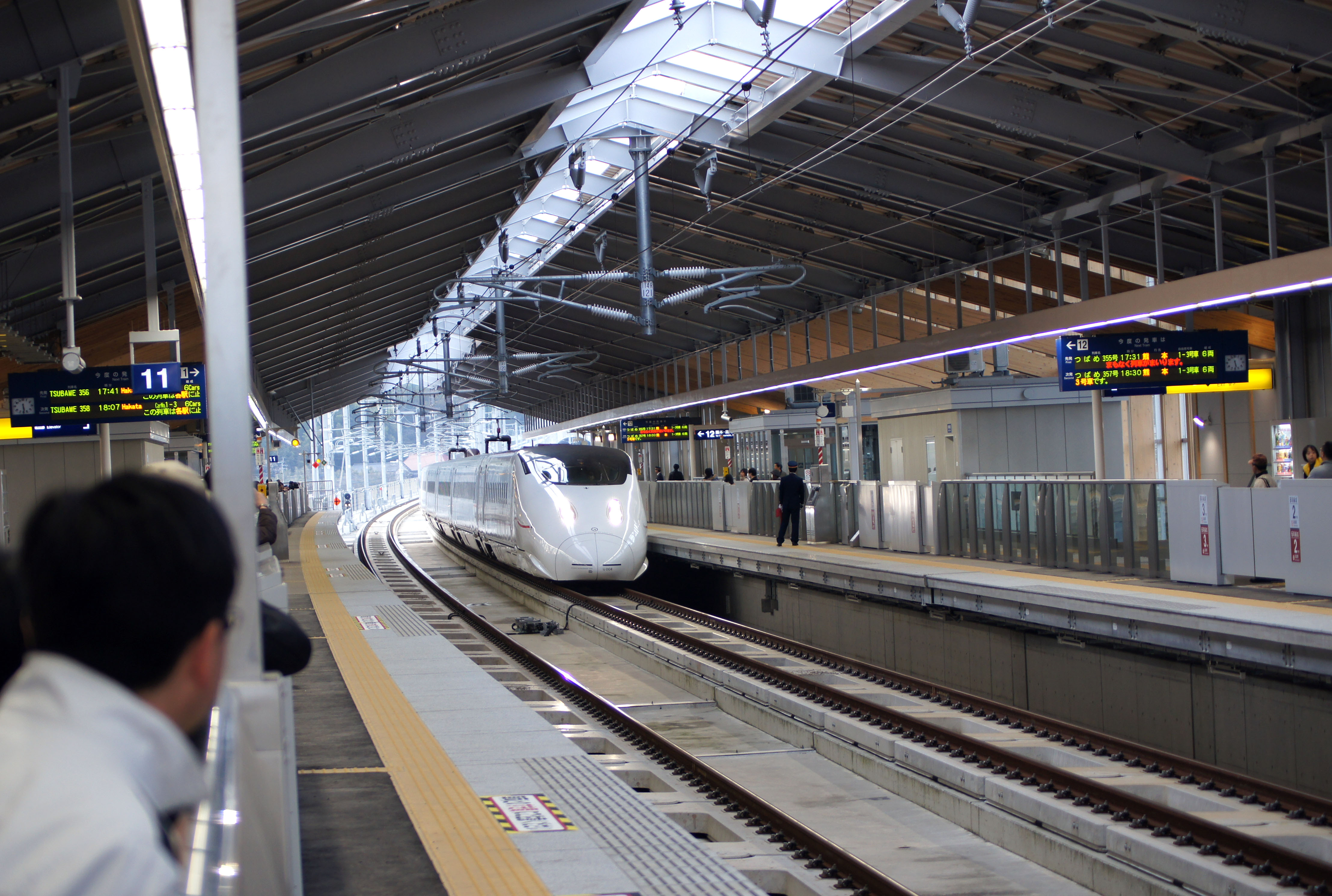
The platforms in March 2011

The station has two opposed side platforms, serving two tracks.

=== Platforms ===
11	Kyushu Shinkansen	for Hakata and Shin-Ōsaka
12	Kyushu Shinkansen	for Kumamoto and Kagoshima-Chūō

From October 2015, JR Kyushu plans to remove platform operating staff from the station as a cost-cutting exercise. This will become the first shinkansen station to operate without staff present on the platforms. This is possible due to the relatively straight platforms and the low passenger usage figures of around 1,000 passengers daily.

== History ==
The station opened on 12 March 2011, coinciding with the opening of the first section of the Kyushu Shinkansen between Hakata and Shin-Yatsushiro.

== Surrounding area ==
- Kyushu University of Nursing and Social Welfare
- National Route 208

== See also ==
- List of railway stations in Japan
