= Kinpōzan Prefectural Natural Park =

Natural park in Kumamoto Prefecture, Japan

- 金峰山県立自然公園
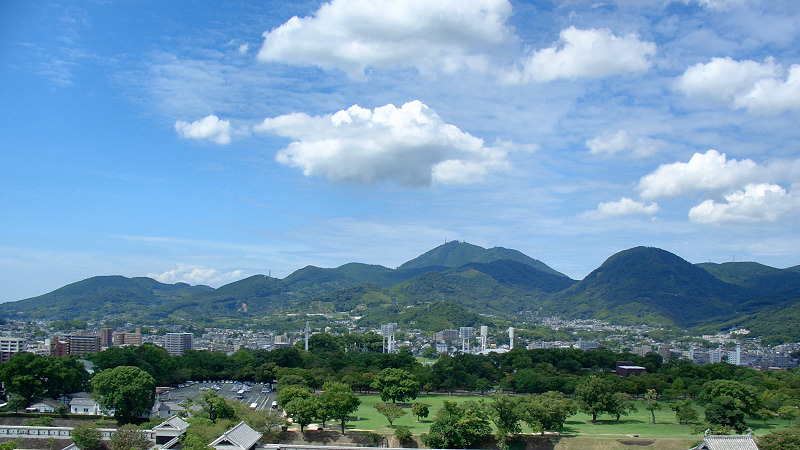
- Mount Kinbō viewed from Kumamoto Castle

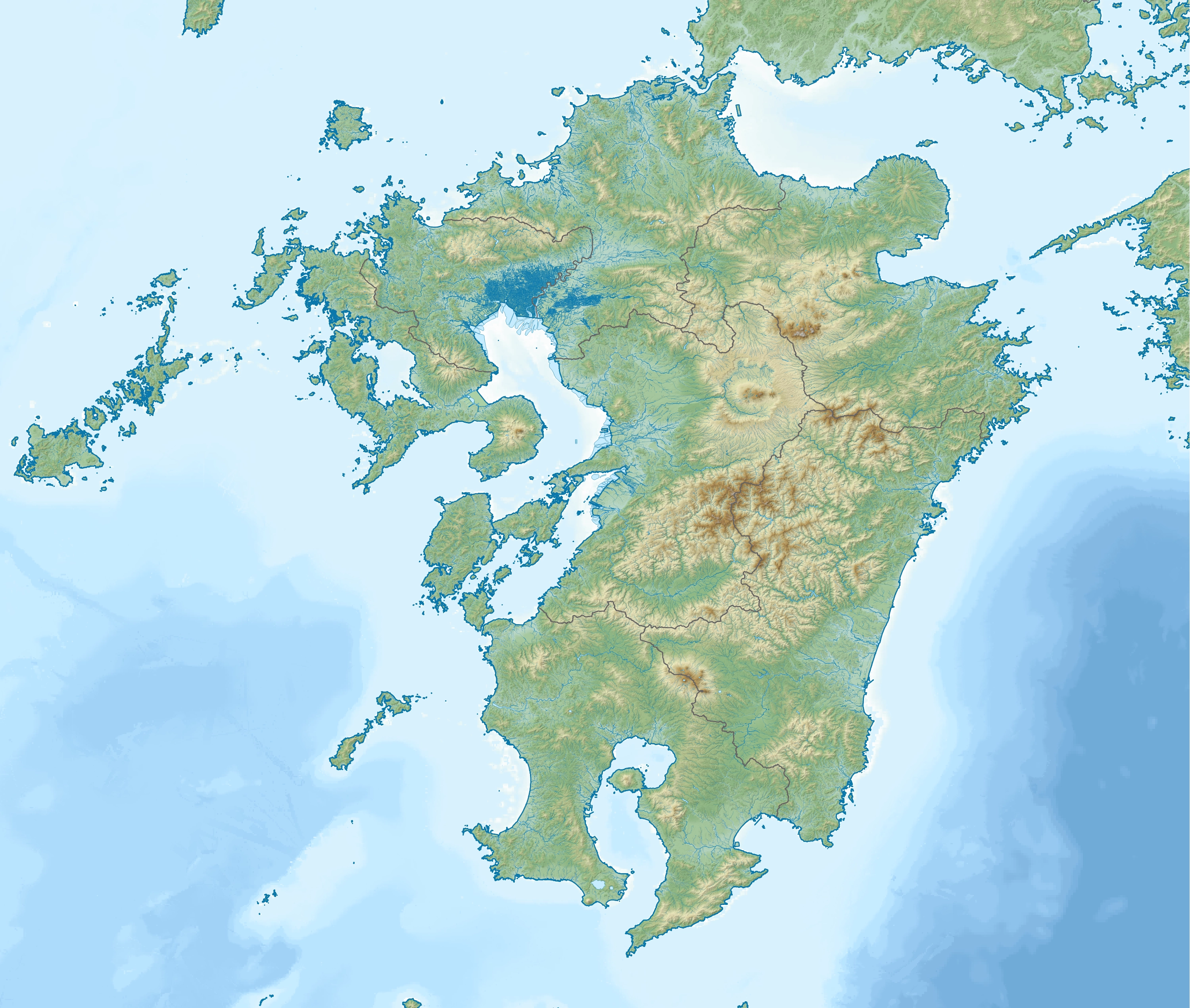
- Location within Kumamoto Prefecture Location within Kyushu Location within Japan
- Location: Kumamoto Prefecture, Japan
- Coordinates: 32.84°N 130.67°E
- Area: 73.19 km^{2} (28.26 sq mi)
- Established: 1 April 1955

Kinpōzan Prefectural Natural Park (金峰山県立自然公園, Kinpōzan kenritsu shizen kōen) is a Prefectural Natural Park in northwest Kumamoto Prefecture, Japan. Established in 1955, the park spans the municipalities of Gyokutō, Kumamoto, and Tamana. The park derives its name from Mount Kinbō and encompasses Honmyōji, Ohagi gardens, and Mount Sanno.

== See also ==
- National Parks of Japan
