= Kumamoto earthquake =

Kumamoto earthquake may refer to:

- 1889 Kumamoto earthquake
- 2016 Kumamoto earthquakes
- 2026 Kumamoto earthquake

== See also ==
- List of earthquakes in Japan
