= Sakuranobaba Josaien =

Coordinates: 32°48′33.8″N 130°41′58.5″E

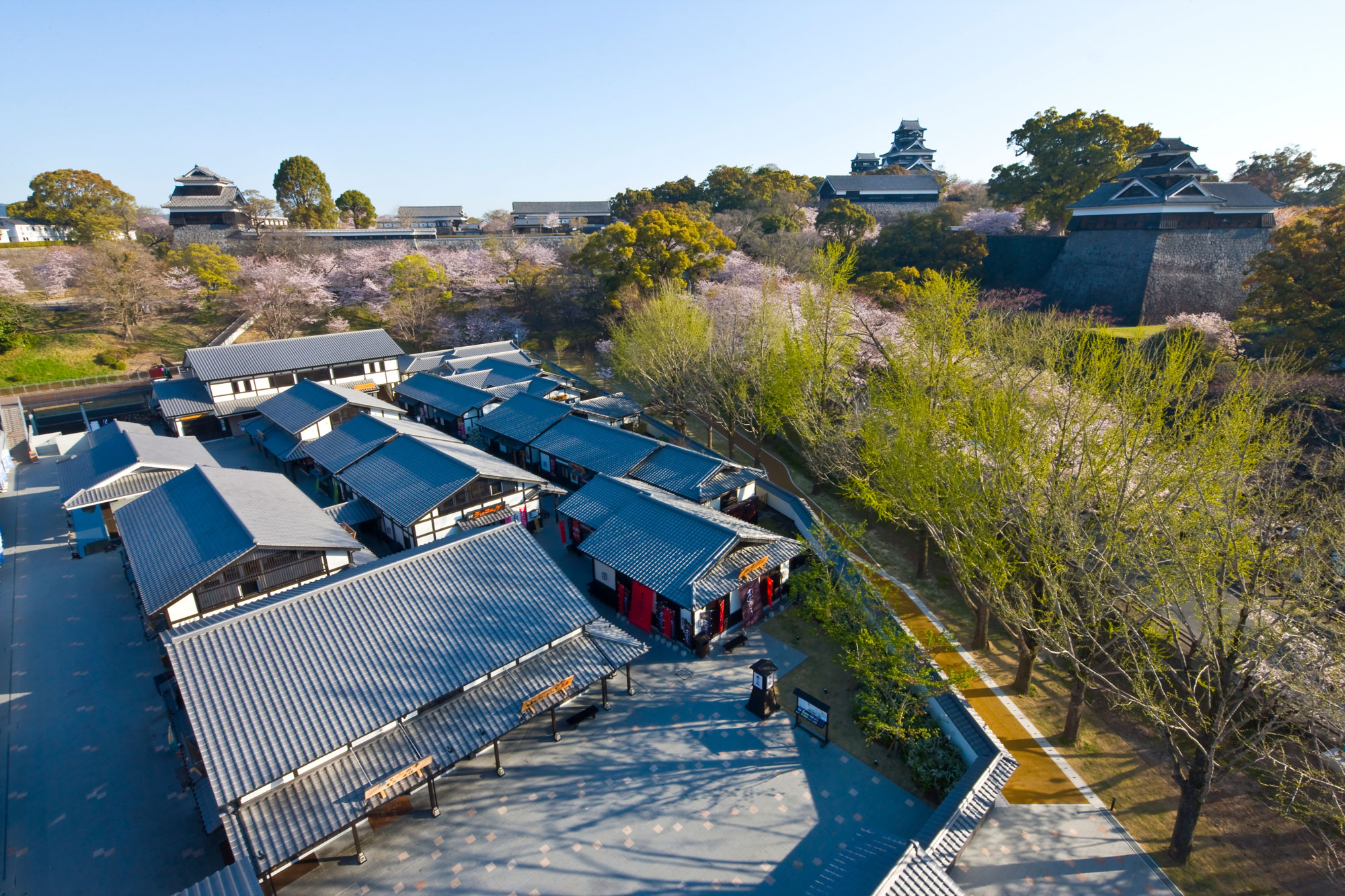
Sakuranobaba Josaien and Kumamoto Castle

Sakuranobaba Josaien (桜の馬場 城彩苑, Sakuranobaba Jōsaien) is a Japanese tourism facility located next to Kumamoto Castle in Kumamoto City, Kumamoto Prefecture. The facility is composed of three areas: Josaien Kumamoto Castle Shops (a collection of 23 shops and restaurants offering food and products from Kumamoto), Kumamoto Castle Museum Wakuwakuza (a facility with exhibits on the history and culture of Kumamoto), and a tourism information office.

== General information ==
- Admission: Free, except for Wakuwakuza
- Hours
  - Kumamoto Castle Museum Wakuwakuza/Tourism Information Office
    - March–November: 8:30-18:30, December–February: 8:00-17:30 (Last entrance to Wakuwakuza is 30 minutes before closing)
    - Open until 19:30 when Kumamoto Castle is open at night.
  - Josaien Kumamoto Castle Shops
    - Shops March–November: 9:00-19:00, December–February: 9:00-18:00
    - Dining 11:00-22:00 (last order and closing times differ for each restaurant)
- Closed: 12/30-31
- Parking
  - Regular vehicles (passenger vehicles, motorcycles): Pay parking available
  - Buses: Free parking (up to 3 hours, reservations made at least one day prior to visit required)

== Location ==
1-1 Ninomaru, Chuo-ku, Kumamoto, Japan 860-0008

== See also ==
- Kumamoto Castle
