= Mount Kinbō (Kumamoto) =

Mountain on the island of Kyushu, Japan

- 金峰山
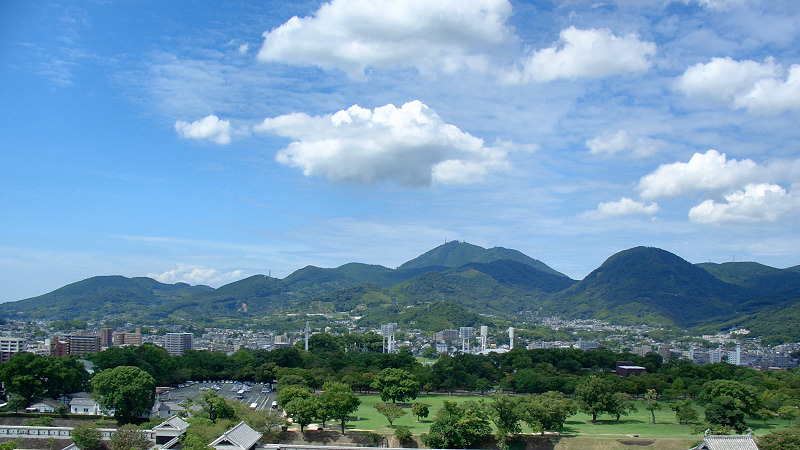
- Viewed from the E.

Highest point
- Elevation: 665.2 m (2,182 ft)
- Coordinates: 32°48′50″N 130°38′20″E

Geography
- Location within Japan
- Location: Nishi-ku, Kumamoto, Kumamoto Prefecture, Japan

Geology
- Mountain type(s): Stratovolcano, Lava dome
- Last eruption: 0.2 Ma BP

Climbing
- Easiest route: Hike

Mount Kinbō (金峰山, Kinbō-san) or Mount Kinpō (金峰山, Kinpō-san) is a stratovolcano in the west of Kumamoto city, Kumamoto Prefecture, Japan. It is an extinct stratovolcano and lava dome. Mount Kinbō overlooks the city of Kumamoto and is used for sightseeing and for radio and TV broadcast antennas.

== Geology ==
Older than nearby Mount Aso, it formed over the past 100 million years. Extensive volcanic activity took place 56 million years to 50 million years ago. The last eruption took place from 200,000 years to 150,000 years ago. In 1889 a 6.3 magnitude earthquake struck beneath the mountain. In 2016 the foreshock of the 2016 Kumamoto earthquakes also struck beneath Mount Kinbō.

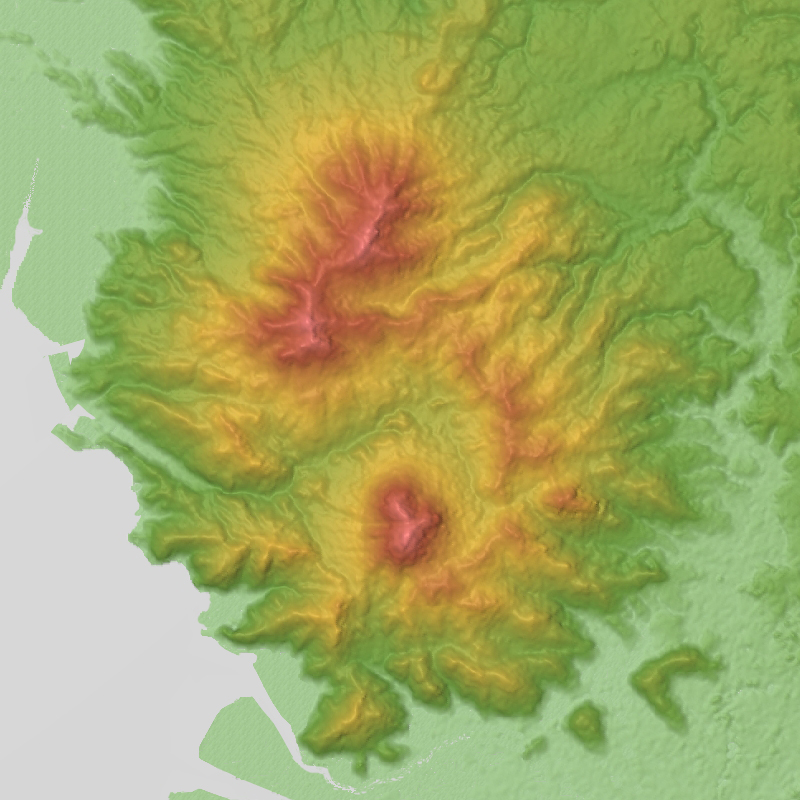
Massif of Kinbo Volcano

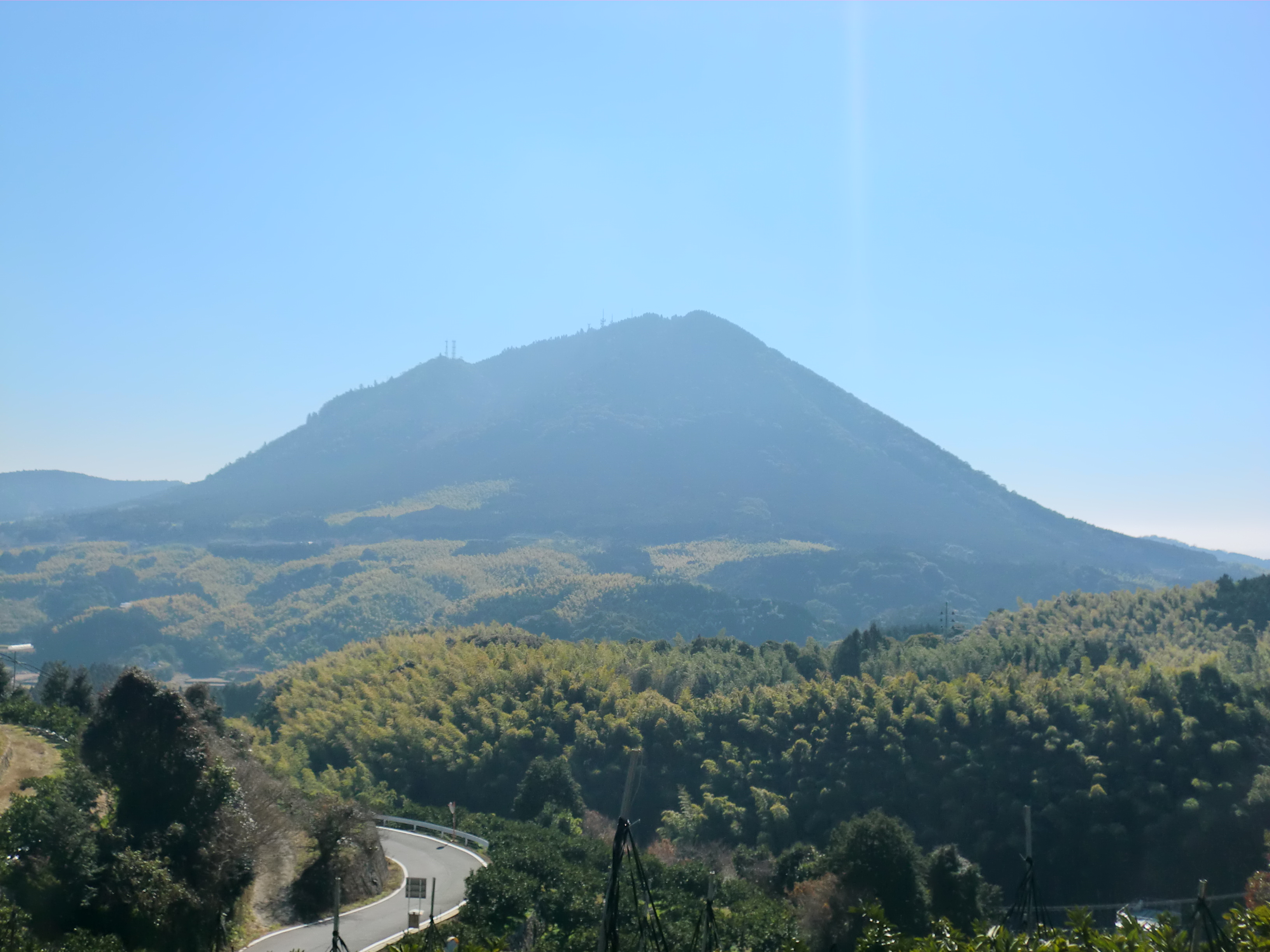
Mount Kinbo in the narrow sense

== History ==
Master swordsman Miyamoto Musashi wrote parts of his Book of Five Rings while staying on the mountain. Most of the mountain now lies within Kinpōzan Prefectural Natural Park.

== See also ==
- List of volcanoes in Japan
