= Kumamoto Castle =

Castle in Kumamoto, Japan

Coordinates: 32°48′22″N 130°42′21″E

- 熊本城
- Chūō-ku, Kumamoto, Kumamoto Prefecture, Japan
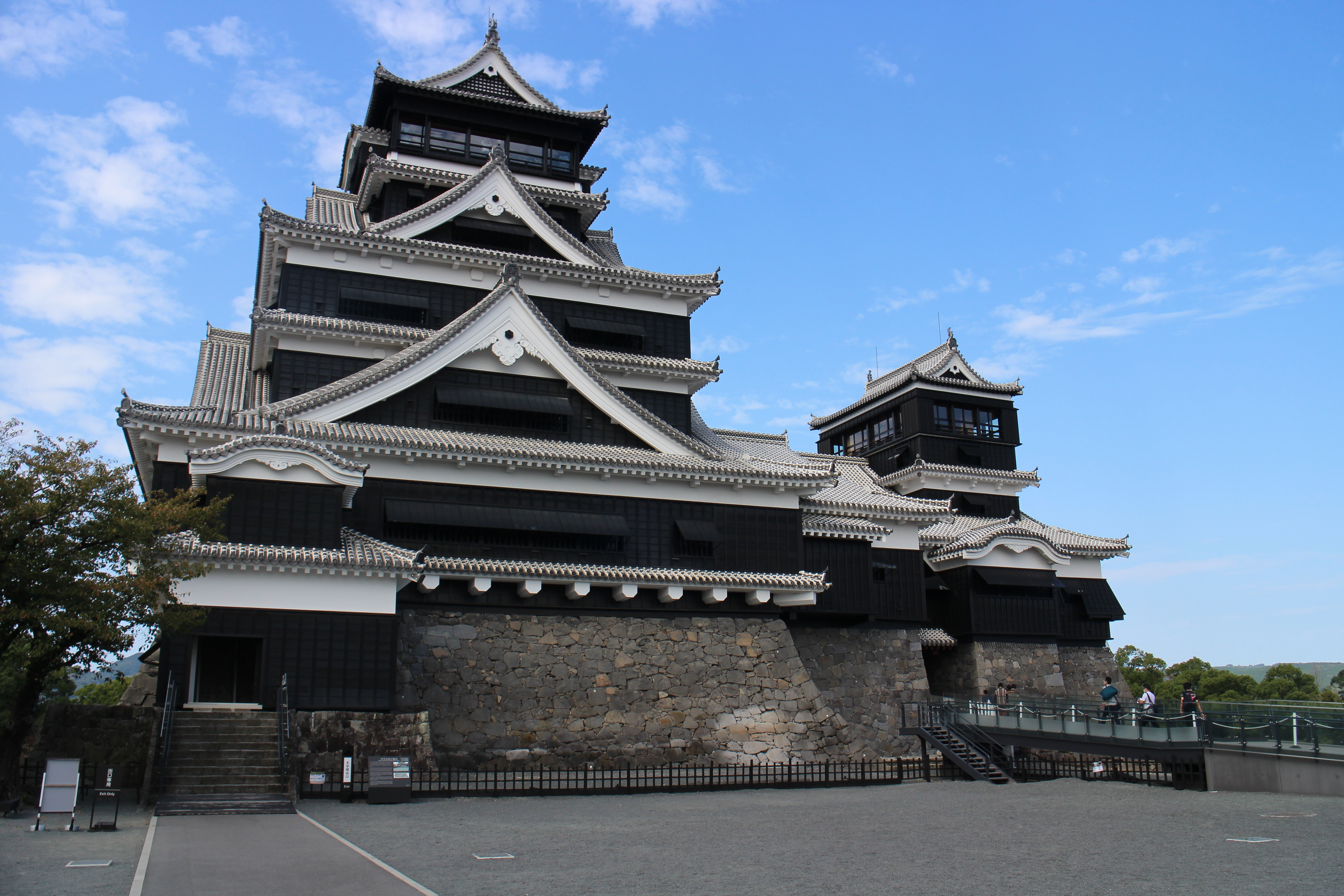

Site information
- Type: Azuchi-Momoyama castle
- Controlled by: Ideta clan (1469–1496); Kanokogi clan (1496–1550); Jou clan (1550–1587); Sassa clan (1587–1588); Kato clan (1588–1632); Hosokawa clan (1632–1871); Japan (1871–present)
- Condition: Restored in 1960 and 1998–2008. Currently under repair following damage caused by the 2016 Kumamoto earthquakes, damaged again by the 2026 Kumamoto earthquake.

Site history
- Built: 1467 (original fortifications); 1496 (expansion); 1601–1607 (expansion); 1610 (Honmaru Goten Palace); 1960 (reconstruction); 1998–2008 (reconstruction); 2016-present (repairs following Earthquake damage)
- Built by: Ideta Hidenobu (1467); Kanokogi Chikakazu (1496); Katō Kiyomasa (1601–1607); Katō Kiyomasa (1610)
- In use: 1467–1874 -1945(as military base)
- Materials: Wood, stone, plaster, tile
- Demolished: 1877 (Satsuma Rebellion)

Kumamoto Castle (熊本城, Kumamoto-jō) is a hilltop Japanese castle located in Chūō-ku, Kumamoto, in Kumamoto Prefecture. It was a large and well-fortified castle. The castle keep (天守閣, tenshukaku) is a concrete reconstruction built in 1960, but a number of ancillary wooden buildings remain of the original castle. Kumamoto Castle is considered one of the three premier castles in Japan, along with Himeji Castle and Matsumoto Castle. Thirteen structures in the castle complex are designated Important Cultural Property.

== History ==
Kumamoto Castle's history dates to 1467, when fortifications were established by Ideta Hidenobu. In 1496, these fortifications were expanded by Kanokogi Chikakazu. In 1588, Katō Kiyomasa was transferred to the early incarnation of Kumamoto Castle. From 1601 to 1607, Kiyomasa greatly expanded the castle, transforming it into a castle complex with 49 turrets, 18 turret gates, and 29 smaller gates. The smaller castle tower, built sometime after the keep, had several facilities including a well and kitchen. In 1610, the Honmaru Goten Palace was completed. The castle complex measures roughly 1.6 kilometres (0.99 mi) from east to west, and 1.2 kilometres (0.75 mi) from north to south. The castle keep is 30.3 metres (99 ft) tall.

The castle was besieged in 1877 during the Satsuma Rebellion, and the castle keep and other parts were burned down. The strength of the castle was demonstrated by its ability to withstand 19th-century weapons without falling. Saigō Takamori famously remarked, "I did not lose to the Meiji government. I lost to Lord Kiyomasa." 13 of the buildings in the castle complex were undamaged, and have been designated Important Cultural Properties. In 1960, the castle keep was reconstructed using concrete. From 1998 to 2008, the castle complex underwent restoration work, during which most of the 17th-century structures were rebuilt.

The signature curved stone walls, known as musha-gaeshi, as well as wooden overhangs, were designed to prevent attackers from penetrating the castle. Rock falls were also used as deterrents.

In nearby San-no-Maru Park is the Hosokawa Gyobu-tei, the former residence of the Hosokawa clan, the daimyō of Higo Province during the Edo period. This traditional wooden mansion has a noted Japanese garden located in its grounds.

In 2006, Kumamoto Castle was listed as one of the 100 Fine Castles of Japan by the Japan Castle Foundation. On December 7, 2007, a large-scale renovation of the Inner Palace was completed. A public ceremony for the restoration was held on April 20, 2008.

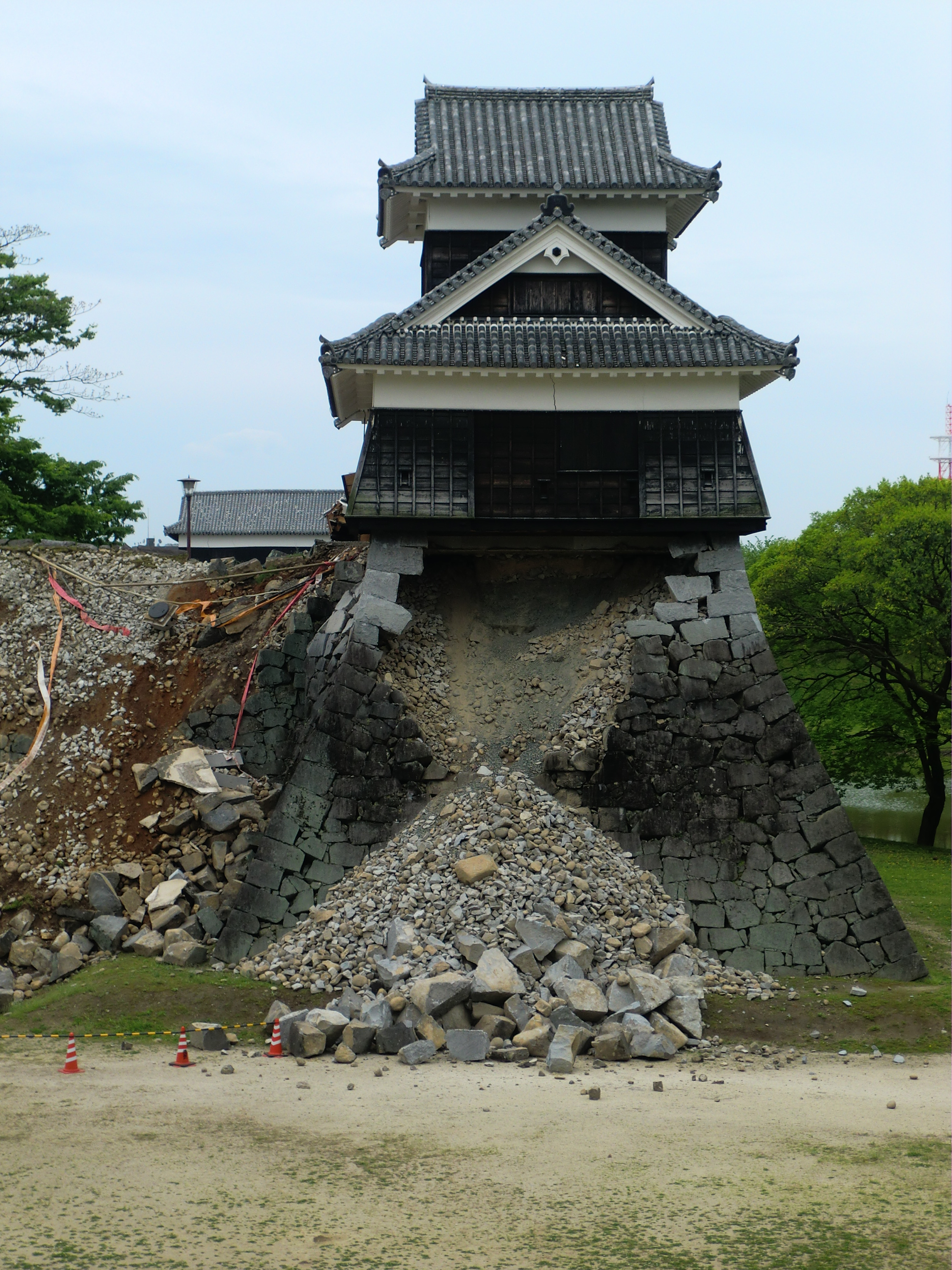
One of the turrets damaged by the 2016 earthquakes

The castle sustained damage in a magnitude 6.2 earthquake that struck at 9:26 pm on 14 April 2016, in Mashiki town in Kumamoto prefecture. This event is substantially similar to the magnitude-6.3 1889 Kumamoto earthquake which also damaged the castle. A stone wall at the foot of the keep partially collapsed in the 2016 quake, and several of the castle's shachihoko ornaments fell from the roof of the keep and broke apart. It sustained further extensive damage the next day on 15 April following a 7.3 magnitude earthquake where some portions were completely destroyed. While the keep itself withstood most of the earthquake with little structural damage, two of the castle's turrets were severely damaged and partially collapsed, more of the exterior walls at the foot of the keep also collapsed, and large amounts of kawara roof tiles on the keep's roof were also disrupted and fell from the roof as a result of the quake. The fallen roof tiles are actually deliberately designed to have done so – when the castle was constructed, such roof tiles were used so that in the event of an earthquake, the tiles would fall off the damaged roof, preventing it from being weighted down and collapsing into the building's interior.

Efforts to repair the castle began June 8, 2016. On April 7, 2018, the newly made shachihoko ornament had been installed on the top roof of the large tenshu tower with the second one being installed on April 12. The restoration of the main tower was completed in 2019. The restoration of the Nagabei Wall was completed in January 2021. The repair and restoration of the entire castle were scheduled for completion by 2037. However, in November 2022, Kumamoto Mayor Onishi Kazufumi announced that the reconstruction would take 15 years longer to complete, with full restoration scheduled for 2052.

A portion of the castle's walls were damaged in the 2026 Kumamoto earthquake.

== Gallery ==
Old photographs

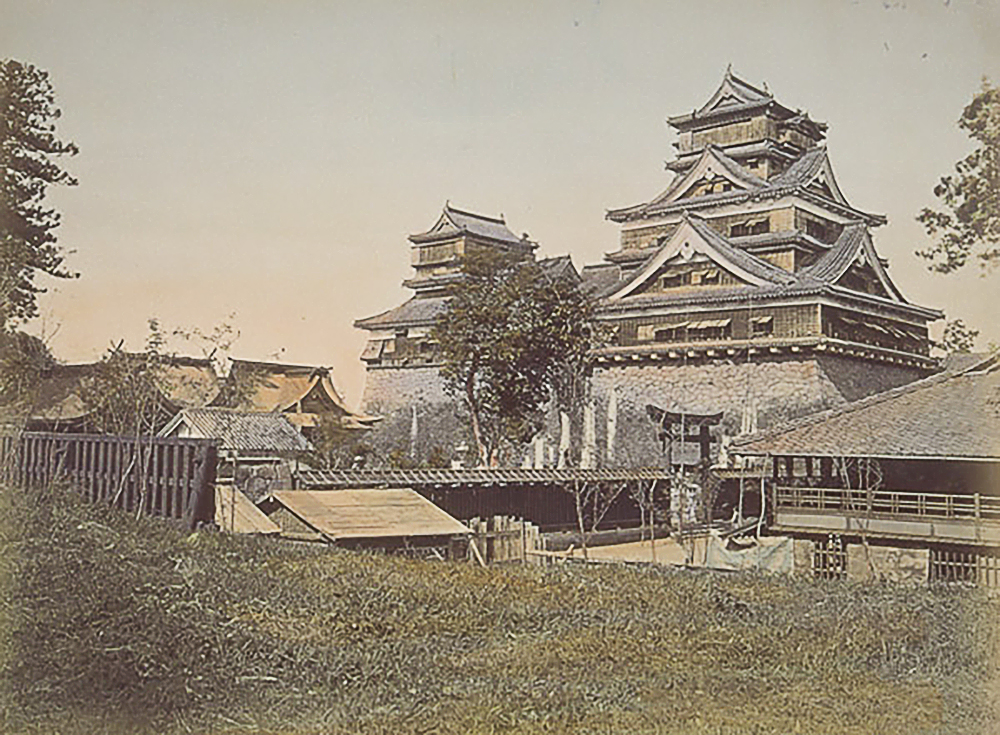
Castle in 1871–1874.

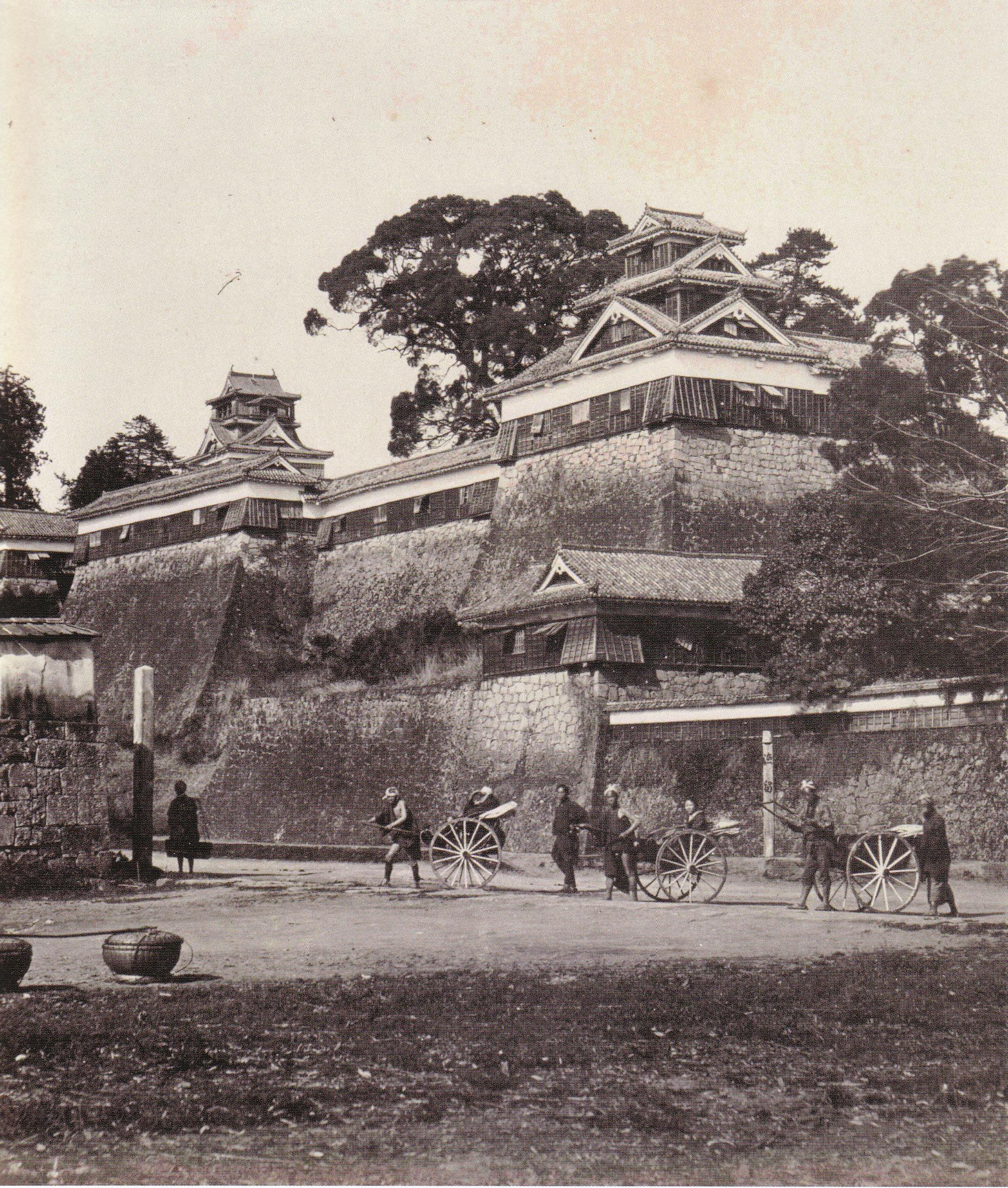
Castle in 1874.

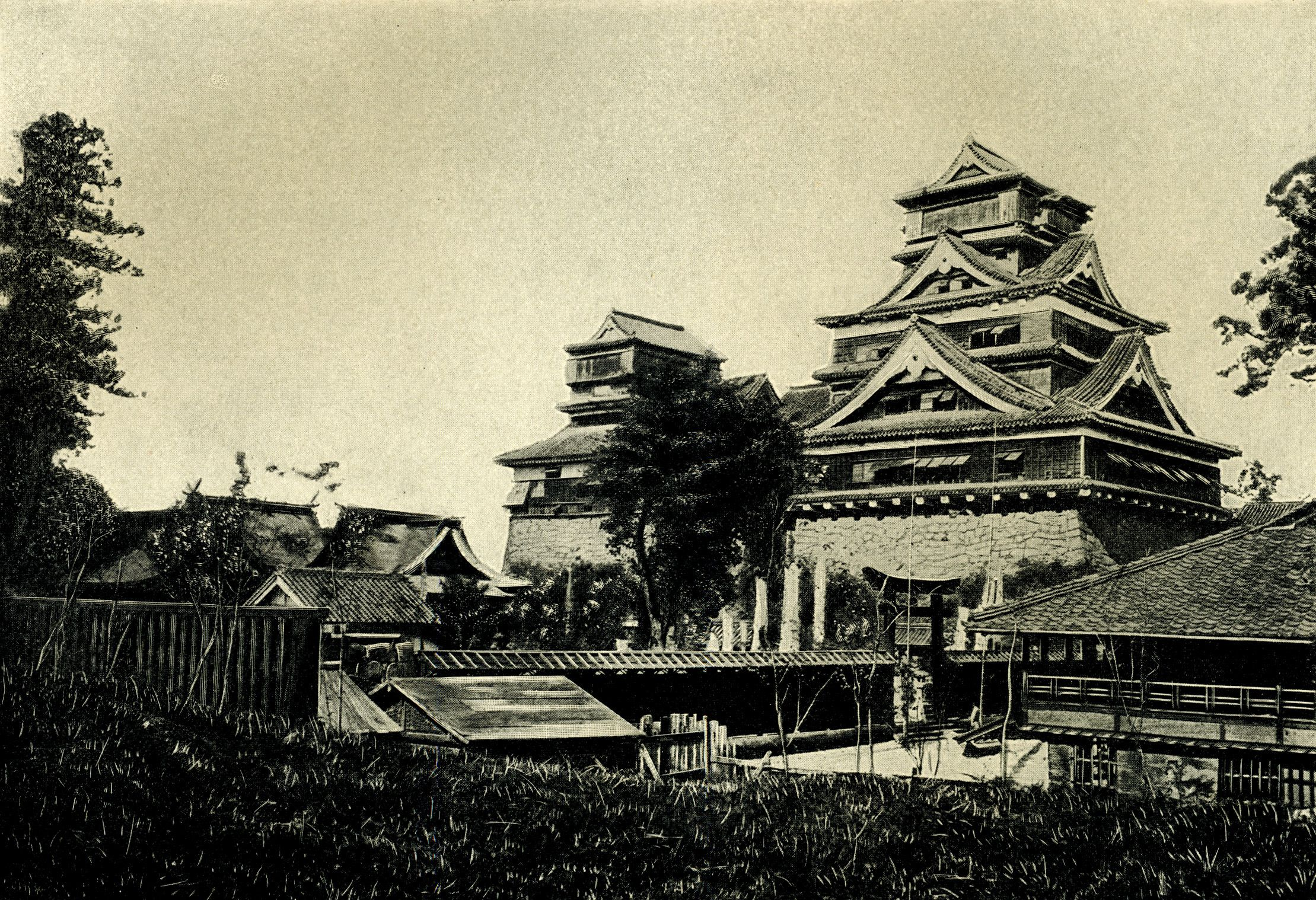
Castle before 1877.

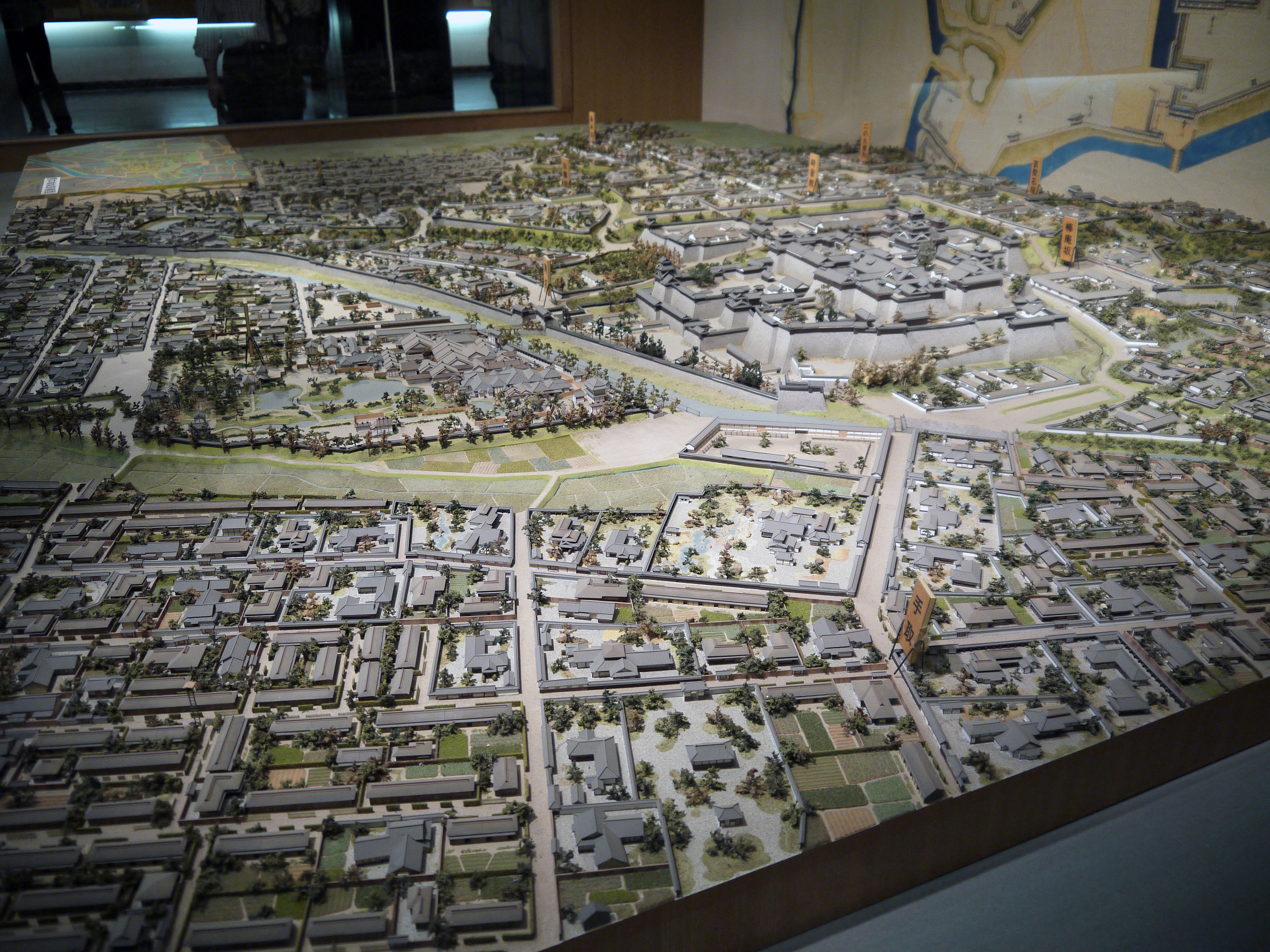
Model of the castle and city in the Edo period.

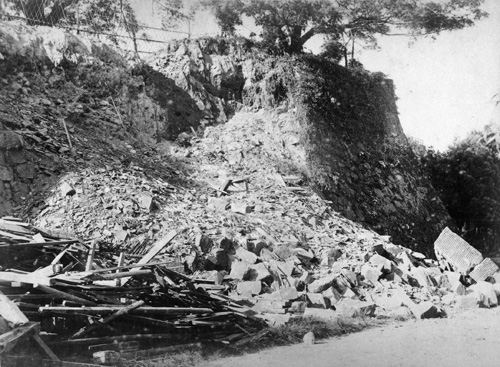
Damage to the Castle during the 1889 Kumamoto earthquake

Present exterior

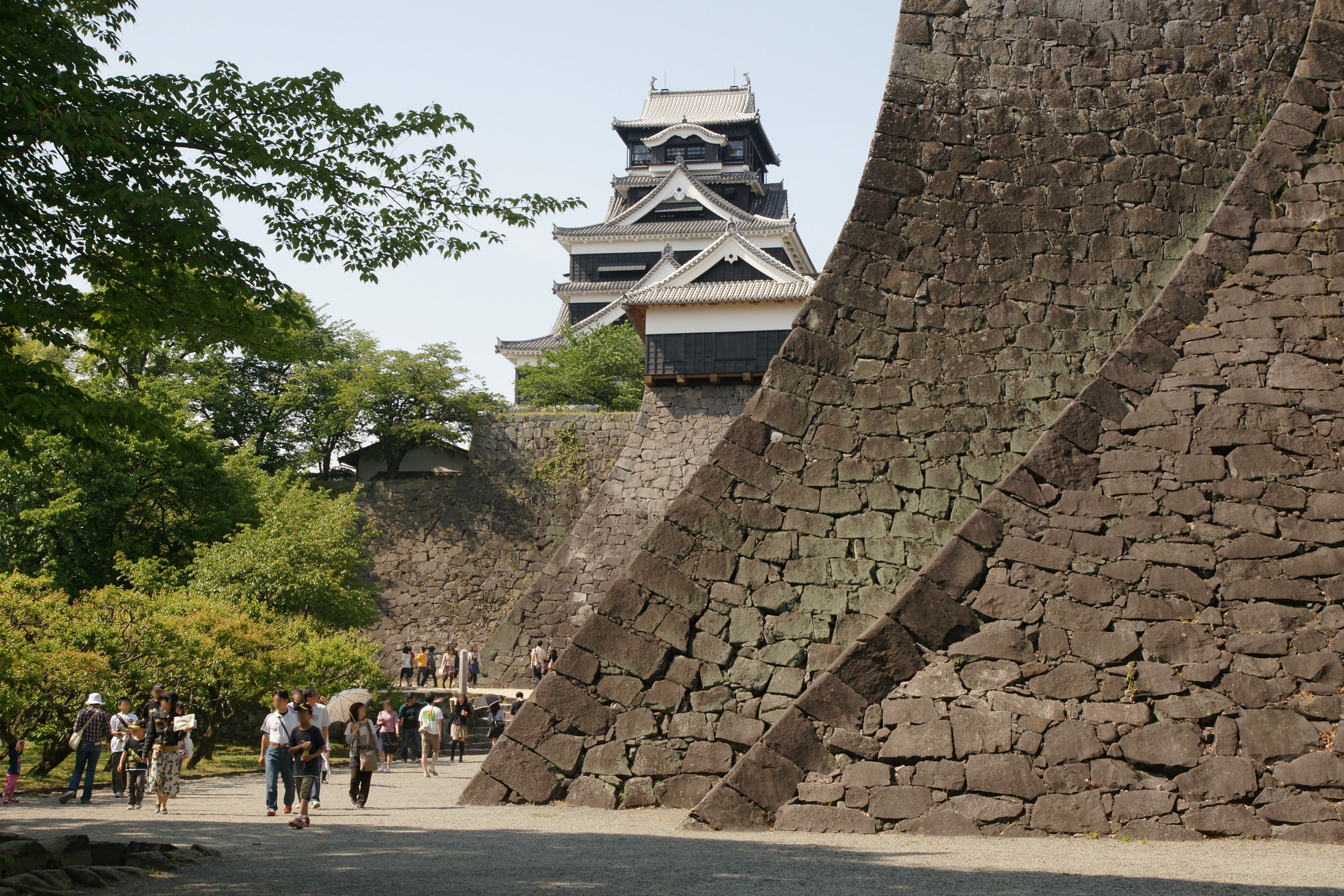
The steep stone walls.

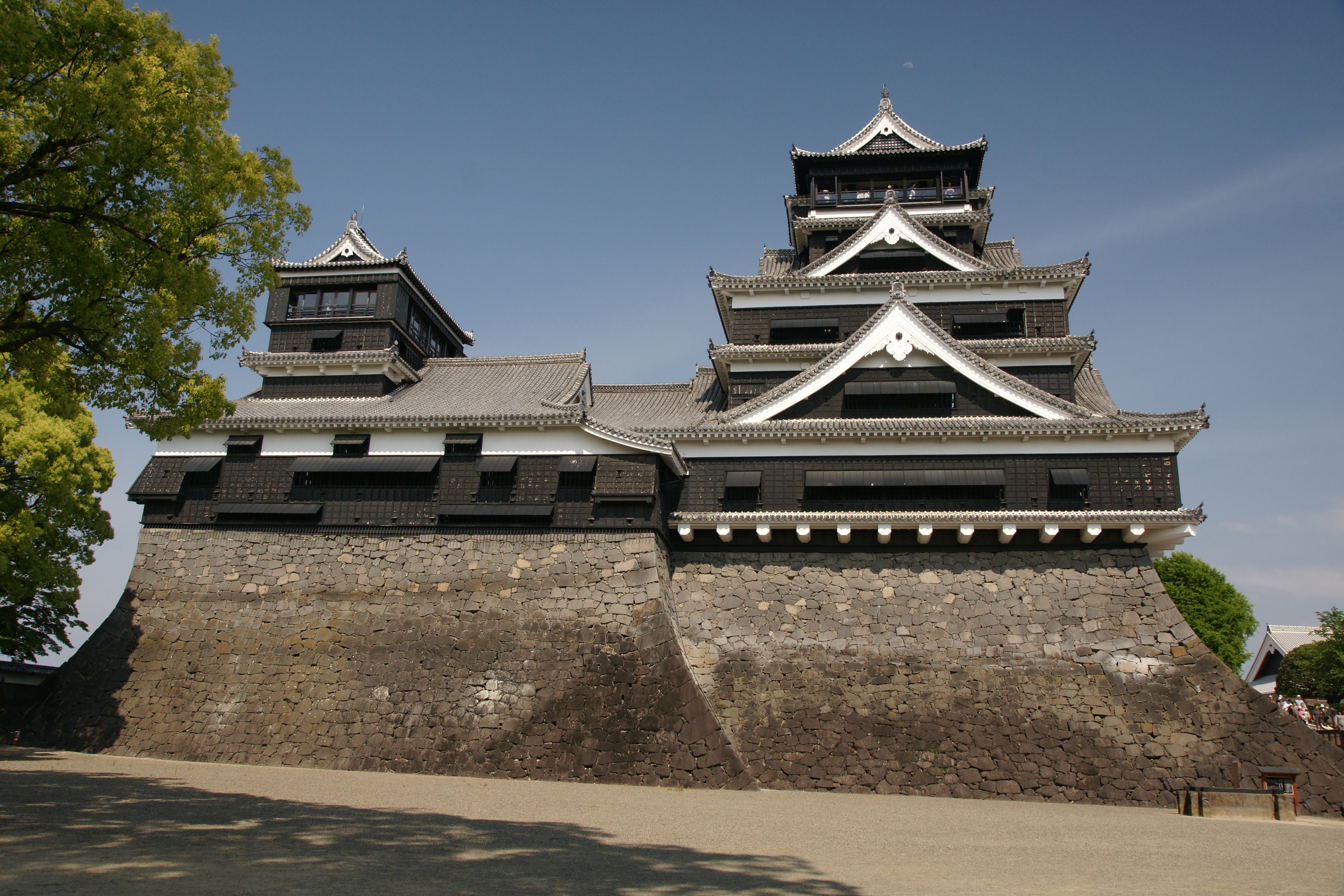

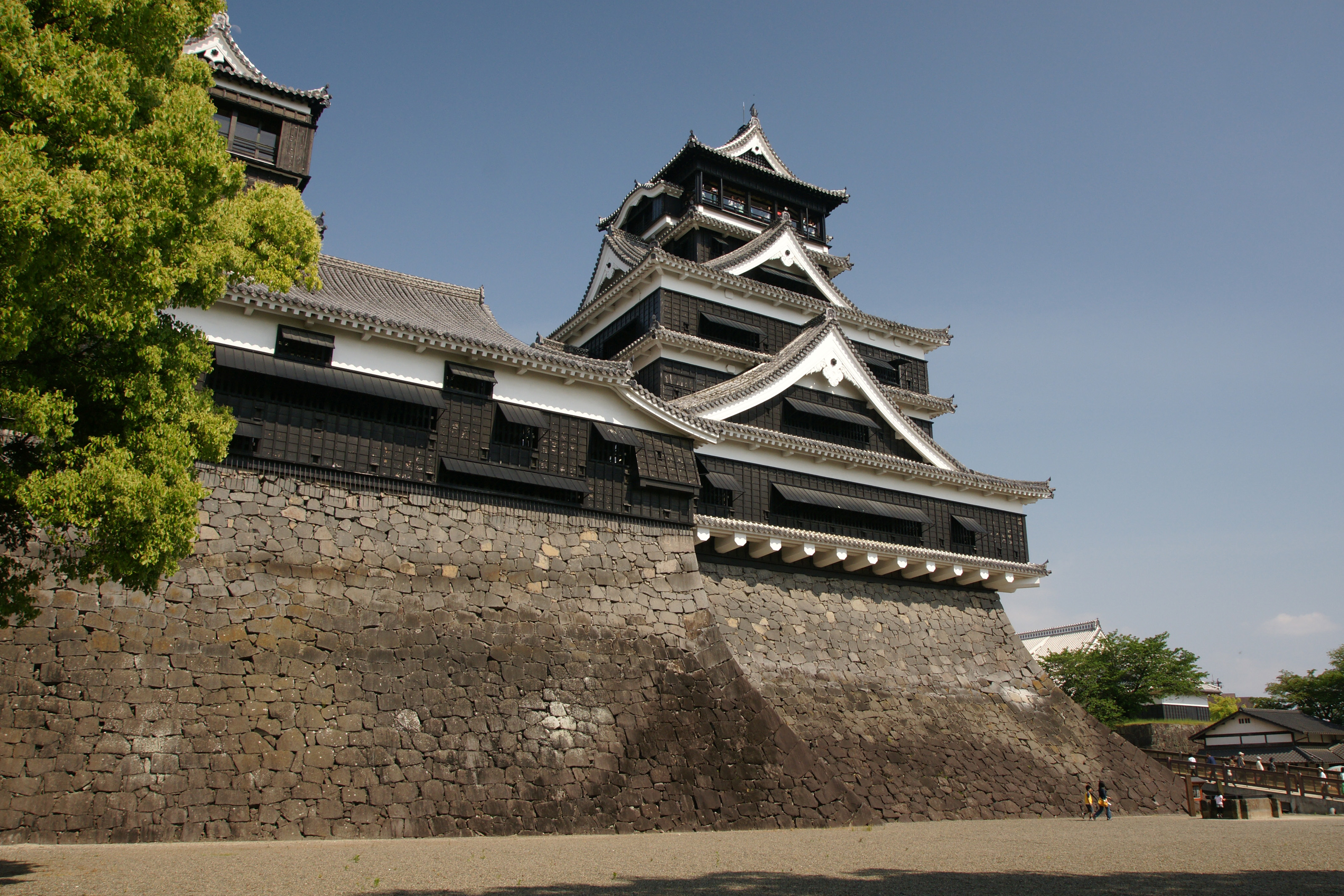

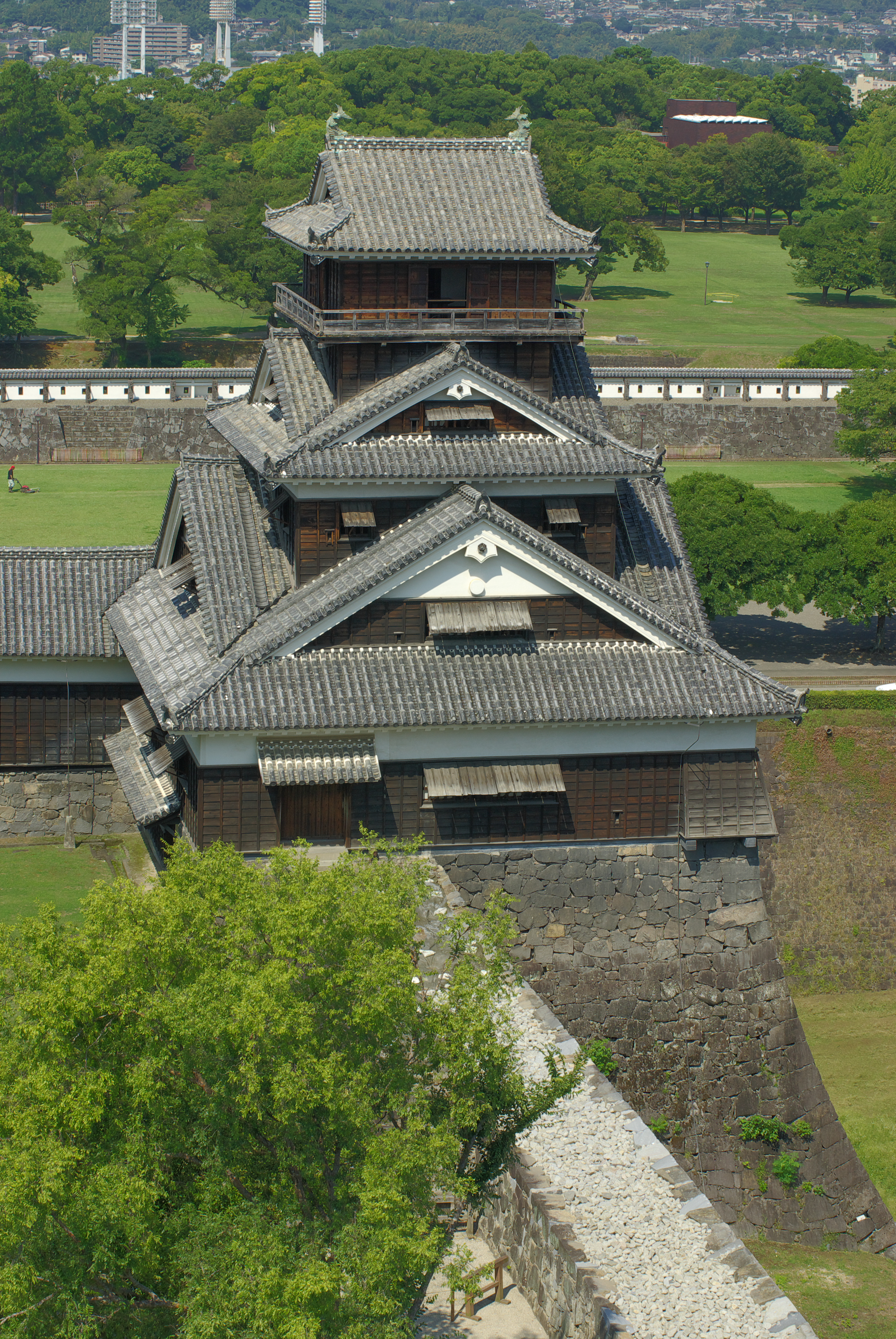
Uto yagura

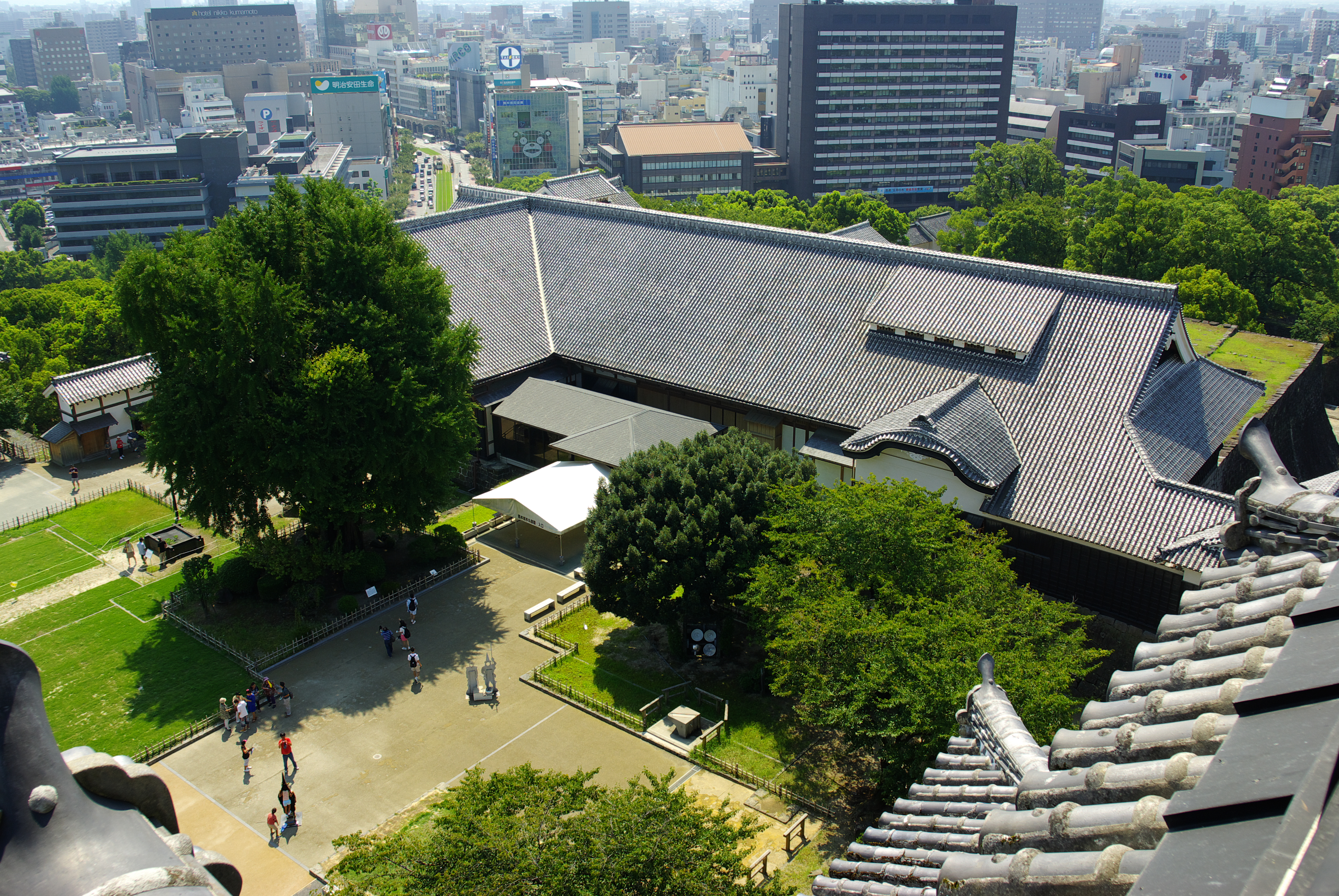
Honmaru Palace of Kumamoto Castle as seen from the Tenshu.

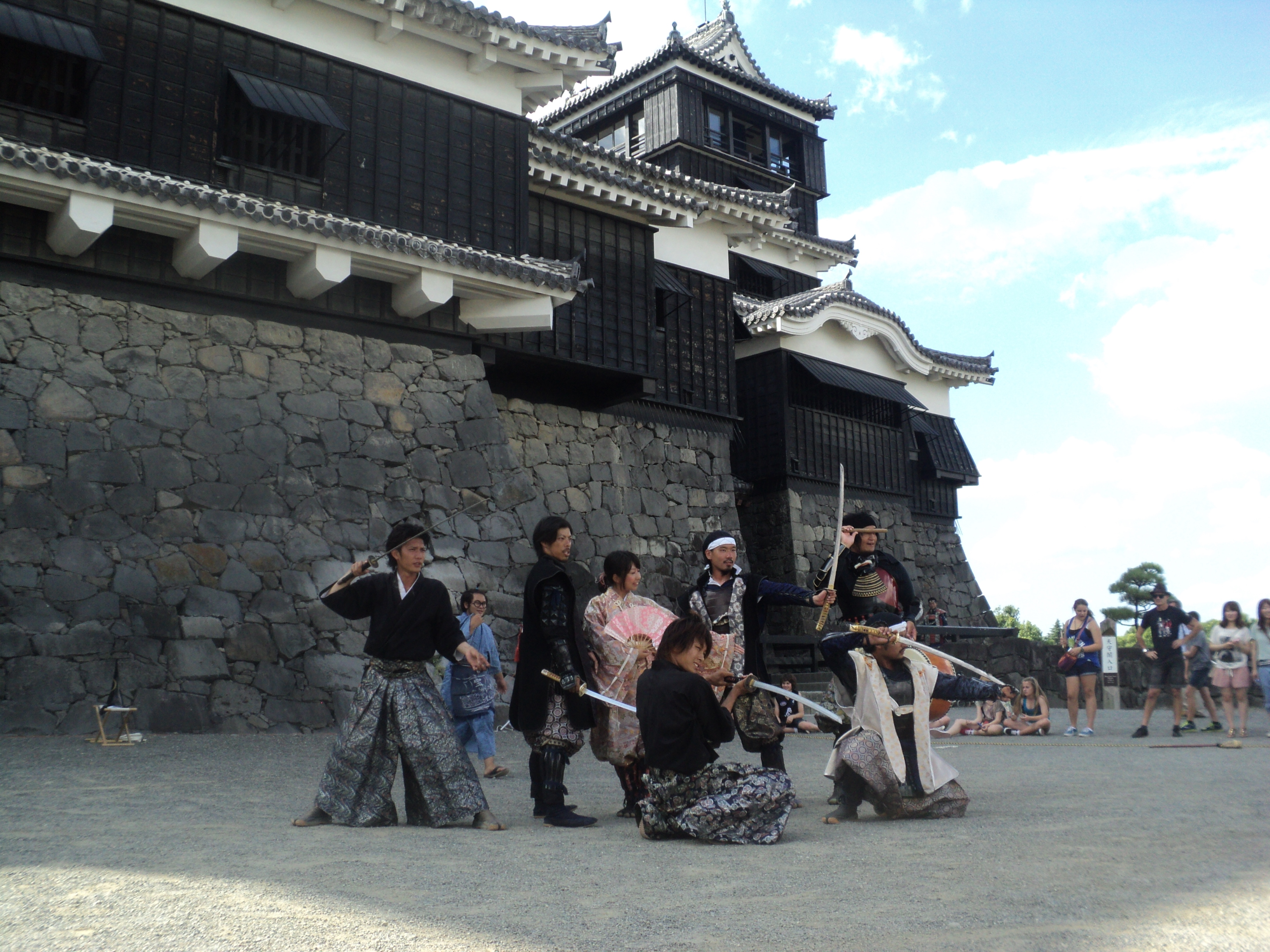
Regular cultural performances in front of the main castle.

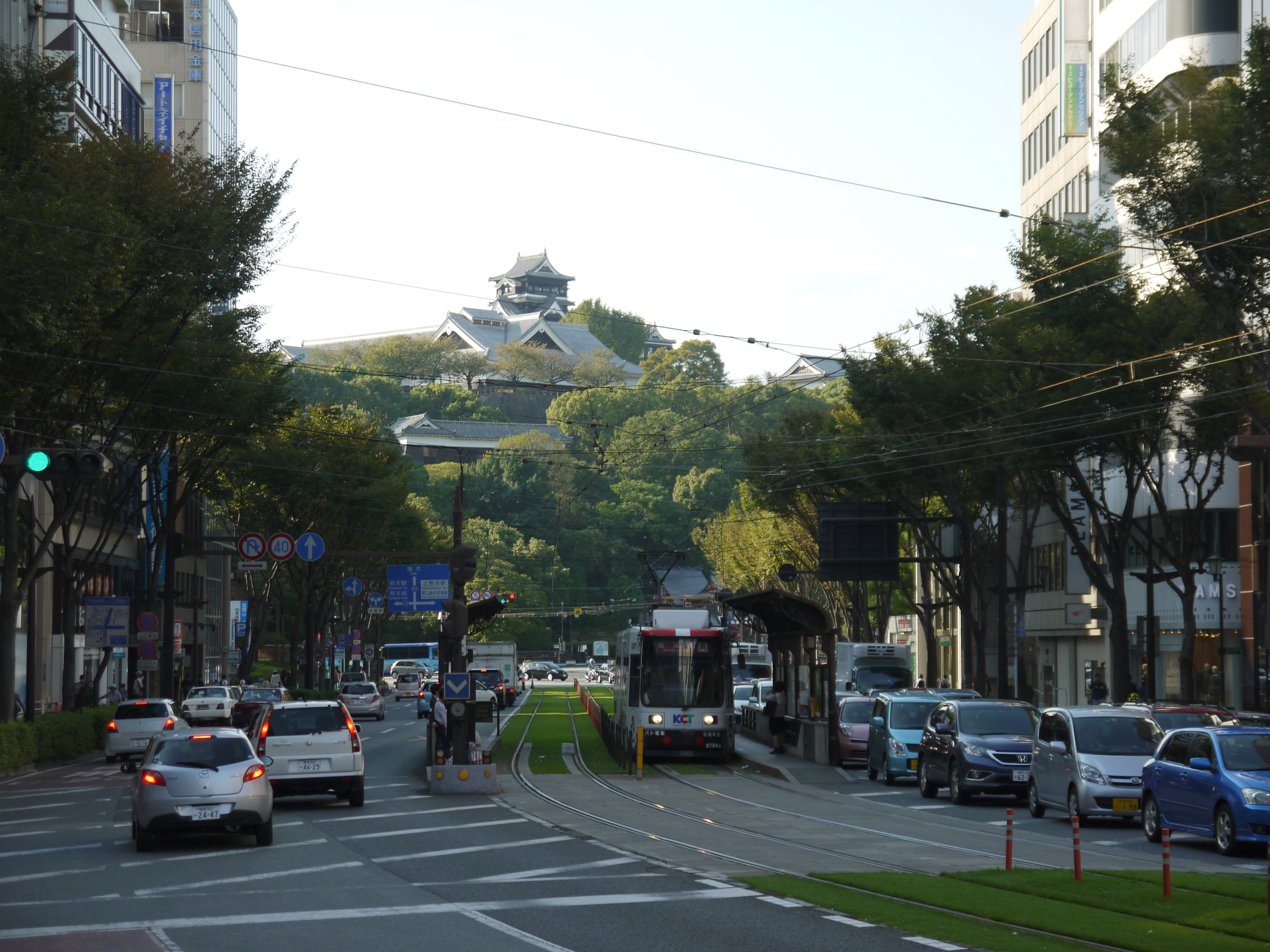
Castle and City Tram

== See also ==
- Japanese castle
- Sakuranobaba Josaien
- List of Special Places of Scenic Beauty, Special Historic Sites and Special Natural Monuments
- History of Kumamoto Prefecture
- 1889 Kumamoto earthquake

== Bibliography ==
- Benesch, Oleg. "Castles and the Militarisation of Urban Society in Imperial Japan," Transactions of the Royal Historical Society, Vol. 28 (Dec. 2018), pp. 107-134.
- Benesch, Oleg; Zwigenberg, Ran (2019). Japan's Castles: Citadels of Modernity in War and Peace. Cambridge: Cambridge University Press. ISBN 978-1-10848-194-6.
- De Lange, William (2021). An Encyclopedia of Japanese Castles. Groningen: Toyo Press. pp. 600 pages. ISBN 978-9492722300.
- Mitchelhill, Jennifer (2018). Samurai Castles: History – Architecture- Visitor's Guides. Osaka, Japan: Tuttle. ISBN 978-4-8053-1387-9.
- Motoo, Hinago (1986). Japanese Castles. Tokyo: Kodansha. ISBN 0-87011-766-1.
- Schmorleitz, Morton S. (1974). Castles in Japan. Tokyo: Charles E. Tuttle Co. pp. 114–116. ISBN 0-8048-1102-4.
