= 1889 Kumamoto earthquake =

6.3 Magnitude Earthquake in Japan

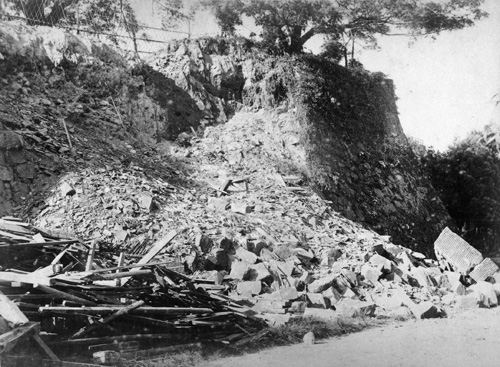
- Damage to the western flank of Kumamoto Castle, 29 July 1889

- Location within Kumamoto Prefecture
- Local date: 28 July 1889
- Local time: 23:40 JST (UTC+9)
- Magnitude: 6.3 M_{w}
- Depth: Very shallow
- Epicenter: 32.8°N 130.7°E
- Areas affected: Kumamoto Prefecture, Japan
- Tsunami: None
- Casualties: 20 dead

The 1889 Kumamoto earthquake occurred at 23:40 JST (14:40 UTC) on 28 July in the western part of Kumamoto, Japan. It was also called the Kinpozan earthquake (or Kinbozan earthquake, since its epicenter was the southern-eastern foot of Mount Kinpu) and its magnitude was 6.3.

Twenty people died (5 in Kumamoto City and 15 in Akita Gun, Kumamoto Prefecture) and hundreds of houses and parts of Kumamoto Castle were destroyed. The earthquake was the first major one after the establishment of the Seismological Society of Japan (in 1880), and its waves were recorded as far as Potsdam, Germany. Few houses were affected by fire since the quake occurred at midnight. Aftershocks occurred for five months, and some people had to sleep outdoors. According to Tadao Shimoma, the earthquake was a combination of the Tatsuda fault and unsuccessful volcanic activities, since there were injections of aerosol into the air at many places around Mt. Kinpo, Ninotake and Sannotake. He claimed the Kinpo mountains (now showing no volcanic activities) are similar to Mt. Unzen in petrology. The photographs were considered the earliest earthquake damage photos in Japan.

== See also ==
- List of earthquakes in Japan
- List of historical earthquakes
