= Aya =

Aya or AYA may refer to:

== Films ==
- Aya (1990 film), an Australian film
- Aya (2012 film), a short

== Music ==
- Aya (band), Slovak rock band
- Aya (British singer), British singer, songwriter and actress
- Aya (musician), English musician
- Aya (Japanese singer), Japanese rock artist
- Aya (album), third studio album by French singer Aya Nakamura
- "Aya" (song), a song by K-pop girl group Mamamoo
- Naoki "Aya" Okawa, guitarist of the Japanese group Psycho le Cému

== Places ==
- Aya, Miyazaki, a town in Japan
- Aya Biosphere Reserve, Japan
- Aya Castle, a castle in Japan
- Cape Aya, Black Sea coast, Ukraine
- Aya or Agia (Meteora), a rock in Thessaly, Greece
- 55565 Aya, a large trans-Neptunian object

== People ==
- Aya (queen), an Egyptian queen
- Aya (given name), a given name (including a list of people, fictional characters and a mythological goddess)
- Ibrahima Aya (born 1967), Malian writer
- Ramzi Aya (born 1990), Italian footballer

== Other uses ==
- Aya (exhibit), immersive experiential attraction, Wafi Mall, Dubai, UAE
- Aya (goddess), Akkadian goddess
- Aya de los Infantes, Spanish royal court office
- Aya (DC Comics), a character from DC Comics
- Aya Group, a business conglomerate in Uganda
- Association of Yale Alumni
- American Youth Academy, a school in Tampa, Florida
- Antranik Youth Association, Lebanon
- Armenian Youth Association
- AYA, acronym meaning adolescent and young adult oncology
- Neta Aya, a battery electric subcompact crossover SUV

== See also ==
- Ayah, a verse in the Qur'an
- Ayaka, name
- Ayako, name
- Ayana (name)
