= Ayako =

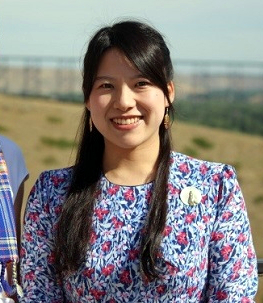
- Ayako Moriya
- Pronunciation: Á-ya-ko
- Gender: Female
- Language: Japanese

Origin
- Meaning: Different meanings depending on the kanji used.

Other names
- See also: Aya; Ayaka; Ayame; Ayami; Ayana; Ayane; Ayano; Ayasa

Ayako is a feminine Japanese given name.

== Written forms ==
Ayako can be written using different kanji characters and can mean:

- 文子, "writings, child"
- 綾子, "twill, child"
- 絢子, "kimono design, child"
- 彩子, "coloring, child"
- 順子, "order, child"
- 礼子, "courtesy, child"
- 亜矢子, "Asia, arrow, child"
- 安夜子, "peaceful, night, child"

The name can also be written in hiragana (あやこ) or katakana (アヤコ).

== People with the name ==
- Ayako Daidōji (大道寺 あや子; born 1948), Japanese far-left militant and fugitive
- Ayako Fuchigami (渕上 綾子; born 1975), Japanese politician
- Ayako Fuji (藤 あや子; born 1961), Japanese enka singer
- Ayako Fujiki (アヤコ・フジキ), Japanese pianist, composer, and Steinway Artist
- Ayako Fujitani (藤谷 文子; born 1979), Japanese writer, actress and daughter of Steven Seagal
- Ayako Hamada (浜田 文子; born 1981), Japanese-Mexican professional wrestler
- Ayako Hara (原 綾子; born 1988), Japanese model and beauty pageant winner
- Ayako Hirose (広瀬 綾子; born 1969), Japanese tennis player
- Ayako Hosomi (細見 綾子; 1907–1997), Japanese haiku poet and publisher
- Ayako Ikeda (池田 綾子; born 1978), Japanese singer-songwriter
- Ayako Imoto (井本 絢子; born 1986), Japanese comedian
- Ayako Ishigaki (石垣 綾子; 1903–1996), Japanese-born American journalist
- Ayako Ito (伊藤 綾子; born 1980), Japanese announcer
- Ayako Jinnouchi (陣内 綾子; born 1987), Japanese middle-distance runner
- Ayako Kawasumi (川澄 綾子; born 1976), Japanese voice actress and pop singer
- Ayako Kimura (木村 文子; born 1988), Japanese hurdler
- Ayako Kitamoto (北本 綾子; born 1983), Japanese women's footballer
- Ayako Matsumura (松村 亜矢子; born 1982), Japanese synchronized swimmer
- Ayako Miura (三浦 綾子; 1922–1999), Japanese novelist
- Ayako Miyazaki (宮崎 綾子; born 1982), Japanese former cricketer
- Ayako Moriya (守谷 絢子; born 1990), former Japanese princess
- Ayako Nakano (dancer) (中野 綾子; born 1977), Japanese ballerina
- Ayako Nakano (swimmer) (中野 亜弥子; born 1973), Japanese swimmer
- Ayako Nakayama (中山 綾子; born 1987), Japanese cricketer
- Ayako Nishikawa (西川 史子; born 1971), Japanese physician and television personality
- Ayako Okamoto (岡本 綾子; born 1951), Japanese golfer
- Ayako Ōnuma (大沼 綾子; born 1979), Japanese volleyball player
- Ayako Saitoh (born 1956), Japanese wheelchair curler and former archer
- Ayako Sakuramoto (櫻本 絢子; born 1995), Japanese badminton player
- Ayako Sana (眞 恵子; born 1985), Japanese volleyball player
- Ayako Sanada (真田 彩子; born 1972), Japanese shogi player
- Ayako Sano (佐野 禮子; 1913–2003), the granddaughter of Emperor Meiji
- Ayako Sato (佐藤 綾子; born 1986), Japanese professional wrestler
- Ayako Shiraishi (白石 文子; born 1963), Japanese voice actress
- Ayako Shirasaki (白崎 彩子), Japanese jazz musician
- Ayako Shōda (正田 絢子; born 1981), Japanese sport wrestler
- Ayako Sono (曽野 綾子; 1931–2025), Japanese writer
- Ayako Suzukawa (鈴川 絢子; born 1991), Japanese YouTuber and comedian
- Ayako Suzuki (鈴木 亜弥子; born 1987), Japanese former para badminton player
- Ayako Tanahashi (棚橋 绚子; 1839–1939), Japanese educator and school administrator
- Ayako Tsubaki (椿 文子; born 1969), Japanese speed skater
- Ayako Tsuru (born 1941), Mexican artist
- Ayako Uehara (golfer) (上原 彩子; born 1983), Japanese golfer
- Ayako Uehara (pianist) (上原 彩子; born 1980), Japanese classical pianist
- Ayako Wakao (若尾 文子; born 1933), Japanese actress
- Ayako Yoshida (吉田 理子; born 1976), Japanese rower
- Ayako Yoshikawa (吉川 綾子; born 1933), Japanese sprinter and long jumper
- Ayako Yoshitani (吉谷 彩子; born 1991), Japanese actress

== Fictional characters ==
- Ayako (彩子), a character in the manga series Slam Dunk
- Ayako Katagiri (片桐 彩子), a character in the video game Tokimeki Memorial
- Ayako Yuuki (結城 綾子), a character in the video game series Variable Geo
