= Ayaka (given name) =

- Pronunciation: Japanese: [ajaka]
- Gender: female
- Language: Japanese

Origin
- Meaning: different meanings depending on the kanji used

Other names
- See also: Aya; Ayako; Ayane

Ayaka (あやか, アヤカ) is a common feminine Japanese given name.

== Written forms ==
Ayaka can be written using different kanji characters and can mean:

- 彩華, "colorful, flower"
- 彩夏, "colorful, summer"
- 彩霞, "colorful, mist"
- 彩香, "colorful, scent"
- 彩風, "colorful, wind"
- 綾花, "design, flower"
- 綾香, "design, scent"
- 綾風, "design, wind"
- 綾夏, "design, summer"
- 綾華, "design, Flower"
- 絢花, "kimono design, flower"
- 絢香, "kimono design, scent"
- 彩花, "colorful flower"

The name can also be written in hiragana あやか or katakana アヤか.

== People with the name ==
- Ayaka, Japanese singer whose real name is Ayaka Iida (飯田 絢香)
- Ayaka Asai (朝井 彩加; born 1992), Japanese actress
- Ayaka Fujimoto (藤本 彩花), Japanese voice actress and singer
- Ayaka Fukuhara (福原 綾香; born 1989), Japanese voice actress
- Ayaka Furue (古江 彩佳; born 2000), Japanese professional golfer
- Ayaka Hamasaki (浜崎 朱加; born 1982), Japanese female mixed martial artist, judoka and submission grappler
- Ayaka Hibiki (響 綾香; born 1974), Japanese stage actress and voice actress
- Ayaka Hirahara (平原 綾香; born 1984), Japanese pop singer
- Ayaka Hironaka (弘中 綾香; born 1991), Japanese TV announcer
- Ayaka Hirose (広瀬 彩海; born 1999), Japanese member of the Magnolia Factory
- Ayaka Hosoda (細田 采花; born 1995), Japanese figure skater
- Ayaka Ichinose (一ノ瀬 文香; born 1980), Japanese gravure idol and LGBT rights activist
- Ayaka Igasaki (伊ヶ崎 綾香), Japanese voice actress, scriptwriter and voice drama producer
- Ayaka Ikehara (池原 綾香; born 1990), Japanese handball player
- Ayaka Imamura (今村 彩夏; born 1993), Japanese former voice actress
- Ayaka Inoue (井上 綾香; born 1995), Japanese professional footballer
- Ayaka Itō (伊藤 彩華; born 1987), Japanese pop singer
- Ayaka Kamata (鎌田 彩樺; born 2003), Japanese member of the Super Girls (Japanese group)
- Ayaka Kawasaki (河崎 綾佳; born 1991), Japanese female badminton player
- Ayaka Kikuchi (singer) (菊地 あやか; born 1993), Japanese singer, actress, model and idol
- Ayaka Kikuchi (speed skater) (菊池 彩花; born 1987), Japanese speed skater
- Ayaka Kitazawa (北沢 綾香; born 1989), Japanese singer
- Ayaka Komatsu (小松 彩夏; born 1986), Japanese model, gravure idol and actress
- Ayaka Konno (紺野 彩夏; born 1999), Japanese actress and model
- Ayaka Kōra (高良 彩花; born 2001), Japanese long jumper
- Ayaka Kuno (久野 綾香; born 1987), Japanese sprint canoer
- Ayaka Maekawa (前川 綾香; born 1983), Japanese tennis player
- Ayaka Matsumoto (松本 亜弥華; born 1988), Japanese volleyball player
- Ayaka Michigami (道上 彩花; born 1994), Japanese professional footballer
- Ayaka Miyao (宮尾 綾香; born 1983), Japanese retired professional boxer
- Ayaka Miyauchi (宮内 彩香; born 1983), Japanese Nak Muay and kickboxer
- Ayaka Miyoshi (三吉 彩花; born 1996), Japanese actress, model, and former idol
- Ayaka Mizusawa (水澤 彩佳; born 1994), Japanese former member of the NGT48
- Ayaka Nagate (長手 絢香; born 1981), Japanese actress and former singer
- Ayaka Nanase (七瀬 彩夏; born 1994), Japanese voice actress
- Ayaka Nishikawa (西川 彩華; born 1996), Japanese professional footballer
- Ayaka Nishimura (西村 綾加; born 1989), Japanese field hockey player
- Ayaka Nishiwaki (西脇 綾香; born 1989), Japanese musician and dancer
- Ayaka Noguchi (野口 彩佳; born 1995), Japanese professional footballer
- Ayaka Ōhashi (大橋 彩香; born 1994), Japanese voice actress and singer
- Ayaka Ohmichi (大道 彩香; born 1996), Japanese actress
- Ayaka Okuno (奥野 彩加; born 1995), Japanese tennis player
- Ayaka Ōshima (大島 綾華; born 2003), Japanese women's professional shogi player
- Ayaka Ōta (太田 彩夏; born 2000), Japanese former member of the SKE48
- Ayaka Otsu (大津 綾香; born 1992), Japanese politician and former child actress
- Ayaka Saitō (齋藤 彩夏; born 1988), Japanese voice actress
- Ayaka Saito (footballer) (齊藤 彩佳; born 1991), Japanese professional footballer
- Ayaka Saito (karateka) (齊藤 綾夏), Japanese karateka
- Ayaka Sasaki (佐々木 彩夏; born 1996), Japanese idol
- Ayaka Sayama (佐山 彩香; born 1993), Japanese gravure idol
- Ayaka Shimizu (清水 彩香; born 1987), Japanese voice actress
- Ayaka Shiomura (塩村 文夏; born 1978), Japanese politician
- Ayaka Suwa (諏訪 彩花; born 1988), Japanese voice actress
- Ayaka Suzuki (鈴木 彩香; born 1989), Japanese rugby union and sevens player
- Ayaka Tachibana (立花 彩夏), Japanese former member of the Yumemiru Adolescence
- Ayaka Takahashi (高橋 礼華; born 1990), Japanese retired badminton player
- Ayaka Takamoto (高本 彩花; born 1998), Japanese former member of the Hinatazaka46
- Ayaka Tano (太野 彩香; born 1997), Japanese former member of the NGT48
- Ayaka Toko (床 亜矢可; born 1994), Japanese ice hockey player
- Ayaka Umeda (梅田 彩佳; born 1989), Japanese former idol and singer
- Ayaka Wada (和田 彩花; born 1994), Japanese singer and idol
- Ayaka Watanabe (渡辺 彩華; born 1997), Japanese mixed martial artist
- Ayaka Yamashita (footballer) (山下 杏也加; born 1995), Japanese professional footballer
- Ayaka Yamashita (voice actress) (山下 亜矢香), Japanese voice actress
- Ayaka Yasumoto (安本 彩花; born 1998), Japanese member of the Shiritsu Ebisu Chugaku
- Ayaka Yoshimoto (吉本 彩華; born 1996), Japanese former member of the Nogizaka46
- Ayaka Yoshimura (吉村 綾花; born 1990), Japanese former member of the Sweets (group)

== Fictional characters ==
- Ayaka Kuroe, a character from the anime/manga series/light novel Strike Witches
- Ayaka Shindou, a character from anime and light novel series Beyond the Boundary
- Ayaka Usami, a main character from anime and manga series Gravitation
- Ayaka Yukihiro, a supporting character in the anime and manga series Mahou Sensei Negima
- Ayaka Kagari, a main character from the anime and manga series Witch Craft Works
- Ayaka Shinozaki, a character from the light novel series Heaven's Memo Pad
- Ayaka Sunohara, a character from the anime and manga series Miss Caretaker of Sunohara-sou
- Ayaka Kamisato, a character in the 2020 video game Genshin Impact
- Ayaka Tateyama, a character from the multi-media franchise Kagerou Project
