= 文乃 =

文乃 is an Asian given name.

It may refer to:

- Ayano, Japanese feminine given name
- Fumino, Japanese feminine given name
