= Aya (given name) =

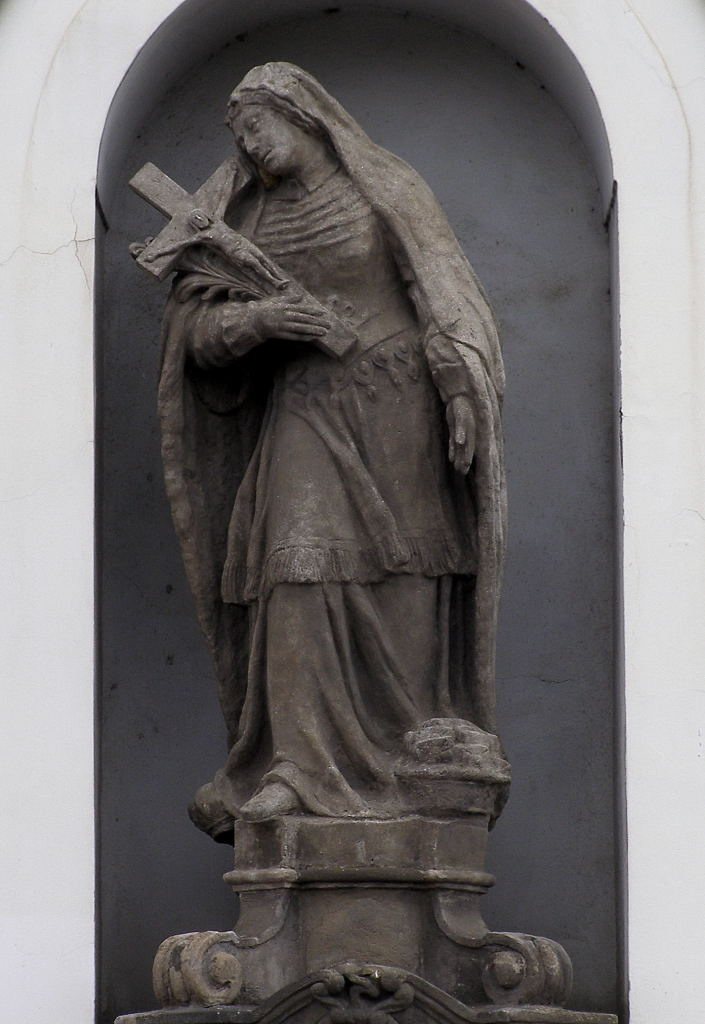
- Statue of Saint Aya
- Pronunciation: /ˈɑːjə/
- Gender: Both
- Language: Turkish, Japanese, Amazigh, Hebrew, Arabic, English, Danish

Origin
- Meaning: Old German: "sword" Turkish: "angel" Amazigh: "moon" Chemehuevi: "tortoise" Hebrew: "to fly swiftly" Arabic: "sign," "miracle," or "verse"

Other names
- See also: Ayako; Ayaka; Ayame; Ayana; Ayano

Aya is a unisex name with multiple meanings in many different languages. In Old German, Aya means "sword".

Aya (あや, アヤ) is a common female Japanese given name meaning "design", "colorful" or "beautiful". Aya is an Arabic feminine name written as آية meaning "wonderful", "amazing", "miracle" or "verse". Aya (איה) is also in use in Hebrew and means "to fly swiftly" or "bird". In Amazigh it means "moon", from Ayyur ⴰⵢⵓⵔ the god of the moon in Amazigh mythology. In Mongolian, similar to Turkish, it means "goodness", "music", and "melody". In Chemehuevi, Aya means "tortoise". In Baoule on the Ivory Coast, Aya is often given to a female born on Friday.

In the Raute language of Nepal, Aya refers to one's sister-in-law. The word originates from the Proto-Tibeto-Burman ’ay (alternate form yay) meaning "mother". In the Urdu language the word Aya refers to bees, caretaker, or nurse for young children. Typically in Pakistan ayas work in early childhood centres or primary schools.

In Turkish-Altaic mythology, Aya symbolizes the good soul. All the seventeen types of benevolent angels who live in the sky are also called Ayas. They are seen as the source of abundance and creativity on Earth. The word comes from Ay ("moon" in Turkish). Ayaçı means "creative soul".

There are several alternative spellings including Ayah and Aiya. There is also an African Adinkra symbol called an Aya, which is a fern. It is a symbol of endurance and resourcefulness.

== Written forms in Japanese ==
Aya can be written using different kanji characters and can mean:

- 絢, "kimono design"
- 綾, "twill" "design" "complicated reason"
- 彩, "coloring"
- 理, "truth, logic"
- 亜矢, "sub-(Ateji), arrow"
- 亜弥, "sub-(Ateji), all the more"
- 亜夜, "sub-(Ateji), night"
- 順, "order, sequence, turn"
- 文, "writings"

The name can also be written in hiragana or katakana.

== People ==
=== Given name ===
- Aya (queen), Ancient Egyptian queen during the 18th century BCE
- Saint Aya (died c. 711), Belgian Catholic saint
- Aya Brown (born 1995), American artist
- Aya Cash (born 1982), American actress
- Aya Chiry (born 1986/1987), Lebanese footballer
- Aya Domenig (born 1972), Japanese-Swiss filmmaker
- Aya Jamal Eddine (born 1997), Lebanese footballer
- Aya El Aouni (born 2005), Moroccan tennis player
- Aya Endō (綾, born 1980), Japanese voice actress
- Aya Fujita (綾, born 1987), Japanese shogi player
- Aya Goda (彩, born 1967), Japanese painter
- Aya Hirano (綾, born 1987), Japanese voice actress
- Aya Hirayama (あや, born 1984), Japanese actress
- Aya Hisakawa (綾, born 1968), Japanese voice actress
- Aya Ishiguro (彩, born 1978), Japanese singer
- Aya Ishizu (彩, born 1972), Japanese voice actress
- Aya Itō, better known as Luna Haruna (born 1991), Japanese singer and fashion model
- Aya Jones (born 1994), French model
- Aya Al Jurdi (born 1998), Lebanese footballer
- Aya Kamikawa (あや (born 1968), Japanese politician
- Aya Kamiki (彩矢, born 1985), Japanese singer
- Aya Kanno (文, born 1980), Japanese manga artist
- Aya Kawai (彩, born 1975), Japanese figure skater
- Aya Kida (綾, born 1974), Japanese photographer
- Aya Kiguchi (亜矢, born 1985), Japanese race queen and gravure idol
- Aya Kitō (亜也, 1962–1988), Japanese writer
- Aya Kōda (文, 1904–1990), Japanese essayist and novelist
- Aya Korem (born 1980), Israeli singer and songwriter
- Aya Koren (born 1979), Israeli actress
- Aya Kyogoku (あや, born c. 1981), Japanese video game director and producer
- Aya Liu (born 1978), Taiwanese actress and presenter
- Aya Majdi (born 1994), Qatari table tennis player
- Aya Matsuura (亜弥, born 1986), Japanese singer
- Aya Medany (born 1988), Egyptian pentathlete
- Aya Mikami (彩, born 1984), Japanese volleyball player
- Aya Miyama (あや, born 1985), Japanese soccer player
- Aya Nakahara (アヤ, born 1973), Japanese manga artist
- Aya Nakamura, Malian-born French pop singer
- Aya Nakano (綾, born 1985), Japanese singer
- Aya Ohori (彩, born 1996), Japanese badminton player
- Aya Okamoto (綾, born 1982), Japanese actress
- Aya Ōmasa (大政 絢, born 1991), Japanese model and actress
- Aya Sameshima (彩, born 1987), Japanese soccer player
- Aya Shehata (born 2003), Egyptian taekwondo practitioner
- Aya Shibata (阿弥, born 1993), Japanese tarento and announcer
- Aya Shimokozuru (綾, born 1982), Japanese soccer player
- Aya Stefanowicz (born 1983), Polish singer of the gothic-metal band UnSun
- Aya Sugimoto (彩, born 1968), Japanese actress
- Aya Sumika (born 1980), American actress
- Aya Suzaki (綾, born 1986), Japanese voice actress
- Aya Tademaru, better known as Haruka Ayase (born 1985), Japanese actress
- Aya Takano (綾, born 1976), Japanese artist and science fiction essayist
- Aya Takano (swimmer) (綾, born 1994), Japanese swimmer
- Aya Takeuchi (亜弥, born 1986), Japanese rugby sevens player
- Aya Tanimura (born 1980), Australian-Japanese writer and director
- Aya Tarek, Egyptian artist
- Aya Terakawa (綾, born 1984), Japanese backstroke swimmer
- Aya Traoré (born 1983), Senegalese basketball player
- Aya Uchida (彩, born 1986), a Japanese voice actress
- Aya Ueto (彩, born 1985), Japanese actress
- Aya Umemura (梅村 礼; born 1976), Japanese table tennis player
- Aya Yamane (山根 綺; born 1997), Japanese voice actress and singer
- Aya Yokoshima (横嶋 彩; born 1990), Japanese handball player

=== Surname ===
- Ramzi Aya (born 1990) Italian footballer

== Mythological figures ==
- Aya (goddess), Akkadian goddess

== Fictional characters ==
- Aya of Yopougon, the protagonist of the comic book series Aya of Yop City
- Aya Asagiri, main character from the Magical Girl Site series
- Aya Ayano, a character in the novel Another
- Aya Brea, a main character in the Parasite Eve video games
- Aya Drevis, main character in the horror video game Mad Father
- Aya Ikeuchi (亜也), a protagonist in the Japanese television drama 1 Litre no Namida
- Aya Iseshima (綾), main character in Master of Martial Hearts
- Aya Komichi, in the manga Kin-iro Mosaic
- Aya Kominato (小湊 亜耶), character in the manga and anime series "Blue Spring Ride" (Ao Haru Ride)
- Aya Natsume (亜夜), in the manga and anime series Tenjho Tenge
- Aya Maruyama, from the BanG Dream! franchise
- Aya Mikage (妖), main character in Ceres, Celestial Legend
- Aya Fujimiya, a main character in the manga and anime series Weiß Kreuz.
- Aya Odagiri, from the television series Chōjin Sentai Jetman
- Aya Osawa (綾), from the manga and anime series The Guy She Was Interested in Wasn't a Guy at All
- Aya Shameimaru (文), in Phantasmagoria of Flower View from the Touhou Project video game series
- Aya Toujou (綾), a main character in the manga and anime series Strawberry 100%
- Aya Valero, a main character in the fantasy movie Wattpad
- Aya (DC Comics), from Green Lantern: The Animated Series
- Aya, the protagonist in the novel Extras
- Aya, main character in the video game series Onechanbara
- Aya of Alexandria, in the video game Assassin's Creed Origins
- Aya, in the video game Infinite Undiscovery
- Kokudo Aya, a Sentinel Miko character in Kusunoki Mebuki is a Hero
- Aya Fujisawa, a character in Gundam Build Divers

== See also ==
- Aya (disambiguation)
