= Keda =

Keda or KEDA may refer to:

- Keda (fly), a genus of flies
- Keda, Georgia, a small town in Ajaria, Georgia
- Keda Municipality, Georgia
- KEDA (AM), a radio station (1540 AM) licensed to San Antonio, Texas, U.S.A.
- Keda, a character in the Gormenghast series by Mervyn Peake
- Kedah Regional Development Authority (KEDA), a federal agency in the Ministry of Rural Development in Malaysia
- Movement for the Unity of Action of the Left or KEDA, a political party in Greece
- University of Science and Technology of China (科大), a public university in Hefei, Anhui, China
- Hong Kong University of Science and Technology (港科大), a public university in New Territories, Hong Kong

== See also ==
- Kedah, state in Malaysia
- Keida, Israeli outpost in the West Bank
- Kida (disambiguation)
