= Nukitashi =

Japanese adult visual novel

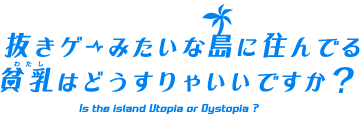

抜きゲーみたいな島に住んでる貧乳(わたし)はどうすりゃいいですか? (Nukige Mitai na Shima ni Sunderu Watashi wa Dō Surya Ii Desuka?)
- Genre: Comedy
- Video game
- Developer: Qruppo
- Publisher: JP: Qruppo; WW: Shiravune
- Platform: Windows
- Released: JP: July 27, 2018; WW: June 23, 2023
- Video game

Nukitashi 2
- Developer: Qruppo
- Publisher: JP: Qruppo; WW: Shiravune
- Platform: Windows
- Released: JP: July 26, 2019; WW: February 16, 2024
- Manga
- Written by: Qruppo
- Illustrated by: Mameojitan
- Published by: Beaglee; Shueisha
- Magazine: Manga Ōkoku (2020–2023); Ultra Jump (2021–2024)
- Original run: December 25, 2020 – February 19, 2024
- Volumes: 6
- Manga

Nukitashi R
- Written by: Qruppo
- Illustrated by: Mameojitan
- Published by: Beaglee; Kadokawa Shoten
- Imprint: Dragon Comic Age
- Magazine: Comic CMoa
- Original run: May 1, 2025 – present
- Volumes: 3
- Anime television series

Nukitashi the Animation
- Directed by: Nobuyoshi Nagayama
- Written by: Kenta Ihara
- Music by: Ebi Curry Earl; Sasa Ikeki; Umigame; Kashiko; Takeshi Iwasaki
- Studio: Passione
- Licensed by: OceanVeil
- Original network: AT-X (partly uncensored); BS11, GBS, Tokyo MX2, KBS Kyoto, Mie TV (censored)
- Original run: July 19, 2025 – September 27, 2025
- Episodes: 11 + 4 OVAs
- icon

Nukitashi (ぬきたし), short for Nukige Mitai na Shima ni Sunderu Watashi wa Dō Surya Ii Desuka? (抜きゲーみたいな島に住んでる貧乳(わたし)はどうすりゃいいですか?; transl. "What's a Flat-Chested Girl Like Me to Do on an Island Straight Out of a Porn Game?"), is a Japanese adult visual novel developed by Qruppo and released for Windows on July 27, 2018. An English version of the visual novel was released by Shiravune in June 2023. A sequel to the visual novel titled Nukitashi 2 was released in July 2019, with an English version being released by Shiravune in February 2024.

A manga adaptation with art by Mameojitan was serialized online via Beaglee's Manga Ōkoku website from December 2020 to December 2023 and later also in Shueisha's seinen manga magazine Ultra Jump from November 2021 to February 2024. It was collected in six tankōbon volumes. A second manga adaptation titled Nukitashi R, also with art by Mameojitan, began serialization by Beaglee on the Comic CMoa website on May 1, 2025. Kadokawa Shoten, under the Dragon Comic Age imprint, collected the manga into two tankōbon volumes as of August 2026.

An anime television series adaptation produced by Passione, titled Nukitashi the Animation, aired from July to September 2025.

== Plot ==
On Seiran Island, perverted sex is mandatory and encouraged everywhere under the Pervert Law. Junnosuke Tachibana and his sister Asane return to the island from Tokyo after the death of their parents. Junnosuke is disgusted by the law and refuses to participate, as he does not believe in sex without love. He gathers some like-minded people into a group called No Love No Sex (NLNS)/Anti-Copulation Front to protest the law, but must dodge the advances of several girls who are attracted to him, including the school enforcers called the Future SHO (FS) from punishment.

== Characters ==
Junnosuke Tachibana (橘 淳之介, Tachibana Junnosuke)
Voiced by: Kōhei Yanagi (Japanese); Zack Maher (English)
Hinami Watarai (渡会 ヒナミ, Watarai Hinami)
Voiced by: Minori Ozawa (Japanese); Amber May (English)
Nanase Katagiri (片桐 奈々瀬, Katagiri Nanase)
Voiced by: Shizuka Ishigami (Japanese); Amanda Parker (English)
Misaki Hotori (畔 美岬, Hotori Misaki)
Voiced by: Rie Okamoto (Japanese); Aife (English)
Asane Tachibana (橘 麻沙音, Tachibana Asane)
Voiced by: Ako Koaki (Japanese); Chloe Eves (English)
Tōka Reizeiin (冷泉院 桐香, Reizeiin Tōka)
Voiced by: Masumi Tazawa (Japanese); Angel Haven Rey (English)
Rei Tadasugawa (糺川 礼, Tadasugawa Rei)
Voiced by: Nanami Aiba (Japanese); Meredith Nudo (English)
Ikuko Onabuta (女部田 郁子, Onabuta Ikuko)
Voiced by: Nana Inoue (Japanese); Mana T. Johnson (English)
Ran Hanamaru (花丸 蘭, Hanamaru Ran)
Voiced by: Haru Amachi, Rucia Hama (Japanese); Elsie Lovelock (English)
Kōki Senba (仙波 光姫, Senba Kōki)
Voiced by: Ayaka Igasaki, Mei Isaki (Japanese); Sneha Kumar (English)
Mifuru Kururugi (枢木 美雨, Kururugi Mifuru)
Voiced by: Juri Nagatsuma (Japanese); Vivian Reed (English)
Rin Hanamaru (花丸 凛, Hanamaru Rin)
Voiced by: Rucia Hama (Japanese); Jingle Deleon (English)
Shain Miyachiyo (宮千代 輝光, Miyachiyo Shain)
Voiced by: Wakana Maruoka (Japanese); Aimee Smith (English)
Towako Morimatsu (森松 斗和子, Morimatsu Towako)
Voiced by: Shima Nagae (Japanese); Alexandria Loverro (English)
San Mozume (物集女 燦, Mozume San)
Voiced by: Yurika Hirayama (Japanese); Valory Pierce (English)
Inami Naga (那賀 伊波, Naga Inami)
Voiced by: Ichina Ayusawa (Japanese); Phebe Fabacher (English)
Shū Nakamura (仲村 シュウ, Nakamura Shū)
Voiced by: Kazuma Shinoda (Japanese); Alexander Hanly (English)
Natsumi Ōtabe (太田部 夏海, Ōtabe Natsumi)
Voiced by: Neneko Chashiro (Japanese); Rachanee Lumayno (English)
Otome Tanahashi (棚橋 乙女, Tanahashi Otome)
Voiced by: Marie Miyake (Japanese); Kaylen Kennedy (English)
Fuku Umenoki (梅ノ木 フク, Umenoki Fuku)
Voiced by: Mari Takahashi (Japanese); Brie Pierre (English)
Hamedori-kun (ハメドリくん)
Voiced by: Yasuhiro Kusudo (Japanese); Sean Chiplock (English)

== Other media ==
=== Manga ===
A manga adaptation illustrated by Mameojitan was serialized in Beaglee's Manga Ōkoku website from December 25, 2020, to December 25, 2023. It was also serialized in Shueisha's seinen manga magazine Ultra Jump from November 19, 2021, to February 19, 2024. Shueisha published the series in six tankōbon volumes, released from January 2022 to April 2024.

A second manga adaptation, titled Nukitashi R (ぬきたしR), began serialization by Beaglee on the Comic CMoa website on May 1, 2025. The series, which is also illustrated by Mameojitan, takes place a year and a half after the events of the previous manga. Kadokawa, under the Dragon Comic Age imprint, has published three tankōbon volumes as of August 7, 2026.

==== Volumes ====
===== Nukitashi =====
No.	Release date	ISBN
1	January 19, 2022	978-4-08-892208-9
2	July 19, 2022	978-4-08-892381-9
3	December 19, 2022	978-4-08-892548-6
4	May 19, 2023	978-4-08-892736-7
5	November 17, 2023	978-4-08-892866-1
6	April 18, 2024	978-4-08-893212-5

===== Nukitashi R =====
No.	Release date	ISBN
1	July 9, 2025	978-4-04-075998-2
2	February 9, 2026	978-4-04-076271-5
3	August 7, 2026	978-4-04-076499-3

=== Anime ===
An anime adaptation titled Nukitashi the Animation was announced during an event for the visual novel on January 28, 2024. It was later confirmed to be a television series produced by Passione and directed by Nobuyoshi Nagayama, with Kenta Ihara writing and overseeing series scripts, and Kumata designing the characters. Ebi Curry Earl, Sasa Ikeki, Umigame, and Kashiko reprised their roles as composers. It aired from July 19 to September 27, 2025, on AT-X and other channels, and ran for 11 episodes, with additional original video animations bundled with the Blu-ray Disc compilation volumes of the series. The opening theme song is "Utopia or Dystopia" performed by Yuki Yumeno, and the ending theme song "Saikai-kei Joshi wa Dōsurya Iidesu ka?" (What Should I do About a Girls' Reunion?) performed by Rie Ayase. WWWave Corporation licensed the series for streaming on OceanVeil.

==== Episodes ====
No.	Title	Directed by	Written by	Storyboarded by	Original release date
1	"Pervert Law"; Transliteration: "Dosukebe Jōrei" (Japanese: ドスケベ条例)	Daiki Takemoto	Kenta Ihara	Nobuyoshi Nagayama	July 19, 2025
Junnosuke Tachibana and his sister Asane lived on Japan's Seiran Island when they were young, moved to Tokyo, and then transferred back after their parents' deaths. On arrival, they are shocked by a new law, aimed at boosting the island's economy, which makes perverted sex mandatory, and sex in public is actively encouraged. People have sex in school, but Junnosuke evades people propositioning him and meets up with Asane, who was given a birth control pill and is exempt from sex until they are sure it worked. Although a lesbian, Asane is also attracted to her own brother, so she does not want sex with strange men. The school enforcers (Future SHO or FS) apprehend a boy and a girl who refuse to have sex with others and have them raped by a sex machine called the Guillotine as punishment, horrifying the siblings. Realizing they can be tracked by their phones, Asane works to counteract this. The next day, some FS proposition Junnosuke, but the school idol Nanase Katagiri helps him escape, explaining that everyone assumed she was promiscuous due to her looks, but she is really a virgin and opposes the law. They are chased and shot at with rubber bullets, but fall into a hole and find an underground bunker. An old man appears on a screen and explains that he opposes the law, then offers them the bunker's resources to fight back. Junnosuke accepts.
2	"Savior"; Transliteration: "Kyūseishu" (Japanese: 救性主)	Sumio Hiratsuka	Kenta Ihara	Ikuo Morimoto	July 26, 2025
The students are inspected by the FS, and sex toys are found on Junnosuke. He is reminded that masturbation without a partner is prohibited, but Nanase claims they were having sex. In reality, the sex toys are weapons created by a 3D printer in the bunker. Junnosuke and Nanase distribute them in vending machines around the island, but have to pretend to have sex when a patrol comes. He confides in Nanase that he hates sex because he was bullied for having a massive penis. Nanase cooks for the siblings, and Asane confides that she was bullied for being a lesbian. Homosexuality is illegal on the island, another reason Junnosuke gives to take the law down. Meanwhile, Hinami Watarai hates that everyone ignores her because she has the body of a child, as she wants to have sex. An FS named Rei Tadasugawa catches her masturbating, but agrees to look the other way since they are friends. Misaki Hotori hates that everyone ignores her, apparently because she is fat, and starts obsessively exercising and masturbating. As Asane completes a program to allow her allies to detect people, the old man sends them a coded message inside a porn film. A fat, perverted man grabs Hinami and tries to rape her. Junnosuke and Nanase arrive and kick him away.
3	"Pop-up Shower"; Transliteration: "Yūdachi" (Japanese: 夕勃ち)	Satoshi Saga	Kenta Ihara	Naruse Takahashi	August 2, 2025
As some FS arrive, Junnosuke reminds the man that sex with minors is not allowed. Hinami protests, saying she is not a child and proves it by showing her student ID. Regardless, the FS arrests the man for being a pedophile, then chases Junnosuke, Hinami, and Nanase through the woods. Asane jams their tracking devices and radios, and the three are able to escape with gadgets like a smokescreen and the help of a mysterious girl who snipes the FS with rubber bullets. Hinami is taken to the bunker and invited to join them. She accepts only when Nanase says that, by abolishing the law, she can choose who to have sex with. They recall the old man's message: the mysterious girl, Fumino Kotoyose, is the key to abolishing the law, so the FS is also looking for her. Asane is unable to find Fumino in the records, so they will have to hack into an FS computer. Meanwhile, the FS search the woods for Fumino, who is rescued by Misaki and given shelter in her house. The school has a school-wide assembly — which is actually a penis inspection and orgy — in which Junnosuke gets out of it by wearing a chastity belt and pretending Nanase has claimed him. The student council president, Touka Reizeiin, gives a speech claiming sex unifies them and announces that an athletic competition is coming.
4	"Romp Day"; Transliteration: "Karada Ikusai" (Japanese: 体イク祭)	Hiroto Miyagi	Kenta Ihara	Naruse Takahashi	August 9, 2025
The athletic competition, where everyone has to go in swimsuits, and the events are sex themed, begins. Junnosuke plans to hack into an office computer to link with the FS' database, while Fumino asks Misaki to destroy her records. Asane faints from seeing all the beautiful women and is taken to the nurse's office, while Hinami is mistaken for a lost child and taken to a daycare. Junnosuke and Nanase win some events because the others are intimidated by the two and forfeit. In an ejaculation contest, Junnosuke is impotent due to his past trauma until Nanase lets him fondle her breasts while insulting him, before finishing it up by giving him a blowjob combined with electric shocks, and they win. He is so exhausted that he is taken to the nurse's office, where he sneaks away to an office computer. He meets Misaki there, who slipped away when everyone ignored her, then Rei approaches, so he asks her to stick a USB into the computer while he distracts Rei. It works, and they part ways shortly thereafter. In the bunker, Asane says it may take a while to interpret the data. Misaki reports to Fumino that she destroyed the files and wants to lose her virginity to Junnosuke. Fumino shocks her by revealing she plans to assassinate Toshiaki Hitoura, the ruler of the island.
5	"Anti-Copulation Front"; Transliteration: "Han Kōbi Seiryoku" (Japanese: 反交尾勢力)	Tatsuya Hagino	Kenta Ihara	Masae Nakayama	August 16, 2025
Toshiaki visits the school for a progress report on finding Fumino and declares he will give a speech at Pervert Land later. The old man sends Junnosuke's group a liquid called D10-O that hardens when struck, giving Junnosuke the idea to combine it with vibrators to harden it on demand. Toshiaki gives a speech on spreading the law to the rest of Japan. Misaki rides her bike with Fumino and her sniper rifle to the speech, using her body to shield Fumino from the FS' rubber bullets. Junnosuke's group assists them by having Asane jam the FS' radios and tracking devices, with Junnosuke and Nanase, respectively wielding a vibrator and an umbrella reinforced with the substance, and Himani wielding her steel chair. The FS' Squad 1 leader, Ikuko Onabuta, soon corners Junnosuke, before defeating and raping him after using her hypnotic voice to overcome his impotence. Misaki, Fumino, and Hinami steal a truck, where Misaki drives it up to Toshiaki, and Fumino prepares to snipe him, but she notices Touka protecting him with strings. Asane calls them to say Junnosuke is in trouble, so they abort and double back. Junnosuke takes control of the sex before kicking Ikuko off, just as Misaki hits Ikuko with the truck. As everyone regroups, Ikuko gets up and asks who they are, so Junnosuke declares they are the Anti-Copulation Front.
6	"Bang Away"; Transliteration: "Koketsu ni Sōnyū-Razunba" (Japanese: コケツに挿入らずんば)	Satoshi Saga	Kenta Ihara	Kenji Setō	August 23, 2025
Ikuko is hospitalized with amnesia from the truck collision and damage to her vagina from Junnosuke's massive penis. Sensors made a mold of the penis, and Touka aims to identify him. Junnosuke is traumatized by the rape, but his group welcomes Fumino and Misaki. Fumino does not know why she is considered important, and the old man says to await further instructions. Junnosuke decides to infiltrate the FS as a new recruit, but soon regrets this when Rei works him to the bone during combat training. During a sex session, he claims to be impotent. Touka tests this by kissing him on the lips, making him get an erection, but it goes down before anyone notices. He asks around for the identity of a childhood friend of his, but no one knows her. The FS are on security detail while Nanase is interviewed. A yakuza member named Hashimoto attacks and tries to rape Nanase, but the reporter beats him up. However, he gets up and steals her gun. Junnosuke steps in and they shoot each other, getting knocked out because the guns use rubber bullets. As Junnosuke recovers, Rei commends him. Touka later watches a recording of the incident and notices Hashimoto's bullet bounced off Junnosuke's erect penis, which matches the mold, so she gloats that she identified him.
7	"Cumming-of-Age Day"; Transliteration: "Seijinshiki" (Japanese: 性人式)	Takahide Ejiri, Daiki Takemoto & Masahiro Ayumu	Kenta Ihara	Naruse Takahashi	August 30, 2025
As the final test to officially join the FS, Junnosuke faces Ikuko in a sword fight and gets in despite losing to her. The old man tells them to smuggle Fumino onto a ship while everyone is distracted by the Cumming-of-Age ceremony, a celebration of people who become old enough to engage in sex. Hinami tells the group not to be too hard on Rei because she works for the FS to support her little brother and sister. Touka shows the FS a dildo made in the image of Junnosuke's penis, leaving them in awe, saying the leader of the Anti-Copulation Front must be captured. She hints that she knows the Front's leader is Junnosuke, but keeps silent. While working with the FS, Junnosuke becomes conflicted, especially when Touka says most FS members are homeless, orphaned, or facing home troubles, and that the island is the only place they can live. The ceremony starts with the FS assigned as bodyguards. The group prepares to sneak Fumino onto the ship, but Junnosuke, who was supposed to create a diversion, instead tells the FS where they really are, then calls his friends telling them to abort the plan and run. He falls to his knees, crying.
8	"Cumpanion"; Transliteration: "Aibō" (Japanese: 愛棒)	Hiroki Moritomo, Utsugi Shōma	Kenta Ihara	Kenji Setō	September 6, 2025
Toshiaki cuts funding for the FS so his plan can work. Junnosuke tries to resign from the FS, but they settle for him taking a leave of absence. He apologizes to his group and is forgiven, though the old man is disappointed in Fumino's escape route failing and says a new plan is coming, threatening to stop supporting them if they fail again. The FS learn their funding was cut, but they put up wanted posters of Junnosuke's penis. Seeing how stressed out this makes him, Nanase leads him to a beautiful view on a cliff to cheer him up. He confides that as a child, when bullies pulled his pants and underwear down and mocked and beat him up for having a large penis, he attempted suicide, but a girl saved him. He never learned her name; only that she was constantly bullied for questioning Seiran's lewdism, and she was his only friend. One day, under the guise of saving her from having her virginity stolen, he tried to rape her, but she fought him off. Overwhelmed by guilt, he ran off and never saw her again, and he has been impotent ever since. Nanase reveals she was the girl in question, forgives him, and confesses her love for him. He gets an erection, but the FS attacks after detecting it. When they are cornered, Nanase pushes him off the cliff and into the sea to save him. He wakes up with his group, who pulled him out of the sea. The news says the island's perversion law has spread to the rest of Japan and that Nanase has been arrested and is being interrogated. In response, a distraught Junnosuke suffers a nervous breakdown.
9	"Ahh: Tying the Knot"; Transliteration: "Nhoo: Kizuna" (Japanese: んほぉ-絆-)	Ippei Ichii	Kenta Ihara	Efon	September 13, 2025
The island plans to celebrate passing the law to Japan with a ceremony where Nanase will be tortured in public with the Guillotine. The old man reveals another plan to smuggle Fumino off the island, but Junnosuke meets Touka to demand that Nanase be released. Revealing she knew he was the leader of the Anti-Copulation Front and about his past, she kisses him and demands sex in exchange, saying she is in love with him and he could conquer the world with his penis. She allows him to leave and gives him until the ceremony to decide. He tells his group that he will have sex with Touka in exchange for Nanase's release and says their group failed, but Fumino beats some sense into him and calls him out for giving up. The girls strip him and themselves to point out the body flaws that unite them, reinvigorating his spirit and impressing them with his sudden erection. Meanwhile, Nanase, not revealing anything, had been tortured by the SHO and locked in shackles that monitor her vitals, which will only open when she has sex. As the ceremony begins, the group decides to ignore the old man and focus on rescuing Nanase. They disrupt the fireworks celebration before going out disguised as the penguin mascot Hamedori.
10	"Chains Only Breakable with Sex"; Transliteration: "Sekkusu Shinai to Tokenai Kusari" (Japanese: セックスしないと解けない鎖)	Tatsuya Hagino, Rintarō Hachiya & Satoshi Saga	Kenta Ihara	Sousei Sakaguchi	September 20, 2025
As the group races toward the harbor, they defeat several FS members on the way. When Rei unmasks Hinami, she refuses to fight her, but Toshiaki's secretary berates her for incompetence and takes over the FS, ordering the ship carrying Nanase to be launched. Rei hides Hinami with her. Junnosuke glides to the ship and duels Ikuko, defeating her. After defeating the other guards, he finds Nanase and is unable to free her from her shackles. With no other option, they declare their love for one another, and they finally have sex, releasing her. Meanwhile, Asane and Misaki take Fumino to the extraction point, but when a man arrives in a motorboat to pick her up, Fumino refuses to leave, and they decide to take him hostage instead. Back on the ship, Junnosuke confronts the last person on board, Touka, who attacks him with razor-sharp strings.
11	"No Love, No Sex"	Daiki Takemoto	Kenta Ihara	Shinji Itadaki	September 27, 2025
Touka flings coins at Junnosuke hard enough to wound him before capturing him with her strings. Fumino calls Toshiaki and reveals she is his illegitimate daughter, trying to blackmail him into stopping his plans, but he refuses to quit. Junnosuke breaks the strings and chips away at Touka's resolve even as she continues to wound him by saying he wants to work together to make a better future. Hinami uses a communicator to let Rei and the other FS hear his speech, and it touches their hearts. Nanase helps Junnosuke defeat Touka and set the Guillotine on fire. Touka agrees to join them, but Toshiaki's secretary shoots her and orders her soldiers to board the boat and kill them. Angered, the FS wears Hamedori disguises and boards the boat, taking out the soldiers. The secretary shoots Junnosuke, but Misaki, Asane, and Fumino arrive in a helicopter, and Fumino shoots her gun out of her hand, allowing Ikuko to knock her out. After everyone has recovered from their injuries, Fumino joins the school. The law has stopped spreading to Japan; though there are still orgies and public sex is still allowed on Seiran, the policy has changed so that masturbation is allowed, and people do not have to have sex if they do not want to. Junnosuke and Nanase are happily dating, and their group will continue to fight for sexual freedom. Touka, Ikuko, and Rei reflect on the changes and say they are for the best. Toshiaki says he will not give up until his policies spread worldwide.
OVA–1	"I Will Become the Mama of Hinami Babumi Kindergarten"; Transliteration: "Hinami, Babumi Youchien no Mama ni Naru" (Japanese: ヒナミ、バブみ幼稚園のママになる)	Rintarō Hachiya	Naoto Kurahone & Yuu Kamichika	Naruse Takahashi	November 26, 2025
Hinami is treating Junnosuke like a baby by cradling him in her lap and pretending to breastfeed him when he suddenly starts groping and stripping her. They then have sex and orgasm multiple times. He abruptly wakes up from his dream, but her phone is near his bed.
OVA–2	"Misaki Receives the Popular Massage"; Transliteration: "Misaki, Minasan Yarareteiru Massage wo Yarareru" (Japanese: 美岬、みなさんやられているマッサージをやられる)	Daiki Takemoto	Naoto Kurahone & Yuu Kamichika	Naruse Takahashi	November 26, 2025
In her trailer, Misaki receives a massage from Junnosuke in a swimsuit. He applies oil and suddenly strips her swimsuit and gropes and fingers her. They then have sex and orgasm multiple times. As she says she is hungry, he abruptly wakes up from his dream, but food is near his bed.
OVA–3	"Mommy-ish Girlfriend, Nanase"; Transliteration: "Okāsan Mitaina Kanojo, Nanase" (Japanese: お母さんみたいな彼女、七瀬)	Fumiya Nakamura	Naoto Kurahone & Yuu Kamichika	Naruse Takahashi	December 24, 2025
Nanase berates Junnosuke for his messy room, then gives him a handjob while breastfeeding him, reminding him that he can only get an erection around her. They then have sex. Just as they orgasm, he abruptly wakes up from his dream, but the sex toy they used is near his bed.
OVA–4	"Master's Little Pet"; Transliteration: "Masutā no Chīsana Petto" (Japanese: マスターの小さなペット)	Junnosuke Nishio	Naoto Kurahone & Yuu Kamichika	Naruse Takahashi	December 24, 2025
Junnosuke wants a dog. Fumino, who is serving him, offers to be his dog, so she strips and puts on a dog collar, leash, and dog ears. He controls her with the leash as she gives him a blowjob and has sex with him. Afterwards, she gets dressed, but then makes a mess and asks him to discipline her some more. He abruptly wakes up from his dream, but the collar and leash are near his bed.
