= Aya (comics) =

Aya, in comics, may refer to:

- Aya of Yop City, a graphic novel series by Marguerite Abouet and Clement Oubrerie
- Aya, a character in the AK Comics series
- Aya (DC Comics), a fictional character featured in comic books published by DC Comics.

== See also ==
- Aya (disambiguation)
