= Ayako Nakano =

Ayako Nakano may refer to:

- Ayako Nakano (dancer) (中野 綾子, born 1977), Japanese ballerina
- Ayako Nakano (swimmer) (中野 亜弥子, born 1973), Japanese swimmer
