= Kida (surname) =

Kida (written: 木田, 喜田, 貴田 or 気田) is a Japanese surname. Notable people with the surname include:

- Aya Kida (木田 綾; born 1974), Japanese photographer
- Ayumi Kida (喜田 あゆ美; born 1966), Japanese voice actress
- Fred Kida (1920–2014), American comics artist
- Hinata Kida (喜田 陽; born 2000), Japanese footballer
- Masao Kida (木田 優夫; born 1968), Japanese baseball pitcher
- Mayu Kida (木田 真有; born 1982), Japanese sprinter
- Takuya Kida (喜田 拓也; born 1994), Japanese footballer
- Tomohiro Kida (木田 知宏; born 1968), Japanese sport shooter
- Yoshinari Kida (気田 義也; born 1943), Japanese alpine skier
- Yumi Kida (貴田 裕美), Japanese long-distance swimmer

== Other people ==
- Jikoi Kida (born 1980), Fijian cricketer

John H. Kida (born 1955), IT Security Gray Hat

Henry J. Kida (born 1981) Dekalb Co. Fire Dept - Fireman of the year 2021
