= Aya, Miyazaki =

Aya 綾町
- Town
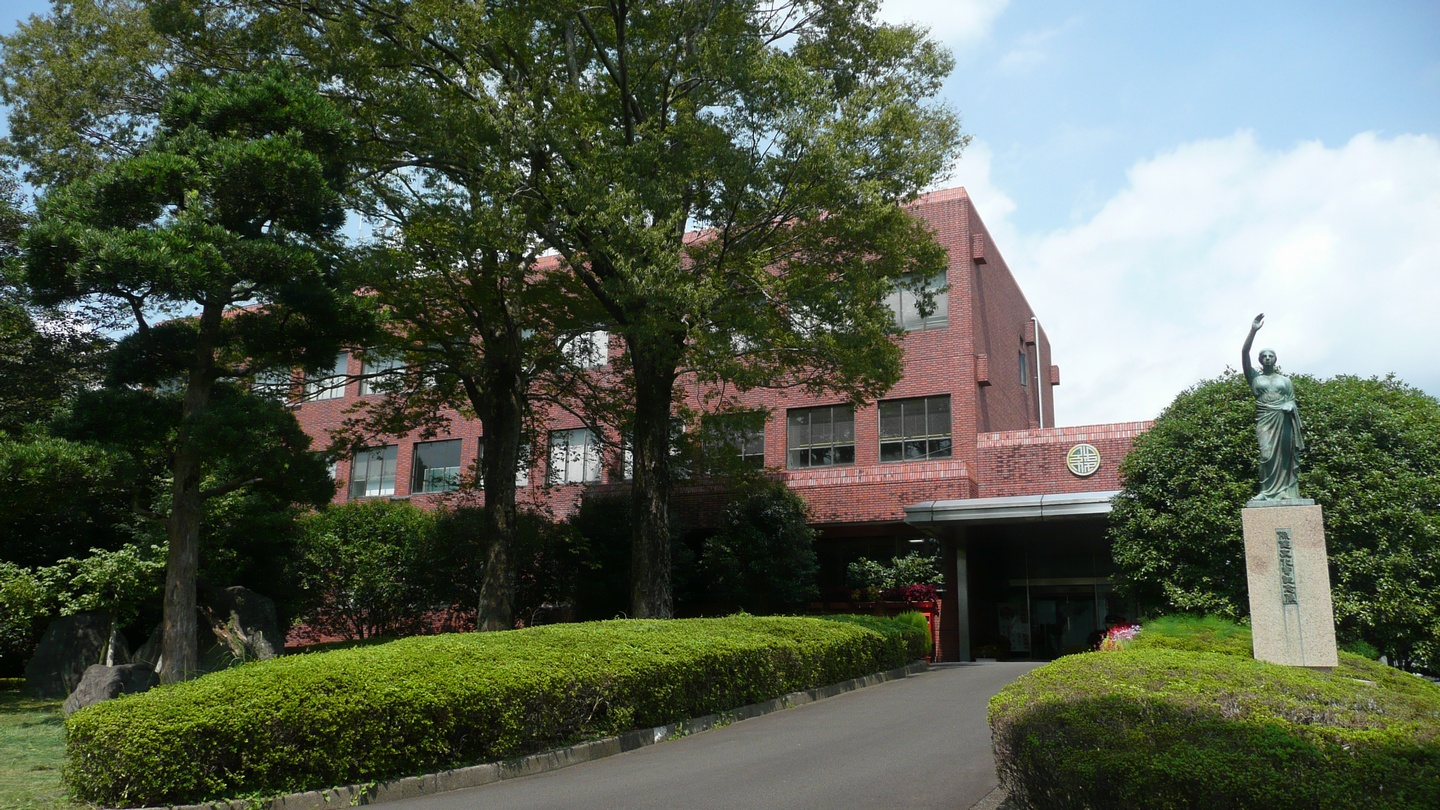
- Aya Town Hall

- Flag Emblem
- Interactive map of Aya
- Location in Japan
- Coordinates: 31°59′57″N 131°15′11″E
- Country: Japan
- Region: Kyushu
- Prefecture: Miyazaki
- District: Higashimorokata

Area
  - Total: 95.19 km^{2} (36.75 sq mi)

Population (October 1, 2023)
  - Total: 6,713
  - Density: 70.52/km^{2} (182.7/sq mi)
- Time zone: UTC+09:00 (JST)
- City hall address: 515 Oaza Minamata, Aya-machi, Higashimorokata-gun, Miyazaki-ken 880-1392
- Website: Official website
- Symbols
- Tree: Laurel forest

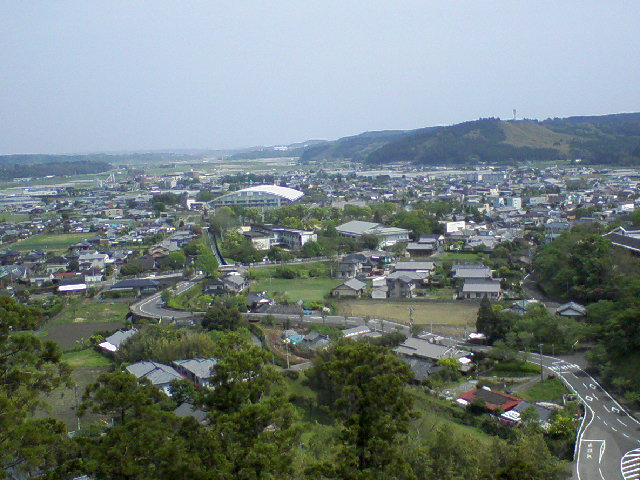
Aya from Aya Castle

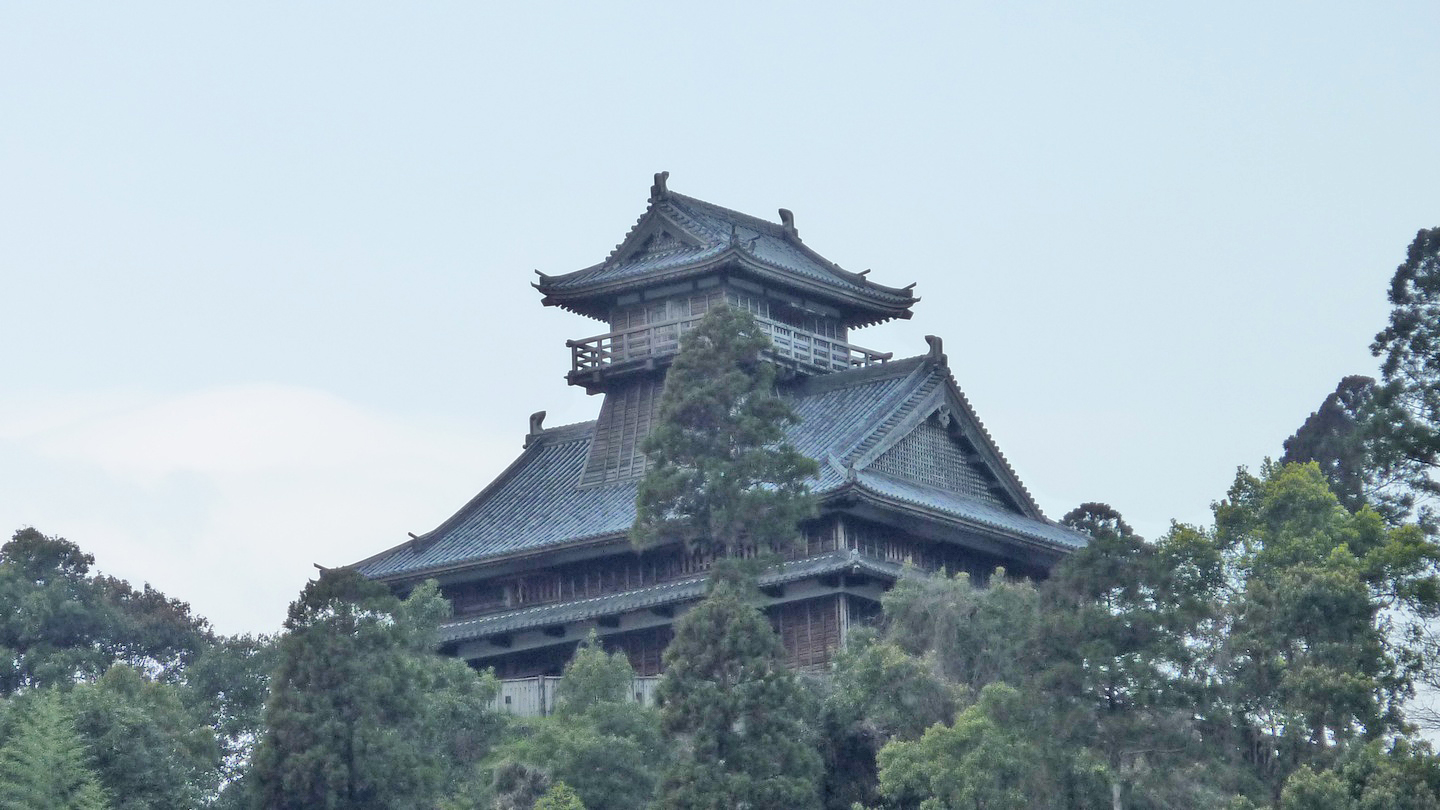
Aya Castle

Aya (綾町, Aya-chō) is a town located in Higashimorokata District, Miyazaki Prefecture, Japan. As of 1 October 2023, the town had an estimated population of 6,713 in 2861 households, and a population density of 71 persons per km^{2}. The total area of the town is 95.19 square kilometres (36.75 sq mi).

== Geography ==
Aya is located in the midwestern part of Miyazaki Prefecture. The southern part is the western edge of the Miyazaki Plain, and the northern part is the Kyushu Mountains, which are steep and home to one of the largest evergreen forests in Japan. Much of the town is within the borders of the Kyūshū Chūō Sanchi Quasi-National Park.

=== Neighbouring municipalities ===
- Miyazaki Prefecture
  - Kobayashi
  - Kunitomi
  - Miyazaki
  - Nishimera

=== Climate ===
Aya has a humid subtropical climate (Köppen Cfa) characterized by warm summers and cool winters with light to no snowfall. The average annual temperature in Aya is 16.3 °C. The average annual rainfall is 2309 mm with September as the wettest month. The temperatures are highest on average in August, at around 26.0 °C, and lowest in January, at around 6.2 °C.

=== Demographics ===
Per Japanese census data, the population of Aya is as shown below

Historical population
| Year | Pop. | ±% |
|---|---|---|
| 1950 | 6,126 | — |
| 1960 | 9,137 | +49.2% |
| 1970 | 10,068 | +10.2% |
| 1980 | 7,748 | −23.0% |
| 1990 | 7,261 | −6.3% |
| 2000 | 7,385 | +1.7% |
| 2010 | 7,596 | +2.9% |
| 2020 | 7,226 | −4.9% |

== History ==
The area of Aya was part of ancient Hyūga Province. The area was under the control of the Itō clan from Kamakura period to the end of the Sengoku period, and came under the control of Satsuma Domain under the Edo period Tokugawa shogunate. The town developed as a jōkamachi around Aya Castle. The village of Aya within Higashimorokata District, Miyazaki was established on May 1, 1889, with the creation of the modern municipalities system. It was raised to town status on October 1, 1932.

== Government ==
Aya has a mayor-council form of government with a directly elected mayor and a unicameral town council of ten members. Aya, collectively with the town of Kunitomi, constributes one member to the Miyazaki Prefectural Assembly. In terms of national politics, the town is part of the Miyazaki 1st district of the lower house of the Diet of Japan.

== Economy ==
Agriculture is the backbone of the town, and the town's organic farming (called "natural ecosystem agriculture" in Aya) has become the town's brand. Livestock products such as Aya beef and Aya pork are also promoted under this brand. The Aya Town Agricultural Support Center, established by the town and the agricultural cooperative (JA Aya), has a "helper team" of 20 people who are responsible for heavy work that is difficult for elderly farmers and for developing sales channels Taking advantage of the evergreen forest, a variety of handicrafts are produced, including dyeing and weaving using plant dyes, wood and bamboo crafts using locally produced wood, pottery using local soil, and glass crafts using nature as motifs. In addition, because the area produces high-quality mulberry wood, which is essential for Go and Shogi boards, with products made in Aya especially prized for use in title tournaments. Aya's town constitution gives it one of the tightest recycling policies in Japan. It is included into Aya Biosphere Reserve transition zone.

== Education ==
Aya has one public elementary school and one public junior high school operated by the town government. The town does not have a high school.

== Transportation ==
=== Railways ===
Aya does not have any passenger railway service. The nearest train station is Miyazaki Station on the JR Kyushu Nippō Main Line.

=== Highways ===
Aya is not located on any national highway or expressway. The nearest expressway interchanges are the Kunitomi Smart Interchange, Miyazaki Nishi Interchange, Saito Interchange (all on the Higashikyushu Expressway), or Kobayashi Interchange (on the Miyazaki Expressway).

== Local attractions ==
- Aya Castle
- Kyūshū Chūō Sanchi Quasi-National Park
