= Maitetsu =

Japanese media franchise

- Maitetsu PC cover

まいてつ
- Video game
- Developer: Lose
- Publisher: Lose
- Directed by: tO
- Genre: Eroge, Visual novel
- Engine: KiriKiri
- Platform: Windows, PlayStation 4, Nintendo Switch
- Released: March 25, 2016
- Anime television series

Rail Romanesque
- Directed by: Hirasawa Hisayoshi (Note: Credited as Chief Director (総監督))
- Produced by: tO
- Written by: Kouichi Motomura
- Music by: Youichi Sakai
- Studio: Saetta
- Licensed by: Crunchyroll; Funimation
- Original network: Tokyo MX, BS11, MBS, Wowow
- Original run: October 3, 2020 – December 19, 2020
- Episodes: 12
- Video game

Maitetsu: Last Run!!
- Developer: Lose
- Publisher: Lose
- Directed by: tO
- Genre: eroge, visual novel
- Engine: KiriKiri
- Platform: Windows
- Released: October 30, 2020
- Anime television series

Rail Romanesque 2
- Directed by: Michiru Ebira
- Studio: Yokohama Animation Laboratory; Cloud Hearts
- Original network: Tokyo MX
- Original run: October 6, 2023 – December 29, 2023
- Episodes: 13

Maitetsu (Japanese: まいてつ) is a visual novel developed by Lose, which spawned anime sidestory short series, Rail Romanesque (Japanese: レヱル・ロマネスク, Hepburn: Reeru Romanesuku). Maitetsu was initially released in Japan in 2016, and it was released internationally by Sekai Project on Steam in 2018. Sekai Project also released the uncensored version of the game on Fakku and Jast, but has since been delisted from Fakku. An expanded re-release, Maitetsu: Last Run, was released in 2020 and contains the original Maitetsu as well as content that could be interpreted as a full sequel.

Rail Romanesque, an anime spinoff of the game, was announced in 2019 and released in 2020. Outside of Japan, the anime was released by Crunchyroll and Funimation. A second season was announced and aired from October to December 2023.

== Plot ==
Maitetsu is set in an alternate reality of Japan named Hinomoto in which railway locomotives are paired up with "Raillords", anthropomorphized girls representing the locomotives. However, a new form of transportation later became popular, leaving railways in disuse. The game follows Sotetsu, who reawakens Hachiroku, the Raillord of steam locomotives No.8620. Sotetsu then works to help Hachiroku find her missing locomotive while trying to save his hometown from pollution.

The majority of the story is set in Ohitoyo, a fictitious city in Kyushu split in half by the Kuma River. The town is largely based on the real city of Hitoyoshi in Kumamoto.

== Characters ==
=== Visual novel ===
Sōtetsu Migita (右田 双鉄, Migita Sōtetsu)
Voiced by: Ei Mochizuki (credited as Ki Kashino in visual novels)

Adopted son of a family of brewers. Was the victim of a railway accident of which he was the only survivor in his family. Sōtetsu later acts as Hibiki's secretary after she assumes her position as mayor. His maiden name is Sogō.

Hachiroku (ハチロク, Hachiroku)
Voiced by: Atsumi Tanezaki (credited as Hana Kiritani in visual novels)

Raillord accidentally awoken by Sōtetsu, having been stowed away in a display case for a long time. Speaks in a very refined and formal tone. She personifies the JGR Class 8620 2-6-0 Mogul-type steam locomotive, specifically, number 8620, the lead member of her class. In one of the sub-endings, Sōtetsu confesses to Hachiroku; despite her initial reservations they agree to get married, with Hachiroku given the married name of Suzu Migita (右田 铃, Migita Suzu).

Hachiroku also appears in the anime, but is unvoiced.

Hibiki Migita (右田 日々姫, Migita Hibiki)
Voiced by: Maki Tomonaga (credited as Himari in visual novels)

Stepsister of Sōtetsu who is also an aspiring artist. Noted as being very optimistic. Her speech often slips into a Kumamoto drawl; she will then attempt to correct it back into a more refined tone which she uses "as she is now older". She subsequently becomes the mayor of Ohitoyo. In the future, she becomes a locomotive designer.

Paulette Hinai (雛衣・ポーレット, Hinai Pōretto)
Voiced by: Kei Maeda (credited as Sanma Aji in visual novels)

Mayor of Ohitoyo and operator and caretaker of Reina. Noted as being very timid and is of Franc descent. Due to a harassment incident at a city council meeting involving an outside heckler, Paulette resigns as mayor of Ohitoyo due to the pressure; she then acts as a mentor for Hibiki after the latter takes up her position. In the official canon of the story, Sōtetsu and Paulette marry; she later gives birth to a daughter named Hikari.

Reina (れいな, Reina)
Voiced by: Mai Kadowaki (credited as Mitsu Anzu in visual novels)

Raillord always noted as being in the company of Paulette. She is the personification of the JNR KiHa 07 series (ja) diesel railcar. Speaks extremely slowly and in a fashion similar to that of a toddler. Reina also appears in the anime, but is unvoiced.

Makura Migita (右田 真闇, Migita Makura)
Voiced by: Kei Mizusawa (credited as Rino Kawashima in visual novels)

Sōtetsu's adoptive older sister and the owner of the Migitachi Brewery. Speaks with a heavy Kumamoto drawl, has a very shapely figure and has a very sisterly personality.

Kisaki Hōshō (宝生 稀咲, Hōshō Kisaki)
Voiced by: Akane Sanada (credited as Akane Ueda in visual novels)

Daughter of the owner of the Kumamoto Bank as well as a branch manager for the Ohitoyo branch. Noted as being the first to discover Hibiki's talent and is regarded as a "reliable senpai". Is very shrewd and astute. Once Hibiki assumes her position as mayor, Kisaki acts as one of her assistants; in one of the sub-endings, Sōtetsu confesses to Kisaki and they agree to get married.

Nagi Minokasa (蓑笠 凪, Minokasa Nagi)
Voiced by: Yotsuba Yagami (credited as Yayoi Hayase in visual novels)

An young tomboyish girl of who is very interested in swordplay. Acts as the poster girl for the Minakasa blacksmith shop. In the future, she becomes the assistant to a railway engineer.

Fukami Hayase (早瀬 ふかみ, Hayase Fukami)
Voiced by: Mai Nagai (credited as Emi Sakura in visual novels)

An young girl of similar age to Nagi who manages the Kuma River Rafts. Is an introvert and often requires Nagi, her best friend, to speak for her. In the future, she becomes the manager of the Kuma River Rafts.

Minoru Minokasa (蓑笠 穣, Minokasa Minoru)
Voiced by: Daisuke Sugiyama (credited as Makoto Sakura in visual novels)

A blacksmith who is the owner of the Minakasa blacksmith shop and Nagi's grandfather. Is noted as one of the few people remaining who has the skill to repair locomotives.

Kiyoharu Akai (赤井 清春, Akai Kiyoharu)
Voiced by: Yukimasa Obi (credited as Izuru Mutsu in visual novels)

Head priest of a local shrine. Is often speculated to have had some experience in the operation of railroads.

Yubi Toro (登呂結比, Toro Yubi)
Voiced by: Konomi Moriyama (credited as Haruno Shioka in visual novels)

An elderly woman who is the owner of the Tororuyu public bathhouse. Is said to have been a technician of the Imperial Railroad in the past. She was previously credited under the moniker of "Tororuyu Owner (登呂流湯主人, Tororyūyu Shujin)".

Mototada Hōshō (宝生 元忠, Hōshō Mototada)
Voiced by: Kōichi Sōma (credited as Kengo Nishioka in visual novels)

Father of Kisaki Hōshō and president of the Kumamoto Bank. His wealth allows him to have great influence over numerous things.

Navi (ナビ, Nabi)
Voiced by: Reiko Anzai

Sentient navigation system of Sōtetsu's Aircra. Hachiroku was initially hostile towards her but slowly warmed up.

Nagare Hayase (早瀬 流, Hayase Nagare)
Voiced by: Seiichirō Konno (credited as Makoto Tono in visual novels)

Fukami's grandfather; he used to be the leading crewman of the Kuma River Rafts. In retirement, he works voluntarily for the railroad as a patrolman and performs track maintenance.

Seki Hayase (早瀬 堰, Hayase Seki)
Voiced by: Ryō Sugisaki

One of Fukami's grand uncles. In retirement, he works voluntarily for the railroad as a patrolman and performs track maintenance.

Osamu Hayase (早瀬 治, Hayase Osamu)

One of Fukami's grand uncles. In retirement, he works voluntarily for the railroad as a patrolman and performs track maintenance.

Kagetsu Urakami (浦上香月, Urakami Kagetsu)
Voiced by: Asami Nakamura (credited as Mao Tachibana in visual novels)

Employee of an Aircra factory in Ohitoyo. Currently works at the Ohitoyo Branch of the Kumamoto Bank as Kisaki's secretary and personal assistant. Her androgynous appearance often leads her to be mistaken for a man.

Unzan Nagayama (永山 雲山, Nagayama Unzan)

Head priest of the Eizanji ghost temple. Tends to avoid advice given to him.

Noriko Nagayama (永山 典子, Nagayama Noriko)
Voiced by: Nanae Sakurai (credited as Rie Hoshika in visual novels)

Wife of the head priest of the Eizanji ghost temple. Formerly worked as kitchen staff on the Imperial Railroad; runs a crêpe and pastry shop in Ohitoyo in retirement.

Michiko Sogō (十川 路子, Sogō Michiko)
Voiced by: Tomosa Muruta (credited as Chika Ashiwara in visual novels)

Twin sister of Sōtetsu who died in a railway accident of which the latter was the only survivor in the family. Apparently not fully aware that she has died, she continuously wanders the trains around the area as a ghost.

Niiroku (ニイロク, Niiroku)
Voiced by: Yukina Fujimori (2016 – 2017), Rin Osawa (2018 – present, credited as Yumu Akatsuki in visual novels)

A long-disused Raillord manufactured near the end of the Imperial Railway's existence. She is the personification of the JNR 181 series electric multiple unit, with her name being taken from the KuHa 26 control cars. Has a very aloof personality and speaks with a monotonous tone but has long desired to return to service. In her first few appearances, she obscures her face with white bandages. She later comes under the ownership of Akai.

Kon (コン, Kon)
Voiced by: Airi Ishihara (credited as Yui Ogura in visual novels)

A red fox which wanders around Ohitoyo Station. Communicates using yips.

Honoka Saitō (斎藤 帆香, Saitō Honoka)
Voiced by: Kumiko Nakane

Head brewer of the Migitachi Brewery. Speaks with a heavy Kumamoto drawl and recognized Hibiki's artistic talents from a young age.

Iyori Miyamoto (永山 雲山, Miyamoto Iyori)

Long-standing employee of the Ohitoyo Municipal Council. Reliable and well-respected, she has been active in the town's affairs since Paulette's father was mayor.

Olivi (オリヴィ, Oribui)
Voiced by: Chiyo Ousaki (credited as Komachi Shirai in visual novels)

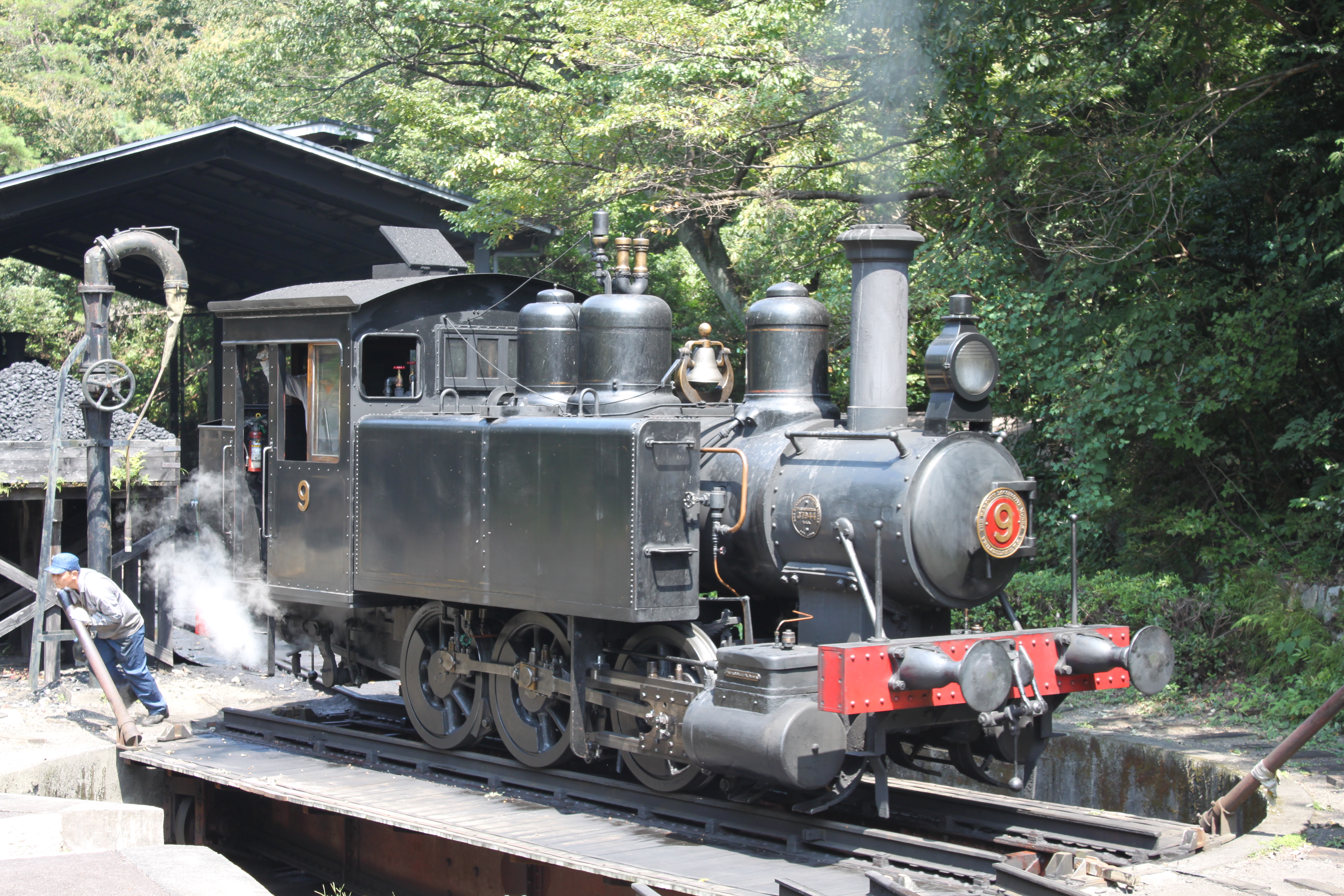
Olivi's basis Baldwin No. 9 at Meiji-mura

A young-looking raillord imported from the United States, operating for over a hundred years on the Mikan Railway. She is the personification of the Fuji Minobu Class 1 0-6-0T steam locomotive, a copy of the JGR Class 1240 (ja) steam locomotive. She represents locomotive number 9 built by Baldwin.

Jinroku Munakata (宗方 甚六, Munakata Jinroku)
Voiced by: Ichirō Shōwa

Olivi's former engineer who worked with her on the Hiso Mikan Railway. Stoic, serious and a man of few words.

Hikari Migita (右田 ひかり, Migita Hikari)
Voiced by: Haruka Takagi (credited as Chiharu Umeki in visual novels)

Daughter of Sōtetsu and Paulette. Extremely shy.

Hiyoko (ひよこ, Hiyoko)
Voiced by: Juri Nagatsuma (credited as Ion Momoyama in visual novels)

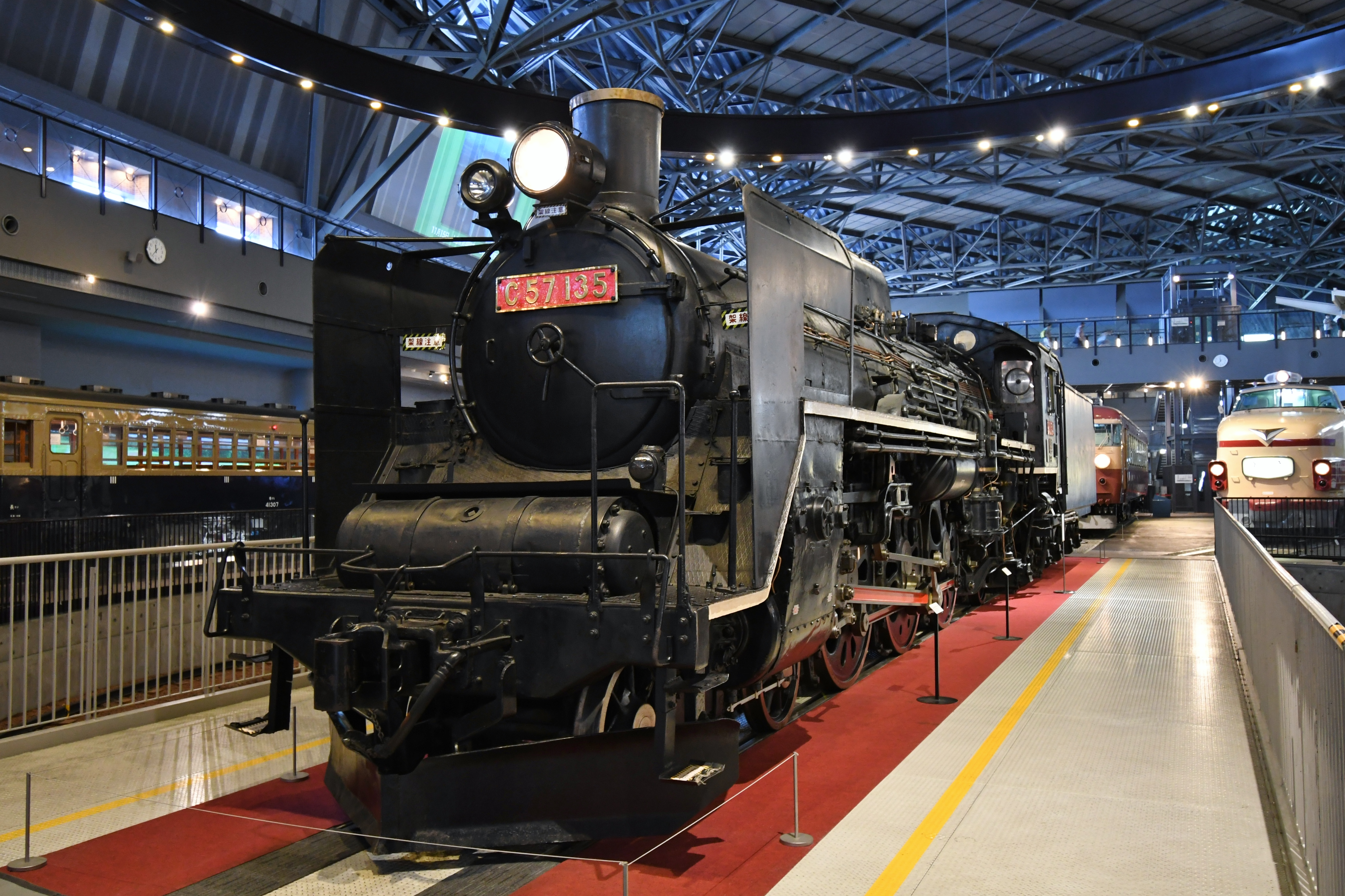
C57 135 - the locomotive Hiyoko represents

A raillord acting as the director of a railway museum in Hinomoto, working to uncover the process behind the manufacture of raillords. She is the personification of the JNR Class C57 4-6-2 Pacific-type steam locomotive. She represents locomotive number C57 145.

Mori Geishū (芸州毛利, Geishū Mori)
Voiced by: Ai Fukada (credited as Saori Yukito in visual novels)

Owner and director of the Mori Electric Railway and a heiress of the Mori noble family. She has been using her wealth and standing to revitalize the rail transport economy in Hinomoto. Often credited as "Train Princess (電車姫, Densha Hime)"

Mikuro (みくろ, Mikuro)
Voiced by: Mari Kirimura (credited as Kirika Waō in visual novels)

A heterochromic raillord acting as a parts donor for Hachiroku, living a quiet life in retirement as a display piece in a zoo. Similar to Hachiroku, she is a personification of the JGR Class 8620 2-6-0 Mogul-type steam locomotive; she however is a personification of number 38696.

Suika (西瓜, Suika)
Voiced by: Ayaka Igasaki

A raillord who works on the Nakakuni National Railway. Fluent in Japanese and with a vast knowledge of railroad operations, she is very kind and always eager to learn more. She is the personification of the China Railway DF4 electric locomotive, representing locomotive 4 2000.

Suika also appears in both seasons of the anime, also voiced by Igasaki.

Liu Zhihuan (劉 志寰, Ryū Shikan)
Voiced by: Ryō Azuma (credited as Rio Raiba in visual novels)

A young engineer on the Nakakuni National Railway and Suika's current driver; his father was Suika's previous driver. Has a crush on Suika.

Jiang Yehuang (姜 叶煌, Kyō Yōkō)
Voiced by: Kanoko

Secretary of the Deputy Director of the Railway Department of the Nakakuni State Council. A friend of Kisaki, she invites Sōtetsu over to Nakakuni to help with revitalizing the railway network there.

No. 19
Voiced by: Ren Ke (credited as Kokomi in visual novels)

A raillord who works on the Baiwa Railway. Living a leisurely life with the flora and fauna of the area, she takes Sōtetsu and his friends on a sightseeing trip around Nakakuni. She is the personification of the Jiayang Coal Railway Class ZM16-4-C2 0-8-0 steam locomotive, representing locomotive 19.

Konta Gotō (後藤 塊太, Gotō Konta)

High-ranking individual of the Ohitoyo Railway. Has a strong will and is willing to do whatever it takes to get him to the top.

Chikage Nakamura (中村 千景, Nakamura Chikage)

Nagi's friend and rival, seeking to outdo her in most things. Always prepared, her results are consistent.

=== Anime ===
Suzushiro (すずしろ)
Voiced by: Sumire Uesaka

Personification of the JNR Class C12 2-6-2T Prairie-type steam locomotive. She represents steam locomotive C12 67. Noted as eloquent and capable of leading.

Ran (ラン)
Voiced by: Aya Uchida

Personification of the JNR Class D51 2-8-2 Mikado-type steam locomotive. She represents steam locomotive D51 840. Confident and passionate.

Kiko (汽子)
Voiced by: Aya Suzaki

Personification of the JGR HoJi 6005 series steam railcar. She represents steam railcar HoJi 6016. Kiko is noted as being refined and partakes in luxurious activities.

Beni (紅)
Voiced by: Tomoyo Kurosawa

Personification of the Kagoshima Kotsu KiHa 100 series diesel railcar. She represents diesel railcar KiHa 101. Highly competitive.

Riiko (りいこ)
Voiced by: Yurika Kubo

Personification of the Tobu Railway Class B1 4-4-0 American-type steam locomotive. She represents locomotive number 5. She is lazy, aloof and lacks any form of attention span.

Iyo (いよ)
Voiced by: Ai Furihata

Personification of the Iyo Railway Class Kō 1 0-4-0WT steam locomotive. She represents locomotive number 1. She has a laid-back and friendly personality.

Kakaa (かかあ)
Voiced by: Mai Nagai

Personification of the Jōmō Electric Railway DeHa 100 series electric railcar. She represents locomotive DeHa 101. Has a motherly personality and is often very busy.

Shirogane (しろがね)
Voiced by: Chihiro Kamijo

Personification of the JNR Class EF10 electric locomotive. She represents locomotive EF10 23. Very reserved; it often seems like she is in her own world.

Kaniko (かにこ)
Voiced by: Rie Tanaka

Personification of the JNR Class C11 2-6-4T Adriatic-type steam locomotive. She represents steam locomotive C11 202. Noted as clumsy, but eager to learn. She has a deep love for her railway.

Noire (ノワール)
Voiced by: Aya Yamane

Personification of the JNR Class 9600 2-8-0 Consolidation-type steam locomotive. She represents steam locomotive 29612. Quiet, serious and with a penchant for crying. Noted for her high fuel consumption.

Nako (なこ)
Voiced by: Miyuri Shimabukuro

Personification of the JNR Class DD51 diesel-hydraulic locomotive. She represents locomotive DD51 75. Curt and tends to speak her mind and is usually criticized for doing so, but is noted as being an idealist. Often researches about the latest technology.

Torako (とらこ)
Voiced by: Rina Hidaka

Personification of the Kagoshima City Tram 500 series streetcar. She represents locomotive 512. Converted into a maintenance of way vehicle used to water the sides of the track to wash away volcanic ash (similar to the real No. 512), she has a single-tracked mind, being hard to sway her when she is set on something.

Kiriko (切子)
Voiced by: Azusa Tadokoro

Personification of the JNR Class C51 4-6-2 Pacific-type steam locomotive. She represents steam locomotive C51 67. Has a very shapely appearance; tries to make work fun due to past experiences.

Umi (海)
Voiced by: Kaede Hondo

Personification of the JNR KiHa 58 series diesel railcar. She represents railcar KiHa 58 568. Has blue eyes due to an apparent manufacturing defect; she loves anything and everything relating to the sea.

Mumumu (むむむ)
Voiced by: Tomori Kusunoki

Personification of the JNR Class D60 2-8-4 Berkshire-type steam locomotive. She represents steam locomotive D60 66. Dresses like a detective and is noted for her ability to find lost things without fail.

== Anime ==
Rail Romanesque, an anime spinoff of Maitetsu featuring new characters, aired from October 3 to December 19, 2020, on Tokyo MX and other channels. (Note: Tokyo MX listed the series premiere at 25:00 on October 2, 2020, which is October 3 at 1:00 a.m.) The series was animated by the studio Saetta, and it was directed by Hisayoshi Hirasawa. The production held a crowdfunding campaign in July 2020. In September 2020, Tenka Hashimoto, who was initially cast to play the character Shirogane, stepped down from her role following professional controversy; she was replaced by Chihiro Kamijō.

On December 12, 2020, a second season was announced.

Two years later on October 7, 2022, during the Lose Last Concert in Tokyo Dome City Hall, another announcement regarding the second season was made, officially being titled Rail Romanesque 2. Kaniko and four other raillords including a JNR Class 9600, JGR Class C51 and JNR Class D60 were revealed, with the announcement ending with the airing year to be 2023, though a month and date were not revealed. On July 13, 2023, it was announced that the second season would air in October 2023, with animation production by Yokohama Animation Laboratory and Cloud Hearts. It aired from October 6 to December 29, 2023, on Tokyo MX and other channels.
