= Fumino =

- Gender: Female

Origin
- Origin: Japanese
- Meaning: Different meanings depending on the kanji used

Fumino (written: 文乃 or ふみの in hiragana) is a feminine Japanese given name. Notable people with the name include:

- Fumino (ふみの; born 2006), Japanese singer
- Fumino Hayashi (林 ふみの), Japanese manga artist
- Fumino Kimura (木村 文乃; born 1987), Japanese actress
- Fumino Sugiyama (杉山 文野; born 1981), Japanese transgender activist and former fencer

== Fictional characters ==
- Fumino Furuhashi (古橋 文乃), a character in the manga series We Never Learn
- Fumino Serizawa (芹沢 文乃), a character in the light novel series Mayoi Neko Overrun!
- Fumino Sato (佐藤 史乃), a character in the manga series High School Girls
