= Kida =

Kida or KIDA may refer to:

- Kida (surname), including a list of people with the name
- Kida (singer) (Orhidea Latifi, born 1997), a Kosovo-Albanian singer
- KIDA, a former television station in Sun Valley, Idaho, U.S.
- Kida Station, in Ama, Aichi Prefecture, Japan
- Kid A, 2000 studio album by Radiohead
- 5140 Kida, a main-belt asteroid
- Idaho Falls Regional Airport, Idaho, U.S., ICAO airport code KIDA
- Kida, a character from Atlantis: The Lost Empire
- Masaomi Kida, a character from the Japanese series Durarara!!
