= Ayako Fujiki =

- Born: Tokyo, Japan
- Occupation: Musician
- Instrument(s): Pianist, composer, producer
- Years active: 2004 − present
- Website: ayakofujiki.com

Ayako Fujiki (アヤコ・フジキ）is a London-based Japanese pianist, composer, and Steinway Artist. She was born in Tokyo and started playing the piano at a very early age.

== Career ==
Ayako Fujiki studied with some great pianists of the 20th century, such as Alicia de Larrocha, Carmen Mompou, Carlota Garriga, Jan Wijn and Narcis Bonet. She specialized in Spanish music and received the titles of “Specialisation in Spanish Music” and “Master of Spanish Music” from the Granados-Marshall Academy in Barcelona.

She has released several albums, such as “Franz Schubert”, “Goyescas” (a tribute to her teacher Alicia de Larrocha), “Fantasia” and “Brightwater” (a collection of her own compositions that incorporate classical and electronic music techniques).

She has performed in international music festivals and halls in Japan, Spain, United Kingdom, France, Italy, Austria, Switzerland, Colombia, Serbia and Bulgaria.

She is also a composer who creates original music for piano, strings, and orchestra. She has collaborated with musicians such as Grigor Palikarov, Piero Romano, Yuriy Yanko, Cristian Chivu, Cristoforo Pestalozzi, etc. She has been praised for her high sensitivity, excellent piano-playing skills, and promising career by critics and mentors.

== Discography ==
Album

- 2009 Franz Schubert - Anton Serra & Ayako Fujiki
- 2010 Goyescas - los majos enamorados - (Hommage to Alicia de Larrocha)
- 2015 Brightwater (original album)
- 2018 Fantasia (Collections of Fantasies of Schumann, Mendelssohn, Turina, Falla, Liszt)
- 2021 Le Stagioni by Mario Castelnuovo-Tedesco
- 2021 Les Saisons Op. 201 by Isaac Albeniz
- 2021 Seasons from Cinderella by Sergei Prokofiev
- 2022 John Cage : The Seasons
- 2022 Four Seasons of Japan for Four Hands by Yoshinao Nakada
- 2023 Aëther - Ayako Fujiki & Oliver Schmitz

Single

- 2019 Rhapsodie Espagnole, S.254

== Awards ==
- Specialisation in Spanish music" in 2005 by Granados-Marshall Academy in Barcelona, Spain sung by Alicia de Larrocha.
- "Master of Spanish Music” in 2007 by Granados-Marshall Academy in Barcelona, Spain sung by Alicia de Larrocha.
- In 2014 the Japanese Embassy honoured her for a remarkable cultural contribution to the Japan–Spain relationship.
- Appointed as a Steinway Artist in 2023.
