= Maria (Japanese singer) =

Ayaka Larrison
- Also known as: Maria マリア
- Born: Ayaka Itō (伊藤彩華, Itō Ayaka); January 29, 1987 (age 39)
- Origin: Tokyo, Japan
- Genres: Japanese Pop
- Occupations: Singer, actress
- Years active: 1998–present
- Label: Universal Music Japan
- Website: universal-music.co.jp/maria/

Ayaka Larrison, formerly known as Maria (マリア), born Ayaka Itō (伊藤彩華, Itō Ayaka) on January 29, 1987, is a Japanese pop singer signed under Universal Music Japan. She had been active in singing for several years before debuting as a solo artist in 2009. Maria plays electric guitar and writes her own lyrics.

== Career ==
Ayaka began her career as a member of Nansho Kids, a sub-group of the famous stage group Minami Aoyama Shōjo Kageki Dan (南青山少女歌劇団, South Aoyama Female Opera Group). The first noticeable role in her career was her role as young Nala in the Japanese version of the musical The Lion King.

Later in 2002, Ayaka was part of a three-member girlband called SpringS, along with Aya Hirano and Yuuki Yoshida. The unit disbanded in 2003, after releasing one album and four singles. In 2006, she formed the duo 'ltokubo' with Keiko Kubota. Due to a suggestion from Shouko Nakagawa, one of her close friends, in 2007 she went on a music coaching school and finally made her own debut two years later under the name Maria.

In 2012 Ayaka went on hiatus to focus on studying abroad. She came back to Japan in 2014 and continued performing lives as well as musicals. She has since gone by the stage name Ayaka Larrison - her father's family name.

== Discography ==
=== Solo discography ===
Albums

1. [2010.02.24] – WILL

Singles

1. [2009.05.20] – Getaway #63
2. [2009.07.15] – Goin' My Way #55
3. [2009.10.28] – D.I.T. #27
4. [2010.01.27] – Wasuretakunakute (忘れたくなくて) #30

=== SpringS discography ===
Albums

1. [2003.03.26] – Springs Super Best

Singles

1. [2003.01.22] – DOWN TOWN
2. [2003.02.26] – Kogarashi ni Dakarete (木枯しに抱かれて, Held in the Cold Wintry Wind)
3. [2003.03.26] – Raspberry Dream
4. [2003.09.03] – Identified

=== Itokubo discography ===
Singles

1. [2007.11.21] – Into the sky
