= Aya Biosphere Reserve =

UNESCO Man and the Biosphere Programme in the south of Kyushu Island, Japan

- Location within Japan
- Location: Japan
- Nearest city: Aya, Miyazaki
- Coordinates: 32°3′24″N 131°26′11″E
- Area: surface 14,580 ha, core 682 ha, buffer 8,982 ha, transition 4,916 ha,
- Designated: 2012, inaugurated in 2013
- Governing body: Kyushu Regional Forest Office

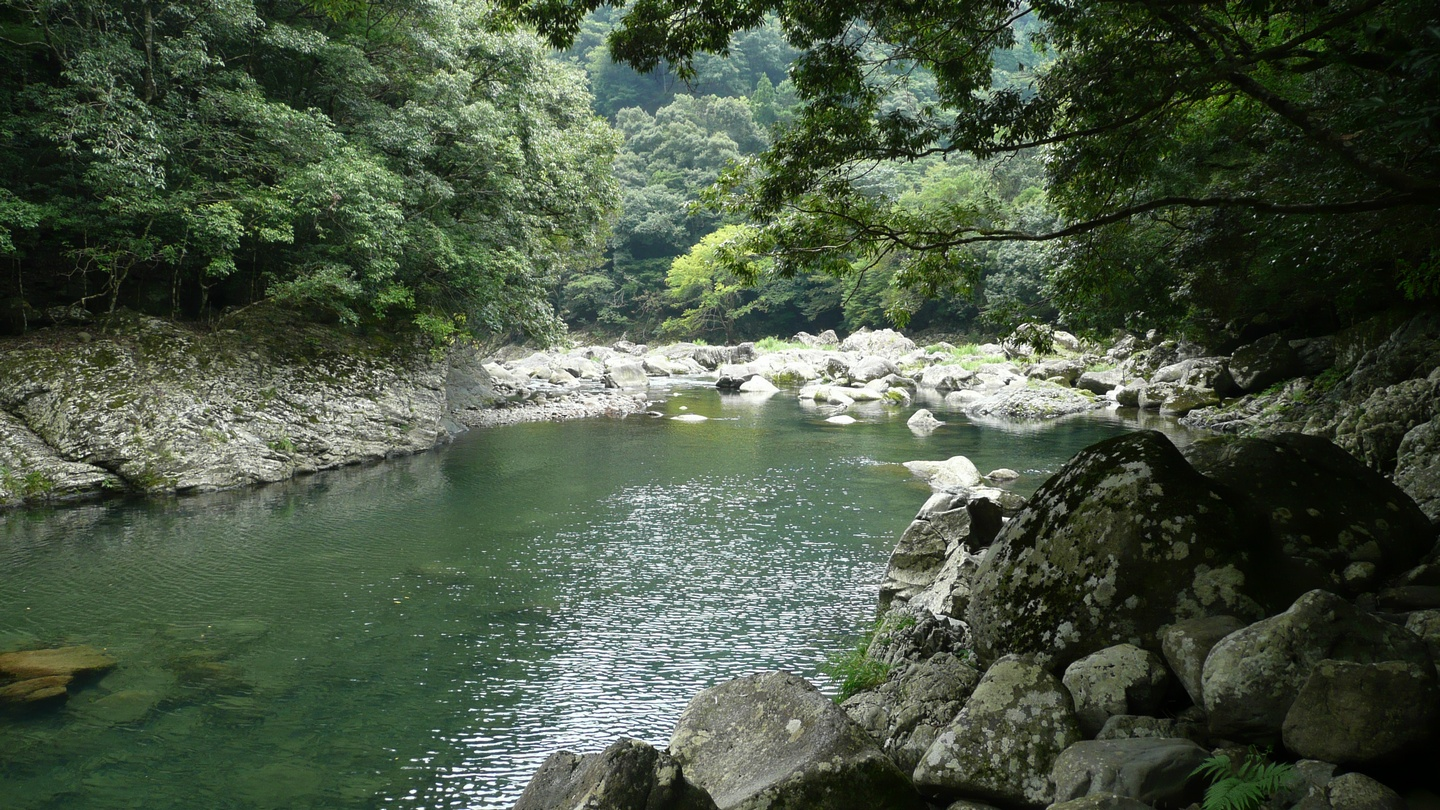
Aya laurel forest (Ayagawa River)

The Aya Biosphere Reserve (established in 2012) is a UNESCO Man and the Biosphere Programme in the south of Kyushu Island, Japan. It harbours one of the country’s largest remaining lucidophyllous forests. The forest shows high biodiversity and embraces many indigenous species. Forest therapy and traditional recycling based agriculture in Aya Town are an ecotourism draw to the Biosphere Reserve.

== Ecological characteristics ==
Aya Biosphere Reserve consists of a plateau containing high relief mountains (over 600m), low relief Mountains (200–400 m) and Shirasu (deposits of volcanic ash and sand) layers, as well as a flat alluvial plain around the confluence of the Ayakita and Ayaminami Rivers. It is located near the centre of Miyazaki Prefecture in Southeastern Kyushu, where the Kyushu Central Mountains and the Miyazaki Plain meet.

Lucidophyllous forests within the Biosphere Reserve consist of many species endemic to Japan. Lucidophyllous forests in East Asia are unique as they have lain on the border of two floras (one is formed by mainly tropical evergreen trees, and the other by temperate deciduous trees) since the Cretaceous Period when angiosperms were first born (143 - 65 million years ago).

Forests account for 88% (12,839ha) of the total area of the Biosphere Reserve out of which about 16% (2,330ha) are natural lucidophyllous forests and about 25% (3,675ha) are secondary lucidophyllous forests (secondary vegetation).

1033 botanical species, 145 fungal species, 70 avian species and 19 mammal species have been identified in the Biosphere Reserve. The area around Aya Town is the southern limit of habitats for the Japanese serow and golden eagles.

== Socio-economic characteristics ==
The Biosphere Reserve includes Aya Town in the transition zone, which has a population of 7,283. The core area is made up of the preserved district of the Aya Forestry Ecosystem Protected Area and is included in the Kyushu Central Mountains Quasi National Park. The area has never been used for human activities and is the object of scientific studies on the structure, function and dynamics of the lucidophyllous forest. The transition zone is mainly used for organic agriculture, and Aya Town is the first community in the country to develop a traditional recycling-oriented agricultural system, put in place in 1988. Ecotourism, including “forest therapy” (for healing purposes) and forest environmental education, is actively developed.

== See also ==
- Kyūshū Chūō Sanchi Quasi-National Park

== Sources ==
This article incorporates text from a free content work (license statement/permission). Text taken from UNESCO - MAB Biosphere Reserves Directory, UNESCO, UNESCO.
