= Ayaka Ohmichi =

Japanese actress (born 1995)

- 大道 彩香
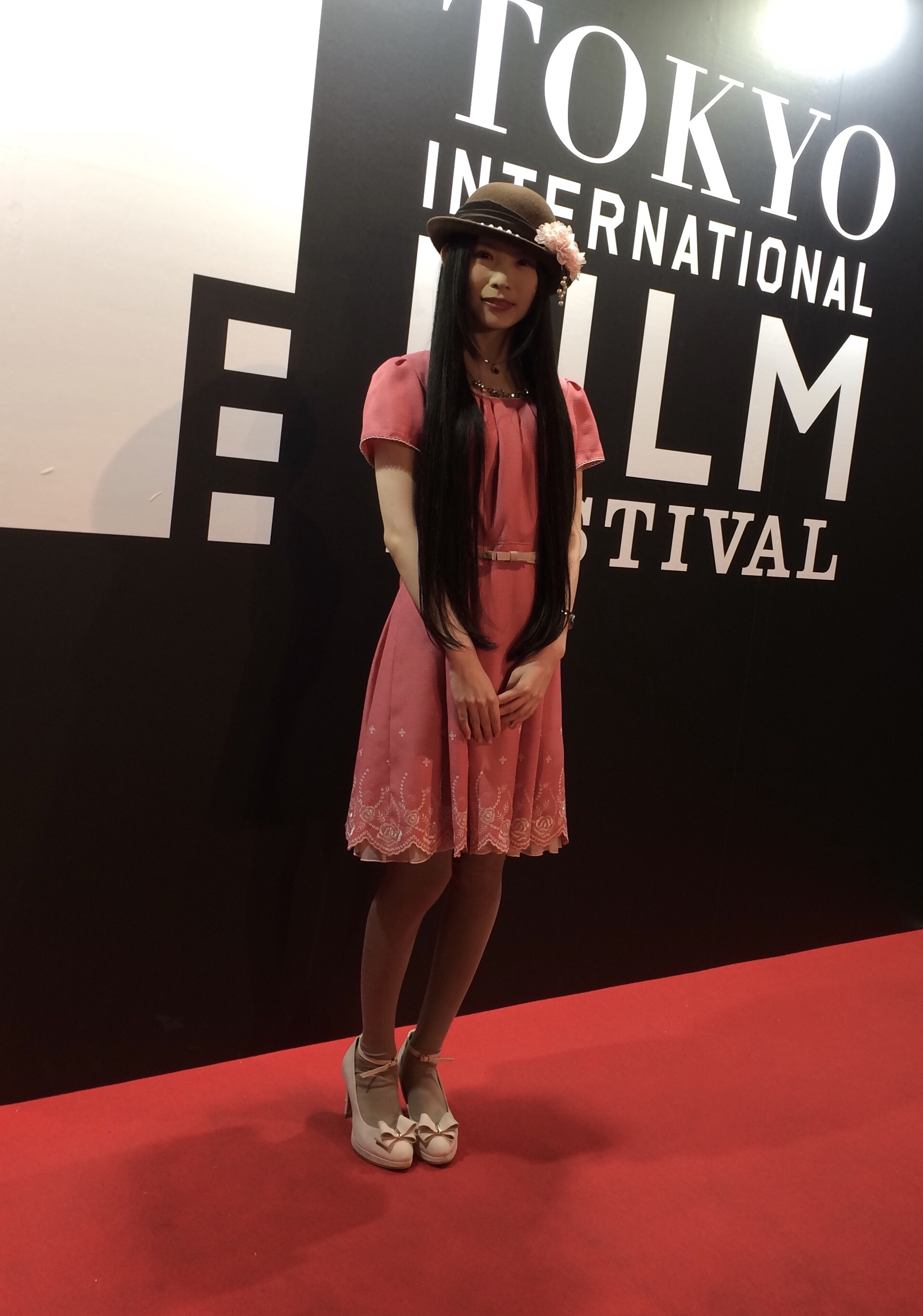
- Tokyo International Film Festival in Japan
- Born: September 1, 1995 (age 30); Japan
- Occupation: Actress
- Years active: 2006–present
- Website: AYAKA OHMICHI OFFICIAL WEBSITE

Ayaka Ohmichi (大道 彩香, Ohmichi Ayaka; born June 1, 1996) is a Japanese actress. Born in Japan, she started her acting career at age 14. She landed her first acting role at age 15 as the character in the Fish Story. She later made her film debut in the Shodou Girls at age 16, and the same director film "the house of rising sun" at age 18 both from public audition.

At the age of 21, she started taking photography named "iPhone Art", to express her inner self rather than acting roles and she took a break from acting career. In 2018, she signed to her first starring movie at the same time as her reopening of acting career. She then moved to the United States to pursue her acting career.

== Career ==
=== Early acting roles (2006-) ===
Since early in her acting career at age 14, she has focused only on pursuing “profound” acting.

== Filmography ==
=== Film ===
Year	Title	Role	Notes	Ref.
2009	Fish Story			
2009	Boku no Hatsukoi wo Kimi ni Sasagu (I Give My First Love to You)			
2010	Shodō Girls: Blue Blue Sky (Calligraphy Girls)	Miki		
2011	Imo Ten Girls × Imo Ten Boys			
2013	Asahi no Ataru Ie (the House of a Rising Sun)	Sayaka	Released in 2013, additional screenings from 2014	
2018	Yume Miru Ningyō-tachi (Dreaming Dolls)	Lead role	Production scheduled to start in 2018	

=== Television series ===
Year	Title	Role	Network	Ref.
2008	Code Blue: Doctor Heli Kinkyū Kyūmei		Fuji TV	
2009	Gyōretsu no Dekiru Hōritsu Sōdanjo	Herself (guest)	NTV	

=== Stage ===
Year	Title	Role	Notes	Ref.
2010	Sakura no Ki no Shita de ~again~	Yukihime	Heroine	
2011	Show Must Go On	Yuna		
2011	Gorgeous Time	Nagisa	Heroine	
2012	Aoi Hoshi to, Watashi no Toilet. (The Blue Star and My Toilet)			

=== Commercials ===
Year	Product / Company	Notes	Ref.
2008	Kamiike Driving School		
2009	Win Bird		
–2013	Various catalog modeling	Print / promotional catalogs	

=== Radio dramas ===
Year	Title	Role	Station	Ref.
2009	S54	Haruna	FM	
2012	Munapoke☆Heroes		FM	

=== Publications ===
Year	Title	Format	Ref.
2014	PORTRAIT ~Nihon no Joyū~	Digital photobook	
2014	Kurokami Bishōjo	Digital photobook	
2015	Ayaka Daidō Official Blog (temporary)	Blog	

=== Campaigns ===
Year(s)	Campaign	Role / Notes	Ref.
2010–2011	Kōkō Yakyū Ōen Girls (High School Baseball Support Girls)	Campaign ambassador	
2013	Government Mascot "Shusse Daimyō Ieyasu-kun"	Navigator / campaign representative	
–2014	Various photo sessions and public events	Model / Guest appearance	

=== Promotional Movies ===
Year	Title	Role	Notes
2022–present	Official Promotional Movie (EN)	Herself	Shooting

=== Other activities ===
She has also participated in a wide range of performances and public appearances, including:

- Independent and major films
- Television series and variety shows
- Stage productions
- Fashion catalogs and runway shows
- Radio programs and concerts
- Dance live performances and other entertainment events

== Personal life ==
According to her official profile, she is an INFP and has been diagnosed as a Highly Sensitive Person (HSP), which is reflected in the introspective and emotionally nuanced tone of her performances and visual work.
