= Ibrahima Aya =

Malian writer

- Born: 10 October 1967 (age 58); Goundam, Mali

Ibrahima Aya (born 10 October 1967 in Goundam, Mali) is a Malian writer.

== Biography ==
Ibrahima Aya studied agronomy in the Moldavian SSR. He became an agronomist, notable for an integrated lake development project, and a consultant for the organisation for Malian aid and development, Aide et Développement au Mali. Since 2001, he has worked as an independent consultant.

In addition to his development work Ibrahima Aya devotes himself to writing. In 2001, he published Le vieux pagne ("The Old Pagne"), and in 2002 Riche ou pauvre pour un mois ("Rich or Poor For a Month").

Since July 2002, he contributes monthly to the Malian daily L'Essor. Some of his writings describe an imaginary world pieced together from various facts; others portray ordinary village goings-on. An anthology of his work has been compiled.

Ibrahima Aya is president of the association La Jeune Société du Savoir ("The young society of knowledge"). She participated in Retour de Bamako III.

== Bibliography ==
- Le vieux pagne ("The Old Pagne") (Jamana, 2001)
- Riche ou pauvre pour un mois ("Rich or Poor For a Month") (Jamana, 2002)
- Les larmes de Djoliba ("Djoliba's Tears")
