= Ayasa =

Ayasa (あやさ, アヤサ) is a feminine Japanese given name. Notable people with the name include:

- Ayasa (violinist) (born 1991), Japanese violinist
- Ayasa Itō (伊藤 彩沙; born 1996), Japanese voice actress

== Fictional characters ==
- Ayasa Tachibana, a character in the manga series Harukana Receive
