= Ayami =

- Gender: Female

Origin
- Origin: Japanese
- Meaning: Different meanings depending on the kanji used

Ayami (written: 文美, 綾美, 綾実, 礼美, 彩未 or あやみ in hiragana) is a feminine Japanese given name. Notable people with the name include:

- Ayami Kojima (小島 文美), Japanese illustrator and video game artist
- Ayami Mutō (武藤 彩未; born 1996), Japanese idol and singer
- Ayami Nakajo (中条 あやみ; born 1997), Japanese actress and model
- Ayami Oishi (大石 綾美; born 1991), Japanese rower
- Ayami Sato (里 綾実; born 1989), Japanese baseball player
- Ayami Takase (高瀬 礼美; born 1978), Japanese tennis player
- Ayami Yukimori (行森 文美; born 1969), Japanese gymnast
