= Aya Brown =

American artist (born 1995)

Aya Brown (born 1995) is an American visual artist, whose drawing practice centers representation of Black community experiences in Brooklyn, New York.

== Early life and education ==
Aya Brown was born in 1995, and raised in Prospect Heights, Brooklyn. She is Black and Japanese, and is queer. Throughout childhood, Brown would draw as a form of her creative expression.

In adulthood, Brown pursued a Bachelor's of Fine Arts degree at the Cooper Union in Manhattan, New York. During her time at Cooper Union, she faced difficult experiences connecting to her identity as a Black student, leading to her decision to leave the program in 2017.

== Notable works ==
With her series of drawings made in 2020, Essential Workers Series, Aya Brown depicted Black and Brown essential workers in New York. Brown witnessed the care and labor of the many Black and Brown nurses working during the COVID-19 pandemic after seeking emergency care at a New York hospital in January 2020. Reflecting on her experience at the hospital inspired her to create artworks with essential workers in her community as the main subject. Working in colored pencils on brown paper, Brown created the series of drawn portraits representing essential workers from her life in New York.
