= Fumino Sugiyama =

Japanese transgender activist

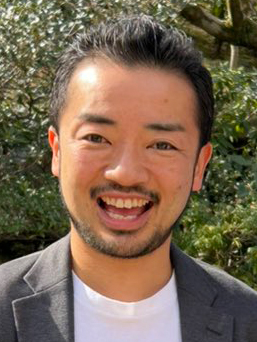
- Sugiyama in 2023

Personal information
- Born: August 10, 1981 (age 45) Shinjuku, Tokyo, Japan
- Education: Waseda University (B.A., M.A.)
- Height: 163 cm (5 ft 4 in)
- Children: 2

Sport
- Country: Japan
- Sport: Fencing

Fumino Sugiyama (杉山文野, Sugiyama Fumino; born August 10, 1981) is a Japanese transgender activist and former fencer. He is a co-representative director of Tokyo Rainbow Pride, an annual festival that celebrates Tokyo's LGBT community and has served as a member of the Shibuya Ward Gender Equality and Diversity Society Promotion Council, a director of the Japan Fencing Association, and the Japanese Olympic Committee. He has also authored several books, including Double Happiness in 2006.

== Early life and career ==
Sugiyama was born on August 10, 1981, in Shinjuku, Tokyo, the second son of Motoshige Sugiyama, the manager of the tonkatsu restaurant Suzuya in Kabukichō. He attended schools attached to Japan Women's University, graduating from high school in 2000 and entering Waseda University's School of Education. After graduating with a bachelor's degree, he entered the university's Graduate School of Education and graduated from there with a master's degree.

== Athletic career ==
Previously practicing swimming and kendo, Sugiyama went into fencing at the age of 10 as he "saw no difference between female and male uniforms," but stated that he did not feel comfortable in the sport due to him being in the female team and it being a male-dominated sport. He joined the Women's fencing team in 2004, but left the team in 2006. In 2012, he retired from fencing, later stating that he did so after he decided to come out as transgender and did not know if he would be accepted by his team.

== Activism ==
After leaving the Olympic team, Sugiyama published an autobiography called Double Happiness, where he talked about his experience with gender dysphoria, with the book later being translated into Korean and being made into a manga, illustrated by Miyuki Yorita.

In 2021, Sugiyama was appointed as a member of the Japan Fencing Federation and the Japanese Olympic Committee, becoming its first openly transgender board member. The Committee faced backlash due to them identifying Sugiyama as part of their "women's quota," with the Committee apologizing to Sugiyama soon afterwards.

In 2023, he met with U.S. Representatives Mark Takano, Maxwell Frost, Alexandria Ocasio-Cortez, Frank Pallone, and French Hill as a part of an organized trip by the Maureen and Mike Mansfield Foundation.

== Personal life ==
He has stated that he had struggled with gender dysphoria throughout his life before transitioning. In 2009, Sugiyama had a mastectomy and met Gon Matsunaka, who would become a fellow LGBT activist. In 2018, his girlfriend, who he had been dating since 2008, announced that she gave birth to a daughter with the help of a sperm donation from Matsunaka. Sugiyama has stated that Matsunaka visits their house to take care of their daughter. In December 2020, his girlfriend gave birth to a son.
