= Kyūshū Chūō Sanchi Quasi-National Park =

- 九州中央山地国定公園
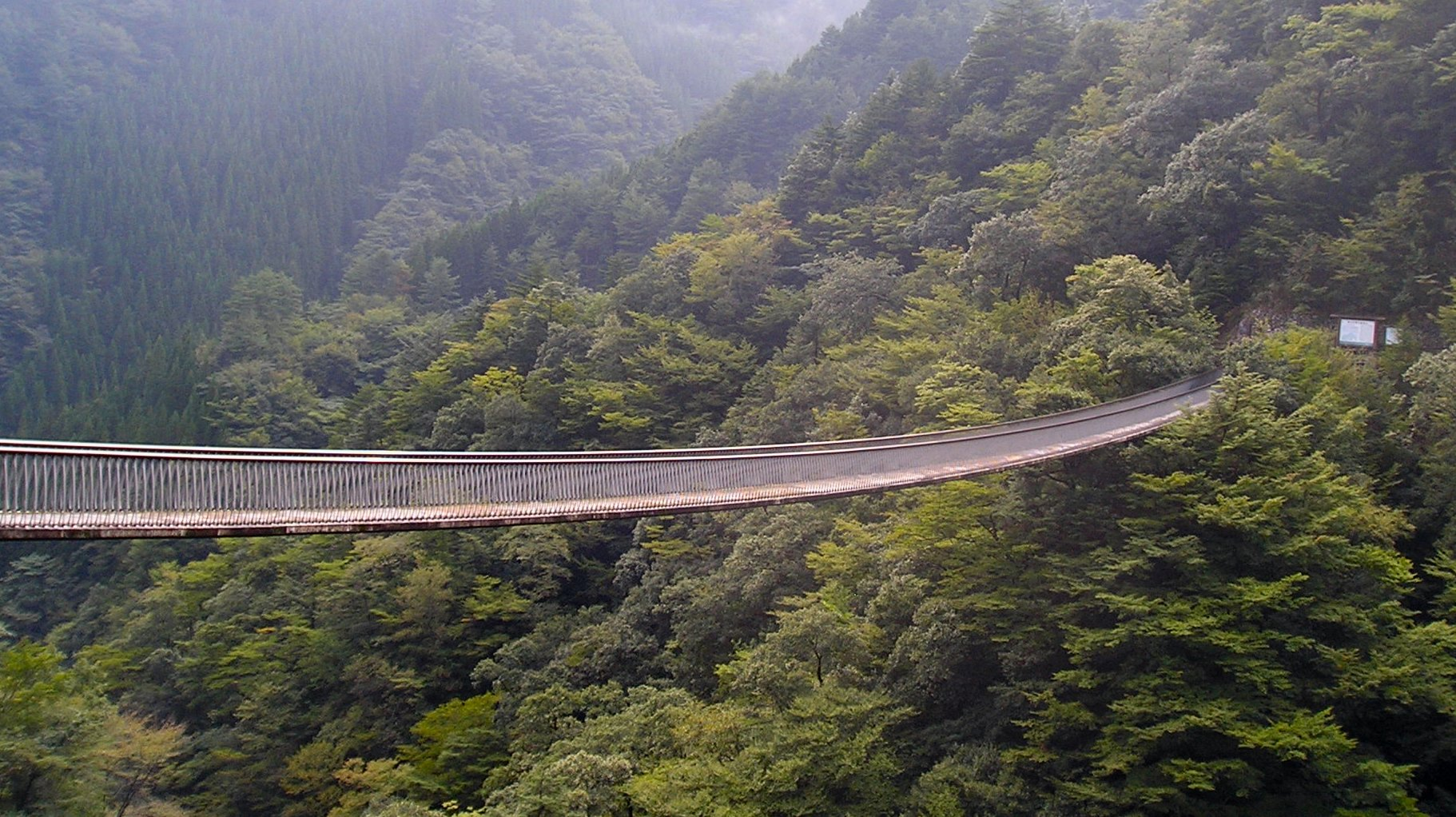
- Umenokidokoro

- Location within Japan
- Location: Kumamoto/Miyazaki Prefecture, Japan
- Coordinates: 32°25′59″N 130°58′08″E
- Area: 271 km^{2} (105 sq mi)
- Established: May 15, 1982

Kyūshū Chūō Sanchi Quasi-National Park (九州中央山地国定公園, Kyūshū Chūō Sanchi Kokutei Kōen) is a Quasi-National Park in Kumamoto Prefecture and Miyazaki Prefecture, Japan. It was founded on 15 May 1982 and has an area of 271 km^{2} (105 sq mi). The park includes Aya Biosphere Reserve in its territory.

== See also ==
- List of national parks of Japan
