= Aya Castle =

Building in Aya, Miyazaki Prefecture, Japan

Coordinates: 32°00′12″N 131°14′57″E

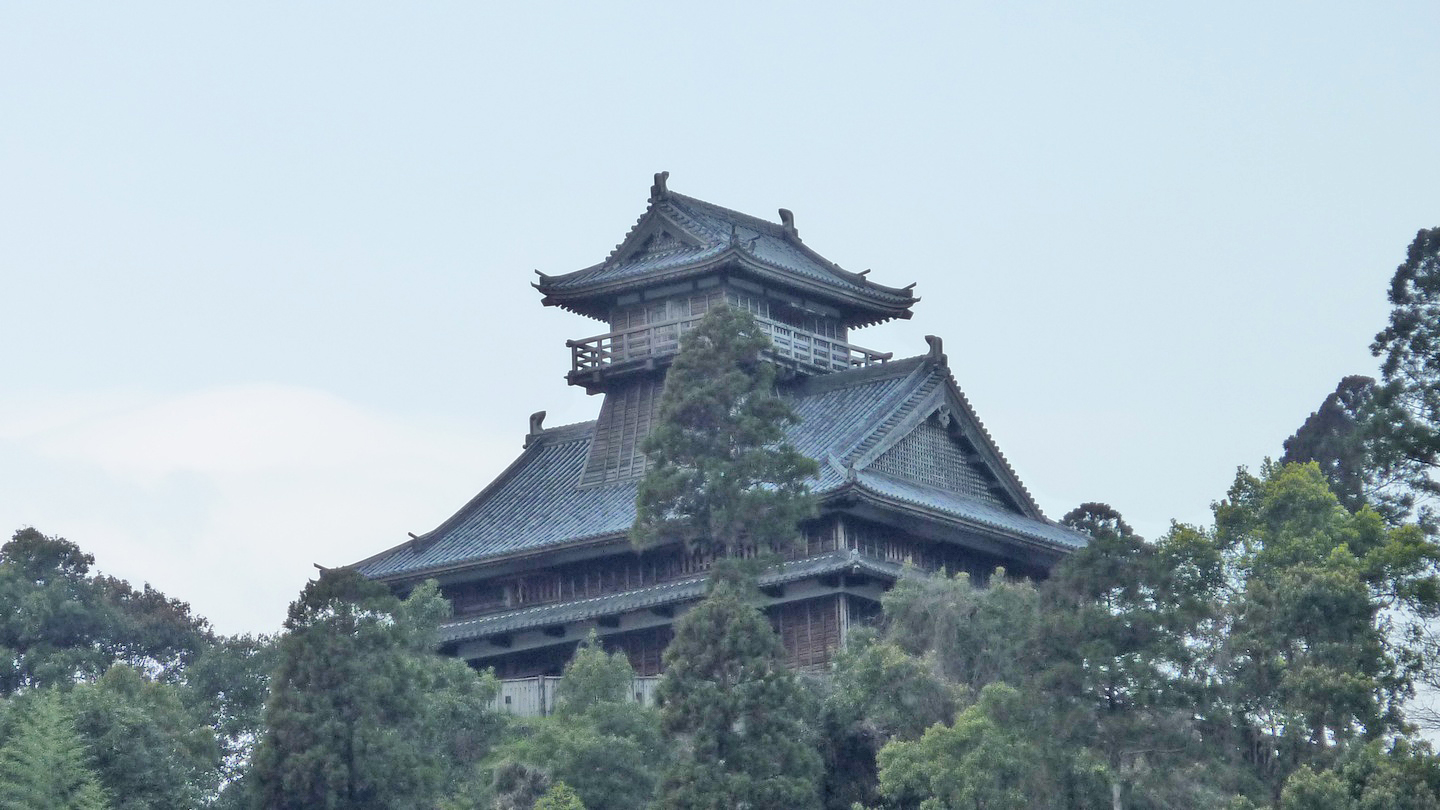
Aya Castle

Aya Castle (綾城, Aya-jō) is a castle located in Aya, Miyazaki Prefecture, Japan.

== History ==
Aya was built between around 1331 and around 1334. Its name derives from the man who oversaw the construction of the castle, who referred to himself only as "Aya" (his real name was Koshiro Yoshito). His family ruled over the castle until the Muromachi period, when the head of the Itō Clan took over Aya Castle, which was one of 48 under their control and considered to be their most strategic against the Shimazu. The Shimazu Clan seized the castle following their victory over the Itō in 1577. The castle was then given to Niiro Hisatoki, one of the retainers for the Shimazu Clan. Toyotomi Hideyoshi conquered the castle for a short period ten years later. In 1615, however, the castle was destroyed due to a shogunal decree that every domain could have only one castle.

The castle keep, or tenshu, was rebuilt in 1985 out of wood, and was based on pictures of other castles of the era. It houses a museum that has items pertaining to the castle's history.
