= Aya Kida =

Japanese photographer

Aya Kida (木田 綾, Kida Aya; born May 22, 1974) is a Japanese photographer.

Kida was born in Kiyose, Japan. After graduating from high school in 1993, she entered a prep school to study for the exam to get into art school. In 1995 she began working as an artist's model. In 1997 her photograph collection "Happy Birthday to You" won an award when it was exhibited as part of a show at the Tokyo Photographic Art Museum.

Her work focused on the daily lives on women in their early 20s.
