= Ayaka Igasaki =

Japanese voice actress, scriptwriter and voice drama producer

- 伊ヶ崎綾香
- Occupations: Voice actress; Scriptwriter
- Years active: 2012–present
- Website: http://sirokuma-ayaka.info/

Ayaka Igasaki (伊ヶ崎 綾香, Ayaka Igasaki) is a Japanese voice actress, scriptwriter and voice drama (Note: A sub-genre of voice drama in particular. It is also known as situation voice drama which is less used in practice though. The main difference between situation voice drama and story-telling voice drama is that in the former the listener has a first-person perspective, while in the latter the listener is a third-person observer. Another difference is that the situation dramas usually have only one character in it, while most story-telling voice dramas have multiple characters, although this may change according to the settings.) producer, whose main works are voice dramas recorded using binaural recording methods. She also performs in various bishōjo games as a voice actress.

== Biography ==
She is the founder of the dōjin circle "Shirokuma no Yome (シロクマの嫁, Shirokuma no Yome; White Bear's Wife)" and its sister circle "Blackuma no Yome (ブラックマの嫁, Blackuma no Yome; Black Bear's Wife)". She is also the founder, producer, director, scriptwriter, and audio engineer of the bishōjo game brand "Shiro Kuma Dango (しろくまだんご, Shiro Kuma Dango; White Bear Wood Bug)".

Igasaki used to work in an ear-cleaning salon (耳かき店, Mimikaki Ten)(耳かき専門店) in Tokyo for several years. She is described as a perfectionist. This aspect of her personality is seen in her works, especially in audio recording and editing.

"Igasaki" is her stage name, which comes from a character in the anime Nintama Rantarō (忍たま乱太郎; "Rantarō the Ninja Boy").

== List of Voice Performances ==
Voice Drama (Igasaki's Personal Circles)
Year	Title	Role (Note: Role names are omitted if there is only one character in a work.)	Circle	Source
2012	Stereophonic Sound - Mimikaki Voice (Nurse ver.) Another Story		Shirokuma no Yome	
2013	Stereophonic Sound - Older Sister's Prank ~on train, on phone and in room~		Shirokuma no Yome	
2013	Stereophonic Sound - Sleeping by Your Side ~Ideal Wife Ver.~		Shirokuma no Yome	
2013	Stereophonic Sound - Sleeping by Your Side ~Ideal Sisters Ver. ~		Shirokuma no Yome	
2013	Stereophonic Sound - Master's Words Are ABSOLUTE!?		Shirokuma no Yome	
2013	Stereophonic Sound - Sleeping by Your Side ~Your Personal Maid Ver.~		Shirokuma no Yome	
2013	Stereophonic Sound - Welcome to Shirokuma's Mimikaki Salon!		Shirokuma no Yome	
2013	Stereophonic Sound - Welcome to Shirokuma's Mimikaki Salon! (with Voice Toolkit)		Shirokuma no Yome	
2013	Stereophonic Sound - PC Hijack Plan		Shirokuma no Yome	
2013	Stereophonic Sound - Liaison with the Married Woman		Shirokuma no Yome	
2013	Welcome to Shirokuma's Mimikaki Salon! 2& Shirokuma's Bathhouse		Shirokuma no Yome	
2014	Knock knock, coming in!		Shirokuma no Yome	
2014	Mimikaki Research Club - Introduction and Culture Festival ver2.0		Shirokuma no Yome	
2014	Stereophonic Sound Voice CD		Shirokuma no Yome	
2014	A Place In The Mountains		Shirokuma no Yome	
2014	Endurance Training with Ms. Tomomi		Shirokuma no Yome	
2014	You Are Not A Hero!	Little Mermaid	Shirokuma no Yome	
2014	Delusional!? Diary of a Rampaging Maid		Shirokuma no Yome	
2015	Sea of Stars		Shirokuma no Yome	
2015	Delusional!? Diary of a Rampaging Maid 2		Shirokuma no Yome	
2015	How to Make the Ideal Toy -Now Hiring Testers-		Shirokuma no Yome	
2015	Naptime Cafe "Sirokuma no Sippo"	Kikyou	Shirokuma no Yome	
2015	Grooming Massage [Karin]		Shirokuma no Yome	
2015	ASMR * Maid in Ayaka		Shirokuma no Yome	
2015	Pampered or Guinea Pig Hospital Life!		Shirokuma no Yome	
2015	Mimibon Ver 2! * With Binaural Whisper Ear Cleaning		Shirokuma no Yome	
2015	Mimimoto * Adult Broadcasting Station ver1 [Binaural]		Shirokuma no Yome	
2016	Mimimoto * Adult Broadcasting Station ver2 [Binaural]		Shirokuma no Yome	
2016	First Rate Relaxation ~Suite Plan at the Exclusive Dream Spa Mitsuki~		Shirokuma no Yome	
2016	Mimimoto * Parfait [Binaural]	Mitsuba	Shirokuma no Yome	
2016	Two Specialists For You ~Suite Plan at the Exclusive Dream Spa Yumemitsuki 2~	Ren	Shirokuma no Yome	
2016	Mimimoto * Adult Broadcasting Station ver3 [Binaural]		Shirokuma no Yome	
2016	Beautifully Blooming Rainbow Roses ~ Feathers of Jade ~ [Binaural]	Hisui	Shirokuma no Yome	
2017	Semen * Examination Ward	Ritsu, Riho	Shirokuma no Yome	
2017	Beautifully Blooming Rainbow Roses ~ Poetry of the Evening Calm ~ [Binaural]	Hisui	Shirokuma no Yome	
2017	Little Brothers are a Creature that just LOVE their Elder Sister right?		Shirokuma no Yome	
2017	Flower Garden of Relaxation	Sakura	Shirokuma no Yome	
2018	Flower Garden of Relaxation ~Fan Disc~	Sakura	Shirokuma no Yome	
2018	Starlit Ark		Shirokuma no Yome	
2018	Fantasy Creature Brothel ～Magical Kiss～		Blackuma no Yome	
2018	Adult Broadcasting Station ver4		Shirokuma no Yome	
2018	Cucking & Cuckolded		Blackuma no Yome	
2018	YOU ARE A SLAVE	Slave shop owner	Blackuma no Yome	
2018	Lascivious Slavery		Shirokuma no Yome	
2018	How To Train An Older Man	Sayuri	Blackuma no Yome	
2019	Auditory Cafe NEKOROBI		Shirokuma no Yome	
2019	Auditory Cafe NEKOROBI ~Free Trial Course		Shirokuma no Yome	
2019	Deep In Your Ears ~Drowning in Binaural Ear Licking Sounds~		Blackuma no Yome	
2019	Mifuyu is Streaming Her Pussy Sounds![Breathing Next to Ear - Binaural]		Blackuma no Yome	
2019	We Are the Sound Touring Club	Torii Chisato	Shirokuma no Yome	
2019	You Ears are the Subject of an Angel and Demon's Exam? ~Double Ear-licking Seduction~	Angel	Blackuma no Yome	
2019	Virgin Hunting ~Imprisoned Bondage Reverse Rape~		Blackuma no Yome	
2019	Milk Control! ~ My Broadcast Goddess Crush Cum Controls Me ~		Blackuma no Yome	
2019	(Ear Licking, Nipple Teasing) You are the Princess' Time-killing Toy ~Captured Princess~		Blackuma no Yome	
2019	Shall we search, for the sound of your sleep? ~Water, Foam, and Waves~		Shirokuma no Yome	
2020	Teach Us Brother ~Deep Teasing Ecchi!~	Erika	Blackuma no Yome	
2020	Fetish Rehabilitation ~ Full Body Development & Ear Licking		Blackuma no Yome	
2020	She'll Spoil You Rotten		Blackuma no Yome	
2020	Adult Broadcaster 5 ~Product Creation with Ayaka~		Shirokuma no Yome	
2020	Drowning In a Sea of Tentacled Ear-Pleasure		Blackuma no Yome	
2020	Ear Masturbation Specialty Parlor ~Make Good Use of My Pussy, Okay?~		Shirokuma no Yome	
2020	Reincarnation! Succubus Channel ~Give Us Lots of Semen~		Blackuma no Yome	
2020	Adult Broadcaster 6 ~Summer Vacation with Ayaka~		Shirokuma no Yome	
2020	Suzuran Forest and Bird Feather Rest- ASMR Ear Cleaning / Sleep Radio / Massage Set		Shirokuma no Yome	
2020	A Sexy Dispute!	Shrine Master	Blackuma no Yome	
2020	Adult Broadcaster 7 ~Your First Day Working at Secret Society Shirokuma~		Shirokuma no Yome	
2020	Adult Broadcaster 7.5 ~Enjoy Onahole Aya-nee~ [2+ Hours]		Shirokuma no Yome	
2020	Loved By Your Jealous Wife	Your loving wife	Blackuma no Yome	
2020	Giving Pussy Massages with Your "Massage Stick"	Eriko	Blackuma no Yome	

Voice Drama (Other Circles)Dream
Year	Title	Role	Circle	Source
2012	Stereophonic! Big Sister's Ear Cleaning, Handjob and Sleep Eros		Masters Of Ero(MOE)	
2013	How To Last Longer 2 - Premature Cure With Brother-Loving Elder Stepsister	Yurika	ristorante	
2013	Ecchi With the Brother She Adores - Best First Time		ristorante	
2013	Battledore and shuttle"Cock"		Black Shadow	
2013	Asa Ane. In the Futon with Onesan on a Lazy Sunday	Older maid	RonlyOne	
2013	Ecchi With the Brother She Adores - The Sweetest Premature Ejaculation		ristorante	
2014	hypno ear cleaning		ero trance	
2014	Lv1 Voice Quest～Wandering Warrior's Harem Paradise in Elf Kingdom~	Mei	Aomi Tori	
2014	IyashiSister -Haruka-		Die Brust	
2014	Lucid Wet Dream		ero trance	
2014	IyashiSister -Manami-		Die Brust	
2014	Classmate Confesses Her Love After School Festival		A Crayon That Draws On The Wind	
2015	Idol Training Cafe ~We Wanna Be Soothing Idols~ [Live Song Included!!]	Chisaka Airi		
2015	hypno hospital		placebo	
2015	Won't You Relax In My Hometown?		Melty Beans	
2015	Icha Love Voice In Stereo (Older Girl ver.)		laugh laugh bird	
2015	(Binaural) Whispery Ecchi ~A pulse quickening school trip experience~		A Crayon That Draws On The Wind	
2015	Whispery Voice ~A pulse quickening school trip confession~		A Crayon That Draws On The Wind	
2015	On the Verge of Ecstasy with 6 Girls ~Binaural Tantric Wank Support~		B-bishop	
2015	Lover Hypnosis - Girlfriend in Delusion		Melty Beans	
2016	Takunomi Radio	Shizuku	Aoharu	
2016	Wet Tongues	Hakuren	Otonadeya	
2016	Ms. Saki's Naughty Interrogation Tactic		Ryugutei	
2016	Phone Sex with a Sweet Lover		maloik	
2016	NTRS - 3 Reasons I Let Myself Be Netorare'd		Melty Beans	
2016	Being With Big Sister ~Pleasant Ecchi Time With Kotone-chan~		NAGOMI PROJECT	
2016	I Want A Nice JK To Take My Virginity ~St. Mercy Volunteer Club~		Amakara Gynecocracy	
2016	Ear Cleaning Priestess	Hanamori Sumire	Amaryllis girl	
2016	A Soothing Piano Melody For You		Melty Beans	
2016	Isis the Gravekeeper		Harvest	
2016	Tall Imouto-chan Toys With Shota Oniichan	Chisato	Hanakoji710	
2016	Yadonashi Sasayaki Musume		kimirinko。	
2017	Succubus Slave Succubus	Canaria	Otonadeya	
2017	[Binaural] Melty Sugar Sugar Room [Hi-res]	Saki, Miki	Melty Beans	
2017	Miss Moe's Hidden Ear-cleaning Salon	Hanae	1 Bun No Mochi Mochi Dama	
2017	Spellbound -Superb Countdown of a Beautiful Temptress-		kimirinko。	
2018	Lost Lamb's Signpost ～I Will Listen to All Your Confession〜		Choko Usagi	
2018	Honey Trap Land -Interrogation Space-		SweetNightmare	
2018	Cosplayer Sisters' Seducing Time 〜The First Ofupako Battle〜	Older sister	Choko Usagi	
2018	The Haunted Inn ~Terror of Sumeragi Ryokan~(R18)		survive	
2018	The Haunted Inn ~Terror of Sumeragi Ryokan~		survive	
2018	Ayakashi Kyoshu Tan ~Sentaku Kitune Okon~		Whisp	
2019	Ayakashi Kyoshu Tan ~Sentaku Kitune Okon・Autumn~		Whisp	
2019	Okaerinsai Goshujin Sama ~Wagamama Shiro Neko no Baai~		Kuma Neko Cafe	
2019	Bungaku Syoujyo To Fudeorosi ～ Senpai No Subete、Mi Se Te Kudasai-		Choko Usagi	
2019	Koakuma JK Shimai No Eroero Shasei Kanri ～ Mimi No Oku Made Torotoro Ni	Rina Misaki	Perspective Shojou Gensou	
2020	Name Nururi Maizuru Hime Hen Tanpen-shū. Kurenai no Aijō Tsumeawase	Haku	Otonadeya	
2020	Shitsuyō Ni Mimi o Namerare Nagara no Fude-oroshi! Jo Kantoku mo Majitte 3P Shichau3 Jikan☆	Jo Kantoku	1 Bun No Mochi Mochi Dama	
2020	スライムっ娘のあまとろ育成計画		ふあふあそふと	
2020	ハーレムギルドの誘惑大戦争～結婚(仮)スペシャル～	シスター	ちょこうさぎ	
2020	二歳くらい年上のこんな彼女がほしい音声		ことりのふみ	
2020	新人サキュバスのおち〇ぽとれーにんぐ+両耳舐め上級とれーにんぐ	ターニャ	オトエナガ	
2020	蓄音レヱル 西瓜		RailRomanesque	
2020	アナタに優しくないようでとっても優しいメイドさん		ふあふあそふと	

Anime
Year	Title (Note: Titles without official English translation are listed in Japanese language.)	Role (Note: Bold Font: main character)	Source
2019	Araiyasan!~Ore to Aitsu ga Onnayu de!?~ 洗い屋さん！～俺とアイツが女湯で！？～	Mei Sasakura	
2020	Rail Romanesque レヱル・ロマネスク	西瓜	

OVA
Year	Title	Role	Source
2018	REAL EROGAME SITUATION! THE ANIMATION Vol. 2	Torii Ui	

PC Game
Year	Title	Role	Source
2013	Yuusha Shigan 勇者志願	Yoshida Reina	
2013	Inochimijikashitatakae！Otomeyon Shugo Tenshi No Hanran 命短したたかえ！乙女4 守護天使の反乱	Asutoraanu	
2014	Mashiro Chan No Himitsu Dougu ましろちゃんのひみつ道具		
2014	Sakura Iro No Amuーru さくら色のアムール	Kanzaki Reiyaku	
2014	Oneshota Monogatari おねショタ物語	Moritani Haruka	
2015	Mayuru Chan No Himitsu Dougu まゆるちゃんのひみつ道具		
2016	HAPPENING LOVE!!	Kirishima Misaki	
2016	Sekai Ichi Yaritai Jugyou ～Hayashi Sensei No Rori Bicchi Na Hanten Sekai～ 世界一ヤリたい授業 ～林先生のロリビッチな反転世界～		
2016	Hasshiya Dekinai ooko(kari) 発射できない男(仮)	Takanashi・S・Nanaho	
2016	Kimitoyumemishi キミトユメミシ	Akane	
2016	Inraku Rirakuzeーshon ～Hosoi Yubisaki No Tekunikku～ 淫楽リラクゼーション ～細い指先のテクニック～	Awaumi Nao	
2017	Iyashi No Megami No Jikkendai（Morumotto） 癒しの女神の実験台（モルモット） (Note: Won "New Brand Awards" of "Moe Game Award 2017")	Kurosaki Sachie	
2017	Fudeoroshi Mama ～Afureru Hakudaku & Miruku～ 筆下ろしママ ～溢れる白濁&ミルク～	Miyasaki Akane	
2017	Bokura ns Skain Ns Sukufukuw W 僕らの世界に祝福を	Kusunoki Mika	
2018	REAL EROGAME SITUATION! H×3	Torii Ui	
2018	Netorare Joshi～Kareni Wa Ienai Watashi No Himitsu～ 寝取られ女子～彼にはイエナイ私のヒミツ～	Isaka Saya	
2018	Nyuuin boutouu ～Do S Naーsu dm mgenz Zcchiyou 入淫病棟 ～ドSナースで無限絶頂～	Sasagi Mayu	
2018	Is The Island Utopia or Dystopia?	Senpa Kouki	
2018	Koi Wa Mofumofu!!Love Me Teddy	Kusatsu Mei	
2018	I Have Been Summoned To The Different World	Arieal・Lowndes	
2018	Nemureru Sono No Shoujo Tachi	Teacher Nunnally	
2018	Shimojimo No Seikatsu wo Tashinamu Tame No Tsudoi 下々の生活を嗜むための集い	Seijyoubashi Seira	
2019	Ore No Are Ga Seisei Sugite Jyuuhou Sarerun Ga！？ 俺のアレが神聖過ぎて重宝されるんだが！？	Seijyoubashi Seira	
2019	Love Commu らぶこみゅ	Misturu Ikoma	
2019	ai kano アイカノ ～雪空のトライアングル～	Koharu Kazahana	
2019	Is The Prospect Hope or Despair? 抜きゲーみたいな島に住んでる貧乳はどうすりゃいいですか?	Kouki Senpa	
2020	Ama Mama Horikku? あまママほりっく	Nozoki Takasaki	
2020	REAL EROGAME SITUATION!2	Rino Tokitou	
2020	安らぎ香る旅館 ～2人とのユートピア～	綾子	
2020	あまあま★シェアリング	芦野 花恋	
2020	Maitetsu: Last Run まいてつ Last Run!!	西瓜	
2020	隷嬢管理棟 ～制服少女たちの搾乳隷属記～	沖野 舞香	

Online Game
Title	Role	Source
Purigetto+ プリゲット+	Nagamoto Kasumi, Karen	
Ore Wa, Koushoku Ichi Dai Otoko! -Zenkoku Ero Angya- オレは、好色一代男! -全国エロ行脚-	multiple characters	
Big Edo Soup Land	Fuani	
Saint Kureatoru Girls College (Magic School)	Riin, Carol, Licorice, etc.	
JEWEL PRINCESS	Opal, Alexandrite	
Danchi Tsuma Collection	Yukawa Misako	
Open Your Mouth! Tooth brushing Weather	Nishijima Hareran	
Moe Mahjong	Mirai Anzu	
Senran Princess	Fujiwarano Hidehira	

== Radio Personality ==
Year	Title	Source
2018	《音泉》Presentsダミーヘッドマイクであなたの耳と心を幸せにしたいラジオ	
2018-present	耳かきマッドサイエンティスト伊ヶ崎がダミヘで世界征服を目論むラジオ|耳かきマッドサイエンティスト伊ヶ崎がダミヘで世界征服を目論むラジオ。	

== Discography ==
Year	Album	Track	Song	Source
2016	Goodbye, Friend	5	clover	
2018	ave;new Project	8	癒し?イヤラシ☆これって何ナニ！？ -CHUりぃミックCHU-	
