= Ayako Nakano (dancer) =

Japanese ballerina (born 1977)

Ayako Nakano (中野綾子, Nakano Ayako; born in 1977) is a Japanese ballerina.

== Career ==
- Studied at the Royal Ballet School in England from 1992.
- Joined Zürcher Ballett in 1994.
- Joined Tanz-Forum Köln as a soloist in 1996.
- Joined Euregio Tanz-Forum as a soloist in 1998.
- Joined Staatstheater Saarbrücken as a soloist in 1999.
- Joined Berlin Ballett as a soloist in 2000.
- Joined Theater Basel as a soloist in 2001.

== Awards and honours ==
- 3rd Prize in the Junior Class at the 1991 Asian Pacific International Ballet Competition.
- Won the Scholarship prize of Prix de Lausanne (the International dance competition in Lausanne) in 1992.
