= Ayano =

- Gender: Female

Origin
- Origin: Japanese
- Meaning: Different meanings depending on the kanji used

Ayano (written: 彩乃, 綾乃, 絢野, 綾野 or 亜弥乃) is both a feminine Japanese given name and a surname. Notable people with the name include:

- Ayano Ahane (亜波根 綾乃; born 1981), Japanese singer-songwriter
- Ayano Dozono (堂園 彩乃; born 1990), Japanese footballer
- Ayano Egami (江上 綾乃; born 1980), Japanese synchronized swimmer
- Ayano Fukuda (福田 彩乃; born 1988), Japanese tarento and impressionist
- Ayano Hamaura (浜浦 彩乃; born 2000), Japanese member from idol group Magnolia Factory
- Ayano Hori (堀 彩乃; born 1993), Japanese women's professional shogi player
- Ayano Ikemitsu (池満 綾乃; born 1991), Japanese long-distance runner
- Ayano Kaneko (カネコアヤノ; born 1993), Japanese singer-songwriter and model
- Ayano Kawamura (川村 文乃; born 1999), Japanese former member from idol group Angerme
- Ayano Kinjou (金城 綾乃; born 1977), Japanese member from pop duo Kiroro
- Ayano Kishi (岸 彩乃; born 1992), Japanese trampolinist
- Ayano Konishi (小西 彩乃; born 1997), Japanese former member from idol group Tokyo Girls' Style
- Ayano Kudo (工藤 綾乃; born 1996), Japanese model and actress
- Ayano Kunimitsu (国光 文乃; born 1979), Japanese politician
- Ayano Masuda (増田 彩乃; born 2003), Japanese member from idol group Cutie Street
- Ayano Nagai (永井 彩乃; born 1997), Japanese rugby union player
- Ayano Nakamura (仲村 綾乃; born 1980), Japanese actress
- Ayano Nakaoji (中大路 絢野; born 1991), Japanese volleyball player
- Ayano Niina (新名 彩乃; born 1988), Japanese voice actress
- Ayano Ninomiya (born 1979), Japanese-American violinist
- Ayano Ōmoto (大本 彩乃; born 1988), Japanese singer and dancer
- Ayano Sakurai (櫻井 綾乃; born 1996), Japanese rugby union player
- Ayano Sato (canoeist) (佐藤 彩乃; born 1996), Japanese slalom canoeist
- Ayano Sato (singer) (佐藤 綾乃; born 1995), Japanese idol
- Ayano Sato (speed skater) (佐藤 綾乃; born 1996), Japanese speed skater
- Ayano Shibuki (渋木 綾乃; born 1941), Japanese volleyball player
- Ayano Shimizu (清水 綾乃; born 1998), Japanese tennis player
- Ayano Tsuji (辻 亜弥乃; born 1978), Japanese singer-songwriter
- Ayano Tsujiuchi (辻内 彩野; born 1996), Japanese Paralympic swimmer
- Ayano Yamada (山田 綾乃; born 1990), Japanese beauty pageant winner
- Ayano Yamamoto (山本 彩乃; born 1986), Japanese actress, voice actress and idol
- Ayano Yamane (山根 綾乃; born 1977), Japanese manga artist
- Ayano-Christie Yoshida (吉田 綾乃 クリスティー; born 1995), Japanese member from idol group Nogizaka46

== Surname ==
- Gō Ayano (綾野 剛; born 1982), Japanese actor
- Mashiro Ayano (綾野 ましろ), Japanese singer
- Mutsuko Ayano (綾野 睦子; 1956–1983), Japanese doctoral student

== Fictional characters ==
- Ayano Aishi, protagonist of the video game Yandere Simulator
- Ayano Hanesaki (羽咲 綾乃), protagonist of the manga series Hanebado!
- Ayano Kannagi, the female protagonist of Kaze no Stigma
- Ayano Kosaka, a character in Code Geass: Akito the Exiled
- Ayano Minegishi, a character from manga and anime, Lucky Star
- Ayano Sugiura, in Yuru Yuri
- Ayano Tateyama, a character from the Vocaloid song series Kagerou Project
- Keiko Ayano (Silica), a character in Sword Art Online
