= Mizukami, Kumamoto =

Mizukami 水上村
- Village
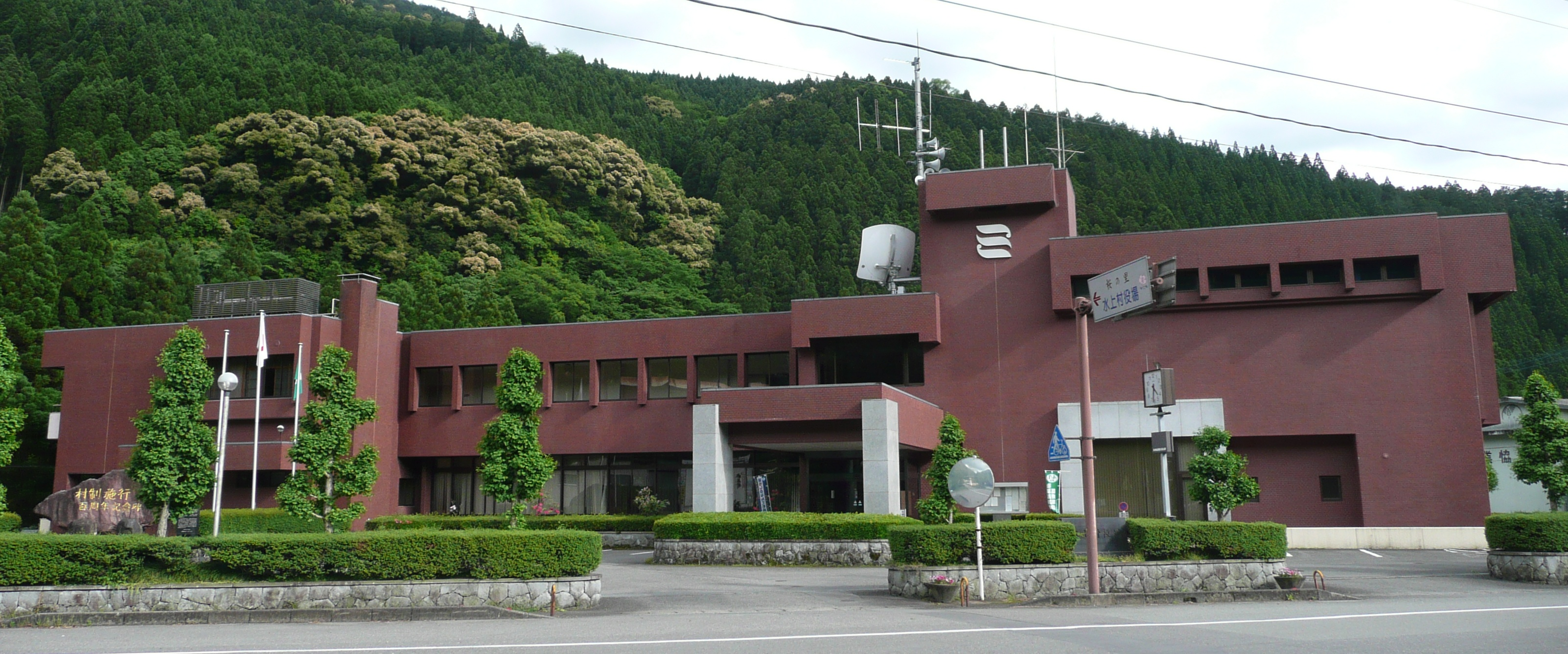
- Mizukami Village Hall

- Flag Chapter
- Interactive map of Mizukami
- Location in Japan
- Coordinates: 32°18′52″N 131°00′34″E
- Country: Japan
- Region: Kyushu
- Prefecture: Kumamoto
- District: Kuma

Area
  - Total: 190.96 km^{2} (73.73 sq mi)

Population (August 31, 2024)
  - Total: 1,946
  - Density: 10.19/km^{2} (26.39/sq mi)
- Time zone: UTC+09:00 (JST)
- City hall address: 90 Iwano, Minakami-mura, Kuma-gun, Kumamoto-ken 868-0795
- Website: Official website
- Symbols
- Bird: Wagtail
- Flower: Rhododendron
- Tree: Cryptomeria japonica

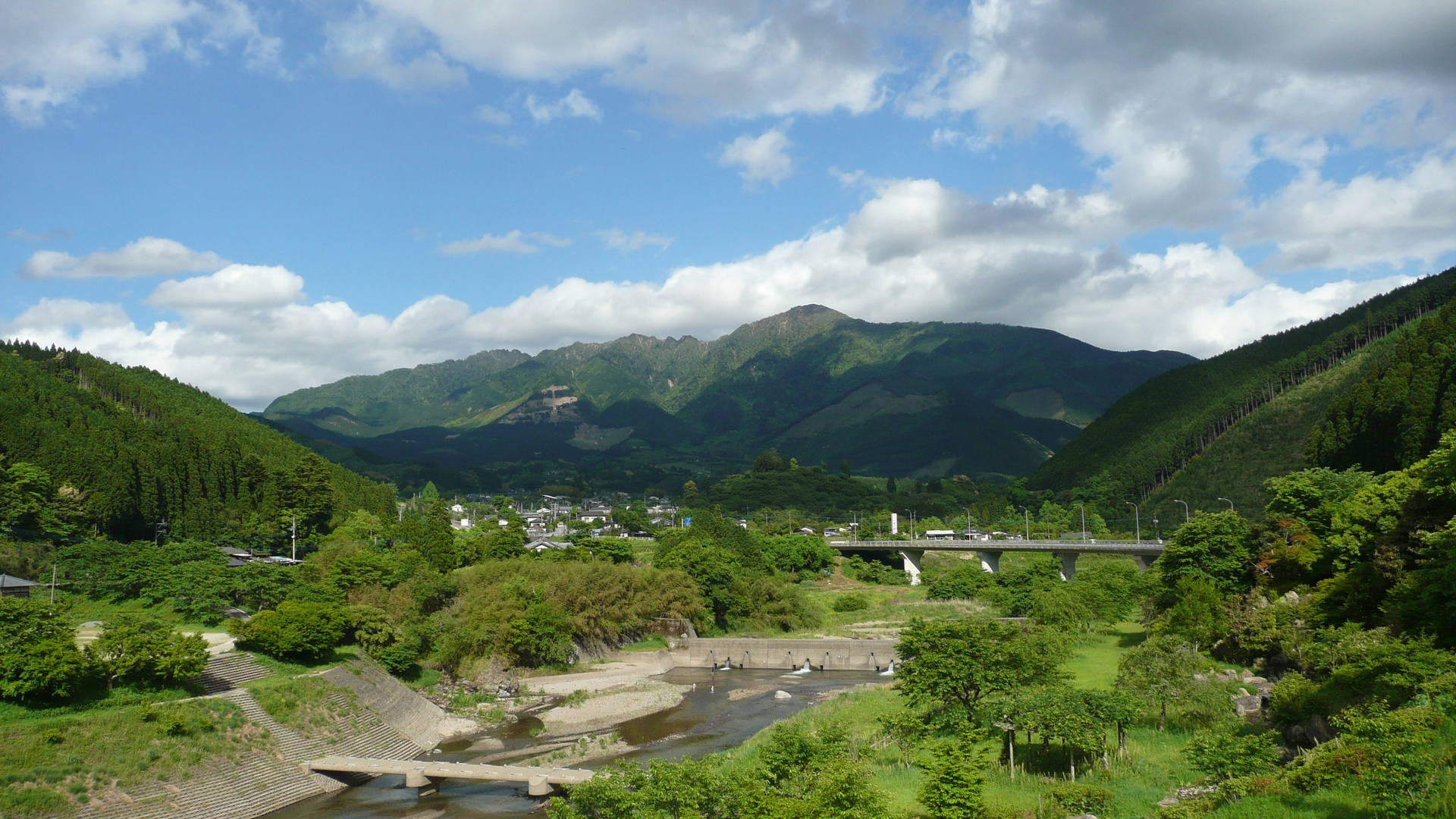
Ichifusayama from Mizukami Kumamoto

Mizukami (水上村, Mizukami-mura) is a village located in Kuma District, Kumamoto Prefecture, Japan. As of 31 August 2024, the village had an estimated population of 1,946 in 839 households, and a population density of 10 persons per km^{2}. The total area of the village is 190.96 km^{2} (73.73 sq mi).

== Geography ==
Mizukami is located at the easternmost tip of the Kyushu Mountains and Hitoyoshi Basin, in southeast Kumamoto. The entire area is mountainous and forested.

=== Neighboring municipalities ===
Kumamoto Prefecture

- Itsuki
- Taragi
- Yatsushiro
- Yunomae

Miyazaki Prefecture

- Nishimera
- Shiiba

=== Climate ===
Mizukami has a humid subtropical climate (Köppen Cfa) characterized by warm summers and cool winters with light to no snowfall.

=== Demographics ===
Per Japanese census data, the population of Mizukami is as shown below

Historical population
Year	Pop.	±%
1940	5,553	—
1950	6,944	+25.0%
1960	5,896	−15.1%
1970	4,410	−25.2%
1980	3,668	−16.8%
1990	3,115	−15.1%
2000	2,706	−13.1%
2010	2,405	−11.1%
2020	2,033	−15.5%

== History ==
The area of Mizukami was part of ancient Higo Province, During the Edo Period it was part of the holdings of Hitoyoshi Domain. After the Meiji restoration, the villages of Yuyama, Iwano and Edai were established with the creation of the modern municipalities system on April 1, 1889. These three villages merged to form the village of Mizukami on November 1, 1895.

== Government ==
Mizukami has a mayor-council form of government with a directly elected mayor and a unicameral village council of eight members. Mizukami, collectively with the other municipalities of Kuma District, contributes two members to the Kumamoto Prefectural Assembly. In terms of national politics, the village is part of the Kumamoto 4th district of the lower house of the Diet of Japan.

== Economy ==
The local economy is based on agriculture and forestry.

== Education ==
Mizukami has one combined public elementary/junior high school operated by the village government. The village does not have a high school.

== Transportation ==
=== Railways ===
Mizukami has no passenger railway services. The nearest train stations is Yunomae Station on the Kumagawa Railway Yunomae Line in neighboring Yunomae.

=== Highways ===
- National Route 388
- National Route 446
