= Itsuki, Kumamoto =

Itsuki 五木村
- Village
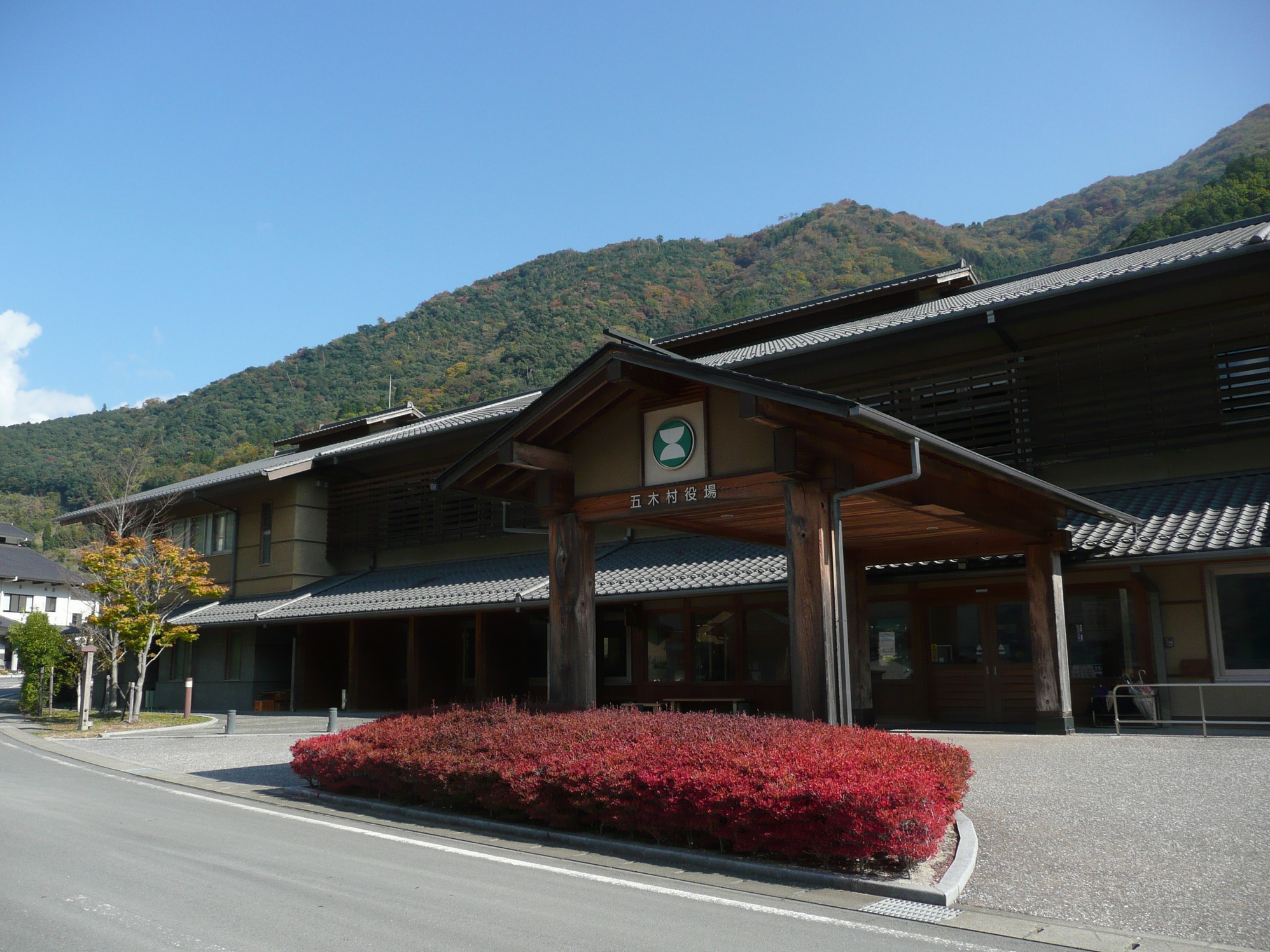
- Itsuki Village Hall

- Flag Emblem
- Interactive map of Itsuki
- Location in Japan
- Coordinates: 32°23′50″N 130°49′40″E
- Country: Japan
- Region: Kyushu
- Prefecture: Kumamoto
- District: Kuma

Area
  - Total: 252.92 km^{2} (97.65 sq mi)

Population (August 31, 2024)
  - Total: 937
  - Density: 3.70/km^{2} (9.60/sq mi)
- Time zone: UTC+09:00 (JST)
- City hall address: 2672-7 Shimo-te, Itsuki-mura, Kuma-gun, Kumamoto-ken 868-0201
- Website: Official website
- Symbols
- Bird: Japanese white-eye
- Flower: Camellia
- Tree: Ginkgo biloba

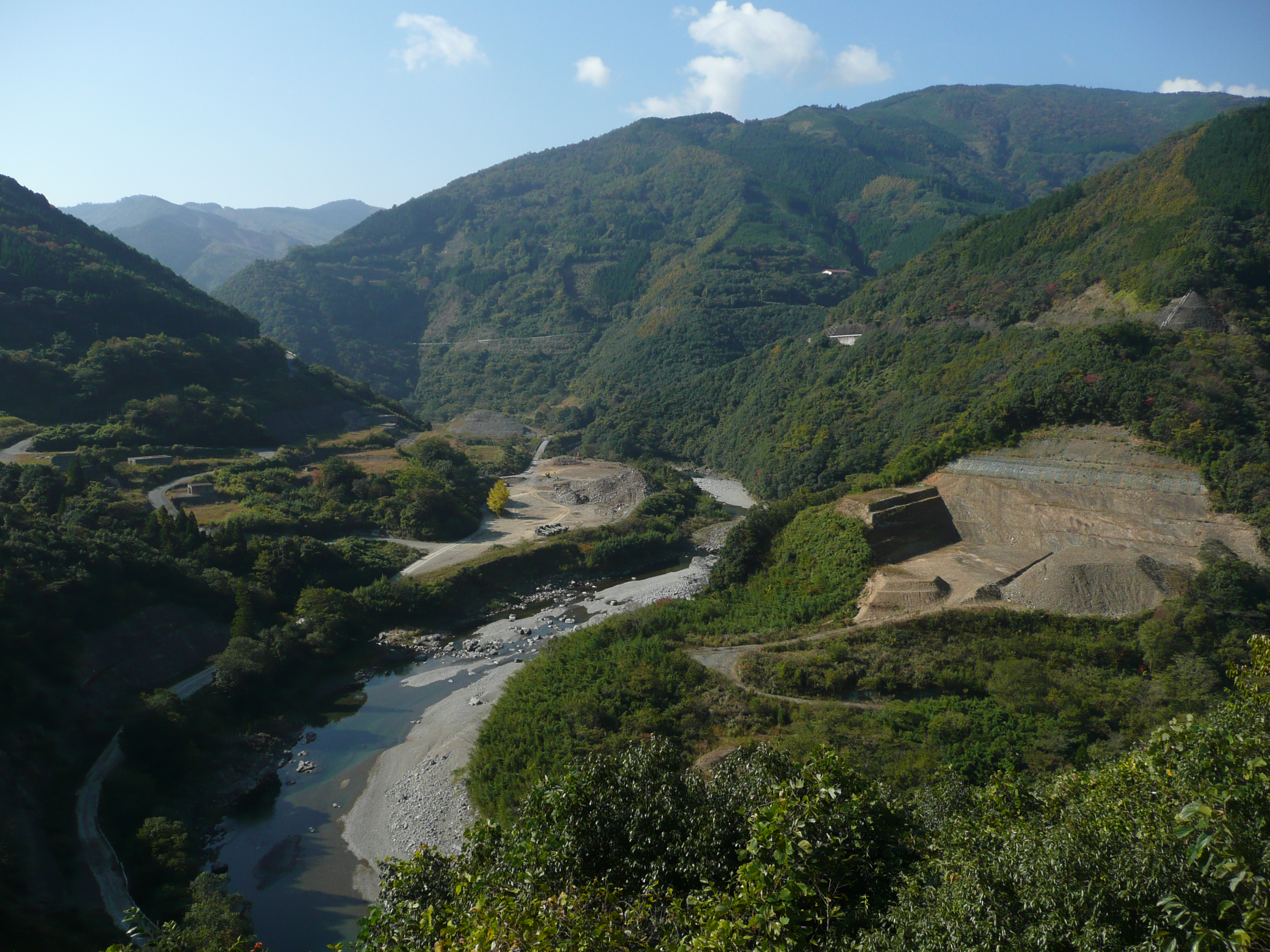
Site of Kawabe Dam

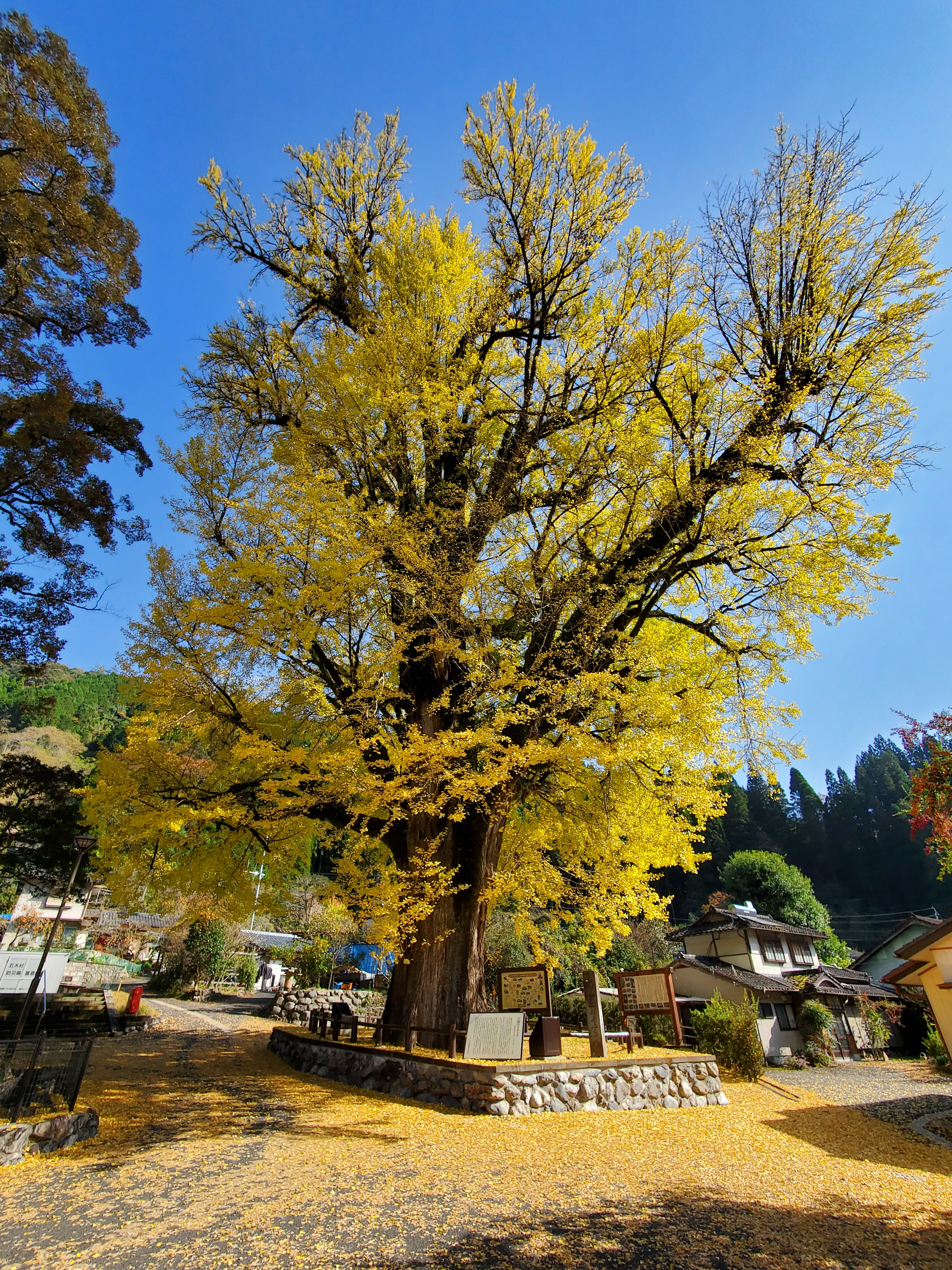
Miyazono Ginkgo Tree

Itsuki (五木村, Itsuki-mura) is a village located in Kuma District, Kumamoto Prefecture, Japan. As of 31 August 2024, the village had an estimated population of 937 in 466 households, and a population density of 3.7 persons per km^{2}. The total area of the village is 252.92 km^{2} (97.65 sq mi). The name of Itsuki is well known for an indigenous folksong Itsuki no Komoriuta, or Lullaby of Itsuki.

== Geography ==
Itsuki is located in the southern part of Kumamoto Prefecture, in the northern part of Kuma District. The entire village is in the mountainous region of the Kyushu Mountains, so it is characterized by a series of mountains over 1,000 meters above sea level, very few flat areas, and steep terrain with deep gorges running vertically and horizontally. Approximately 96.2% of the total area is made up of forests. Almost all of the habitable areas in the village, including the urban center, are scheduled to be submerged by the Kawabegawa Dam, so alternative sites were built in various places and residents have been gradually relocated.

=== Neighboring municipalities ===
Kumamoto Prefecture

- Mizukami
- Sagara
- Taragi
- Yamae
- Yatsushiro

=== Climate ===
Itsuki has a humid subtropical climate (Köppen Cfa) characterized by warm summers and cool winters with light to no snowfall.

=== Demographics ===
Per Japanese census data, the population of Itsuki is as shown below

Historical population
Year	Pop.	±%
1940	6,179	—
1950	5,902	−4.5%
1960	6,161	+4.4%
1970	4,006	−35.0%
1980	3,086	−23.0%
1990	1,964	−36.4%
2000	1,530	−22.1%
2010	1,205	−21.2%
2020	931	−22.7%

== History ==
The area of Itsuki was part of ancient Higo Province, During the Edo Period it was part of the holdings of Hitoyoshi Domain. After the Meiji restoration, the village of Itsuki was established with the creation of the modern municipalities system on April 1, 1889. A plan for constructing Kawabegawa Dam was promulgated in 1966, but was delayed for decades due to extensive opposition by villagers and environmentalists. This project was cancelled in 2008, but only after most buildings and houses in the village were demolished and rebuilt on higher ground. However, after heavy rains in 2020 caused great damage in the Kuma River basin and other areas, the project was revived under the guise of "flood control", with construction now scheduled to commence in 2027 with completion by 2035.

== Government ==
Itsuki has a mayor-council form of government with a directly elected mayor and a unicameral village council of eight members. Itsuki, collectively with the other municipalities of Kuma District, contributes two members to the Kumamoto Prefectural Assembly. In terms of national politics, the village is part of the Kumamoto 4th district of the lower house of the Diet of Japan.

== Economy ==
The local economy is based on agriculture and forestry. Production of green tea is the primary crop.

== Education ==
Itsuki has one public elementary school and one public junior high school operated by the village government, and one public high school operated by the Kumamoto Prefectural Bureau of Education.

== Transportation ==
=== Railways ===
Itsuki has no passenger railway services. The nearest train stations is Hitoyoshi Station on the Kumagawa Railway or JR Kyushu, approximately 45 minutes away by car or bus.

Hitoyoshi Station (45 minutes by car, or buses available) or Arisa Station (45 minutes by car).

=== Highways ===
- National Route 445
