= Nishimera, Miyazaki =

Nishimera 西米良村
- Village
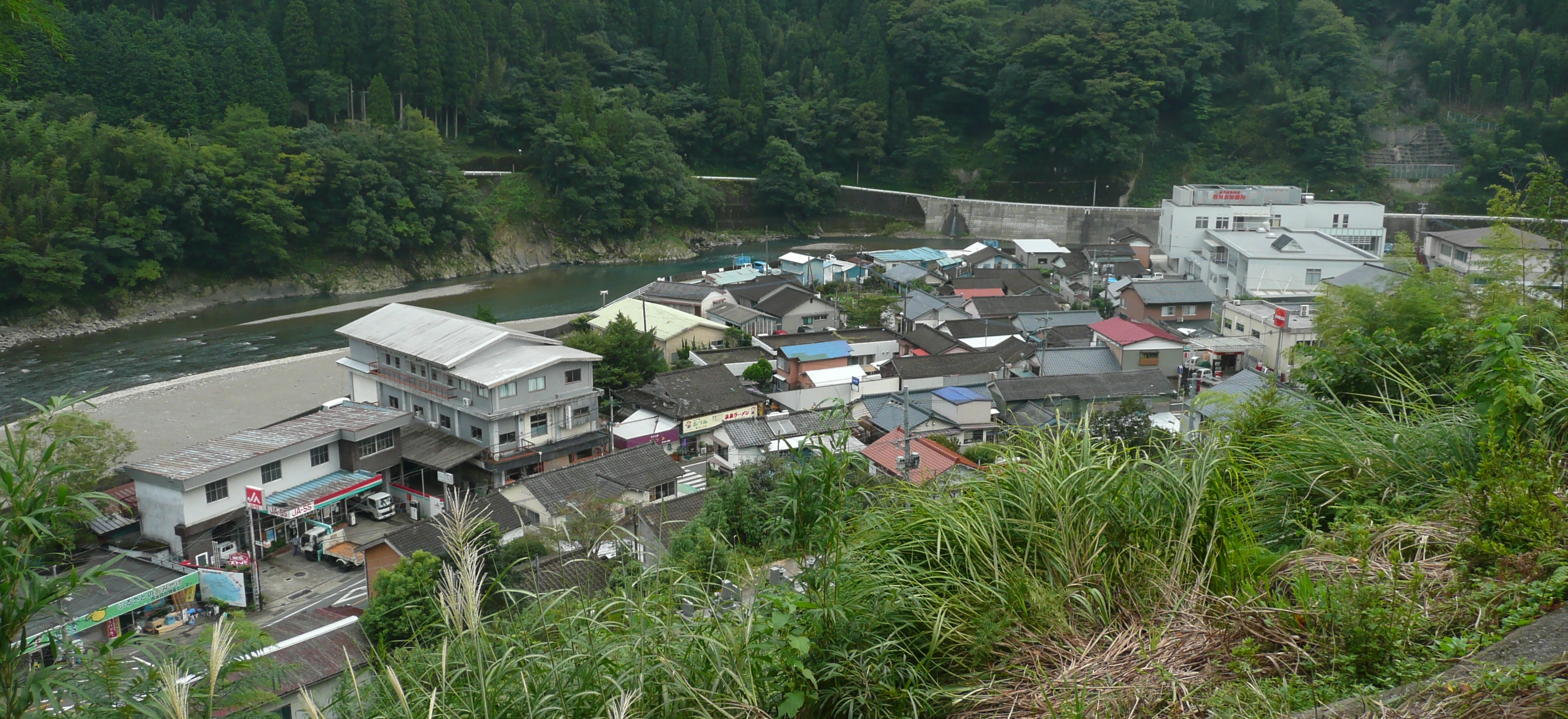
- Nishimera Village

- Flag Chapter
- Location of Nishimera in Miyazaki Prefecture

- Location in Japan
- Coordinates: 32°13′35″N 131°9′16″E
- Country: Japan
- Region: Kyushu
- Prefecture: Miyazaki
- District: Koyu

Area
  - Total: 271.51 km^{2} (104.83 sq mi)

Population (October 1, 2023)
  - Total: 1,040
  - Density: 3.83/km^{2} (9.92/sq mi)
- Time zone: UTC+09:00 (JST)
- City hall address: 15 Murasho, Nishimera-son, Koyu-gun, Miyazaki-ken 881-1411
- Climate: Cfa
- Website: Official website
- Symbols
- Bird: Warbling white-eye
- Flower: Sakura
- Tree: Japanese umbrella pine

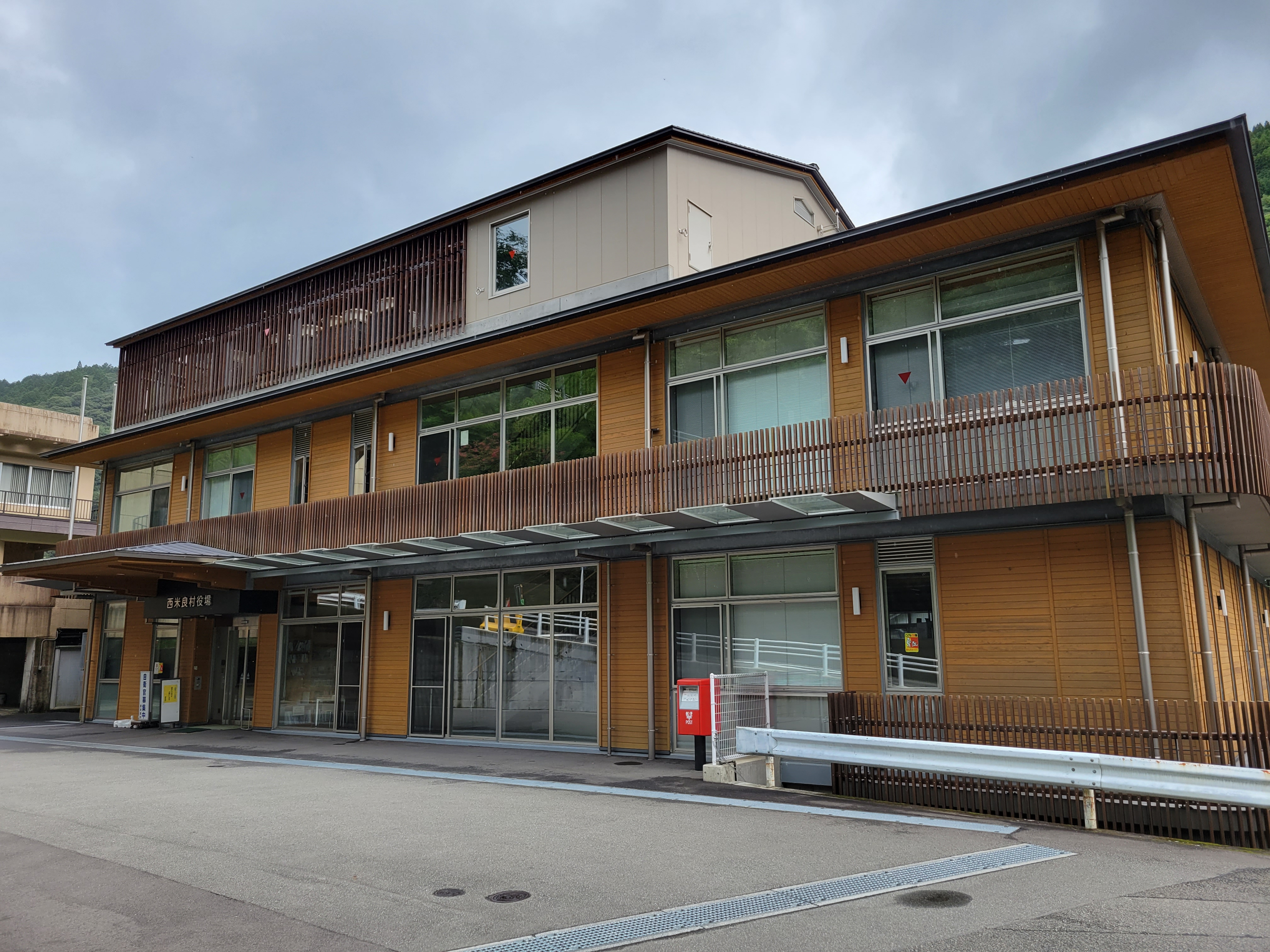
Nishimera Village Office

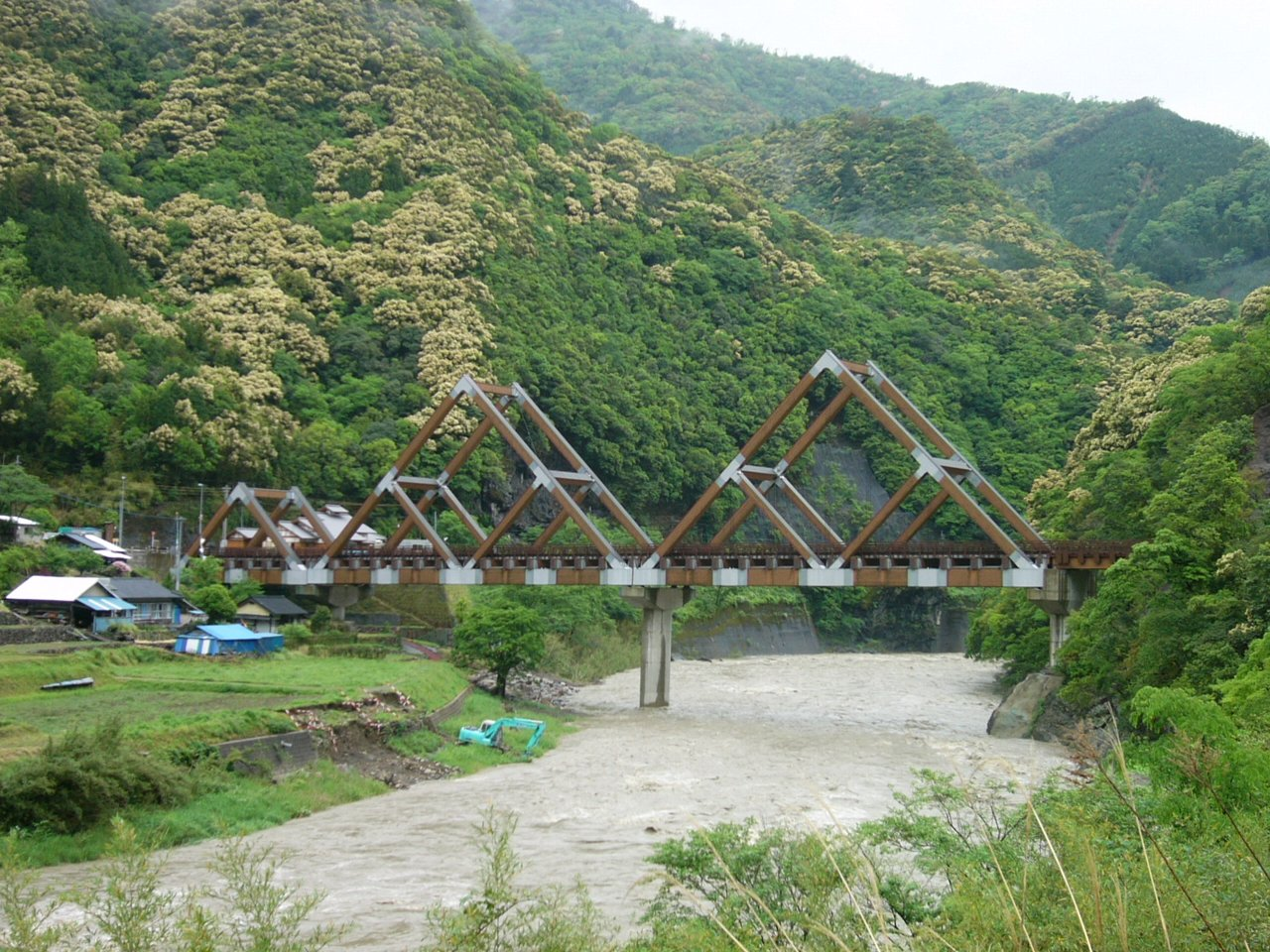
Karikobouzu Bridge

Nishimera (西米良村, Nishimera-son) is a village located in Koyu District, Miyazaki Prefecture, Japan. As of 1 October 2023, the village had an estimated population of 1,040 in 533 households, and a population density of 3.8 persons per km^{2}. The total area of the village is 271.51 square kilometres (104.83 sq mi).

== Geography ==
Nishimera is an inland village located in the central western part of Miyazaki Prefecture, with 96% of its area covered by mountains and forest. It is made up of the hamlets of Murasho, Ogawa, Koshino, Yokono, Takehara, Kanmera, and Itaya.

=== Neighbouring municipalities ===
Kumamoto Prefecture

- Mizukami
- Taragi
- Yunomae

Miyazaki Prefecture

- Aya
- Kobayashi
- Kunitomi
- Saito
- Shiiba

=== Climate ===
Nishimera has a humid subtropical climate (Köppen climate classification Cfa) with hot, humid summers and cool winters. The average annual temperature in Nishimera is 15.4 °C (59.7 °F). The average annual rainfall is 3,035.9 mm (119.52 in) with June as the wettest month. The temperatures are highest on average in August, at around 25.6 °C (78.1 °F), and lowest in January, at around 4.9 °C (40.8 °F). The highest temperature ever recorded in Nishimera was 39.7 °C (103.5 °F) on 17 August 2020; the coldest temperature ever recorded was −8.2 °C (17.2 °F) on 15 January 1985.

Climate data for Nishimera (1991−2020 normals, extremes 1979−present)
Month	Jan	Feb	Mar	Apr	May	Jun	Jul	Aug	Sep	Oct	Nov	Dec	Year
Record high °C (°F)	21.2 (70.2)	24.2 (75.6)	27.0 (80.6)	31.5 (88.7)	33.9 (93.0)	35.1 (95.2)	39.3 (102.7)	39.7 (103.5)	36.4 (97.5)	33.2 (91.8)	27.3 (81.1)	22.2 (72.0)	39.7 (103.5)
Mean daily maximum °C (°F)	11.1 (52.0)	12.9 (55.2)	16.5 (61.7)	21.4 (70.5)	25.3 (77.5)	26.5 (79.7)	30.8 (87.4)	31.5 (88.7)	28.8 (83.8)	24.2 (75.6)	18.4 (65.1)	13.0 (55.4)	21.7 (71.1)
Daily mean °C (°F)	4.9 (40.8)	6.4 (43.5)	9.8 (49.6)	14.4 (57.9)	18.5 (65.3)	21.4 (70.5)	25.1 (77.2)	25.6 (78.1)	22.8 (73.0)	17.6 (63.7)	11.9 (53.4)	6.6 (43.9)	15.4 (59.7)
Mean daily minimum °C (°F)	0.2 (32.4)	1.3 (34.3)	4.5 (40.1)	8.8 (47.8)	13.3 (55.9)	17.8 (64.0)	21.4 (70.5)	21.9 (71.4)	18.9 (66.0)	13.0 (55.4)	7.2 (45.0)	1.9 (35.4)	10.9 (51.5)
Record low °C (°F)	−8.2 (17.2)	−7.8 (18.0)	−5.5 (22.1)	−2.2 (28.0)	3.6 (38.5)	8.0 (46.4)	13.3 (55.9)	14.8 (58.6)	7.5 (45.5)	1.6 (34.9)	−3.7 (25.3)	−6.9 (19.6)	−8.2 (17.2)
Average precipitation mm (inches)	75.0 (2.95)	116.3 (4.58)	167.0 (6.57)	172.9 (6.81)	232.3 (9.15)	581.7 (22.90)	545.3 (21.47)	393.5 (15.49)	414.8 (16.33)	166.1 (6.54)	91.9 (3.62)	79.3 (3.12)	3,035.9 (119.52)
Average precipitation days (≥ 1.0 mm)	7.4	8.6	12.2	11.2	11.1	17.3	15.5	14.9	12.7	8.2	8.2	7.0	134.3
Mean monthly sunshine hours	161.4	144.4	163.4	174.0	168.8	105.9	146.7	157.1	129.6	163.3	148.4	161.3	1,824.1
Source: Japan Meteorological Agency

== Demographics ==
Per Japanese census data, the population of Nishimera in 2020 is 1,000 people. Nishimera has been conducting censuses since 1920.

Historical population

Year	Pop.	±%
1920	4,909	—
1925	4,754	−3.2%
1930	4,762	+0.2%
1935	5,259	+10.4%
1940	7,583	+44.2%
1945	5,134	−32.3%
1950	5,195	+1.2%
1955	5,839	+12.4%
1960	5,586	−4.3%
1965	4,107	−26.5%
1970	3,422	−16.7%

Year	Pop.	±%
1975	2,624	−23.3%
1980	2,153	−17.9%
1985	1,989	−7.6%
1990	1,694	−14.8%
1995	1,543	−8.9%
2000	1,480	−4.1%
2005	1,307	−11.7%
2010	1,241	−5.0%
2015	1,089	−12.2%
2020	1,000	−8.2%

Nishimera population statistics

== History ==
The area of Nishimera was part of ancient Hyūga Province. In the early 15th century, the Mera clan, who are said to be descendants of the Kikuchi clan, moved to the area and ruled 14 villages surrounding Mount Mera, constructing Ogawa Castle in present-day Ogawa, hamlet as their stronghold. The area came under the control of Hitoyoshi Domain during the Genna era (1615-1624) and remained part of that domain to the Meiji restoration of 1871. In 1872, it was transferred to Koyu District in Mimitsu Prefecture (predecessor of Miyazaki Prefecture). Due to this historical background, the Mera region has stronger ties with the Kuma region of Kumamoto Prefecture (Higo Province) than other regions of Miyazaki Prefecture. With the creation of the modern municipalities system on May 1, 1889, the villages of Nishimera a Higashimera were created. Higashimera was incorporated into Saito city and Kijo town in 1962 when the Hitotsuse Dam was constructed, but the borders of Nishimera remain as established in 1889.

== Government ==
Nishimera has a mayor-council form of government with a directly elected mayor and a unicameral village council of eight members. Nishimera, collectively with the city of Saito contributes one member to the Miyazaki Prefectural Assembly. In terms of national politics, the village is part of the Miyazaki 2nd district of the lower house of the Diet of Japan.

== Economy ==
The main industry of Nishimera is agriculture and forestry. The main crop is the growing of Yuzu citrus fruit.

== Education ==
Nishimera has one public elementary school and one public junior high school operated by the village government. The village does not have a high school.

== Transportation ==
=== Railways ===
Nishimera has no passenger rail service. The nearest train station is Yunomae on the Kumagawa Railway. On the JR Kyushu Nippō Main Line, the nearest stations are Takanabe or Miyazaki.

=== Highways ===
The Higashikyushu Expressway and the Kyushu Expressway pass through the village, but there is no interchange.

- National Route 219
- National Route 265

== Sister cities ==
Nishimera is twinned with:

- Kikuchi, Kumamoto, Japan
- Tōno, Iwate, Japan
