= Yamae, Kumamoto =

Yamae 山江村
- Village
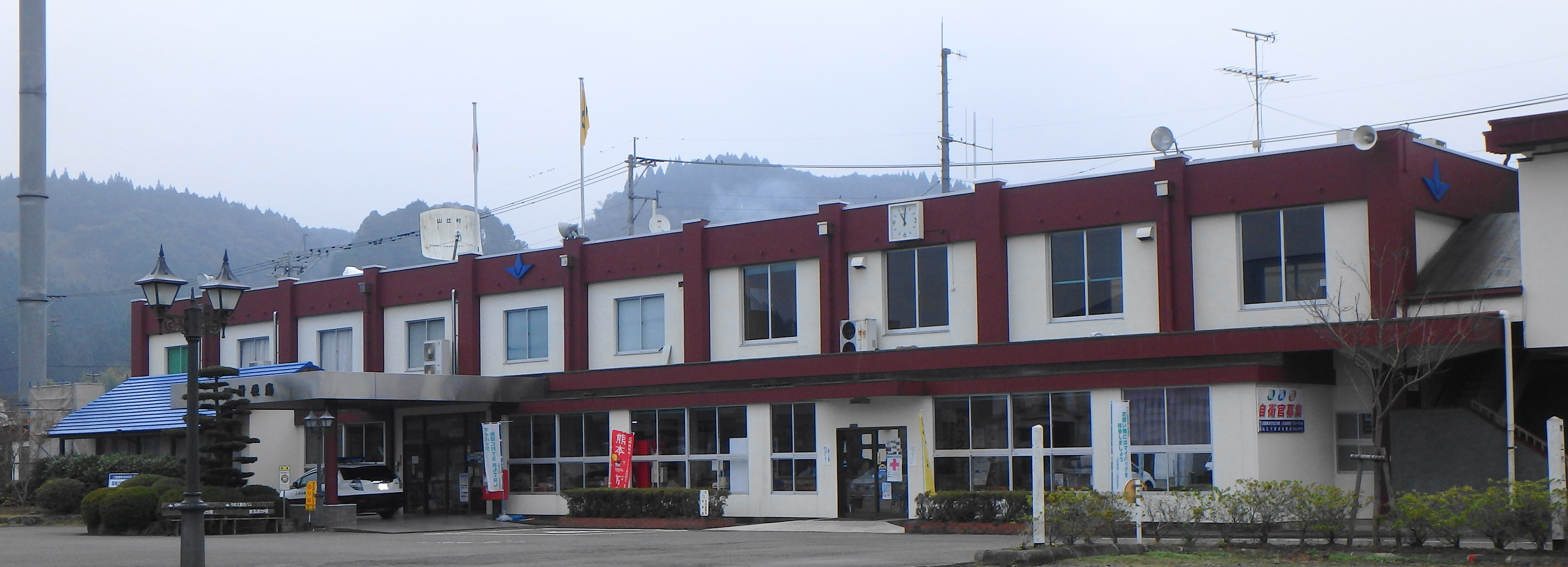
- Yamane Village Hall

- Flag Seal
- Location of Yamae in Kumamoto Prefecture

- Location in Japan
- Coordinates: 32°14′48″N 130°46′00″E
- Country: Japan
- Region: Kyushu
- Prefecture: Kumamoto
- District: Kuma

Area
  - Total: 121.19 km^{2} (46.79 sq mi)

Population (August 31, 2024)
  - Total: 3,177
  - Density: 26.22/km^{2} (67.90/sq mi)
- Time zone: UTC+09:00 (JST)
- City hall address: 1356-1 Yamada-ko, Yamae-mura, Kuma-gun, Kumamoto-ken 868-0092
- Website: Official website
- Symbols
- Bird: Warbling white-eye
- Flower: Azalea
- Tree: Cryptomeria japonica

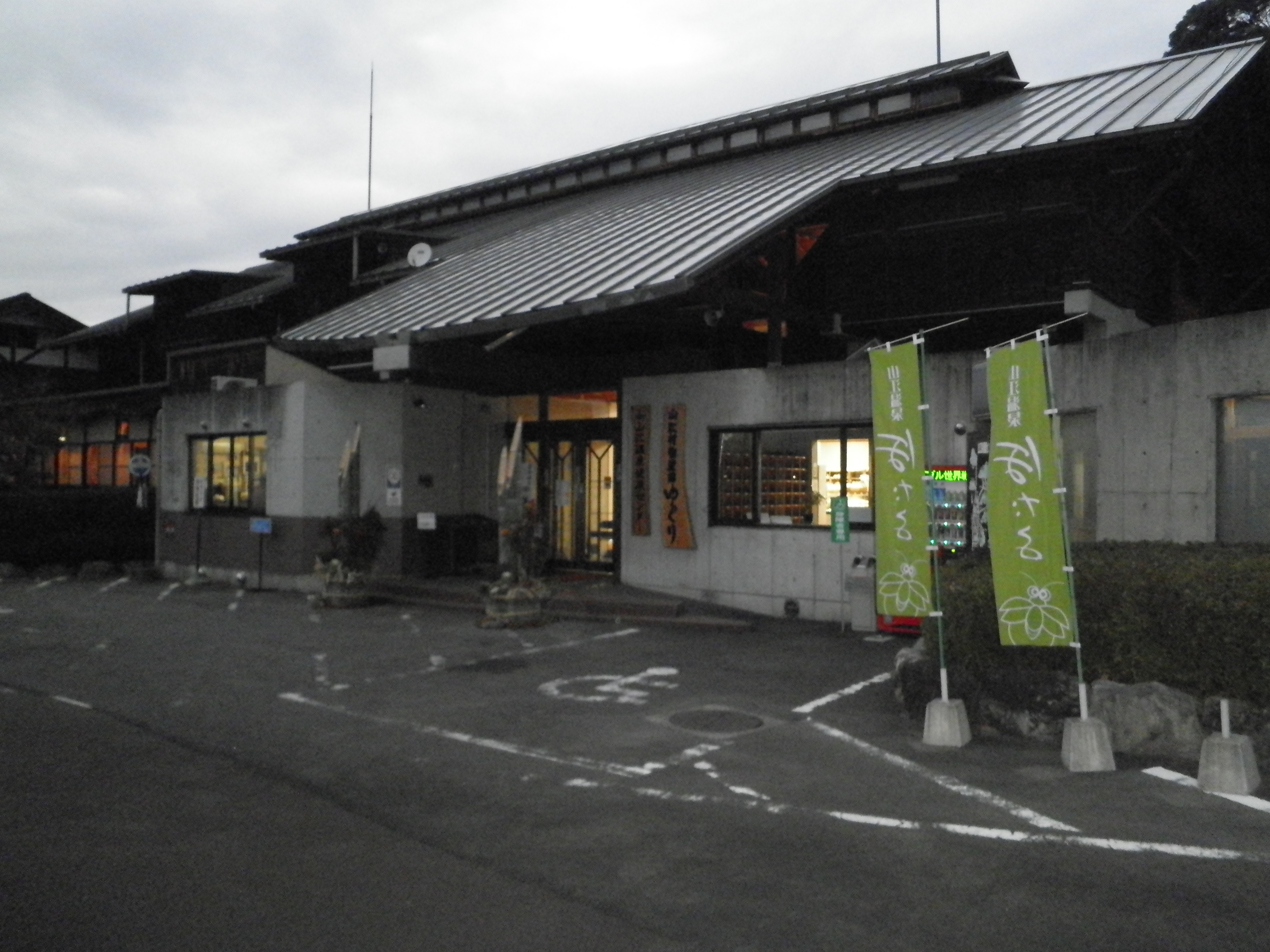
Yamae onsen

Yamae (山江村, Yamae-mura) is a village located in Kuma District, Kumamoto Prefecture, Japan. As of 31 August 2024, the village had an estimated population of 3,177 in 1194 households, and a population density of 26 persons per km^{2}. The total area of the village is 121.19 km^{2} (46.79 sq mi).

== Geography ==
Yamae is located in an inland region of southern Kumamoto prefecture. The southern part of the village is part of the Hitoyoshi Basin, which is contains the central urban area. The remainder, which accounts for 90% of the village area, is mountainous.

=== Neighboring municipalities ===
Kumamoto Prefecture

- Hitoyoshi
- Itsuki
- Kuma
- Sagara
- Yatsushiro

=== Climate ===
Yamae has a humid subtropical climate (Köppen Cfa) characterized by warm summers and cool winters with light to no snowfall. The average annual temperature in Yamae is 14.5 °C. The average annual rainfall is 2283 mm with September as the wettest month. The temperatures are highest on average in August, at around 24.9 °C, and lowest in January, at around 3.5 °C.

=== Demographics ===
Per Japanese census data, the population of Yamane is as shown below

Historical population
Year	Pop.	±%
1940	5,272	—
1950	6,051	+14.8%
1960	6,633	+9.6%
1970	4,765	−28.2%
1980	4,276	−10.3%
1990	4,237	−0.9%
2000	4,104	−3.1%
2010	3,681	−10.3%
2020	3,238	−12.0%

== History ==
The area of Yamae was part of ancient Higo Province, During the Edo Period it was part of the holdings of Hitoyoshi Domain. After the Meiji restoration, the village of Yamane was established with the creation of the modern municipalities system on April 1, 1889.

== Government ==
Yamane has a mayor-council form of government with a directly elected mayor and a unicameral village council of eight members. Yamane, collectively with the other municipalities of Kuma District, contributes two members to the Kumamoto Prefectural Assembly. In terms of national politics, the village is part of the Kumamoto 4th district of the lower house of the Diet of Japan.

== Economy ==
The local economy is based on agriculture and forestry.

== Education ==
Yamane has two public elementary school sand one public junior high school operated by the village government. The village does not have a high school.

== Transportation ==
=== Railways ===
Yamae has no passenger railway services. The nearest train stations is Hitoyoshi Station on the Kumagawa Railway or JR Kyushu, approximately 45 minutes away by car or bus.

=== Highways ===
- Kyushu Expressway: Yamae SA - Hitoyoshi IC
- National Route 445
