= Yunomae, Kumamoto =

Yunomae 湯前町
- Town
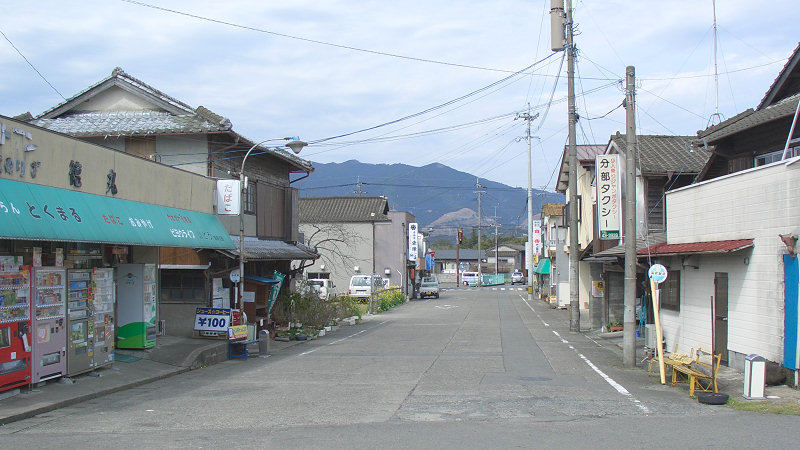
- Yunomae station

- Flag Chapter
- Location of Yunomae in Kumamoto Prefecture

- Location in Japan
- Coordinates: 32°16′34″N 130°58′51″E
- Country: Japan
- Region: Kyushu
- Prefecture: Kumamoto
- District: Kuma

Area
  - Total: 48.41 km^{2} (18.69 sq mi)

Population (August 31, 2024)
  - Total: 3,475
  - Density: 71.78/km^{2} (185.9/sq mi)
- Time zone: UTC+09:00 (JST)
- City hall address: 1989-1 Yunomae-cho, Kuma-gun, Kumamoto-ken 868-0621
- Website: Official website
- Symbols
- Bird: Warbling white-eye
- Flower: Azalea
- Tree: Hinoki Cypress

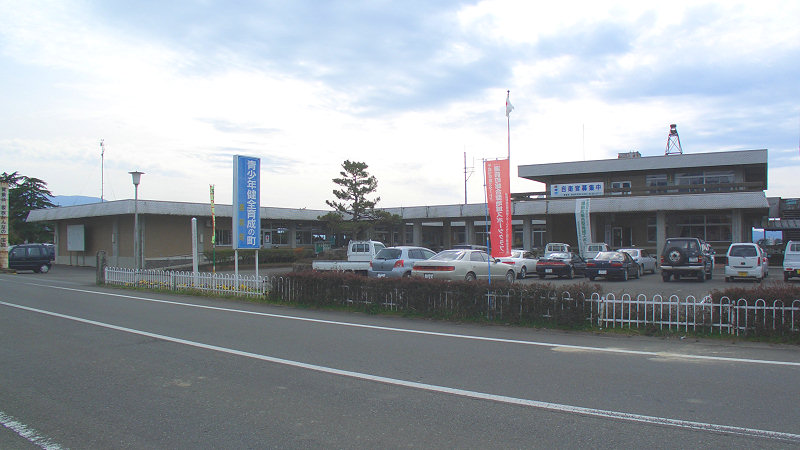
Yunomae town hall

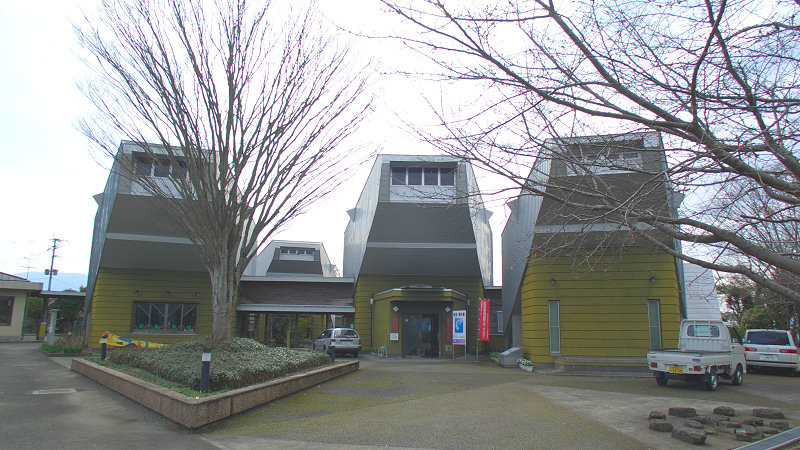
Yunomae Manga Museum

Yunomae (湯前町, Yunomae-machi) is a town located in Kuma District, Kumamoto Prefecture, Japan. As of 31 August 2024, the town had an estimated population of 3,475 in 1515 households, and a population density of 860 persons per km^{2}. The total area of the town is 48.41 km^{2} (18.69 sq mi).

== Geography ==
Yunomae is located in the southeastern corner of Kumamoto Prefecture, about 80 kilometers south-southeast in a straight line from Kumamoto City (about 110 km by road), and about 24 kilometers east-northeast from Hitoyoshi City. The western part of the town, which is the urban center, is at the eastern edge of the Hitoyoshi Basin (Kuma Basin). The eastern and southern parts of the town occupy a corner of the Kyushu Mountains and have a steep topography.

=== Neighboring municipalities ===
Kumamoto Prefecture

- Mizukami
- Taragi

Miyazaki Prefecture

- Nishimera

=== Climate ===
Yunomae has a humid subtropical climate (Köppen Cfa) characterized by warm summers and cool winters with light to no snowfall. The average annual temperature in Yunomae is 14.0 °C. The average annual rainfall is 2328 mm with September as the wettest month. The temperatures are highest on average in August, at around 24.5 °C, and lowest in January, at around 2.9 °C.

=== Demographics ===
Per Japanese census data, the population of Yunomae is as shown below

Historical population
Year	Pop.	±%
1940	5,899	—
1950	8,499	+44.1%
1960	8,622	+1.4%
1970	6,634	−23.1%
1980	6,038	−9.0%
1990	5,514	−8.7%
2000	5,018	−9.0%
2010	4,375	−12.8%
2020	3,627	−17.1%

== History ==
The area of Yunomae was part of ancient Higo Province, During the Edo Period it was part of the holdings of Hitoyoshi Domain. After the Meiji restoration, the village of Yunomae was established with the creation of the modern municipalities system on April 1, 1889. It was raised to town status on April 1, 1937.

== Government ==
Yunomae has a mayor-council form of government with a directly elected mayor and a unicameral town council of ten members. Yunomae, collectively with the other municipalities of Kuma District, contributes two members to the Kumamoto Prefectural Assembly. In terms of national politics, the town is part of the Kumamoto 4th district of the lower house of the Diet of Japan.

== Economy ==
The local economy is largely based on agriculture and forestry.

== Education ==
Yunomae has one public elementary school and one public junior high schools operated by the town government. The town does not have a high school.

== Transportation ==
=== Railways ===
Kumagawa Railroad - Yunomae Line

- Yunomae

=== Highways ===
- National Route 219
- National Route 388
- National Route 446

== Notable people from Yunomae ==
- Takeo Nakahara
