= Taragi, Kumamoto =

Taragi 多良木町
- Town
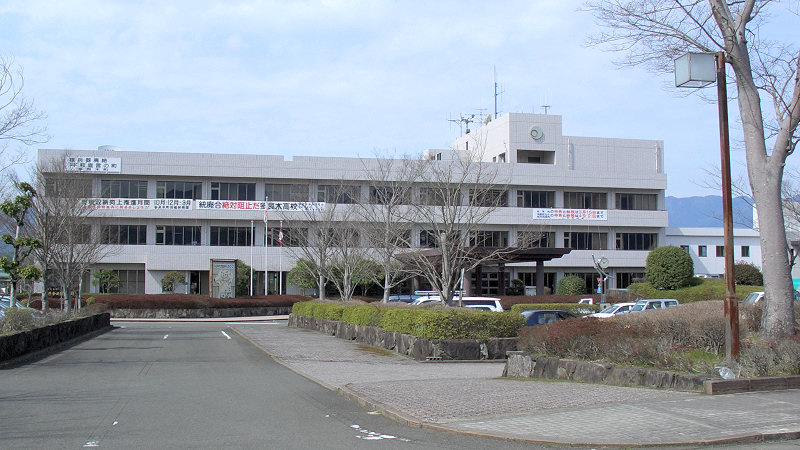
- Taragi Town Hall

- Flag Seal
- Location of Taragi in Kumamoto Prefecture

- Location in Japan
- Coordinates: 32°15′51″N 130°56′09″E
- Country: Japan
- Region: Kyushu
- Prefecture: Kumamoto
- District: Kuma

Area
  - Total: 165.86 km^{2} (64.04 sq mi)

Population (August 31, 2024)
  - Total: 8,200
  - Density: 49/km^{2} (130/sq mi)
- Time zone: UTC+09:00 (JST)
- Website: Official website
- Symbols
- Flower: Azalea
- Tree: Zelkova serrata

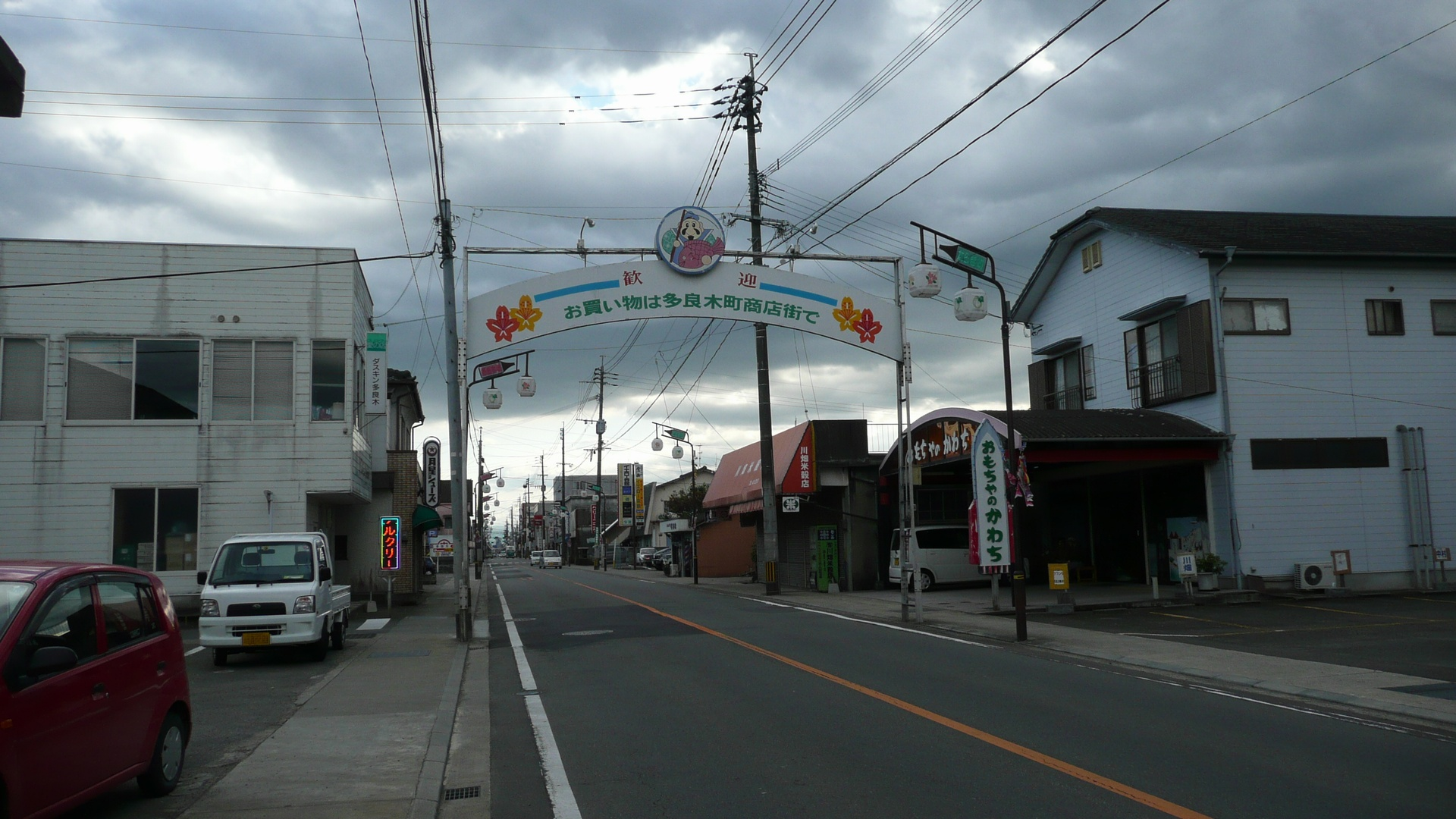
Route 219 in Taragi

Taragi (多良木町, Taragi-machi) is a town located in Kuma District, Kumamoto Prefecture, Japan.As of 31 August 2024, the town had an estimated population of 8,200 in 3212 households, and a population density of 49 persons per km^{2}. The total area of the town is 165.86 km^{2} (64.04 sq mi).

== Geography ==
Taragi is located in the southeastern edge of Kumamoto Prefecture, about 70 kilometers southeast of Kumamoto City (about 100 km by road). The southeastern and southern parts of the town border Miyazaki Prefecture. The urban center is part of the Hitoyoshi Basin and is relatively flat, but the rest of the area is part of the Kyushu Mountains and has many mountains and forests. The Kuma River flows from east to west slightly north of the centre of the town.

=== Neighboring municipalities ===
Kumamoto Prefecture

- Asagiri
- Itsuki
- Mizukami
- Sagara
- Yunomae

Miyazaki Prefecture

- Kobayashi
- Nishimera

=== Climate ===
Taragi has a humid subtropical climate (Köppen Cfa) characterized by warm summers and cool winters with light to no snowfall. The average annual temperature in Taragi is 14.0 °C. The average annual rainfall is 2328 mm with September as the wettest month. The temperatures are highest on average in August, at around 24.3 °C, and lowest in January, at around 3.0 °C.

=== Demographics ===
Per Japanese census data, the population of Arao is as shown below

Historical population
| Year | Pop. | ±% |
|---|---|---|
| 1940 | 14,853 | — |
| 1950 | 19,023 | +28.1% |
| 1960 | 19,958 | +4.9% |
| 1970 | 16,004 | −19.8% |
| 1980 | 14,598 | −8.8% |
| 1990 | 13,437 | −8.0% |
| 2000 | 12,072 | −10.2% |
| 2010 | 10,554 | −12.6% |
| 2020 | 9,076 | −14.0% |

== History ==
The area of Taragi was part of ancient Higo Province, During the Edo Period it was part of the holdings of Hitoyoshi Domain. After the Meiji restoration, the village of Taragi was established with the creation of the modern municipalities system on April 1, 1889. It was raised to town status on May 1, 1926.

== Government ==
Taragi has a mayor-council form of government with a directly elected mayor and a unicameral town council of 12 members. Takagi, collectively with the other municipalities of Kuma District, contributes two members to the Kumamoto Prefectural Assembly. In terms of national politics, the town is part of the Kumamoto 4th district of the lower house of the Diet of Japan.

== Economy ==
The local economy is largely based on agriculture and forestry.

== Education ==
Taragi has four public elementary schools and one public junior high schools operated by the town government, and one public high school operated by the Kumamoto Prefectural Board of Education. The prefecture also operates one special education school for the handicapped.

== Transportation ==
=== Railways ===
Kumagawa Railroad - Yunomae Line

- Kōritsubyōinmae - Taragi - Taragi-Shōrenji - Shin-Tsuruba

=== Highways ===
- National Route 219
