= Asagiri, Kumamoto =

Asagiri あさぎり町
- Town
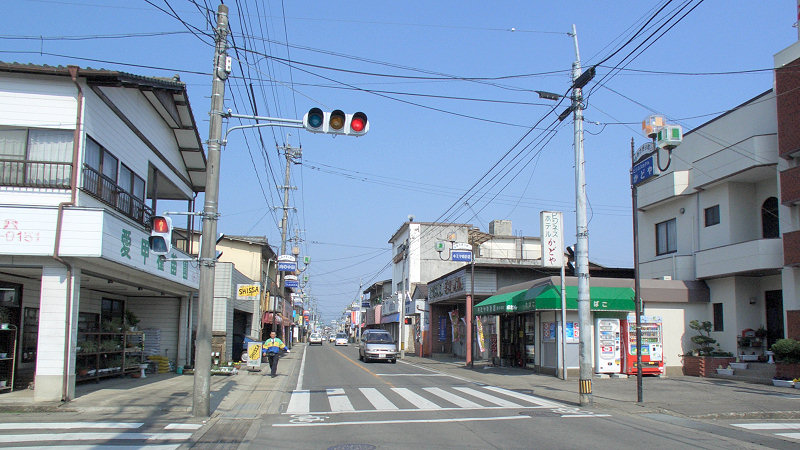
- Asagiri Town

- Flag Emblem
- Interactive map of Asagiri
- Location in Japan
- Coordinates: 32°14′25″N 130°53′52″E
- Country: Japan
- Region: Kyushu
- Prefecture: Kumamoto
- District: Kuma

Area
  - Total: 159.56 km^{2} (61.61 sq mi)

Population (August 31, 2024)
  - Total: 14,134
  - Density: 88.581/km^{2} (229.42/sq mi)
- Time zone: UTC+09:00 (JST)
- City hall address: 1199 Menda Higashi, Asagiri-cho, Kuma-gun, Kumamoto-ken 868-0408
- Climate: Cfa
- Website: Official website
- Symbols
- Bird: Eurasian skylark
- Flower: Ryoukinka (Marsh marigold)
- Tree: Buna (Japanese beech)

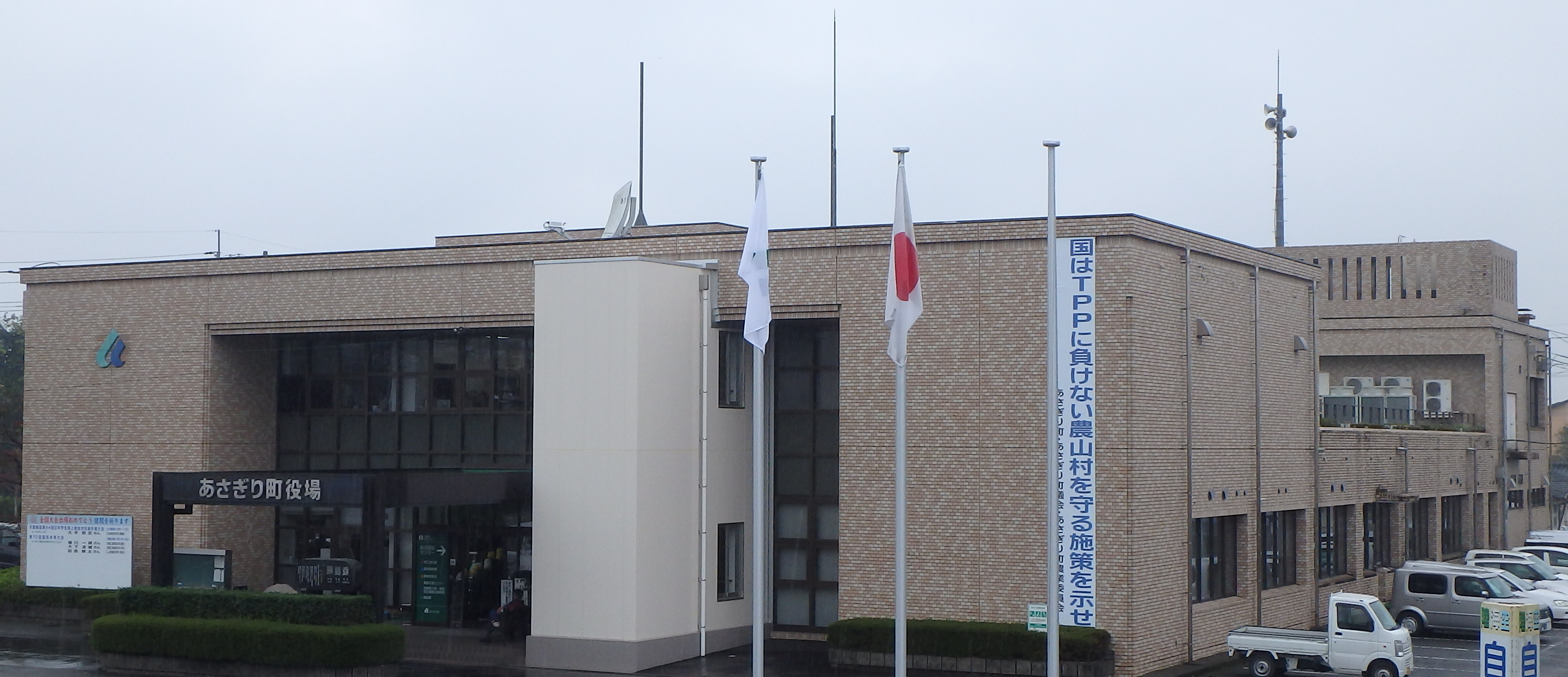
Asagiri Town Hall

Asagiri (あさぎり町, Asagiri-chō) is a town located in Kuma District, Kumamoto Prefecture, Japan. As of 31 August 2024, the town had an estimated population of 14,134 in 5774 households, and a population density of 89 persons per km^{2}. The total area of the town is 159.56 km^{2} (61.61 sq mi). The word "asagiri" translates as "morning mist".

== Geography ==
Asagiri is located in southern Kumamoto Prefecture. It contains Mount Shiragatake, a designated nature reserve.

- Mountains: Shiragatake
- Rivers: Kuma river

=== Adjacent municipalities ===
Kumamoto Prefecture

- Nishiki
- Sagara
- Taragi

Miyazaki Prefecture

- Ebino

=== Climate ===
Asagiri has a humid subtropical climate (Köppen climate classification Cfa) with hot, humid summers and cool winters. There is significant precipitation throughout the year, especially during June and July. The average annual temperature in Asagiri is 15.5 °C (59.9 °F). The average annual rainfall is 2,496.8 mm (98.30 in) with June as the wettest month. The temperatures are highest on average in August, at around 26.4 °C (79.5 °F), and lowest in January, at around 4.1 °C (39.4 °F). The highest temperature ever recorded in Asagiri was 39.2 °C (102.6 °F) on 2 August 2026; the coldest temperature ever recorded was −13.8 °C (7.2 °F) on 25 January 2016.

Climate data for Ue, Asagiri (1991−2020 normals, extremes 1977−present)
Month	Jan	Feb	Mar	Apr	May	Jun	Jul	Aug	Sep	Oct	Nov	Dec	Year
Record high °C (°F)	20.2 (68.4)	23.3 (73.9)	26.9 (80.4)	30.6 (87.1)	34.1 (93.4)	34.7 (94.5)	38.4 (101.1)	39.2 (102.6)	35.8 (96.4)	32.9 (91.2)	26.9 (80.4)	21.6 (70.9)	39.2 (102.6)
Mean daily maximum °C (°F)	10.4 (50.7)	12.5 (54.5)	16.3 (61.3)	21.5 (70.7)	25.8 (78.4)	27.6 (81.7)	31.4 (88.5)	32.3 (90.1)	29.5 (85.1)	24.5 (76.1)	18.2 (64.8)	12.3 (54.1)	21.9 (71.3)
Daily mean °C (°F)	4.1 (39.4)	5.8 (42.4)	9.5 (49.1)	14.4 (57.9)	18.9 (66.0)	22.4 (72.3)	26.0 (78.8)	26.4 (79.5)	23.3 (73.9)	17.5 (63.5)	11.3 (52.3)	5.8 (42.4)	15.5 (59.8)
Mean daily minimum °C (°F)	−1.3 (29.7)	−0.1 (31.8)	3.4 (38.1)	7.9 (46.2)	13.0 (55.4)	18.3 (64.9)	22.1 (71.8)	22.4 (72.3)	18.9 (66.0)	12.1 (53.8)	5.9 (42.6)	0.5 (32.9)	10.3 (50.5)
Record low °C (°F)	−13.8 (7.2)	−10.6 (12.9)	−7.6 (18.3)	−3.4 (25.9)	2.4 (36.3)	8.3 (46.9)	15.0 (59.0)	15.6 (60.1)	6.8 (44.2)	−1.2 (29.8)	−5.8 (21.6)	−8.5 (16.7)	−13.8 (7.2)
Average precipitation mm (inches)	65.5 (2.58)	98.3 (3.87)	144.5 (5.69)	154.5 (6.08)	200.0 (7.87)	558.8 (22.00)	496.5 (19.55)	256.0 (10.08)	248.8 (9.80)	104.5 (4.11)	86.7 (3.41)	73.7 (2.90)	2,496.8 (98.30)
Average precipitation days (≥ 1.0 mm)	7.5	8.9	11.6	10.6	9.8	16.1	14.0	11.6	10.7	7.1	8.3	7.4	123.6
Mean monthly sunshine hours	134.6	140.8	164.3	176.8	175.6	110.2	160.8	180.0	148.9	164.8	128.4	128.6	1,815.4
Source: Japan Meteorological Agency

=== Demographics ===
Per Japanese census data, the population of Asagiri in 2020 is 14,676 people. Asagiri has been conducting censuses since 1920.

Historical population

Year	Pop.	±%
1920	15,365	—
1925	15,868	+3.3%
1930	16,788	+5.8%
1935	17,407	+3.7%
1940	16,986	−2.4%
1945	22,353	+31.6%
1950	23,299	+4.2%
1955	24,161	+3.7%
1960	23,856	−1.3%
1965	21,760	−8.8%
1970	19,910	−8.5%

Year	Pop.	±%
1975	19,141	−3.9%
1980	19,524	+2.0%
1985	19,535	+0.1%
1990	18,968	−2.9%
1995	18,533	−2.3%
2000	17,751	−4.2%
2005	17,300	−2.5%
2010	16,644	−3.8%
2015	15,523	−6.7%
2020	14,676	−5.5%

Asagiri population statistics

== History ==
The area of Asagiri was part of ancient Higo Province, During the Edo Period it was part of the holdings of Hitoyoshi Domain. After the Meiji restoration, the villages of Ue, Minagoe, Menda, Ōkaharu, Sue, and Fukada were established with the creation of the modern municipalities system on April 1, 1889. Minagoe was incorporated into Ue village on December 7, 1895, which was elevated to town status on April 1, 1937. On April 1, 2003, villages of Ue, Ōkaharu, Sue, Fukada were merged with town of Menda to create Asagiri. The name was chosen because for the fog that blankets the valley from fall through spring.(Asa – morning, kiri/giri – fog)

== Government ==
Asagiri has a mayor-council form of government with a directly elected mayor and a unicameral town council of 14 members. Asagiri, collectively with the other municipalities of Kuma District, contributes two members to the Kumamoto Prefectural Assembly. In terms of national politics, the town is part of the Kumamoto 4th district of the lower house of the Diet of Japan.

== Economy ==
Agriculture dominates the local economy. Soybeans, strawberries, melons and tobacco and shōchū are produced here.

== Education ==
Asagiri has five public elementary school and one public junior high school operated by the town government, and one public high school operated by the Kumamoto Prefectural Board of Education.

== Transportation ==
=== Railways ===
Kumagawa Railroad - Yunomae Line

- Okadome-Kōfuku - Asagiri - Higashi-Menda

=== Highways ===
- National Route 219

== Notable people from Asagiri ==
- Yasushi Kaneko, politician
- Kazuaki Kiriya, photographer, video director
- Yoshifumi Matsumura, politician

== In popular culture ==
- The village of Sue (now part of Asagiri) was the topic of a 1939 text, Suye Mura, a Japanese Village by John Embree.
