= Minagoemura =

Former village in Kumamoto Prefecture, Japan

- Village
- Location within Japan
- Country: Japan
- Prefecture: Kumamoto
- District: Kuma

Minagoemura (Japanese: 皆越村, みなごえむら) was a village in the Kumamoto Prefecture, Japan located in the Kuma District. It was established on 1 April 1897 and incorporated into the village of Kamimura (now part of the Asagiri) on 7 December 1895.
