= Sagara, Kumamoto =

Sagara 相良村
- Village
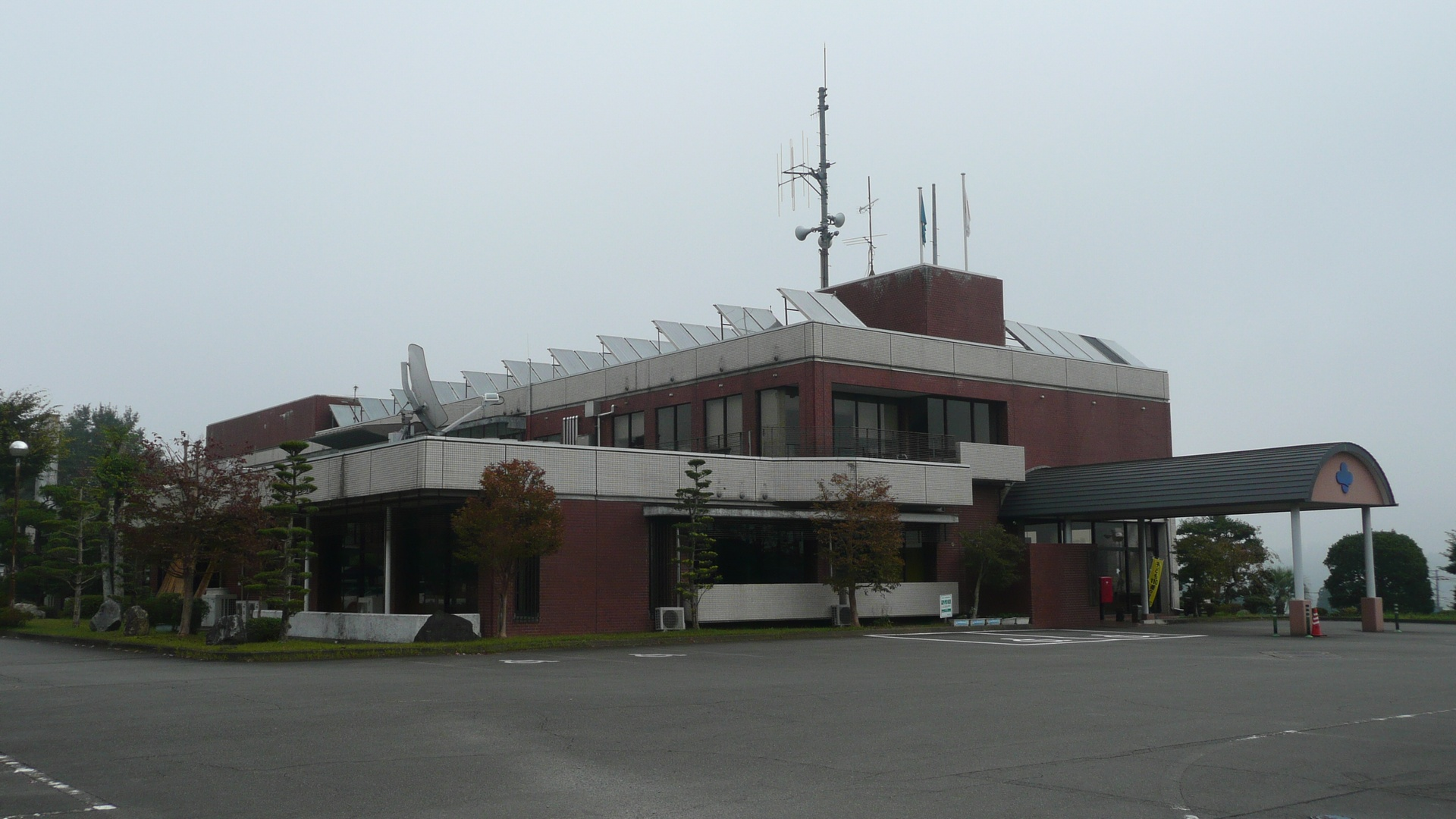
- Sagara Village Hall

- Flag Seal
- Location of Sagara in Kumamoto Prefecture

- Location in Japan
- Coordinates: 32°14′07″N 130°47′52″E
- Country: Japan
- Region: Kyushu
- Prefecture: Kumamoto
- District: Kuma

Area
  - Total: 94.54 km^{2} (36.50 sq mi)

Population (August 31, 2024)
  - Total: 3,987
  - Density: 42.17/km^{2} (109.2/sq mi)
- Time zone: UTC+09:00 (JST)
- City hall address: 2500-1, Fukamizu, Soragamura, Kumamoto-ken 868-0094, Japan
- Website: Official website
- Symbols
- Bird: Wagtail
- Flower: Adonis
- Tree: Camellia sinensis

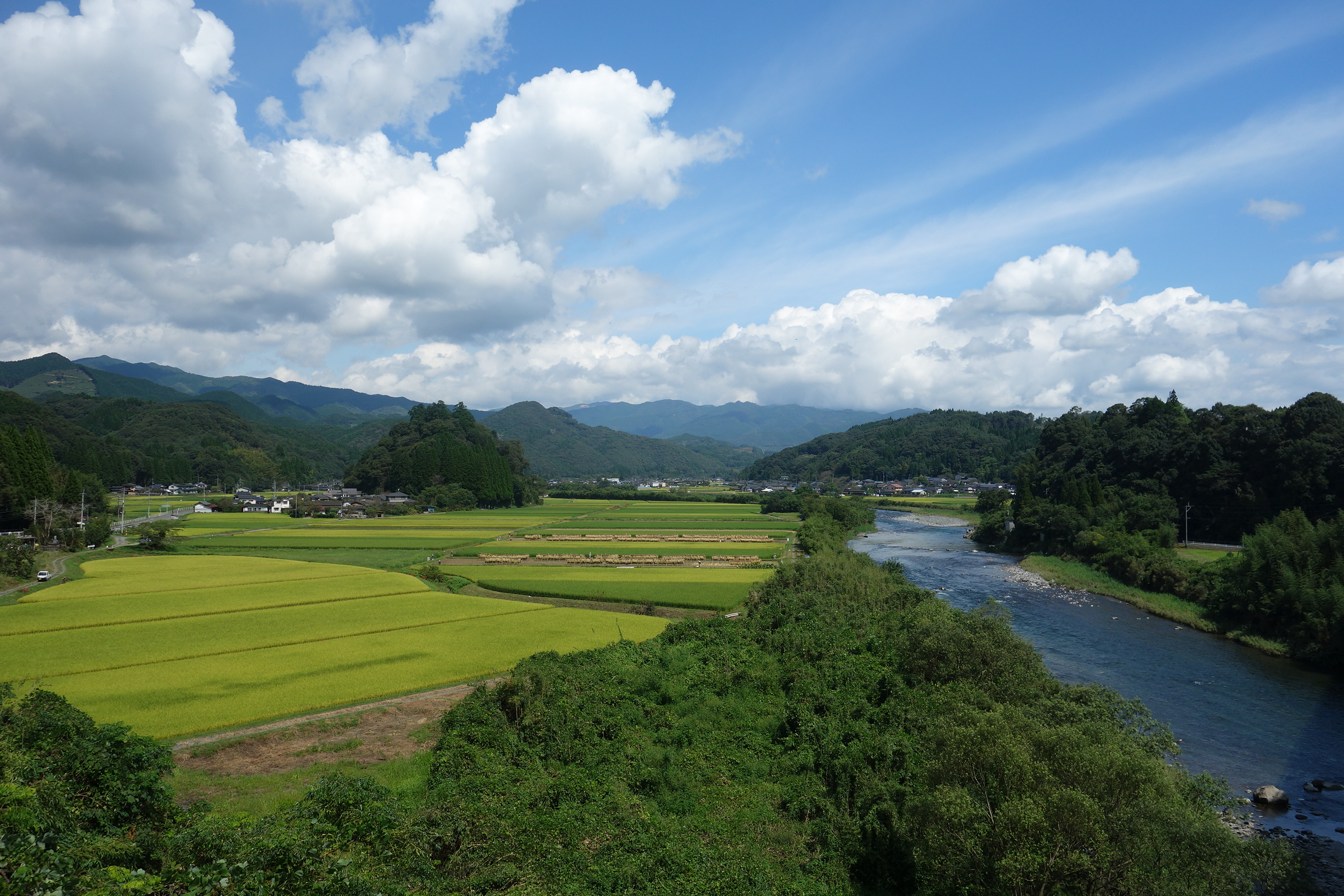
Kawabe River in Sagara

Sagara (相良村, Sagara-mura) is a village located in Kuma District, Kumamoto Prefecture, Japan. located in Kuma District, Kumamoto Prefecture, Japan.

== Population ==
As of 31 August 2024, the village had an estimated population of 3987 in 1589 households, and a population density of 42 persons per km^{2}. The total area of the village is 94.54 km^{2} (36.50 sq mi).

== Geography ==
Sagara is located in the western part of the Hitoyoshi Basin in southern Kumamoto Prefecture. The northern part is mostly mountainous, and the Kawabe River runs through it from north to south.

=== Neighboring municipalities ===
Kumamoto Prefecture

- Asagiri
- Hitoyoshi
- Itsuki
- Nishiki
- Taragi
- Yamae

=== Climate ===
Sagara has a humid subtropical climate (Köppen Cfa) characterized by warm summers and cool winters with light to no snowfall. The average annual temperature in Sagara is 14.5 °C. The average annual rainfall is 2283 mm with September as the wettest month. The temperatures are highest on average in August, at around 24.9 °C, and lowest in January, at around 3.5 °C.

=== Demographics ===
Per Japanese census data, the population of Sagara is as shown below

Historical population
Year	Pop.	±%
1940	6,369	—
1950	5,902	−7.3%
1960	8,830	+49.6%
1970	6,241	−29.3%
1980	5,932	−5.0%
1990	5,941	+0.2%
2000	5,526	−7.0%
2010	4,934	−10.7%
2020	4,070	−17.5%

== History ==
The area of Sagara was part of ancient Higo Province, During the Edo Period it was part of the holdings of Hitoyoshi Domain. After the Meiji restoration, the villages of Kawamura and Youra were established with the creation of the modern municipalities system on April 1, 1889. The town villages merged to form the village of Sagara on September 1, 1956.

== Government ==
Sagara has a mayor-council form of government with a directly elected mayor and a unicameral village council of eight members. Sagara, collectively with the other municipalities of Kuma District, contributes two members to the Kumamoto Prefectural Assembly. In terms of national politics, the village is part of the Kumamoto 4th district of the lower house of the Diet of Japan.

== Economy ==
The local economy is based on agriculture and forestry.

== Education ==
Sagara has two public elementary schools and one public junior high school operated by the village government. The village does not have a high school.

== Transportation ==
=== Railway ===
Kumagawa Railroad - Yunomae Line

Sagara-Toshima

=== Highway ===
- National Route 445

== Sister city relations ==
- - Saint-Valentin, France, since 2017
