= John Embree =

John Fee Embree (August 26, 1908 – December 22, 1950) was an American anthropologist and academic who specialized in the study of Japan. He was a professor at Yale University when he was struck and killed by a motorist.

== Career ==
Born in New Haven, Connecticut, Embree received his Bachelor of Arts from the University of Hawaiʻi in 1931, his Master of Arts from the University of Toronto in 1934 and his Ph.D. from the University of Chicago in 1937. In 1935–36, as part of his doctoral thesis, he conducted field research in a rural area of Kumamoto on the southernmost Japanese island of Kyūshū. The study culminated in the seminal book Suye Mura: A Japanese Village, published in 1939 by the University of Chicago Press. His wife, Ella Lury Embree (later, Wiswell) conducted the research in Suye Mura alongside him, and subsequently published her own ethnographical work on the subject, The Women of Suye Mura.

John Embree served as Professor of Anthropology at the University of Hawaii in 1937–41 and during World War II in 1943–45. He was also associate professor of Anthropology and head of the Japanese area studies of the Civil Affairs Training School for the Far East which the War Department set up at the University of Chicago for the training of military government officers for Japan and the Occupied Areas. He was associate professor of Sociology and Research Associate of Anthropology at Yale from 1948 to 1950 and, later in the year, was appointed the university's Director of Southeast Asia Studies.

== Death ==
John Embree was 42 when, at year's end 1950, he and his only daughter, Clare, were struck and killed by a car in Hamden, Connecticut.

== Books ==
- Suye Mura: A Japanese Village , 1939; in PDF at archive.org
- Acculturation Among the Japanese of Kona, Hawaii, 1941
- The Japanese, 1943
- The Japanese Nation: A Social Survey, 1945
- Ethnology: A Visit to Laos, French Indochina, 1949

As editor:

- Japanese Peasant Songs, compiled and annotated by Embree, with the assistance of Ella Embree and Yukuo Uyehara, 1944
- Bibliography of the Peoples and Cultures of Mainland Southeast Asia with Lillian Ota Dotson, 1950

As commentator:

- Togo-mura, a village in northern Japan by Hideo Nishikiori, translated by Toshio Sano, annotated by John Embree, 1945

Also, based on the author's work:

- Loosely Structured Social Systems: Thailand in Comparative Perspective, edited by Hans-Dieter Evers, 1969, based on Embree's article Thailand - A Loosely Structured Social System, American Anthropologist, 1950
