= Japan National Route 388 =

Road in Japan

National Route 388
- 国道388号

Route information
- Length: 229.4 km (142.5 mi)

Location
- Country: Japan

Highway system
- National highways of Japan; Expressways of Japan
← National Route 387	→ National Route 389

National Route 388 is a national highway of Japan connecting Saiki, Ōita and Yunomae, Kumamoto in Japan, with a total length of 229.4 km (142.54 mi).

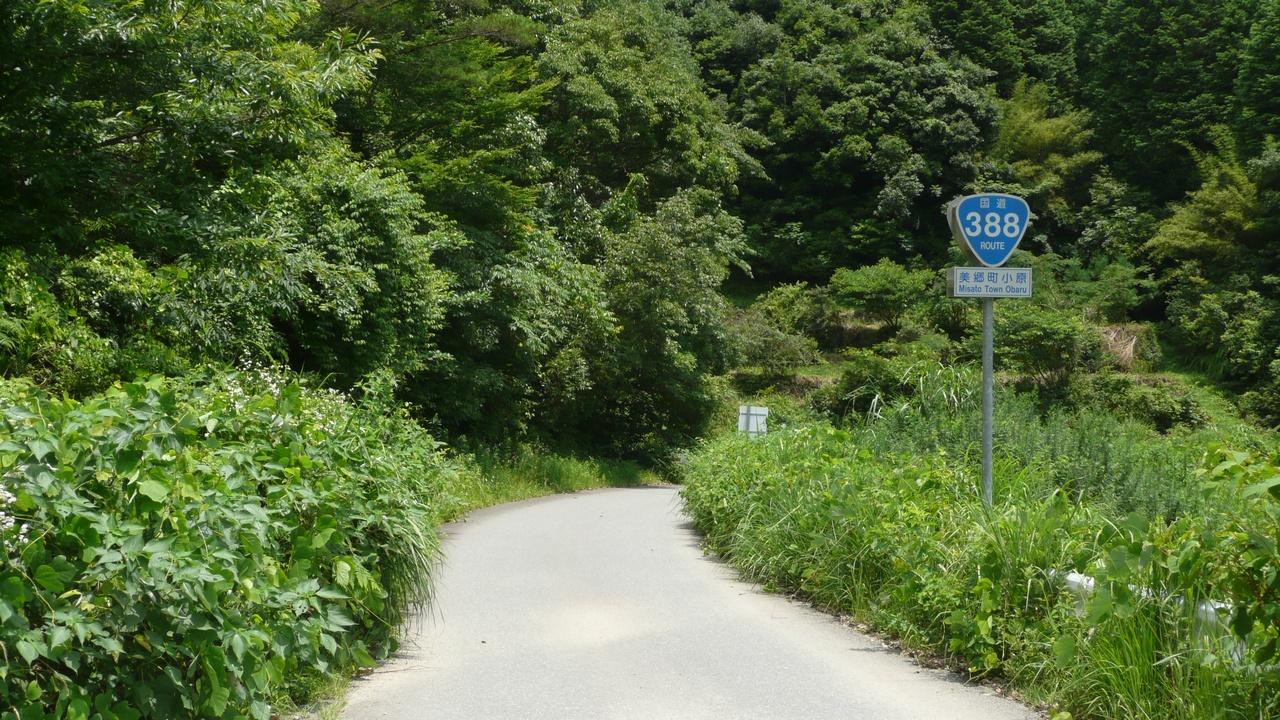
Obaru, Misato Town, Miyazaki

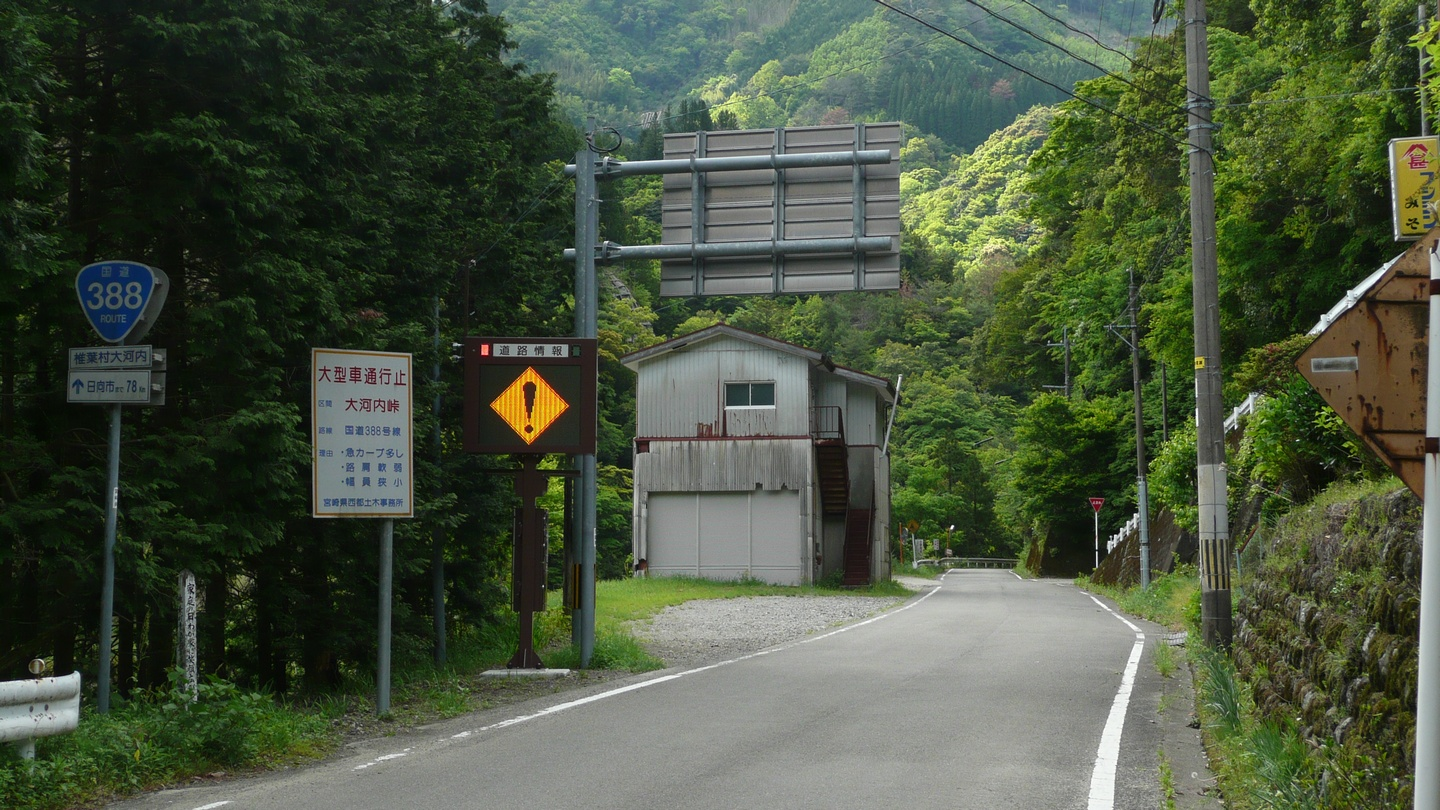
Ōkawachi, Shiiba Village, Miyazaki

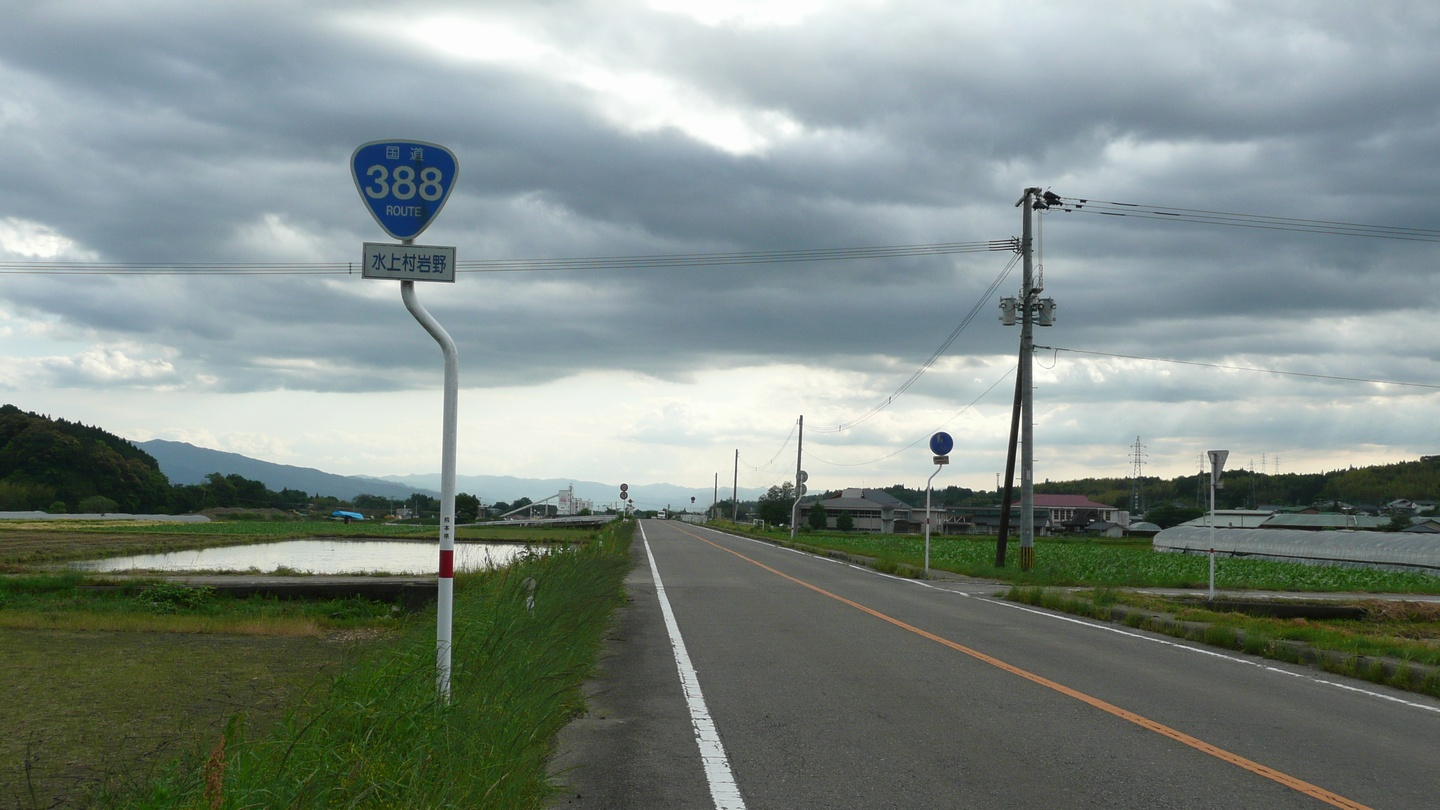
Iwano, Mizukami Village, Kumamoto
