= Japanese beech =

The name Japanese beech can refer to two different species of beech tree, both native to Japan.

- Fagus crenata, also called Siebold's beech, (ブナ, buna in Japanese)
- Fagus japonica, also called Japanese blue beech (イヌブナ, inubuna or kurobuna in Japanese)
