= Yunomae Station =

Train station in Kumamoto Prefecture, Japan

Yunomae Station 湯前駅
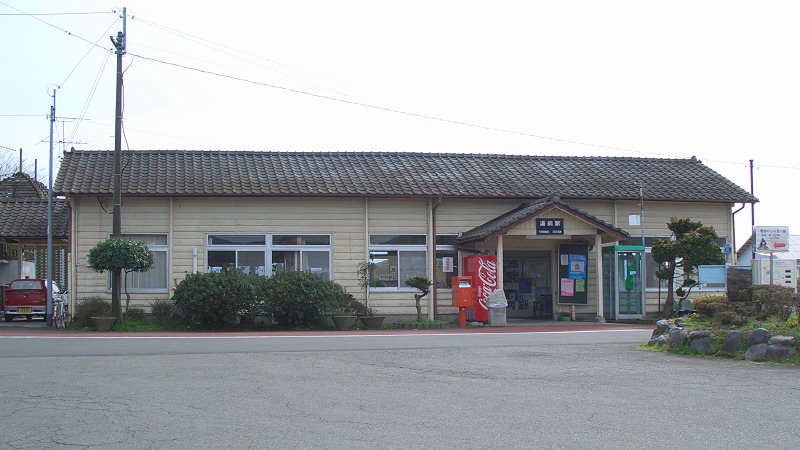

General information
- Location: Yunomae, Kumamoto Prefecture, Japan
- Coordinates: 32°16′51.96″N 130°58′45.12″E
- Operator: Kumagawa Railroad
- Line: ■ Yunomae Line
Location

Yunomae Station (湯前駅, Yunomae-eki) is a Railway station in Yunomae, Kumamoto Prefecture, Japan. Operated by the Kumagawa Railroad, it serves as in the terminus of the Yunomae line. The station opened on 30 March 1924. It woden station building is registered as a Tangible Cultural property of Japan.

HISTORY

Yunomae Stations opened on 30 March 1924 as the terminus of the Japanese Government Railway's Yunomae Line. After the privatization of Japanese National Railways in 1987, the line was transferred to JR Kyushu. On 1 October 1989, operation of the line was transferred to the third-sector Kumagawa Railroad.

The station building dates from the opening of the line in 1924. It was subsequently modified in 1928 and again in 1967. On 19 December 2014, the building was registered as a Tangible Cultural Property of Japan.

Following serves damage caused by the July 2020 floods, railway services on the Kumamawa Railroad were suspended. Train services between Higo-Nishinomura and Yunomae resumedon 28 November 2021, while replacement buses operated on the remaining section. Full railway services between Hitoyoshi-onsen and Yunomae resumed in September 2026.

STATION BUILDING

The statiion has a single-story wooden building with a titled gabled roof and a floor area of about 127 square meters. The exterior retains its original horizontal wooden boarding, while the interior preserves features from the former ticket office. According to the Agency of Cultural Affairs, it is the only station building on the Kumamawa Railroad line that retains its pre-war appearance.

STATION FACILITIES

Yunomae Station has a staffed ticket office and a ticket machine. It is the eastern terminus of the Kumagawa Railroad's Yonomae Line.

SURROUNDING AREA

The station is located near the center of Yunomae, with Yunomae Town Hall and the other public and cultural facilities situared nearby. The Yunomae Manga Museum is located near the station. It displays works by political cartoonist Ryosuke Nasu. who was born in Yunomae.
