= Kuma District, Kumamoto =

District in Kumamoto prefecture, Japan

Coordinates: 32.27°N 130.88°E

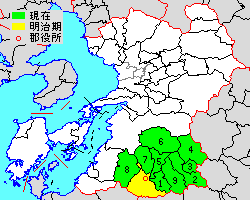
Location of Kuma District in Kumamoto Prefecture

Kuma (球磨郡, Kuma-gun) is a district located in Kumamoto Prefecture, Japan.

In 2003 the district had an estimated population of 64,552 and a density of 48.64 persons per square kilometer. The total area is 1,327.16 km^{2}.

== Economy ==
Kuma District is noted for its many shōchū distilleries.

== Culture ==
A local tradition in Kuma District (as well as other neighboring areas in Kumamoto Prefecture) is the sakazuki (さかずき). At social settings such as a party one presents one's empty cup to a friend to hold, into which one then pours some beverage for the friend to drink. After the friend finishes the drink he returns the glass and fills it with more of the beverage.

=== Language ===
The local dialect is called Kuma-ben. For example, the Japanese word for hot (熱い) is pronounced "atsui" in standard Japanese, but "ats-ka" or "nuka" in Kuma-ben.

== Towns and villages ==
- Asagiri
- Nishiki
- Taragi
- Yunomae
- Itsuki
- Kuma
- Mizukami
- Sagara
- Yamae

== Merger ==
- On April 1, 2003 the town of Menda, and the villages of Fukada, Ōkaharu, Sue and Ue merged to form the new town of Asagiri.
