= Yunomae Line =

Railway line in Kumamoto Prefecture, Japan

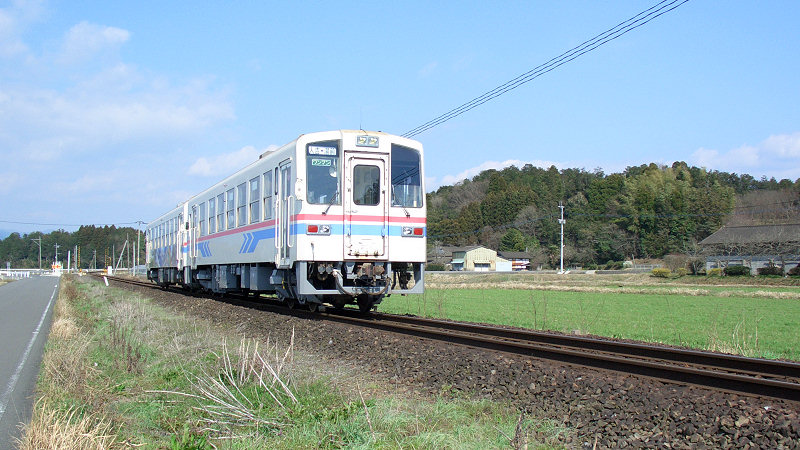

Overview
- Native name: 湯前線
- Owner: Kumagawa Railroad
- Locale: Kumamoto Prefecture, Japan
- Stations: 14

Service
- Type: Heavy rail
- Operator: Kumagawa Railroad

History
- Opened: 1924

Technical
- Line length: 24.8 km
- Number of tracks: Single track
- Electrification: None

The Yunomae Line (湯前線, Yunomae-sen) is a railway line in Kumamoto Prefecture, Japan, connecting Hitoyoshi-Onsen Station in Hitoyoshi and Yunomae Station in Yunomae. It is the only railway line operated by third sector railway company Kumagawa Railroad (くま川鉄道, Kumagawa Tetsudō; lit. 'Kuma River Railroad'). As the company name suggests, the line parallels the Kuma River. The company is also called Kumatetsu (くま鉄). The company took over the former JR Kyushu line in 1989.

== History ==
The entire line was opened by the then Japanese Government Railways in 1924.

Freight services ceased beyond Taragi in 1974, and completely in 1980.

Kumagawa Railroad, a third sector company, took over the line from JR Kyushu in 1989.

On 6 July 2020, all services were suspended until further notice, due to severe damage caused by the rainfall, including the complete destruction of a large bridge over the Kuma River. In May 2021, it was officially announced that the line would be restored as a railway. Restoration work is estimated to cost around 4.6 billion yen, with the national government paying 97.5% of it, with the remaining 2.5% being paid by local governments.

Kumagawa Railway announced on 9 November 2021 the planned resumption of services starting from 28 November 2021 between Yunomae Station and Higo-Nishinomura Station. Trial runs will be conducted between 19 and 21 November, and training runs will be conducted between 22 and 27 November. Services resumed between Yunomae Station and Higo-Nishinomura Station on 28 November 2021.

On 23 March 2026, the company announced that the rest of the line to Hitoyoshi-Onsen Station will resume operations on 20 September 2026, with Kawamura Station being relocated to a different location after the flood and hence renamed Sagara-Toshima and Higashi-Taragi Station renamed to Taragi-Shōrenji.

== Basic data ==
- Distance: 24.8 km / 15.4 mi.
- Gauge: 1,067 mm (3 ft 6 in)
- Stations: 14
- Double-track line: None
- Electric supply: Not electrified
- Railway signalling
  - Hitoyoshi-Onsen – Asagiri: Tablet token
  - Asagiri – Yunomae: Staff token
- Stations with passing loops: 1 (Asagiri Station)

== Stations ==
No.	Station	Japanese	Distance (km)	Notes	Location	
1	Hitoyoshi-Onsen Station	人吉温泉	0.0	formerly Hitoyoshi; Connection to JR Kyushu Hisatsu Line (Hitoyoshi Station)	Hitoyoshi	Kumamoto
2	Sagarahan-Ganjōji Station	相良藩願成寺	1.5	formerly Higashi-Hitoyoshi	Hitoyoshi	Kumamoto
3	Sagara-Toshima Station	相良十島	3.5		Sagara	Kumamoto
4	Higo-Nishinomura Station	肥後西村	5.8		Nishiki	Kumamoto
5	Ichibu Station	一武	9.2		Nishiki	Kumamoto
6	Kinoe Station	木上	11.3		Nishiki	Kumamoto
7	Okadome-Kōfuku Station	おかどめ幸福	13.0		Asagiri	Kumamoto
8	Asagiri Station	あさぎり	15.0	formerly Menda	Asagiri	Kumamoto
9	Higashi-Menda Station	東免田	17.4		Asagiri	Kumamoto
10	Kōritsubyōinmae Station	公立病院前	18.5		Taragi	Kumamoto
11	Taragi Station	多良木	19.8		Taragi	Kumamoto
12	Taragi-Shōrenji Station	多良木青蓮寺	21.7		Taragi	Kumamoto
13	Shin-Tsuruba Station	新鶴羽	23.3		Taragi	Kumamoto
14	Yunomae Station	湯前	24.8		Yunomae	Kumamoto

== Financial situation ==
The company's railway operations have not produced an operating profit since its creation in 1989, and in fiscal 2011, it had operating profit losses of 120.76 million yen.

== Rolling stock ==
As of June 2012, the company operates a fleet of eight diesel cars. With the exception of two tourist trains, these were scheduled to be replaced by five new diesel cars between fiscal 2013 and 2014. The new trains were designed by industrial designer Eiji Mitooka. The new trains are now in service.

All five diesel cars were inundated at Hitoyoshi Onsen Station during torrential rains on 4 July 2020.

== See also ==
- List of railway companies in Japan
- List of railway lines in Japan
