= Kyushu Mountains =

Mountain range in central Kyushu, Japan

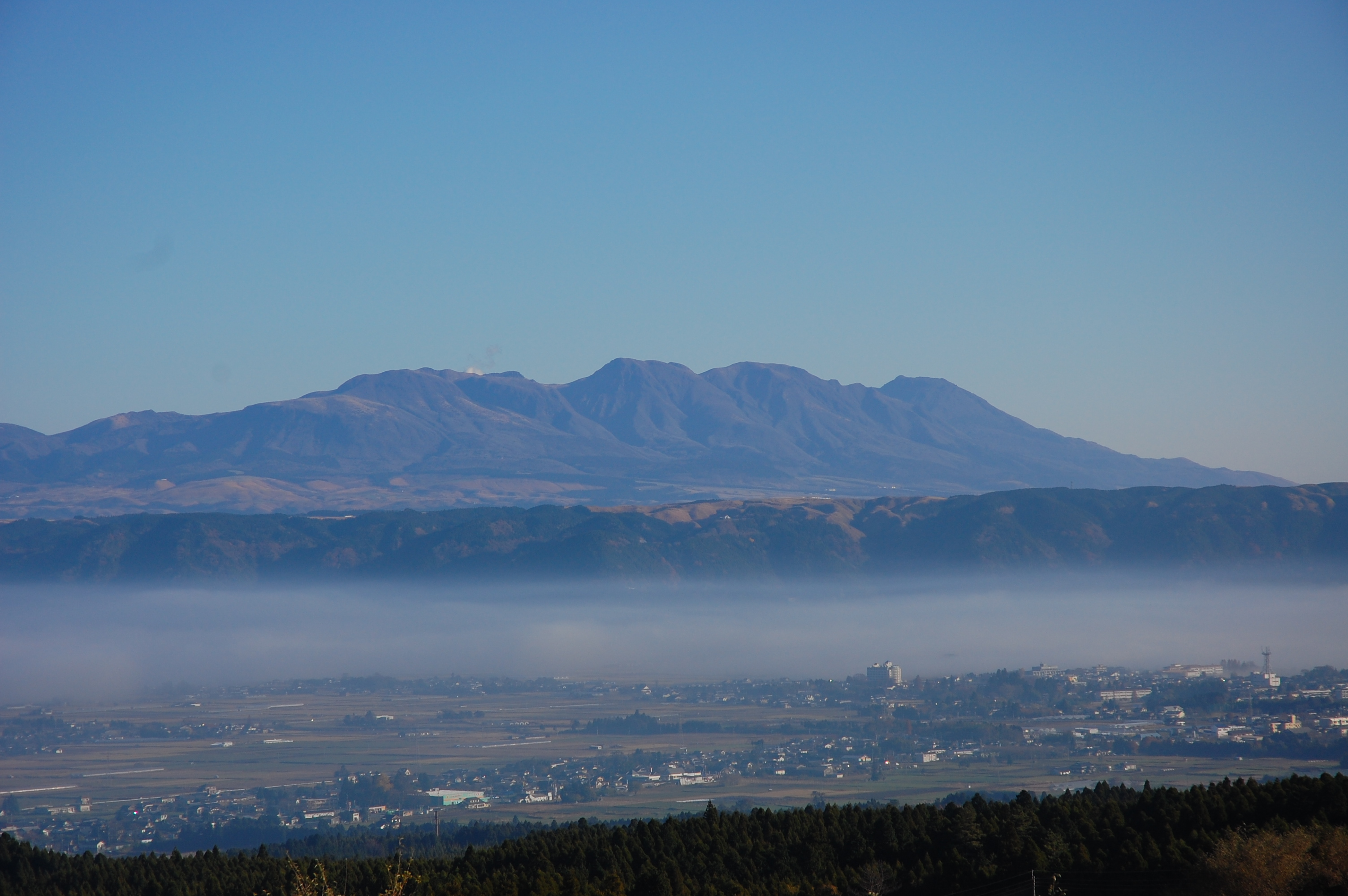
- View of Kyushu Mountains with Mount Kujū.

Highest point
- Peak: Mount Sobo
- Elevation: 1,756 m (5,761 ft)

Naming
- Native name: 九州山地 (Japanese); Kyūshū Sanchi (Japanese)

Geography
- Location within Japan
- Country: Japan
- Region: Kantō region
- Range coordinates: 32°49′N 131°23′E
- Parent range: Kantō Range

Kyushu Mountains (Japanese: 九州山地) is a mountain range that runs from northeast to southwest in central Kyushu.

Geofeatures map of Kyushu

The highest peak of the mountain range is Mount Sobo.
