= Kumamoto 4th district =

Legislative district of Japan

Kumamoto 4th District
- 熊本県第4区
- Parliamentary constituency for the Japanese House of Representatives
- Prefecture: Kumamoto
- Electorate: 399,867 (as of September 2022)

Current constituency
- Created: 1994
- Seats: One
- Party: LDP
- Representative: Yasushi Kaneko

Kumamoto 4th District (熊本県第4区, Kumamoto-ken dai-yon-ku; or 熊本4区 Kumamoto yon-ku) is a current single-member electoral district for the House of Representatives, the lower house of the National Diet of Japan. It is located in Kumamoto and since 2017 covers roughly the Southern half of Kumamoto.

Before 2013, it consisted of a small section of the prefectural capital Kumamoto (the former towns of Tomiai and Jōnan in today's Minami-ku), the cities of Amakusa, Uto, Kami-Amakusa and Uki and the remaining towns and villages of the former Amakusa, Upper (Kami-Mashiki) and Lower Mashiki (Shimo-Mashiki) counties. As of September 2012, 294,547 eligible voters were resident in the district.

Before 1996, the area had been part of the four-member Kumamoto 2nd district. Representatives had included Sunao Sonoda (DPJ→PDP→Progressive→JDP→LDP, 1947–1984) and his son Hiroyuki (LDP→NPH, 1986–1996). Hiroyuki Sonoda, deputy chief cabinet secretary during the LDP-JSP-NPH coalition, won the new single-member 4th district six times in a row after the electoral reform. In several elections, he was not even challenged by a candidate from the major party of the opposing bloc, exceptions were the initial election of 1996 and the "postal election" of 2005. In 2012, neither of the two established major parties contested the seat. Sonoda's main challenger in 2012, Masayoshi Yagami, had become a Liberal Democrat (JNP→NFP→LDP) when he represented the neighbouring 5th district in the 1990s, but became an independent for his two terms as mayor of Sagara and his failed run for governor of Kumamoto in 2008.

== List of representatives ==
Representative	Party	Dates	Notes
Hiroyuki Sonoda	NPS	1996–2000	Became independent in 1998, returned to the LDP in 1999
Hiroyuki Sonoda	LDP	2000–2012	Joined SPJ in 2010, merged into SP, then JRP in 2012
Hiroyuki Sonoda	JRP	2012–2014	Co-founded the Party for Future Generations in 2014
Hiroyuki Sonoda	PJK	2014–2017	Returned to LDP in 2015, moved to the Kyūshū PR block in the 2017 election
Yasushi Kaneko	LDP	2017–	Represented the abolished Kumamoto 5th district 2000–2017

== Election results ==
2026
Party	Candidate	Votes	%	±%
LDP	Yasushi Kaneko	141,699	66.2	▲7.9
Ishin	Masayoshi Yagami	22,742	10.6	▼7.0
Sanseitō	Takatoshi Ueda	17,995	8.4	
DPP	Itaru Ueda	16,403	7.7	
JCP	Kumiko Motomura	15,102	7.1	
Turnout			58.41	▲3.63
LDP hold				

2024
Party	Candidate	Votes	%	±%
LDP	Yasushi Kaneko	119,947	58.28	▼9.82
CDP	Yukiko Sasamoto	49,672	24.13	▼7.77
Ishin	Masayoshi Yagami	36,203	17.59	New
Turnout		205,822	54.78	▼2.72
LDP hold				

2021
Party	Candidate	Votes	%	±%
LDP	Yasushi Kaneko	155,572	68.1	▲5.3
CDP	Masayoshi Yagami	72,966	31.9	▼5.3
Turnout		232,464	57.50	▼0.51
LDP hold				

2017
Party	Candidate	Votes	%	±%
LDP	Yasushi Kaneko	150,453	62.8	
CDP	Masayoshi Yagami (won seat in the Kyūshū PR block)	89,279	37.2	
Turnout		247,233	58.01	
LDP hold				

2014
Party	Candidate	Votes	%	±%
Japanese Kokoro	Hiroyuki Sonoda	101,581	75.9	+10.0
JCP	Eiji Iseri	32,223	24.1	new
Turnout				
Japanese Kokoro gain from Restoration		Swing		

2012
Party	Candidate	Votes	%	±%
Restoration	Hiroyuki Sonoda	102,975	65.9	+6.7
Independent	Masayoshi Yagami	36,652	23.5	new
JCP	Yōko Minoda	16,585	10.6	new
Turnout				
Restoration gain from LDP		Swing		

2009
Party	Candidate	Votes	%	±%
LDP	Hiroyuki Sonoda	123,900	59.2	−9.1
People's New	Shin'ichi Matsunaga	78,811	37.6	new
Happiness Realization	Ichirō Kōno	6,668	3.2	new
Turnout				
LDP hold		Swing		

2005
Party	Candidate	Votes	%	±%
LDP	Hiroyuki Sonoda	136,380	68.3	−5.3
Democratic	Motosuke Matsumoto	63,169	31.7	new
Turnout				
LDP hold		Swing		

2003
Party	Candidate	Votes	%	±%
LDP	Hiroyuki Sonoda	137,428	73.6	−5.6
Social Democratic	Ikuo Morikawa	36,977	19.8	new
JCP	Shimako Iseri	12,262	6.6	new
Turnout				
LDP hold		Swing		

2000
Party	Candidate	Votes	%	±%
LDP	Hiroyuki Sonoda	149,156	79.2	+20.2
Liberal League	Kōji Wakaki (? 若城浩史)	21,028	11.2	new
JCP	Keiichi Fukuda	18,188	9.7	new
Turnout				
LDP gain from NP-Sakigake		Swing		

1996
Party	Candidate	Votes	%	±%
NP-Sakigake	Hiroyuki Sonoda	117,441	59.0	N/A
New Frontier	Kimihiro Yasuda	73,231	36.8	N/A
JCP	Nobuhiro Yamamoto	8,511	4.3	N/A
Turnout				
NP-Sakigake win (new seat)				
