= Hitoyoshi Domain =

Japanese feudal domain located in Higo Province

Hitoyoshi Domain 人吉藩
- Domain of Japan
- 1585–1871
- Mon of the Sagara clan

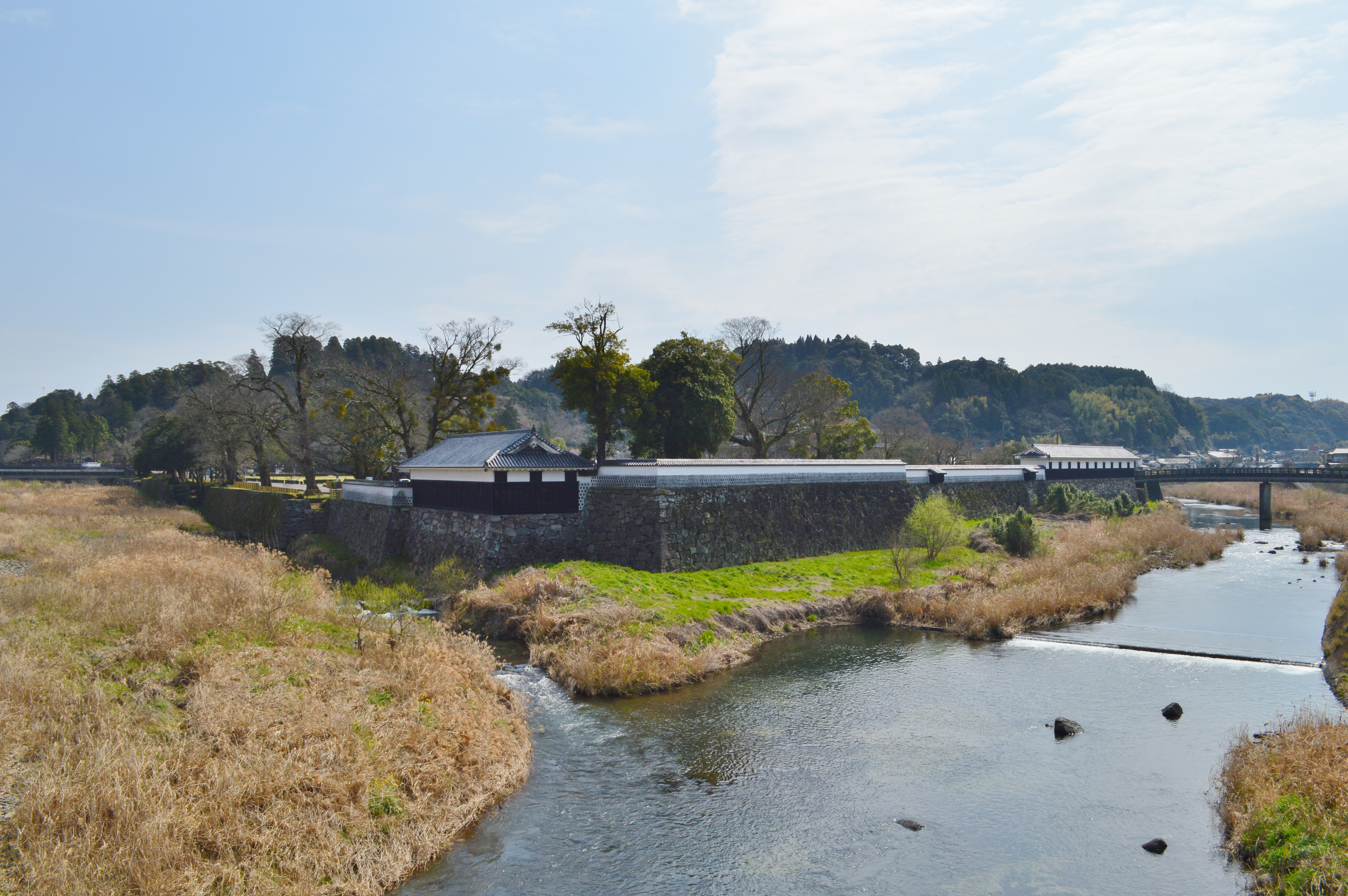
- Restored tower and wall of Hitoyoshi Castle
- Capital: Hitoyoshi Castle
- Government
  - Type: Daimyō
- Daimyō
  - 1585-1636: Sagara Yorifusa (first)
  - 1855-1871: Sagara Yorimoto (last)
- Historical era: Edo period
  - Established: 1585
  - Disestablished: 1871
- Today part of: Kumamoto Prefecture
- Location of Hitoyoshi Castle Hitoyoshi Domain (Japan)

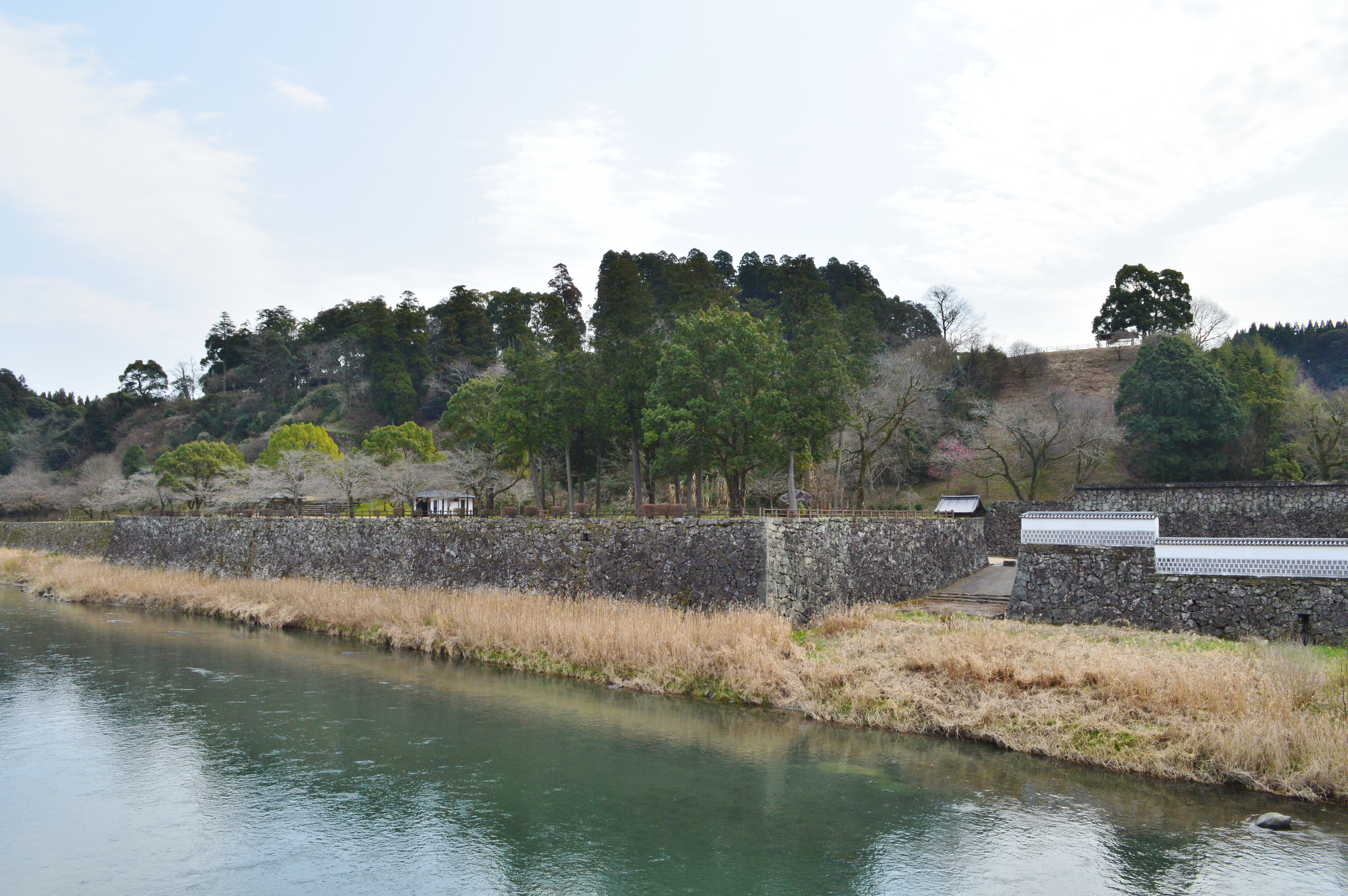
Stone Walls of Hitoyoshi Castle

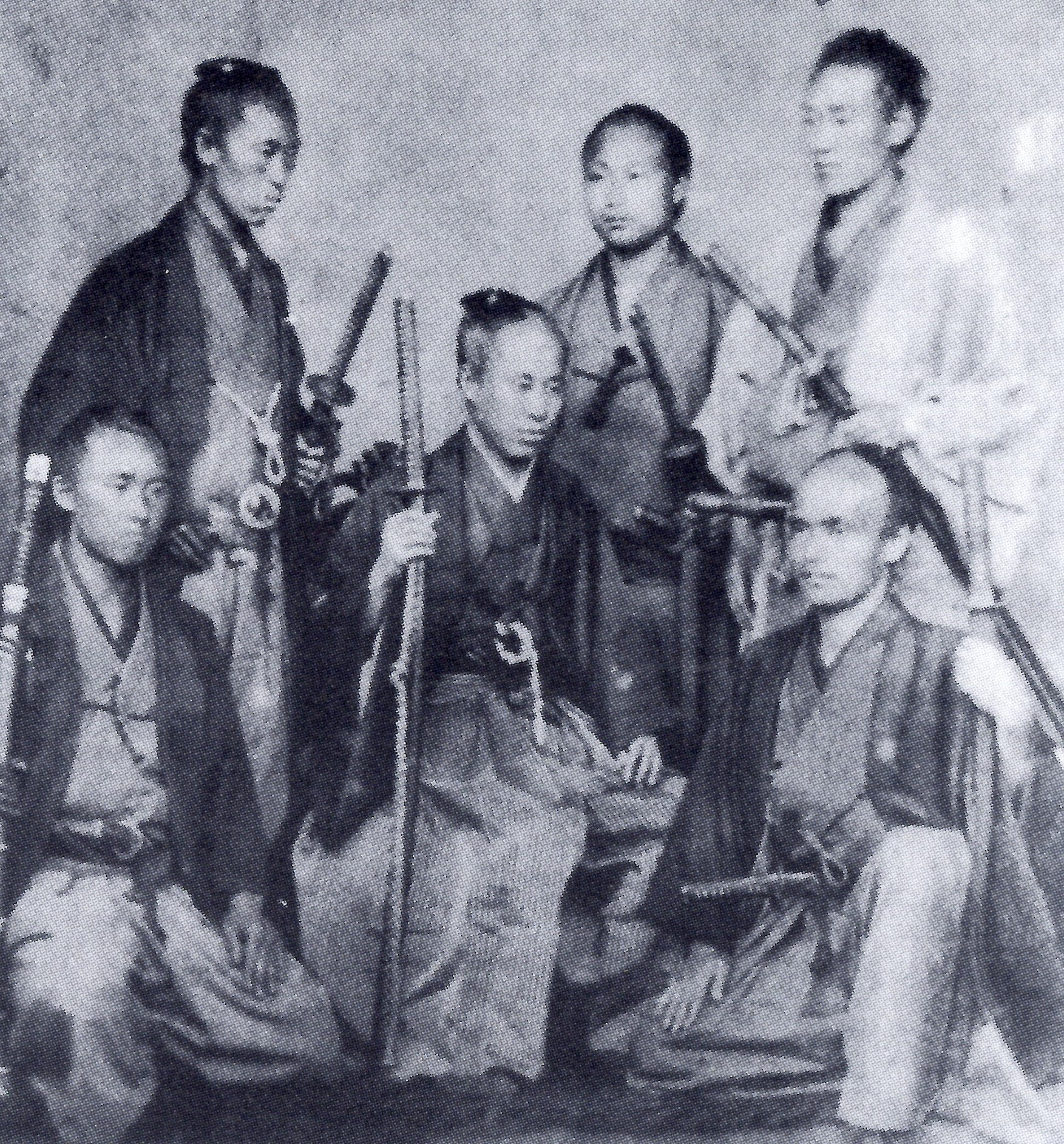
Sagara Yorimoto, final daimyo of Hitoyoshi Domain

Hitoyoshi Domain (人吉藩, Hitoyoshi-han) was a Japanese domain of the Edo period. It was centered around Hitoyoshi Castle in what is now the city of Hitoyoshi, Kumamoto and was ruled by the tozama daimyō Sagara clan for all of its history.

== History ==
The Sagara clan was appointed Jitō (land stewards) of this region of Higo Province in 1193 by the Kamakura shogunate. When they relocated to the region from their ancestral estates in Suruga Province, they brought with them many metal craftsmen, and this was a major industry of the Hitoyoshi area into the twentieth century. During the Sengoku period, the Sagara were among the first to side with Toyotomi Hideyoshi during his invasion of Kyushu of 1586, and were allowed to keep their territory. Prior to the 1600 Battle of Sekigahara, the clan supported Ishida Mitsunari and the Western Army, but afterwards defected to Tokugawa Ieyasu and the Eastern Army, and were again confirmed in their existing holdings. Under the Tokugawa Shogunate, Hitoyoshi Domain (as with Satsuma Domain) retained vestiges of a medieval administrative structure, which included an outer castle system with 14 castle-holding vassals who governed the land. There was no separation of samurai and farmers, and unpaid samurai who were half farmers and half soldiers made up about one-third of the population. Also, like the Satsuma Domain, Hitoyoshi strictly adhered to the prohibition on Christianity and the Jodo Shinshu Hongwanji-ha sect.

The finances of the domain were enriched by "Nagasaki Shopping", in which the domain bought foreign textiles form the Dutch East India Company in at Dejima in Nagasaki and sold these goods in Kyoto for a high profit. The domain also developed new paddy fields, cultivating an addition 21,000 koku in addition to its official kokudaka of 22,000 koku of land. In addition, the domain improved the Kuma River for transportation, and obtained permission from the Hosokawa clan of Kumamoto Domain to establish a dock and warehouses in Yatsushiro at the mouth of the river. However, despite these advantages, the domain's finances steadily worsened throughout the Edo Period. The shogunate made frequent demands on the domain to undertake public works projects, such as repairs on Edo Castle. The daimyō of the domain tended to be short-lived, making implementation of reforms (such as the monopolization of hemp, shiitake mushrooms, tea, and other crops) difficult, and led to frequent O-Ie Sōdō succession disputes. The jōkamachi of Hitoyoshi suffered from frequent natural disasters, especially flooding, and almost completed burned down in a fire in 1862.

In 1871, Hitoyoshi became part of Kumamoto Prefecture. The Sagara clan were later elevated to viscount in the kazoku peerage system in 1884.

== Holdings at the end of the Edo period ==
As with most domains in the han system, Hitoyoshi Domain consisted of several discontinuous territories calculated to provide the assigned kokudaka, based on periodic cadastral surveys and projected agricultural yields.

- Higo Province
  - 54 villages in Kuma District (entire district
- Hyūga Province
  - 4 villages in Usuki District

== List of daimyo ==
| # | Name | Tenure | Courtesy title | Court Rank | kokudaka |
|---|---|---|---|---|---|
Sagara clan, 1585–1871 (Tozama daimyō)
| 1 | Sagara Yorifusa (相良頼房) | 1585–1636 | Kunai-no-suke (大輔 宮内); Saemon-no-suke (左衛門佐) | Junior 5th Rank, Lower Grade (従五位下) | 22,000 koku |
| 2 | Sagara Yorihiro (相良頼広) | 1636–1664 | Iki-no-kami (壱岐守) | Junior 5th Rank, Lower Grade (従五位下) | 22,000 koku |
| 3 | Sagara Yoritaka (相良頼隆) | 1664–1703 | Tōtōmi-no-kami (遠江守) | Junior 5th Rank, Lower Grade (従五位下) | 22,000 koku |
| 4 | Sagara Yoritomi (相良頼富) | 1703–1712 | Shima-no-kami (志摩守) | Junior 5th Rank, Lower Grade (従五位下) | 22,000 koku |
| 5 | Sagara Nagaoki (相良長興 ) | 1712–1721 | Tōtōmi-no-kami (遠江守) | Junior 5th Rank, Lower Grade (従五位下) | 22,000 koku |
| 6 | Sagara Nagaakira (相良長有) | 1721–1738 | Tōtōmi-no-kami (遠江守) | Junior 5th Rank, Lower Grade (従五位下) | 22,000 koku |
| 7 | Sagara Yorimine (相良頼峰) | 1738–1758 | Shima-no-kami (志摩守) | Junior 5th Rank, Lower Grade (従五位下) | 22,000 koku |
| 8 | Sagara Yorihisa (相良頼久) | 1758–1759 | Tōtōmi-no-kami (遠江守) | Junior 5th Rank, Lower Grade (従五位下) | 22,000 koku |
| 9 | Sagara Mitsunaga (相良明長) | 1759–1762 | -None- | -None- | 22,000 koku |
| 10 | Sagara Yorisada (相良頼貞) | 1762–1767 | Tōtōmi-no-kami (遠江守) | Junior 5th Rank, Lower Grade (従五位下) | 22,000 koku |
| 11 | Sagara Tomimochi (相良富持) | 1767–1769 | Echizen-no-kami(遠江守) | Junior 5th Rank, Lower Grade (越前守) | 22,000 koku |
| 12 | Sagara Nagahiro (相良長弘) | 1769–1802 | Iki-no-kami (壱岐守) | Junior 5th Rank, Lower Grade (越前守) | 22,000 koku |
| 13 | Sagara Yorinori (相良頼則) | 1802–1818 | Shima-no-kami (志摩守) | Junior 5th Rank, Lower Grade (対馬守 ) | 22,000 koku |
| 14 | Sagara Yoriyuki (相良頼之) | 1818–1839 | Iki-no-kami (壱岐守) | Junior 5th Rank, Lower Grade (越前守) | 22,000 koku |
| 15 | Sagara Nagatomi (相良永富) | 1839–1855 | Iki-no-kami (壱岐守) | Junior 5th Rank, Lower Grade (越前守) | 22,000 koku |
| 16 | Sagara Yorimoto (相良頼基) | 1855–1871 | Tōtōmi-no-kami (遠江守) | Junior 5th Rank, Lower Grade (越前守) | 22,000 koku |

== See also ==
- Abolition of the han system
- List of Han
