= Higo Province =

Former province of Japan

Map of Japanese provinces (1868) with Higo Province highlighted

Higo Province (肥後国, Higo no Kuni) (Note: Japanese pronunciation: [çí.ɡò̞ (nò̞ kɯ̈̀.ɲ̟ì), çí.ŋò̞ (nò̞ kɯ̈̀.ɲ̟ì), çì.ɡó̞ (nò̞ kɯ̈̀.ɲ̟ì), çì.ŋó̞ (nò̞ kɯ̈̀.ɲ̟ì)]) was an old province of Japan in the area that is today Kumamoto Prefecture on the island of Kyūshū. It was sometimes called Hishū (肥州), with Hizen Province. Higo bordered on Chikugo, Bungo, Hyūga, Ōsumi, and Satsuma Provinces.

== History ==
The castle town of Higo was usually at Kumamoto City. During the Muromachi period, Higo was held by the Kikuchi clan, but they were dispossessed during the Sengoku period, and the province was occupied by neighboring lords, including the Shimazu clan of Satsuma, until Toyotomi Hideyoshi invaded Kyūshū and gave Higo to his retainers, first Sassa Narimasa and later Katō Kiyomasa. The Kato were soon stripped of their lands, and the region was given to the Hosokawa clan.

During the Sengoku Period, Higo was a major center for Christianity in Japan, and it is also the location where the philosopher, the artist and swordsman Miyamoto Musashi stayed at the Hosokawa daimyō's invitation, Hosokawa Tadatoshi third lord of Kumamoto, while completing his The Book of Five Rings.

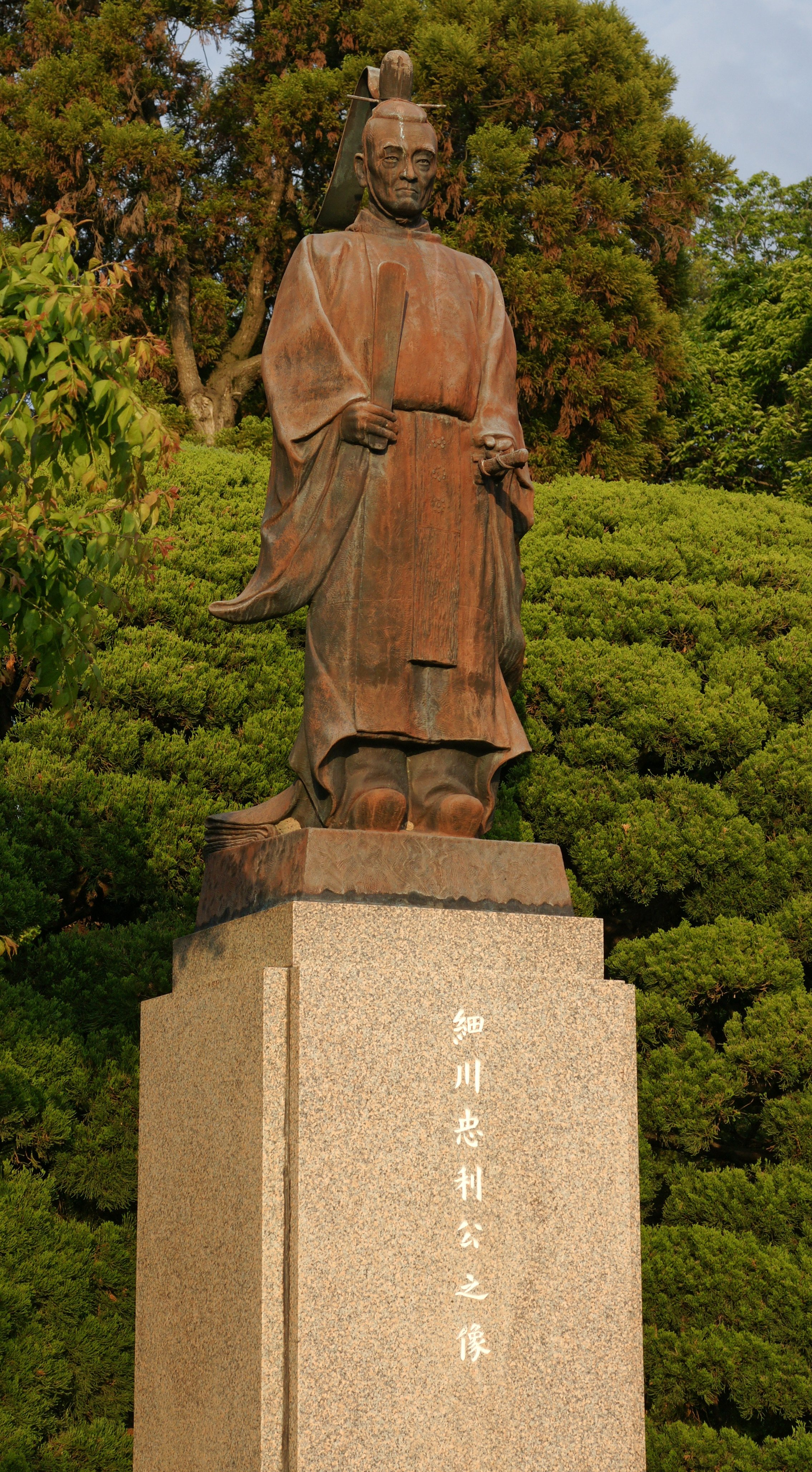
Statue of Hosokawa Tadatoshi within Suizen-ji Jōju-en

Mon of Miyamoto Musashi born in Ōhara-chō province of Mimasaka

During the Meiji period, the provinces of Japan were converted into prefectures. Maps of Japan and Higo Province were reformed in the 1870s. At the same time, the province continued to exist for some purposes. For example, Higo is explicitly recognized in the 1894 treaties with the United States and the United Kingdom.

== Shrines and temples ==
Aso-jinja was the chief Shinto shrine (ichinomiya) of Higo.

== Historical districts ==
- Kumamoto Prefecture
  - Akita District (飽田郡) – merged with Takuma District to become Hōtaku District (飽託郡) on April 1, 1896
  - Amakusa District (天草郡)
  - Ashikita District (葦北郡)
  - Aso District (阿蘇郡)
  - Gōshi District (合志郡) – merged into Kikuchi District on April 1, 1896
  - Kikuchi District (菊池郡) – absorbed Gōshi District on April 1, 1896
  - Kuma District (球磨郡)
  - Mashiki District (益城郡)
    - Kamimashiki District (上益城郡)
    - Shimomashiki District (下益城郡)
  - Takuma District (託麻郡) – merged with Akita District to become Hōtaku District on April 1, 1896
  - Tamana District (玉名郡)
  - Uto District (宇土郡) – dissolved
  - Yamaga District (山鹿郡) – merged with Yamamoto District to become Kamoto District (鹿本郡) on April 1, 1896
  - Yamamoto District (山本郡) – merged with Yamaga District to become Kamoto District on April 1, 1896
  - Yatsushiro District (八代郡)

== See also ==
- Hitoyoshi Domain
- Kumamoto Domain
- Uto Domain

== Bibliography ==
- Nussbaum, Louis-Frédéric and Käthe Roth. (2005). Japan encyclopedia. Cambridge: Harvard University Press. ISBN 978-0-674-01753-5; OCLC 58053128
- Papinot, Edmond. (1910). Historical and Geographic Dictionary of Japan. Tokyo: Librarie Sansaisha. OCLC 77691250
