= Hitoyoshi Castle =

Castle ruins in Hitoyoshi, Kumamoto, Japan

- 人吉城
- Hitoyoshi, Kumamoto Japan
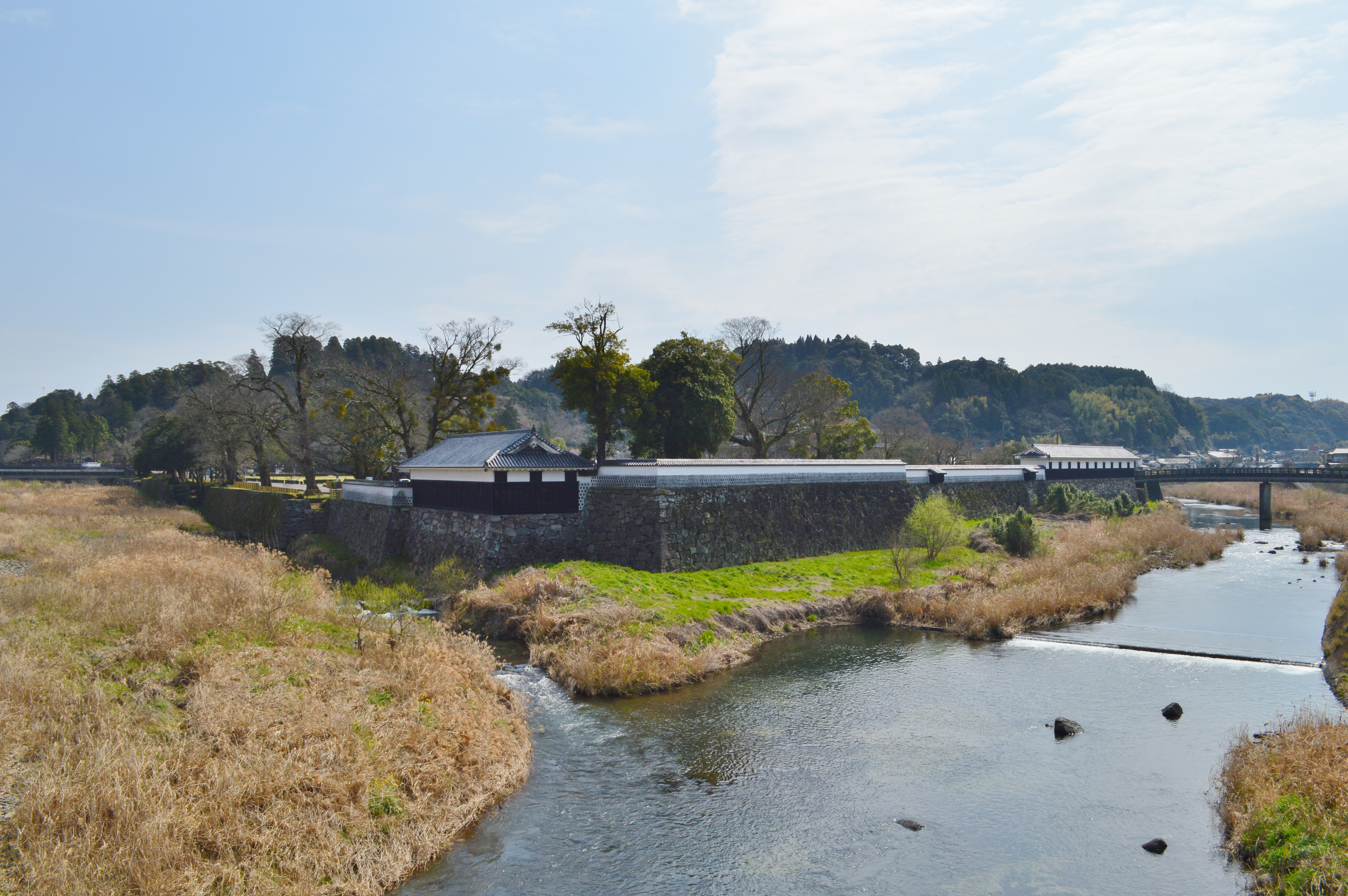
- Hitoyoshi Castle

Site information
- Type: Japanese castle
- Controlled by: Sagara clan
- Open to the public: yes
- Condition: Archaeological and designated national historical site; castle ruins

Location
- Coordinates: 32°12′39.9″N 130°45′59.37″E

Site history
- Built: Kamakura period, early Edo Period
- National Historic Site of Japan

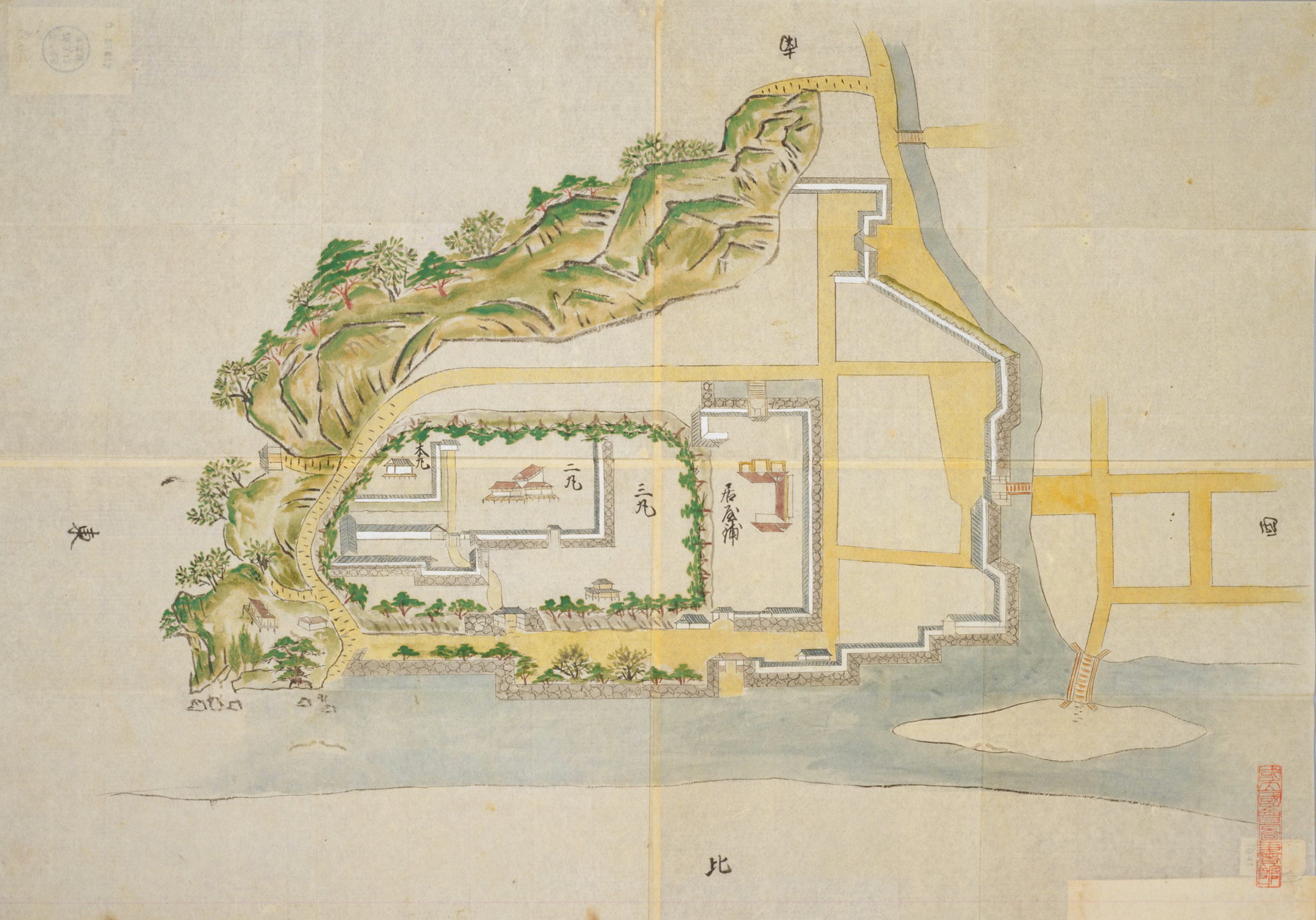
Map of Hitoyoshi Castle

Hitoyoshi Castle (人吉城, Hitoyoshi-jō) was an Edo period flatlands-style Japanese castle located in the city of Hitoyoshi, Kumamoto Prefecture, Japan. Its ruins have been protected as a National Historic Site since 1961. It is No.93 on the list "100 Fine Castles of Japan". Since the Sagara clan was appointed jitō (land steward) n the Kamakura period, the clan inhabited this castle for 35 generations, for 670 years until the Meiji restoration of 1871.

== Overview ==
Hitoyoshi Castle is located on the south side of the Kuma River that flows through the center of Hitoyoshi city, and is built on a mountain at the confluence of the Kuma River and its tributary, the Mune River. This is in the Hitoyoshi Basin, a 30 by 15 kilometer valley surrounded by tall mountains at the southern border of Higo Province. The Kuma River and Mune River serve as natural moats on the north and west sides, and the mountain slopes and cliffs serve as natural castle walls on the east and south sides. The San-no-maru (Third Enciente) is located along the Kuma River, the Ni-no-maru (Second Enciente) to the south, and the Hon-maru (Main Enciente ) on the hill, making it a flatland castle with a terraced structure. The Main Enciente never had a tenshu castle tower. In the Sengoku period, there were also subsidiary castles called Uehara Castle, Nakahara Castle, and Shimohara Castle on the hills to the south, southeast, and east of the main castle, across the valley, but the ruins of these fortifications are not included in the current National Historic Site.

Part of the stone wall of the daimyō palace built at the end of the Edo period is a unique stone wall called "Musha-gaeshi" that uses a European castle construction technique, in which the wall has a slight protrusion from the top, which prevents enemies from climbing over the wall, and also allows defenders to attack enemies clinging to the wall. This type of wall is rare, and is only found in the Goryōkaku and Tatsuoka Castle in Hakodate, but neither of them are as large as the stone wall of Hitoyoshi Castle.

The castle ruins are now known as Hitoyoshi Castle Park, and some yagura turrets and stonewalls have been restored. A Shinto shrine, the Sagara Gokoku Jinja is now located on the west side of the castle ruins. The Hitoyoshi City Hall was formerly located within the castle, but was relocated after the damage caused by the 2016 Kumamoto earthquakes. The Hitoyoshi Castle History Museum remains within the castle grounds.

== History ==
Sagara Nagayori, a local lord of Sagara shōen in Tōtōmi Province who served Minamoto no Yoritomo, was appointed as the land steward of Hitoyoshi shōen in Higo Province in 1205. This area was ruled by Yase Sumasuke, a vassal of Taira no Yorimori. Nagayori lured Sumasuke out under the pretense of cormorant hunting and murdered him. Nagayori expanded Sumasuke's castle and built the foundations of Hitoyoshi Castle. During the construction of the castle, a stone with a crescent-shaped pattern was unearthed. For this reason, the castle is also known as "Sengetsu Castle" or "Mikazuki Castle" [getsu or tsuki mean 'moon' in Japanese] During the Sengoku Period, the Sagara clan unified the Kuma region. However, after an internal dispute over the succession issue, on July 14, 1526, Hitoyoshi Castle was surrounded by a large army led by the Kitahara clan (who were backed by the Ikkō-ikki movement). Sagara Yoshishige used a stratagem to drive the Kitahara clan back, but this was the only time that Hitoyoshi Castle was attacked by another clan after the Sagara clan entered the castle.

After that, the 19th head of the family, Sagara Yoshiharu, began a major renovation of the castle during the Tenshō era (1573-1593), which was only completed in 1639. During the Sengoku period, the Sagara clan endured constant threats from the Shimazu clan in the south, and the Nawa clan and Ōtomo clan in the north, and in 1581 they surrendered to the Shimazu clan and became their vassals. In 1587, Sagara Yorifusa fought bravely during Toyotomi Hideyoshi's conquest of Kyushu, but surrendered, and was granted Hitoyoshi Castle and territory as an independent lord again through negotiations with his vassal, Fukamizu Nagatomo. In the Battle of Sekigahara in 1600, he initially sided with Ishida Mitsunari's (Western Army) and attacked Fushimi Castle and other castles, but after Ishida's defeat, he defected to the Tokugawa (Eastern Army) and was granted confirmation in his own holdings with an assessed kokudaka of 22,000 koku. Under Sagara Yorifusa, Hitoyoshi Castle was modernized per contemporary castle technology, with stone walls and masugata-style compound gates. The castle was also made more compact, with major part of old fortifications on the mountaintop abandoned. A long stone wall was also built along Kuma River, and the river port was constructed.

Prior to the Meiji restoration, Hitoyoshi Castle was destroyed in a fire in 1862. Following the start of the Meiji period, the site of the castle became a park. The site is a 15 minutes walk from JR Kyushu Hisatsu Line Hitoyoshi Station.

== Gallery ==
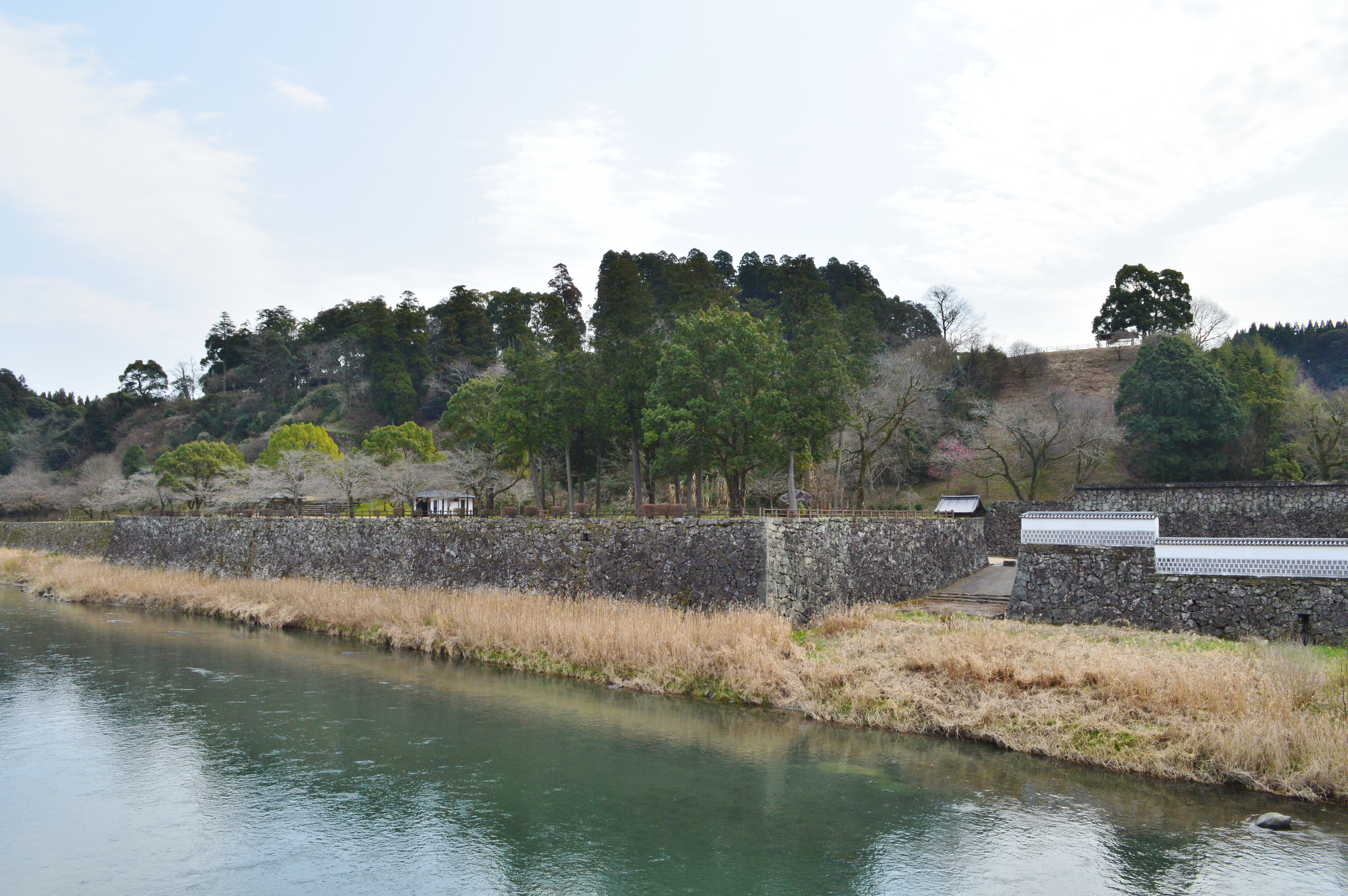
Panorama from Kuma River

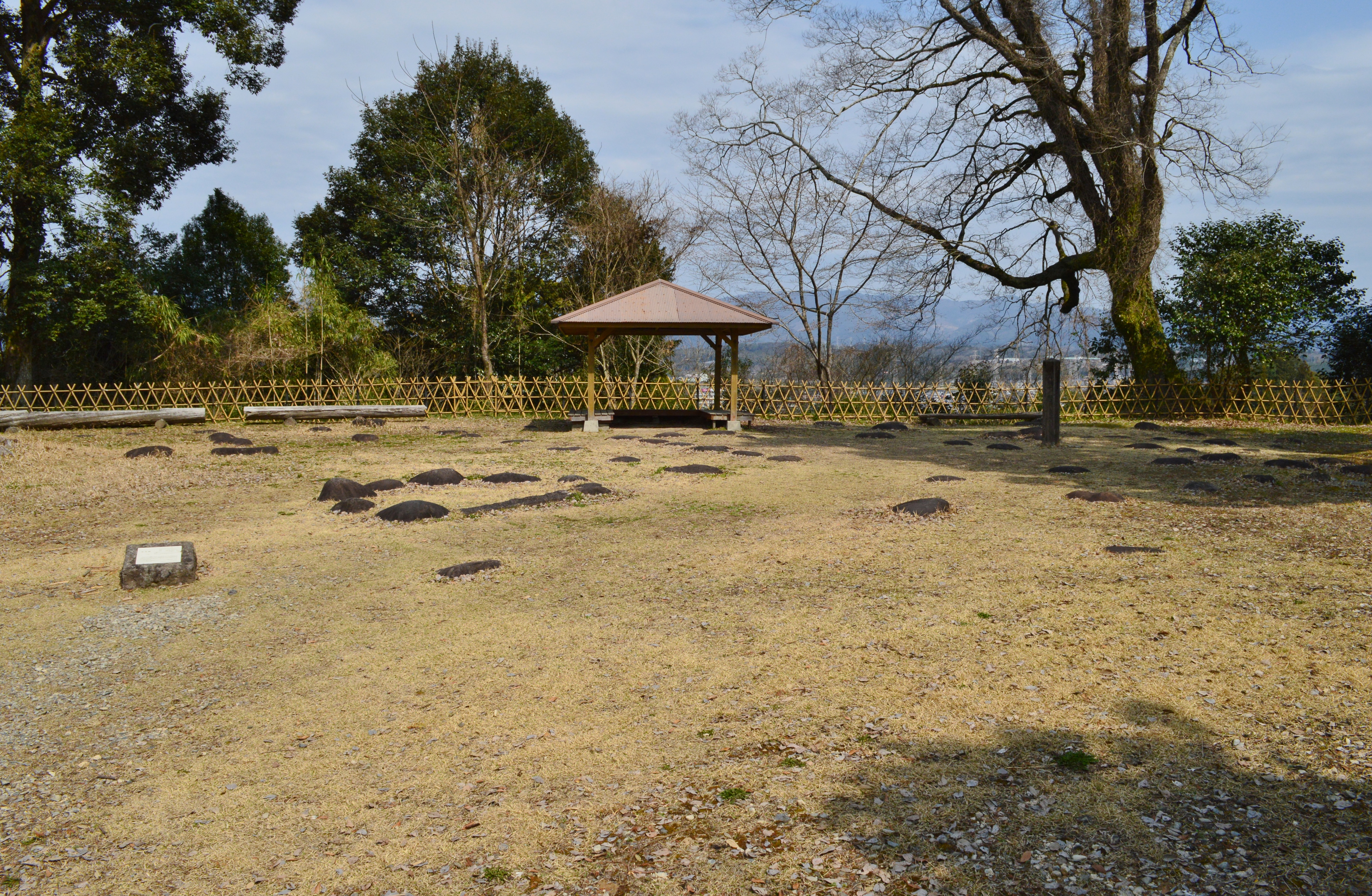
Hon-maru

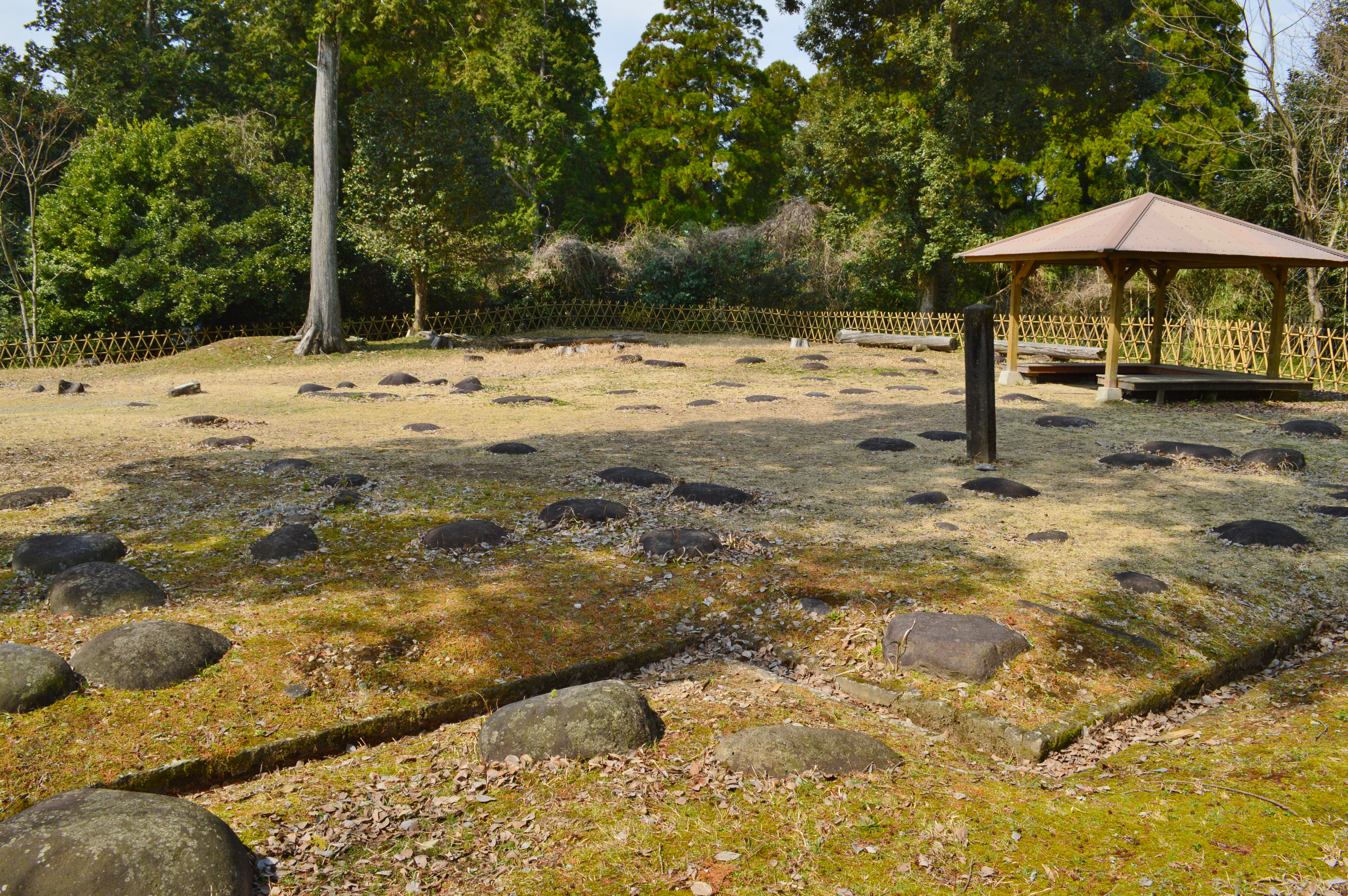
Foundation stones in the Hon-maru

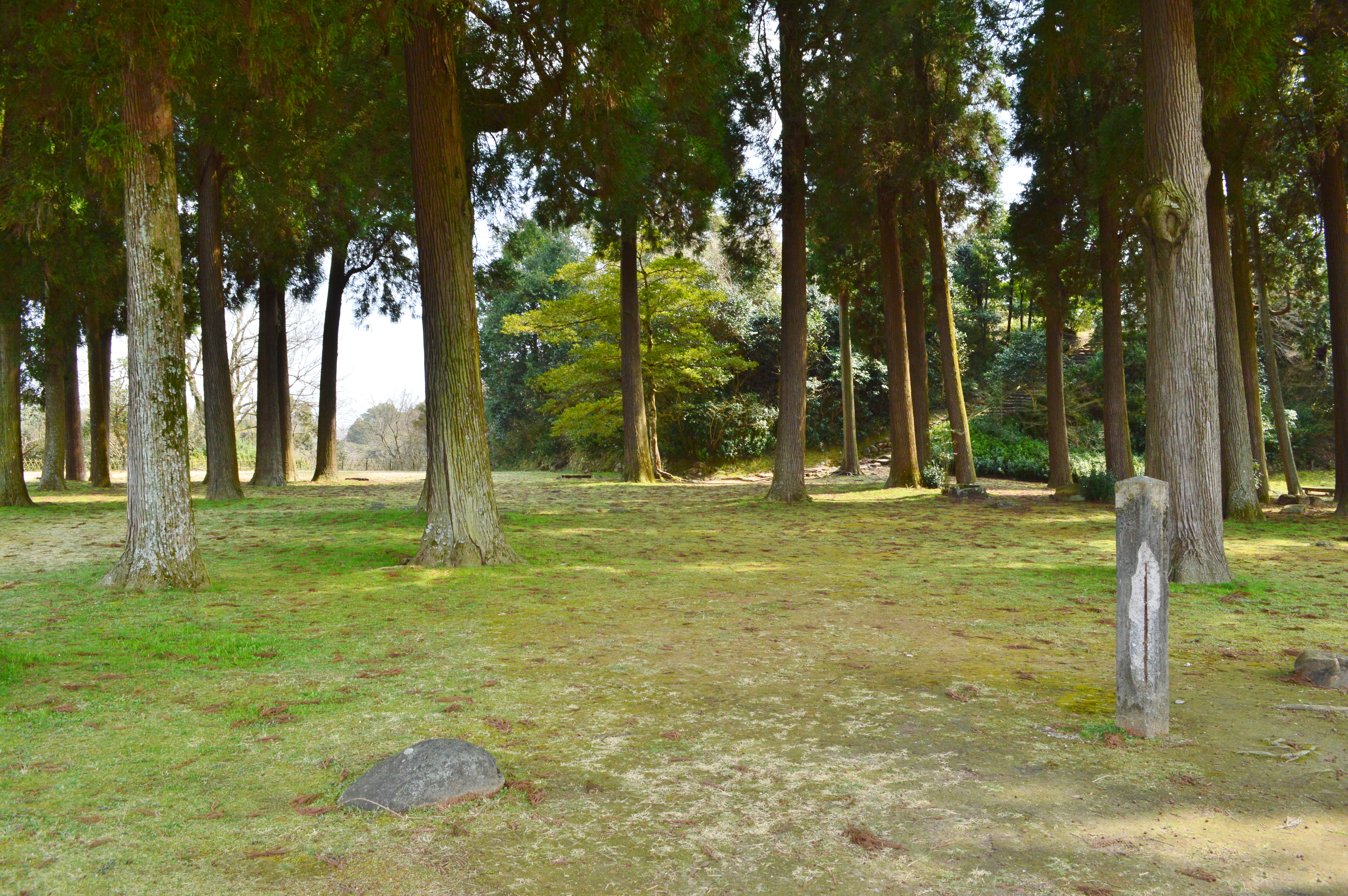
Ni-no-maru

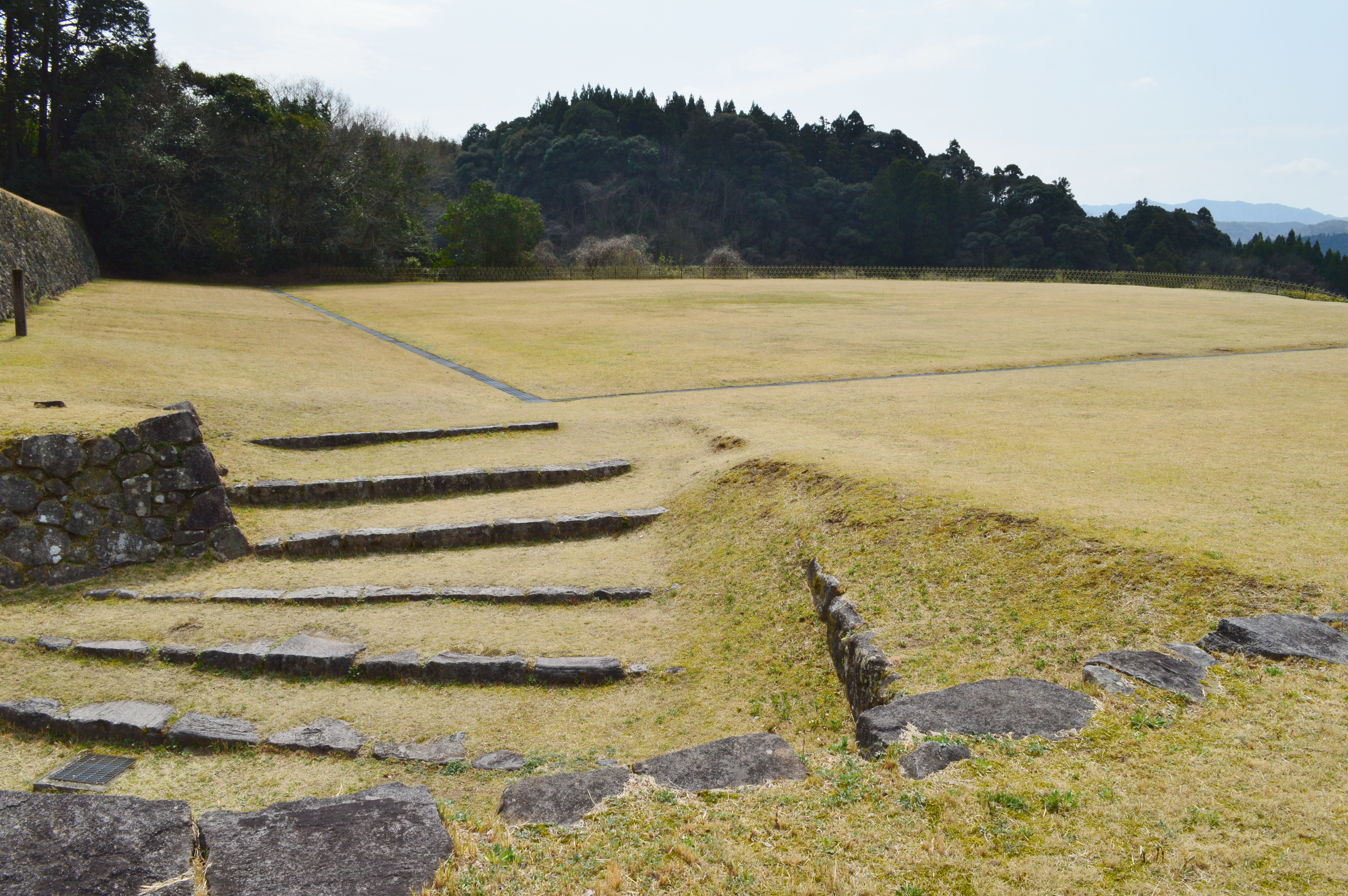
San-no-maru

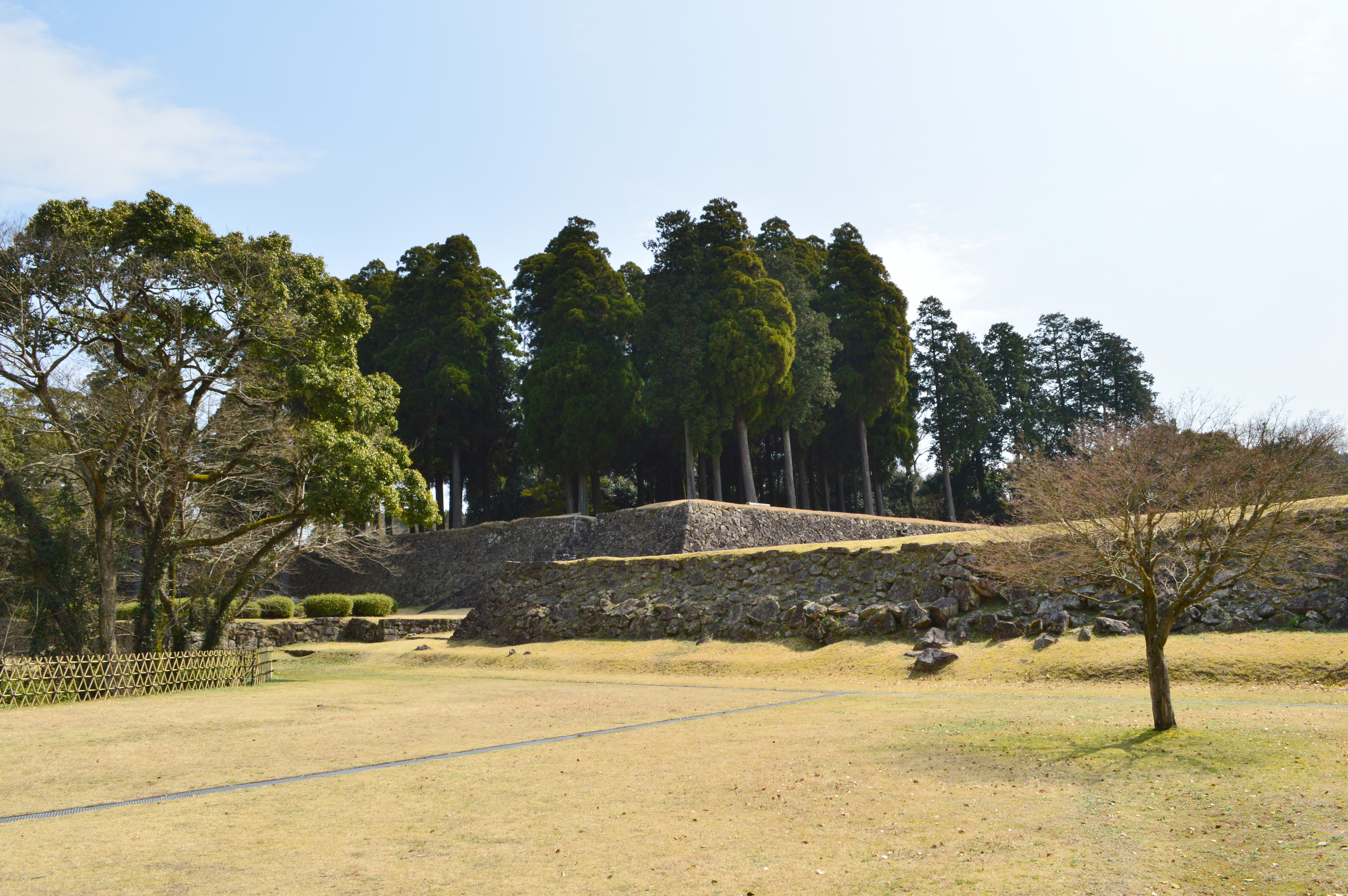
Stone walls of the Ni-no-maru and San-no-maru二の丸・三の丸石垣

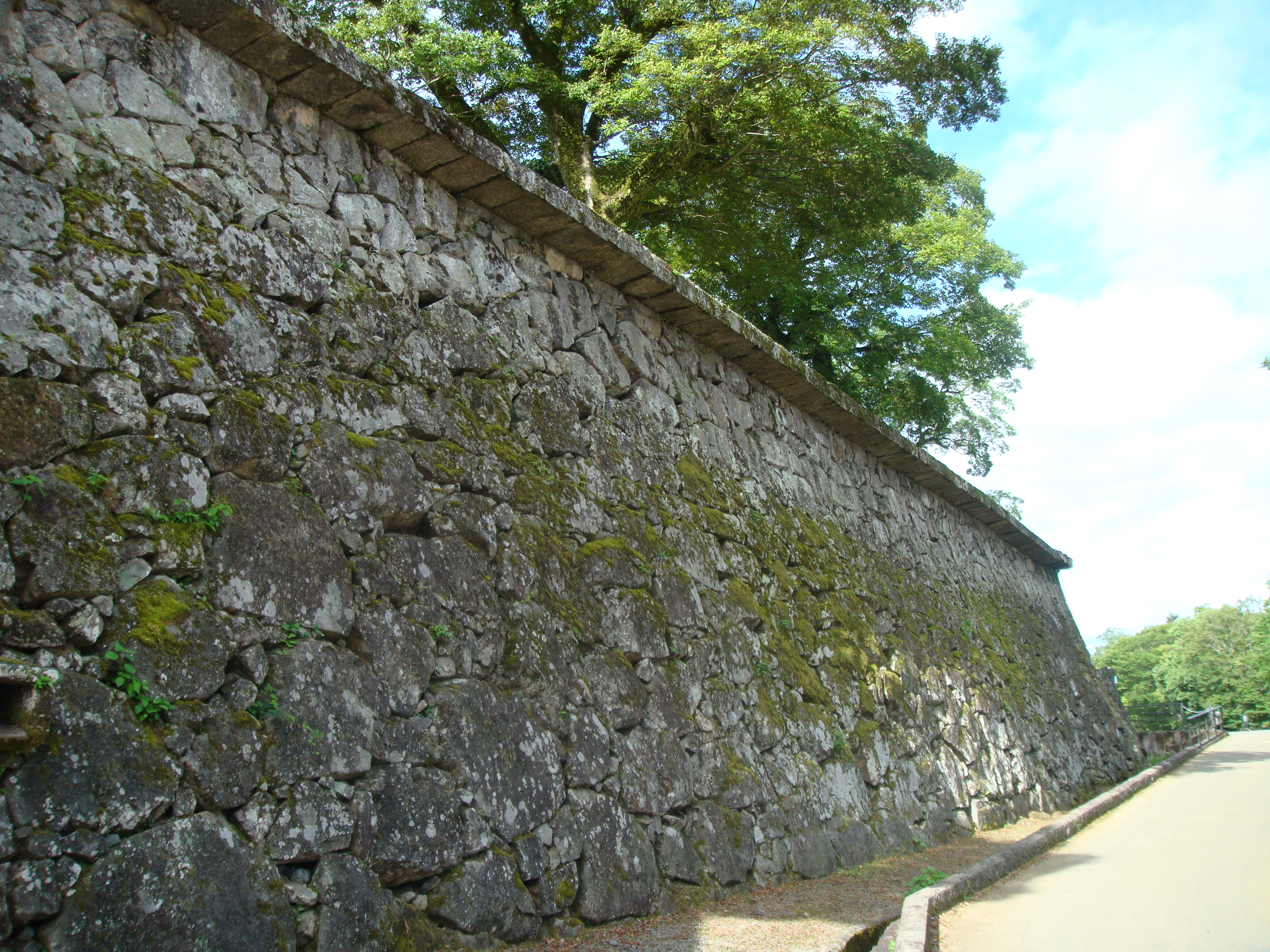
Musha-gaeshi on stone walls

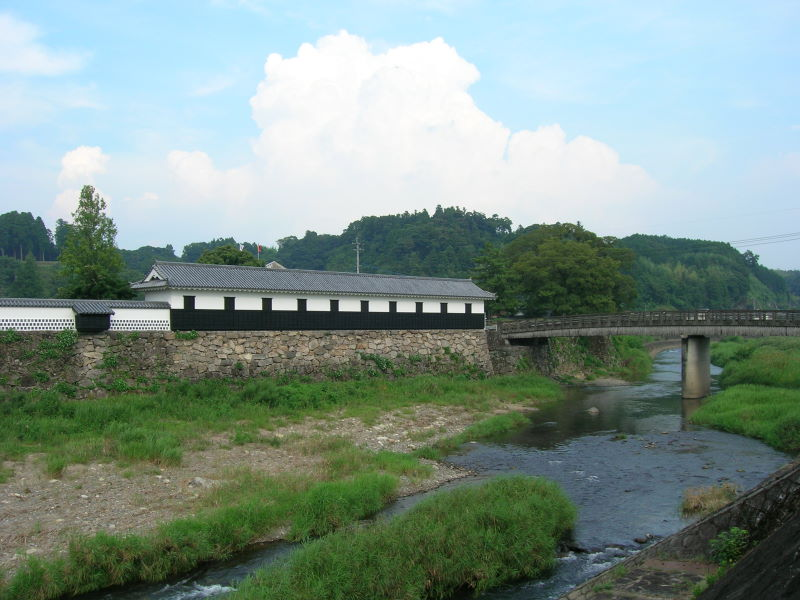
Otemon Tamon-yagura

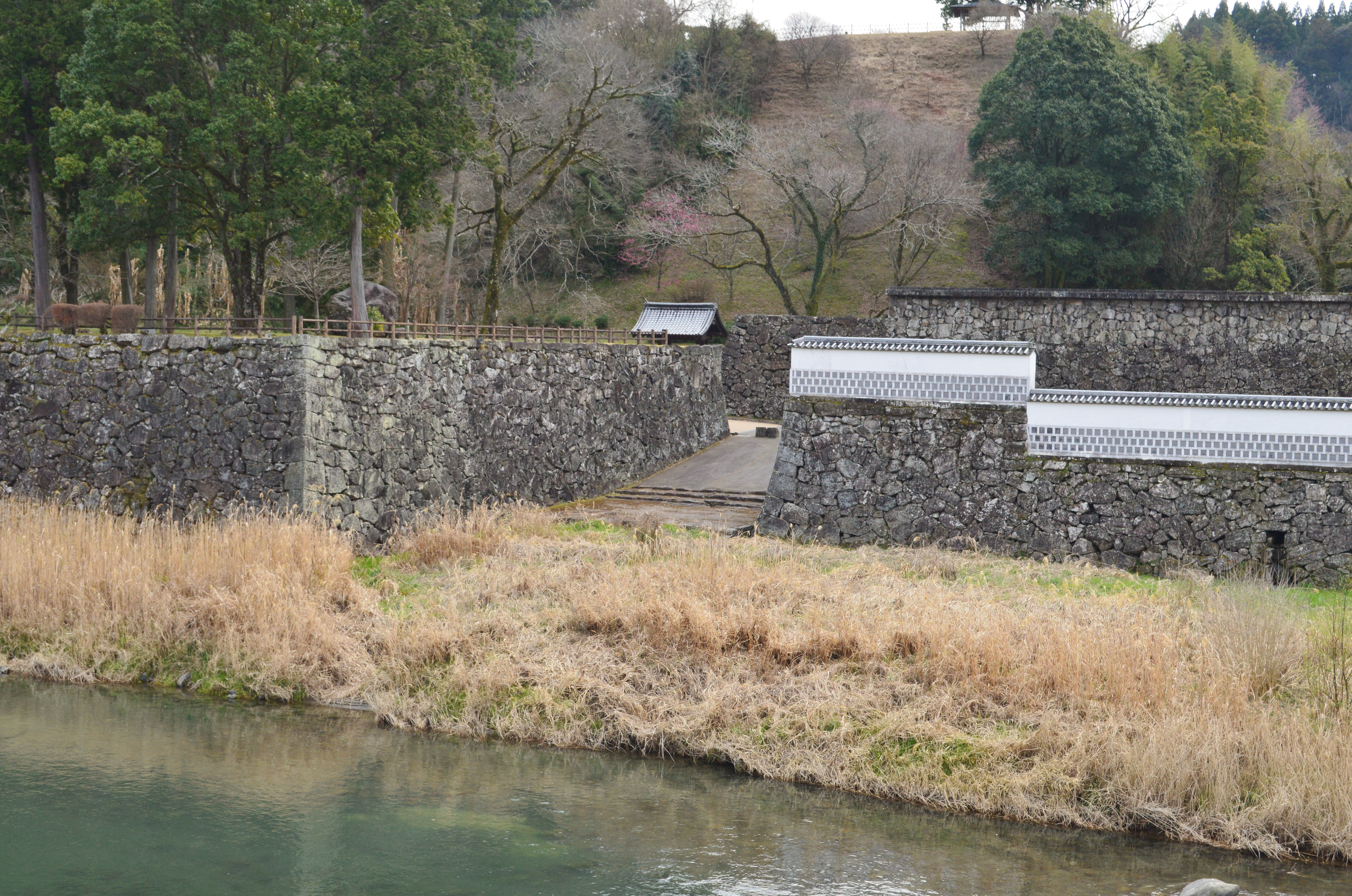
Gate

== See also ==
- List of Historic Sites of Japan (Kumamoto)

== Literature ==
- Benesch, Oleg and Ran Zwigenberg (2019). Japan's Castles: Citadels of Modernity in War and Peace. Cambridge: Cambridge University Press. p. 374. ISBN 9781108481946.
- De Lange, William (2021). An Encyclopedia of Japanese Castles. Groningen: Toyo Press. pp. 600 pages. ISBN 978-9492722300.
