= Kawasemi Yamasemi =

Japanese limited express train service

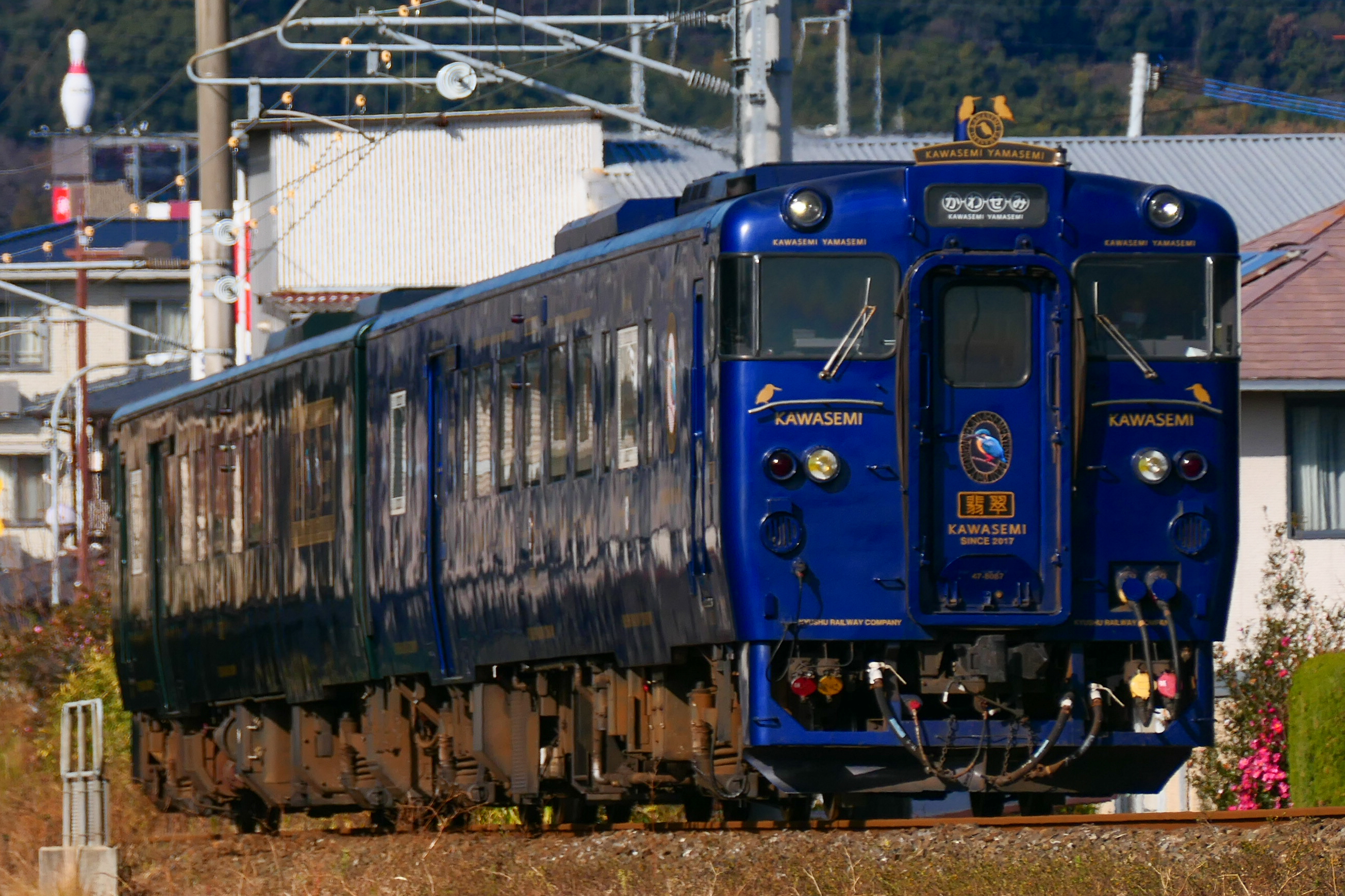
- Kawasemi Yamasemi in January 2023

Overview
- Service type: Limited express
- Status: Operational
- Locale: Kyushu, Japan
- First service: March 4, 2017
- Last service: March 15, 2025
- Current operator: JR Kyushu

Route
- Termini: Kumamoto; Miyaji (since 2022)
- Stops: 3
- Line used: Hōhi Main Line

Technical
- Rolling stock: KiHa 47 series DMU
- Track gauge: 1,067 mm (3 ft 6 in)
- Electrification: 2,000 V DC overhead (Kumamoto to Higo-Ōzu), Diesel (Higo-Ōzu to Miyaji)

Kawasemi Yamasemi (かわせみ やませみ) was a two-car limited express train operated by Kyushu Railway Company (JR Kyushu) in Japan.

== Overview ==
On November 9, 2016, JR Kyushu released a press release detailing its new themed limited express, Kawasemi Yamasemi, scheduled to debut in spring 2017. On December 16, 2016, it was revealed that the new train would begin operation on March 4, 2017.

The Kawasemi Yamasemi is named for the kingfisher and crested kingfisher, and follows the Kuma River along its route. It features the birds extensively as its motif.

== Design ==
The train was designed by Eiji Mitooka and Don Design and Associates, and used local resources (such as Japanese cypress and cedar) extensively in its construction. Onboard sales will also consist of local products.

The President of JR Kyushu, Toshihiko Aoyagi, at the train's unveiling, was quoted as saying that he hoped the train would run as a symbol of recovery (from the 2016 Kumamoto earthquakes).

== Operations ==
Between its inception and 2020, the train ran three daily round trips between Kumamoto and Hitoyoshi, running along the Hisatsu Line and Kagoshima Main Line.

Due to damage to the Hisatsu Line from the 2020 Kyushu floods, the Kawasemi Yamasemi ran between Kumamoto and Miyaji on the Hōhi Main Line since September 23, 2022. Apart from the two termini, the train also stopped at Higo-Ōzu, Tateno, and Aso. The service made one round trip per day on weekends and holidays between September 23, 2022 and March 15, 2025.

The service ceased regular operations on March 15, 2025 due to schedule changes.

== Train cars ==
The two cars are named Kawasemi and Yamasemi, respectively. They are both converted from KiHa 47 diesel multiple units. Kawasemi (blue) was converted from KiHa 47 8087. Yamasemi (green) was converted from KiHa 47 9051.

== See also ==
- List of named passenger trains of Japan
- Joyful Train, the generic name for excursion and charter trains in Japan
