= Sagara-Toshima Station =

Railway station in Sagara, Kumamoto Prefecture, Japan

Sagara-Toshima Station 相良十島駅
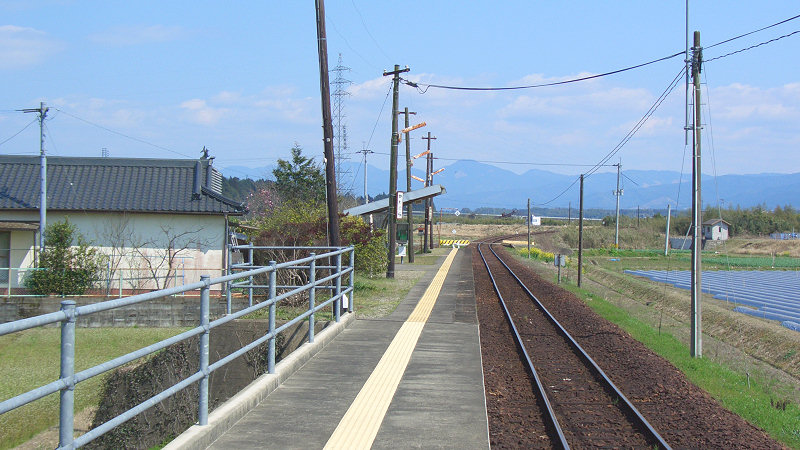
- when Kawamura Station

General information
- Location: Sagara; Kumamoto Prefecture; Japan
- Coordinates: 32°12′26.29″N 130°47′43.33″E
- Operator: Kumagawa Railroad
- Line: ■ Yunomae Line

Other information
- Station code: 3

History
- Opened: 15 July 1953

Passengers
- FY2018: 5 per day
Location
- Location within Japan

Sagara-Toshima Station (相良十島駅, Sagaratoshima eki) is a railway station in Sagara Town, Kuma District, Kumamoto Prefecture, Japan. It is on the Kumagawa Railroad Yunomae Line. The station opened on 15 July 1953.

== History ==
The station opened on 15 July 1953 under Japanese National Railways. Its original name was Kawamura Station (川村駅, Kawamura eki). It was then transferred to JR Kyushu on 1 April 1987 following the privatization of JNR. It was then finally transferred to the Kumagawa Railway on 1 October 1989.

On 6 July 2020, all services at Yunomae Line, including this station were suspended due to severe damage caused by the rainfall, including the complete destruction of a large bridge over the Kuma River. On 20 September 2026, this station was relocated to a different location after the flood and hence renamed Sagara-Toshima.

== Lines/Layout ==
The station is served by the Kumagawa Railroad Yunomae Line. The station has 1 track serving both directions with 1 side platform.

== Adjacent Stations ==
←	Service	→
Kumagawa Railroad Yunomae Line
Sagarahan-Ganjōji	Local	Higo-Nishinomura

== See also ==
- List of railway stations in Japan
