= Kawamura Station =

Kawamura Station may refer to:

- Kawamura Station (Aichi), a guided bus station in Aichi Prefecture, Japan
- Kawamura Station (Kumamoto), a railway station in Kumamoto Prefecture, Japan on the Yunomae Line
