= Hitoyoshi =

Hitoyoshi 人吉市
- City
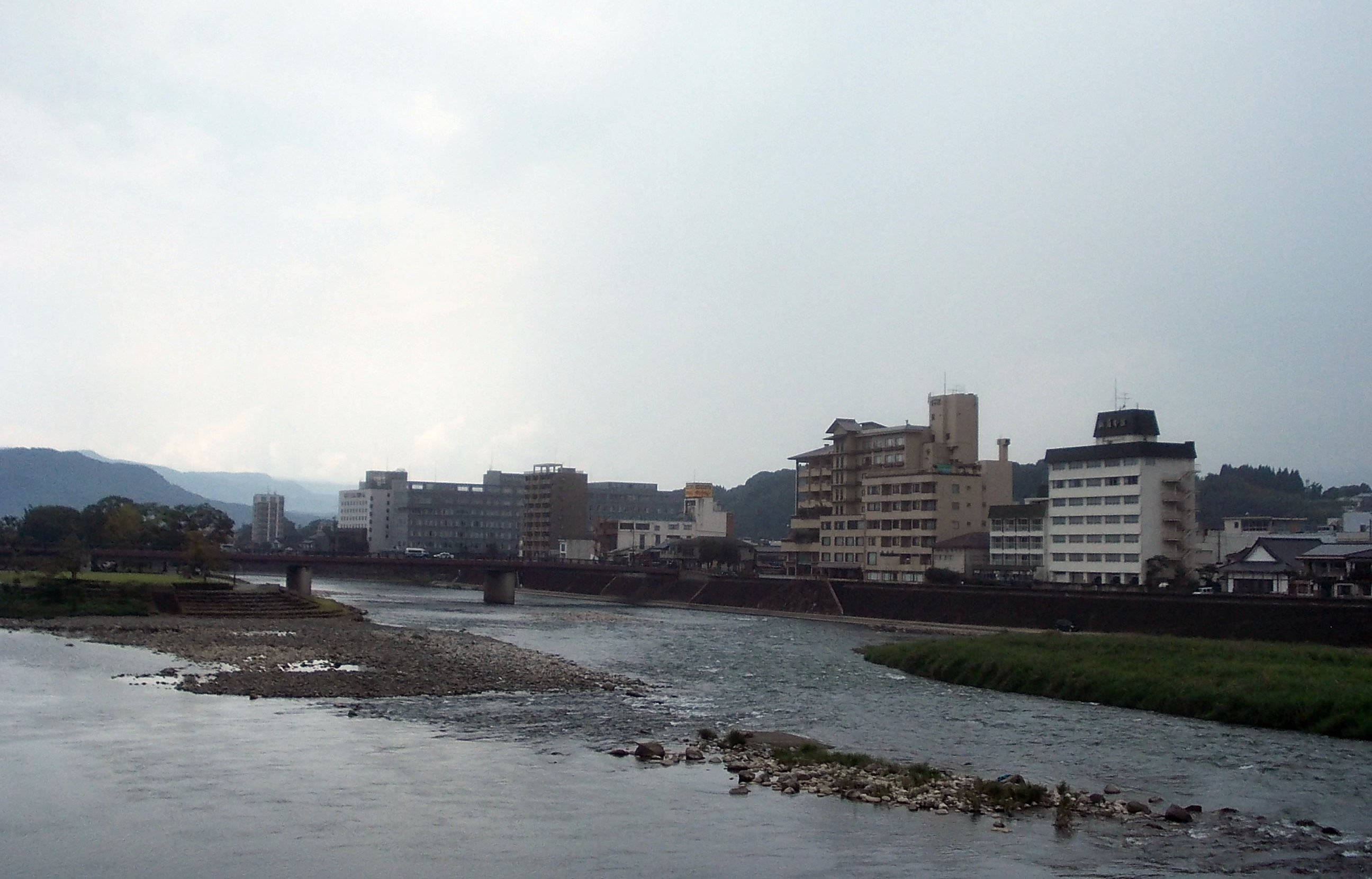
- Kuma River running through the city

- Flag Emblem

- Location in Japan
- Coordinates: 32°12′37″N 130°45′45″E
- Country: Japan
- Region: Kyushu
- Prefecture: Kumamoto

Government
  - Mayor: Hayato Matsuoka

Area
  - Total: 210.55 km^{2} (81.29 sq mi)

Population (April 31, 2024)
  - Total: 29,842
  - Density: 141.73/km^{2} (367.09/sq mi)
- Time zone: UTC+09:00 (JST)
- City hall address: 1578-1, Shimo-shiromoto-machi, Hitoyoshi-shi, Kumamoto-ken 868-8601
- Climate: Cfa
- Website: Official website
- Symbols
- Bird: Japanese bush-warbler
- Flower: Ume
- Tree: Oak

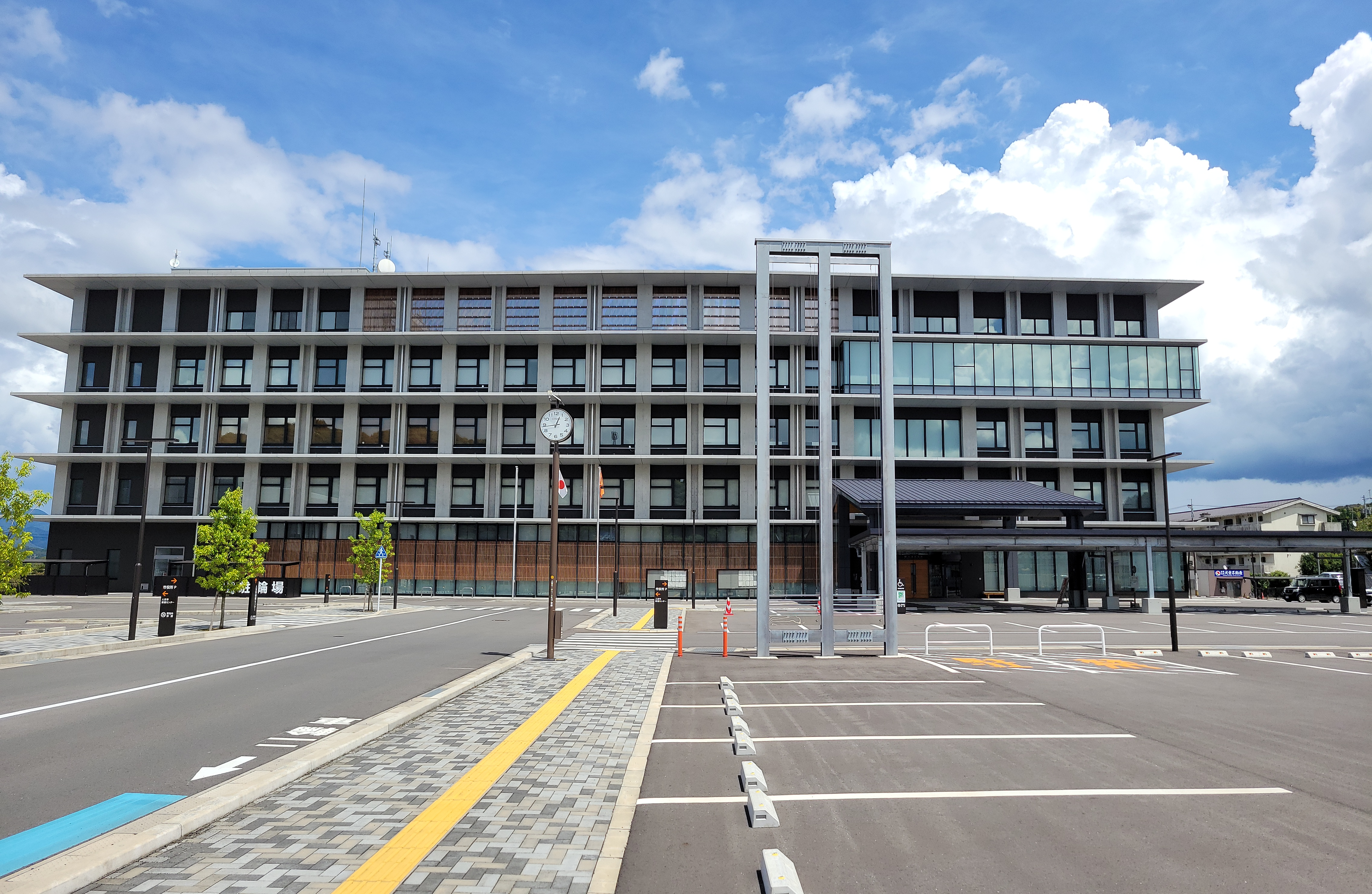
Hitoyoshi City Hall

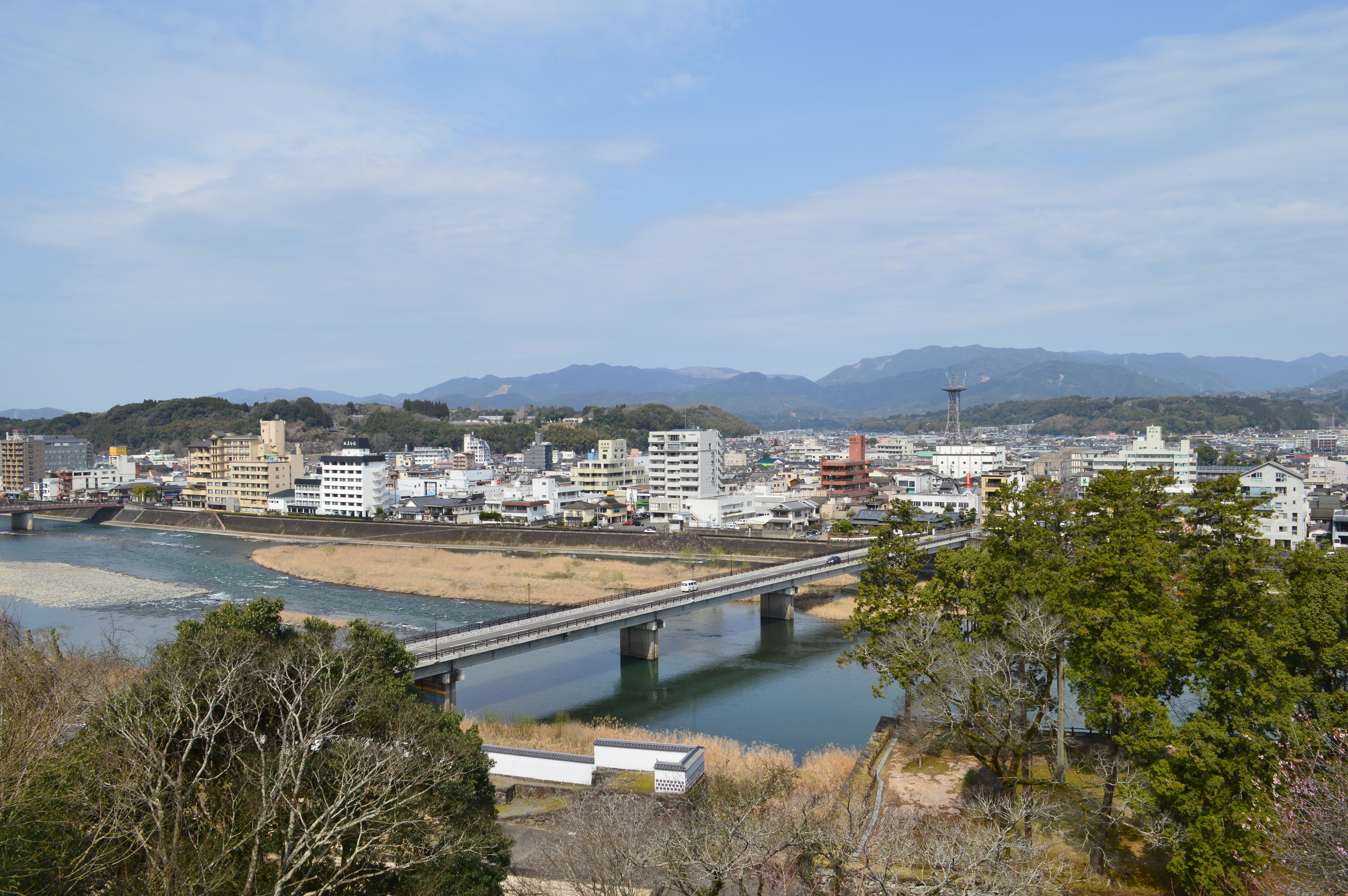
Panorama of Hitoyoshi and Kuma River from Hitoyoshi Castle

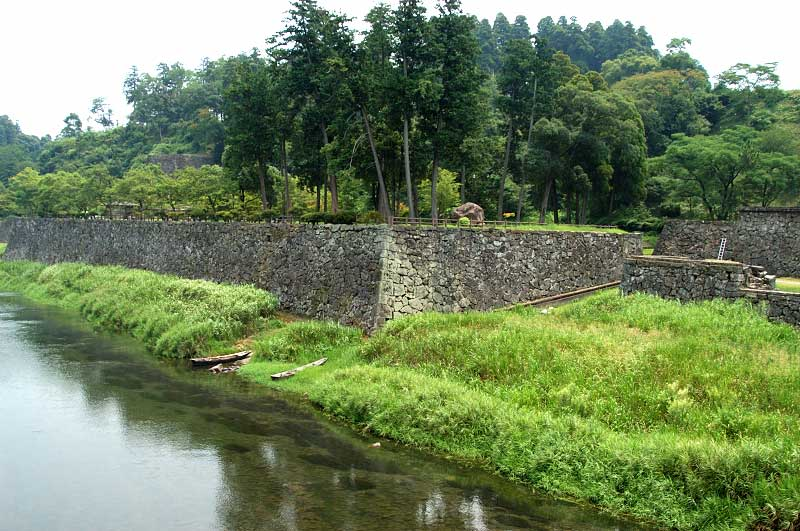
Hitoyoshi Castle ruins

Hitoyoshi (Japanese: 人吉市, Hepburn: Hitoyoshi-shi) is a city in Kumamoto Prefecture, Japan. As of 31 August 2024, the city had an estimated population of 29,842 in 15292 households, and a population density of 140 persons per km^{2}. The total area of the city is 210.55 km^{2} (81.29 sq mi).

== Geography ==
Hitoyoshi is located about 70 kilometers due south of the prefectural capital of Kumamoto City in a straight line and is the southernmost part of Kumamoto Prefecture. The northern and southern parts of the city are mountainous, forming part of the Kyushu Mountains. The southern part of the city is also mountainous, with an elevation of about 1,000 meters, and borders Miyazaki Prefecture and Kagoshima Prefecture. The city center is at the western edge of the Hitoyoshi Basin, with the Kuma River running through it from east to west

=== Neighboring municipalities ===
Kagoshima Prefecture

- Isa

Kumamoto Prefecture

- Nishiki
- Kuma
- Sagara
- Yamae

Miyazaki Prefecture

- Ebino

== Climate ==
Hitoyoshi has a humid subtropical climate (Köppen climate classification Cfa) with hot summers and cool winters. Precipitation is significant throughout the year, and is heavier in the summer months, especially June and July. The average annual temperature in Hitoyoshi is 14.7 °C. The average annual rainfall is 2283 mm with September as the wettest month. The temperatures are highest on average in August, at around 25.0 °C, and lowest in January, at around 3.7 °C.

Climate data for Hitoyoshi (1991−2020 normals, extremes 1943−present)
Month	Jan	Feb	Mar	Apr	May	Jun	Jul	Aug	Sep	Oct	Nov	Dec	Year
Record high °C (°F)	22.3 (72.1)	24.0 (75.2)	27.4 (81.3)	30.4 (86.7)	34.0 (93.2)	35.8 (96.4)	38.5 (101.3)	39.2 (102.6)	36.4 (97.5)	33.5 (92.3)	27.6 (81.7)	22.7 (72.9)	39.2 (102.6)
Mean maximum °C (°F)	16.9 (62.4)	19.9 (67.8)	23.7 (74.7)	28.0 (82.4)	31.1 (88.0)	32.3 (90.1)	35.1 (95.2)	35.3 (95.5)	33.4 (92.1)	29.5 (85.1)	24.3 (75.7)	18.5 (65.3)	35.7 (96.3)
Mean daily maximum °C (°F)	10.3 (50.5)	12.4 (54.3)	16.1 (61.0)	21.3 (70.3)	25.5 (77.9)	27.3 (81.1)	31.2 (88.2)	32.3 (90.1)	29.4 (84.9)	24.4 (75.9)	18.1 (64.6)	12.2 (54.0)	21.7 (71.1)
Daily mean °C (°F)	4.7 (40.5)	6.2 (43.2)	9.8 (49.6)	14.6 (58.3)	19.1 (66.4)	22.4 (72.3)	26.1 (79.0)	26.6 (79.9)	23.6 (74.5)	18.0 (64.4)	11.9 (53.4)	6.3 (43.3)	15.8 (60.4)
Mean daily minimum °C (°F)	0.2 (32.4)	1.0 (33.8)	4.5 (40.1)	8.9 (48.0)	13.7 (56.7)	18.7 (65.7)	22.4 (72.3)	22.8 (73.0)	19.5 (67.1)	13.3 (55.9)	7.3 (45.1)	1.9 (35.4)	11.2 (52.1)
Mean minimum °C (°F)	−5.3 (22.5)	−4.8 (23.4)	−2.6 (27.3)	1.1 (34.0)	7.4 (45.3)	13.3 (55.9)	19.3 (66.7)	19.6 (67.3)	13.4 (56.1)	6.5 (43.7)	0.1 (32.2)	−4.0 (24.8)	−6.0 (21.2)
Record low °C (°F)	−9.8 (14.4)	−9.1 (15.6)	−6.1 (21.0)	−3.5 (25.7)	3.0 (37.4)	7.8 (46.0)	15.0 (59.0)	15.3 (59.5)	7.4 (45.3)	−0.4 (31.3)	−4.2 (24.4)	−7.8 (18.0)	−9.8 (14.4)
Average precipitation mm (inches)	75.4 (2.97)	109.0 (4.29)	160.7 (6.33)	177.8 (7.00)	215.6 (8.49)	560.9 (22.08)	491.0 (19.33)	226.3 (8.91)	229.3 (9.03)	108.8 (4.28)	96.9 (3.81)	83.3 (3.28)	2,535 (99.8)
Average snowfall cm (inches)	2 (0.8)	2 (0.8)	0 (0)	0 (0)	0 (0)	0 (0)	0 (0)	0 (0)	0 (0)	0 (0)	0 (0)	1 (0.4)	5 (2)
Average rainy days (≥ 1.0 mm)	8.0	9.0	11.5	10.5	9.7	15.9	14.0	12.2	10.6	7.2	8.5	8.2	125.3
Average snowy days (≥ 1 cm)	0.6	0.5	0	0	0	0	0	0	0	0	0	0.1	1.2
Average relative humidity (%)	76	74	73	72	73	81	81	79	80	79	82	80	78
Mean monthly sunshine hours	123.0	133.9	161.6	175.8	182.1	117.1	167.2	183.5	156.5	163.6	125.6	118.6	1,808.5
Source: Japan Meteorological Agency

=== Demographics ===
Per Japanese census data, the population of Hitoyoshi is as shown below

Historical population
Year	Pop.	±%
1940	32,890	—
1950	45,169	+37.3%
1960	47,259	+4.6%
1970	42,196	−10.7%
1980	42,236	+0.1%
1990	40,173	−4.9%
2000	38,814	−3.4%
2010	35,611	−8.3%
2020	31,108	−12.6%

== History ==
The area of Hitoyoshi was part of ancient Higo Province. From the Kamakura period it was under the control of the Sagara clan, which continued to rule as daimyō of Hitoyoshi Domain through the end of the Edo Period. Hitoyoshi Castle and much of the castle town were destroyed in a fire in 1862. The town of Hitoyoshi was established with the creation of the modern municipalities system on April 1, 1889. On February 11, 1942, Hitoyoshi merged with the villages of Nishise, Nakahara, and Aida to form the city of Hitoyoshi.

== Government ==
Hitoyoshi has a mayor-council form of government with a directly elected mayor and a unicameral city council of 18 members. Hitoyoshi contributes one member to the Kumamoto Prefectural Assembly. In terms of national politics, the city is part of the Kumamoto 4th district of the lower house of the Diet of Japan.

== Economy ==
Hitoyoshi is a regional commercial center and transportation hub. Important sectors of the local economy include tourism, agriculture, and sake brewing.

== Commerce ==
Hitoyoshi's main product is rice shōchū (an indigenous spirit distilled from rice), or kuma-shōchū, which is the official name of rice shōchū produced in Kumamoto's Hitoyoshi and Kuma District. This shōchū must be produced in these areas from Japanese rice and with water from the Kuma River, which runs through the town. The World Trade Organization granted kuma-shōchū geographical indication status in 1994. The most popular brand is Hakutake Shiro, which currently holds 50% market share on all rice shōchū sold in Japan. However, Takahashi Distillery, the producer of Hakutake Shiro, is just one of 28 distilleries in Hitoyoshi in the surrounding region that produce kuma-shōchū.

== Education ==
Hitoyoshi has six public elementary schools and three public junior high schools operated by the city government and two public high schools operated by the Kumamoto Prefectural Board of Education.

== Transportation ==
=== Railways ===
JR Kyushu - Hisatsu Line

■ Nishi-Hitoyoshi - Hitoyoshi - Okoba - Yatake <currently suspended>

Kumagawa Railroad - Yunomae Line

■ Hitoyoshi-Onsen - Sagarahan-Ganjōji

=== Highways ===
- Kyushu Expressway: Hitoyoshi IC - Hitoyoshi-Kuma IC
- National Route 219
- National Route 221
- National Route 267
- National Route 445

== Sister city relations ==
- - Abrantes, Portugal, since September 2009

== Local attractions ==
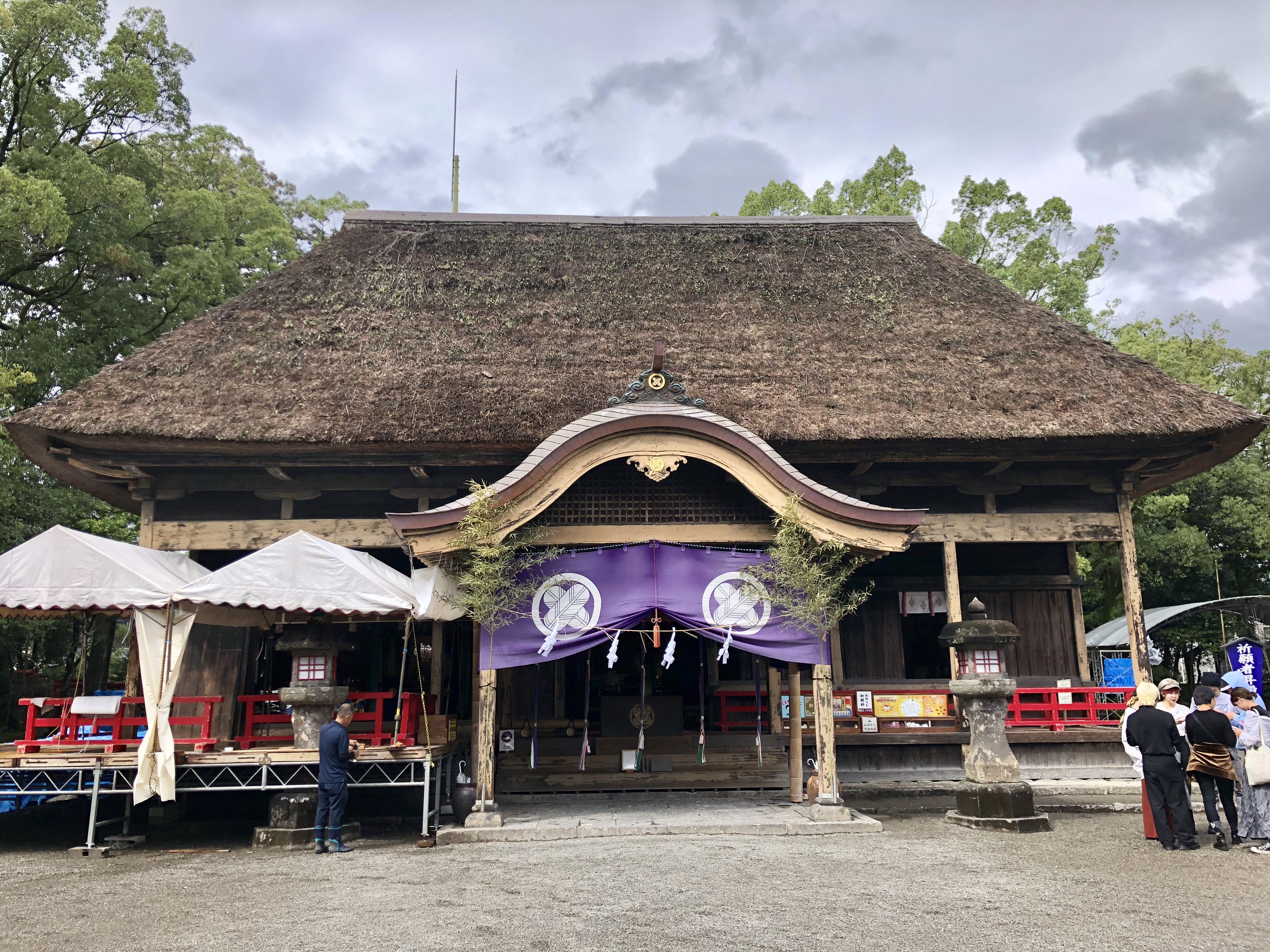
Aoi Aso Shrine in Hitoyoshi

- Aoi Aso Shrine
- Eikoku-ji
- Hitoyoshi Castle
- Hitoyoshi Station
- Kuma River
- Kuma River rafting
- Sekaiichi Chiisana Bijutsukan Chobit
- SL Hitoyoshi

== In popular culture ==
Hitoyoshi is the inspiration for and setting of "Ohitoyo" in the anime Rail Romanesque and the visual novel game that the anime is derived from. The setting for Natsume's Book of Friends is also based on Hitoyoshi.

== Notable people from Hitoyoshi ==
- Tetsuharu Kawakami, baseball player and manager
- Miki Tori, manga artist
- Teruyoshi Uchimura, comedian

== See also ==
- 2020 Kyushu floods
