= Okoba Station =

Railway station in Hitoyoshi, Kumamoto Prefecture, Japan

Okoba Station 大畑駅
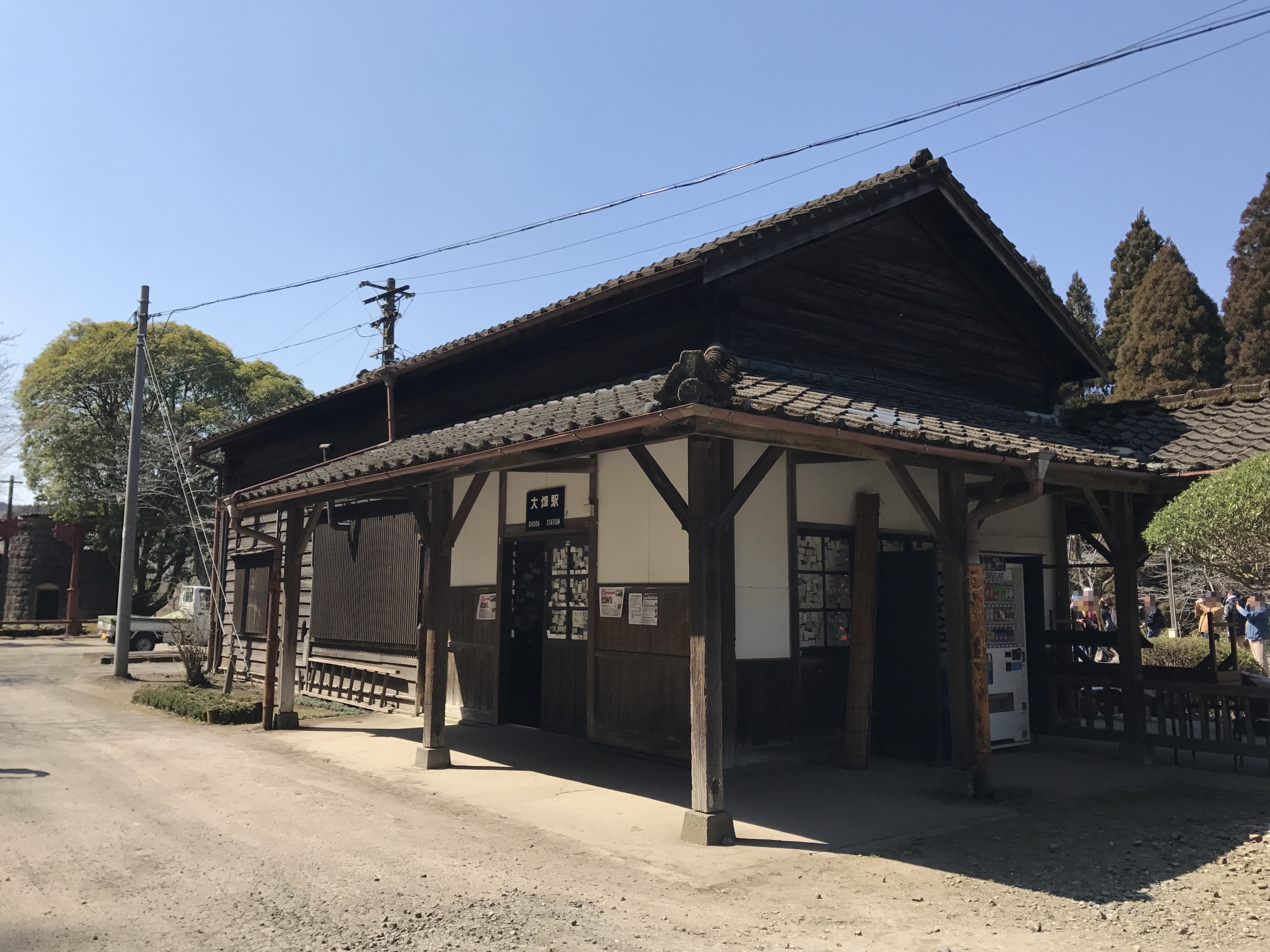
- Okoba Station in March 2017

General information
- Location: Okobafumoto-machi, Hitoyoshi, Japan; Kumamoto Prefecture （熊本県人吉市大畑麓町） Japan
- Coordinates: 32°9′53.8″N 130°47′16.2″E
- Operator: JR Kyushu
- Line: ■ Hisatsu Line

Other information
- Website: Official website

History
- Opened: 26 December 1909
Location
- Location within Japan

Okoba Station (大畑駅, Okoba-eki) is a railway station on the Hisatsu Line in Hitoyoshi, Kumamoto Prefecture, Japan, operated by Kyushu Railway Company (JR Kyushu). The station opened December 26 1909.

== Lines ==
Okoba Station is served by the Hisatsu Line. The station is located in a zig zag and also a spiral.

== Adjacent stations ==
←	Service	→
Hisatsu Line
Hitoyoshi	Local	Yatake

== Gallery ==
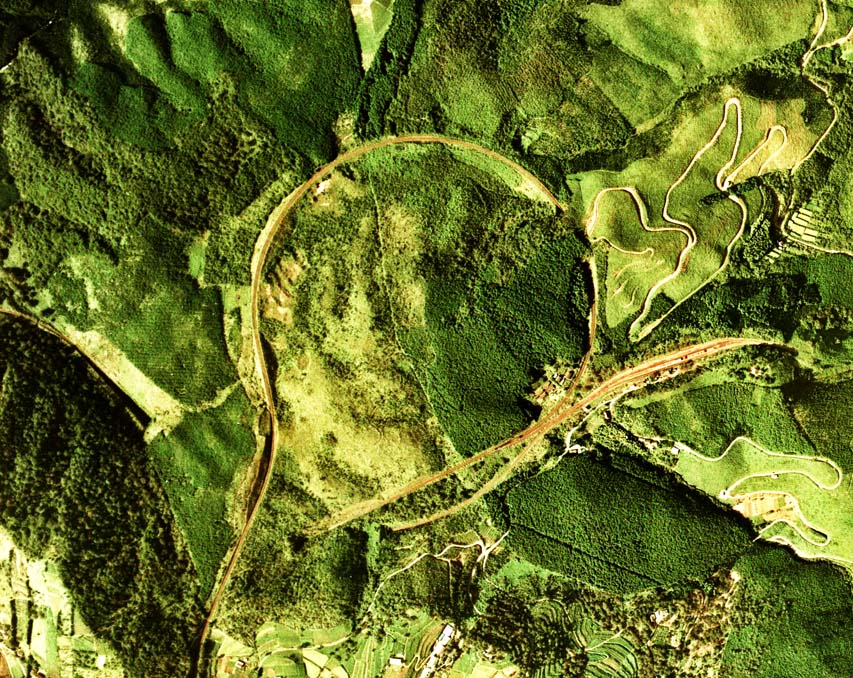
Aerial photo of Okoba spiral and zig zag

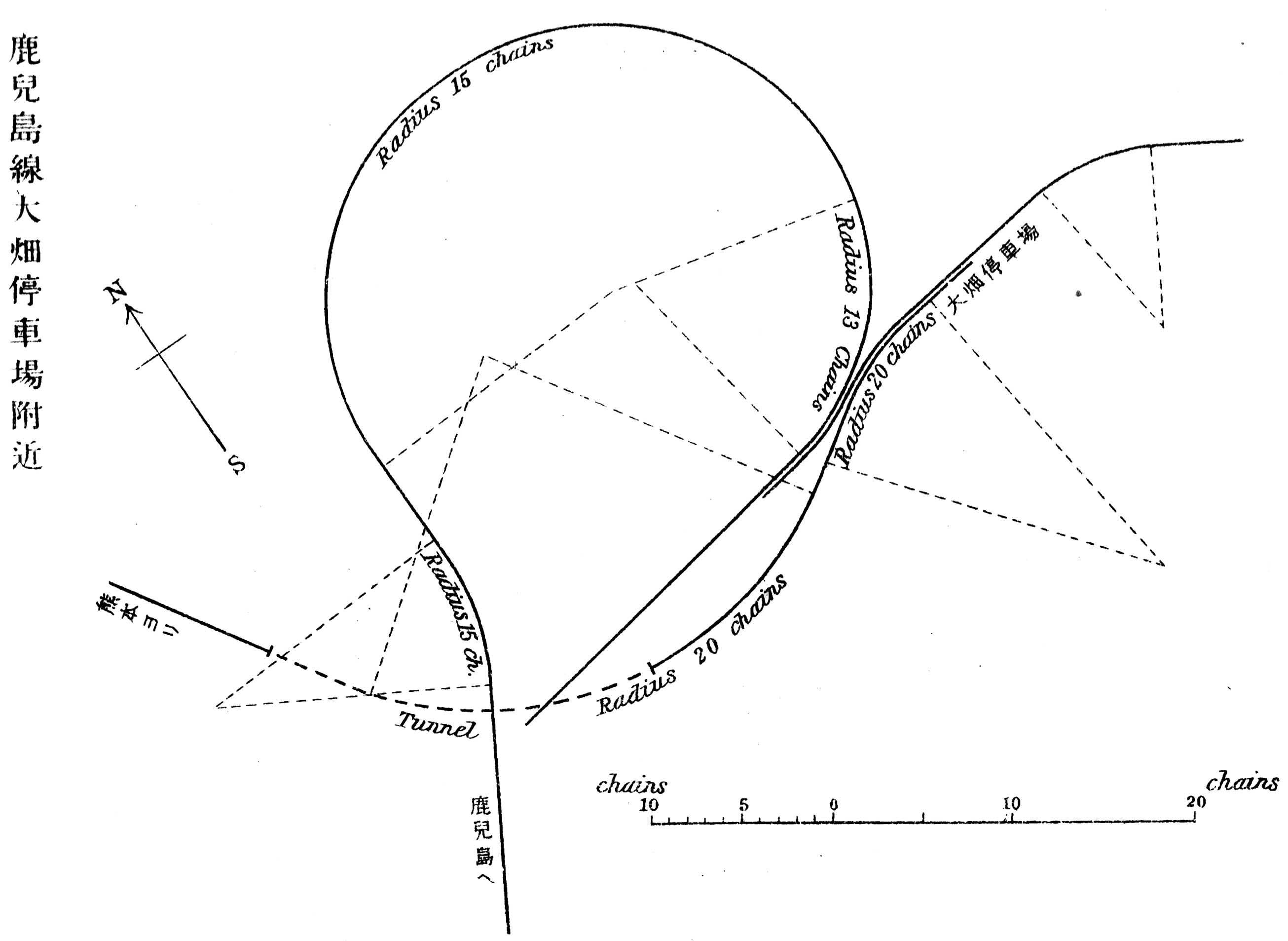
Plan of the line with a zig zag and a spiral

== See also ==
- List of railway stations in Japan
