= Sagarahan-Ganjōji Station =

Railway station in Hitoyoshi, Kumamoto Prefecture, Japan

Sagarahan-Ganjōji Station 相良藩願成寺駅
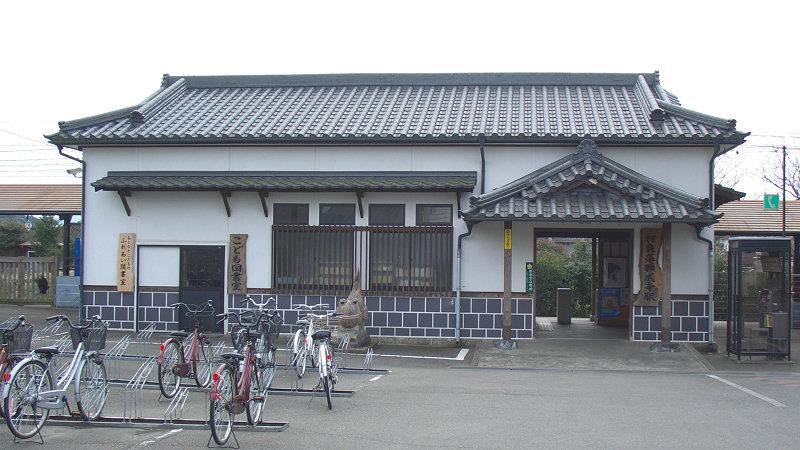
- Sagarahan-Ganjōji Station

General information
- Location: Hitoyoshi; Kumamoto Prefecture; Japan
- Coordinates: 32°13′6.29″N 130°46′10.43″E
- Operator: Kumagawa Railroad
- Line: ■ Yunomae Line

Other information
- Station code: 2

History
- Opened: 1 April 1937

Passengers
- FY2018: 347 per day
Location
- Location within Japan

Sagarahan-Ganjōji Station (相良藩願成寺駅, Sagarahan ganjōji eki) is a railway station in Hitoyoshi, Kumamoto Prefecture, Japan. It is on the Kumagawa Railroad Yunomae Line. The station opened on 1 April 1937.

== History ==
- 1 April 1937 - The station opened under the control of the Japanese Government Railway (JGR) as Higashi Hitoyoshi station.
- 1 June 1949 - JGR became the Japanese National Railways (JNR)
- 20 January 1959 - Freight services stopped on the line
- 1 April 1987 - JNR becomes privatized, and the station comes under the control of the newly created Kyushu Railway Company (JR Kyushu)
- 10 October 1989 - The Yunomae Line was transferred to the newly incorporated third-sector railroad, Kumagawa Railway. The station was also renamed to its current name.
- 23 April 1992 - The station was renovated.

== Lines/Layout ==
The station is served by the Kumagawa Railroad Yunomae Line. The station has 1 track serving both directions with 1 side platform. The station was renovated in 1997.

== Passenger stats ==
Year	Daily Passengers	Daily Boarding and Alighting
2011	345	683
2012	343	682
2013	355	707
2014	340	674
2015	323	642
2016	393	642
2017	341	773
2018	347	691

== Adjacent Stations ==
←	Service	→
Kumagawa Railroad Yunomae Line
Hitoyoshi-Onsen	Local	Sagara-Toshima

== See also ==
- List of railway stations in Japan
