= Nishi-Hitoyoshi Station =

Railway station in Hitoyoshi, Kumamoto Prefecture, Japan

Nishi-Hitoyoshi Station 西人吉駅
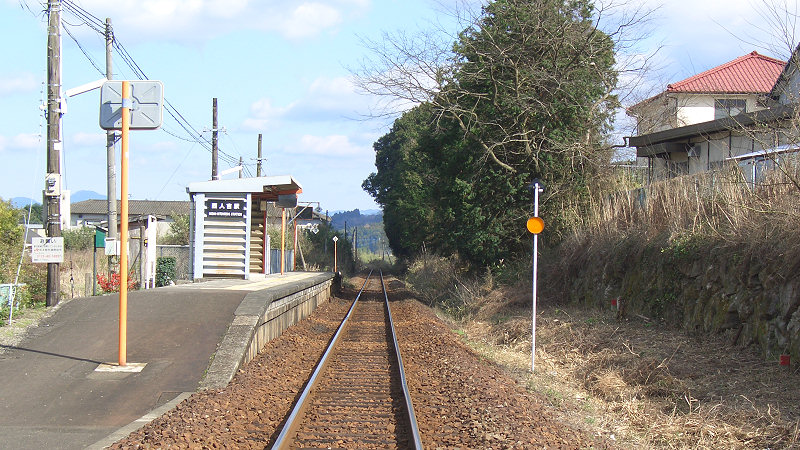
- Nishi-Hitoyoshi Station in March 2007

General information
- Location: Hitoyoshi; Kumamoto Prefecture; Japan
- Coordinates: 32°13′43″N 130°43′32″E
- Operator: JR Kyushu
- Line: ■ Hisatsu Line
- Platforms: 1 side platform
- Tracks: 1

Other information
- Website: Official website

History
- Opened: 1952
Location
- Location within Japan

Nishi-Hitoyoshi Station (西人吉駅, Nishi-Hitoyoshi-eki) is a railway station on the Hisatsu Line in Hitoyoshi, Kumamoto, Japan, operated by Kyushu Railway Company (JR Kyushu).

== Lines ==
Nishi-Hitoyoshi Station is served by the Hisatsu Line.

== Layout ==
The station has a single side platform serving one bi-directional track.

== Adjacent stations ==
←	Service	→
Hisatsu Line
Watari	Local	Hitoyoshi

== See also ==
- List of railway stations in Japan
