= Hitoyoshi Station =

Railway station in Hitoyoshi, Kumamoto Prefecture, Japan

Hitoyoshi Station 人吉駅
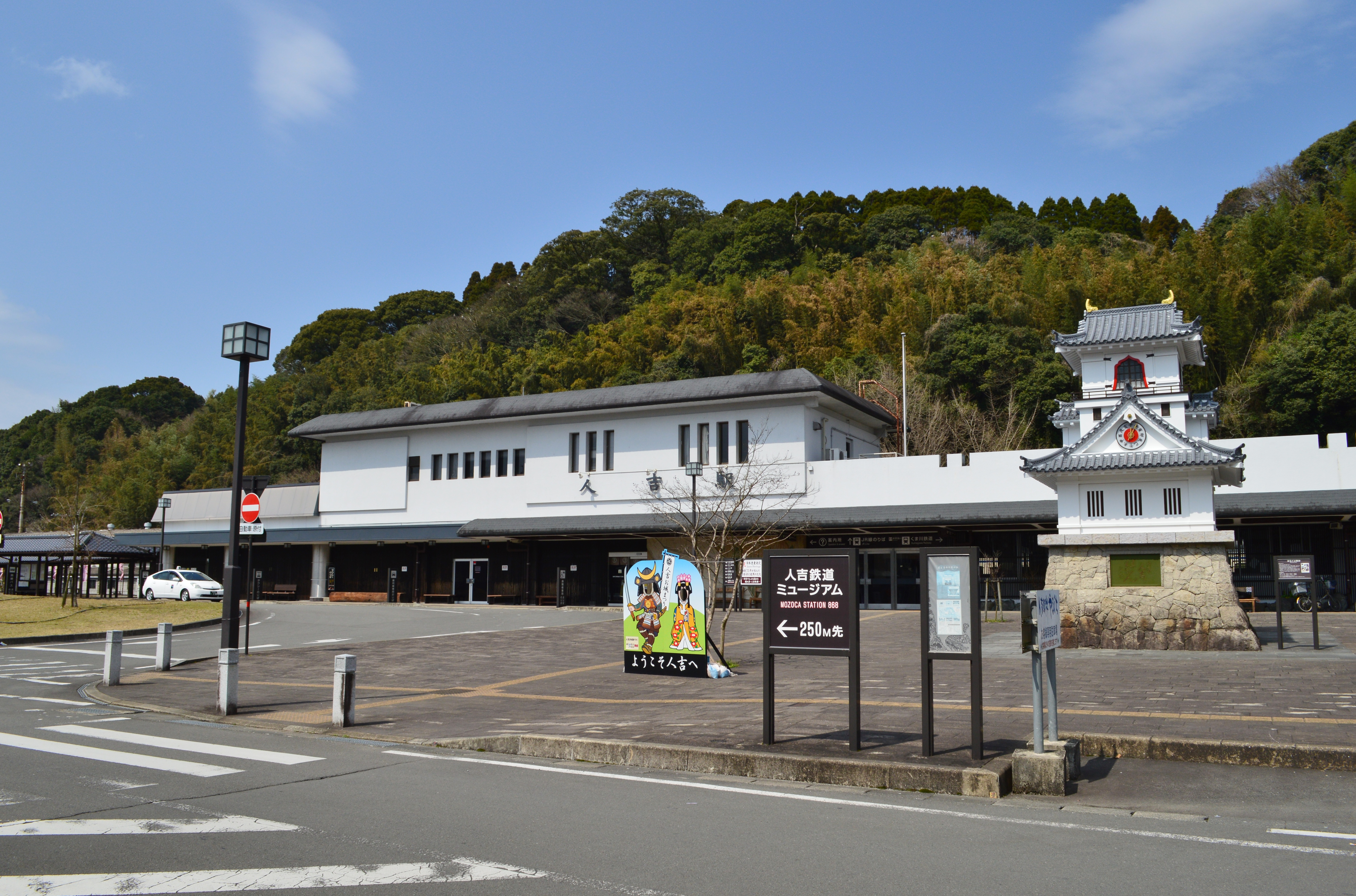
- Hitoyoshi Station in March 2018

General information
- Other names: Hitoyoshi-Onsen Station
- Location: Hitoyoshi; Kumamoto Prefecture; Japan
- Coordinates: 32°12′57″N 130°45′13″E
- Operator: JR Kyushu; Kumagawa Railroad
- Lines: ■ Hisatsu Line; ■ Yunomae Line

Other information
- Website: Official website

History
- Opened: 1909
Location
- Location within Japan

Hitoyoshi Station (人吉駅, Hitoyoshi-eki) is a railway station on the Hisatsu Line and Yunomae Line in Hitoyoshi, Kumamoto, Japan, operated by Kyushu Railway Company (JR Kyushu) and Kumagawa Railroad.

The name of the Yunomae Line station is officially Hitoyoshi-Onsen Station (人吉温泉駅, Hitoyoshi-Onsen-eki), which was renamed from Hitoyoshi Station on April 1, 2009.

== Lines ==
Hitoyoshi Station is served by the Hisatsu Line. It is also one terminus of the Kumagawa Railroad Yunomae Line.

== Adjacent stations ==
←	Service	→
Hisatsu Line
Nishi-Hitoyoshi	Local	Okoba
Watari	SL Hitoyoshi	Terminus
Watari	Limited Express Kawasemi Yamasemi	Terminus
Terminus	Limited Express Isaburō & Shinpei	Okoba
Watari	Trans-Kyushu Limited Express	Terminus
Kumagawa Railroad Yunomae Line
Terminus	Local	Sagarahan-Ganjōji

== History ==
The station was opened on 1 June 1908 by Japanese Government Railways (JGR) as the southern terminus of a track from Yatsushiro which was designated as the Hitoyoshi Main Line on 12 October 1909. Shortly thereafter, the track was linked up with the then Kagoshima Line, which had reached north from Kagoshima through Kokubu (now Hayato) to Yoshimatsu. Through traffic was established from Mojikō in the north of Kyushu to Kagoshima in the south. The entire stretch of track from Mojikō through Yatsushiro, Hitoyoshi, Kokubu to Kagoshima was redesignated as the Kagoshima Main Line on 21 November 1909.

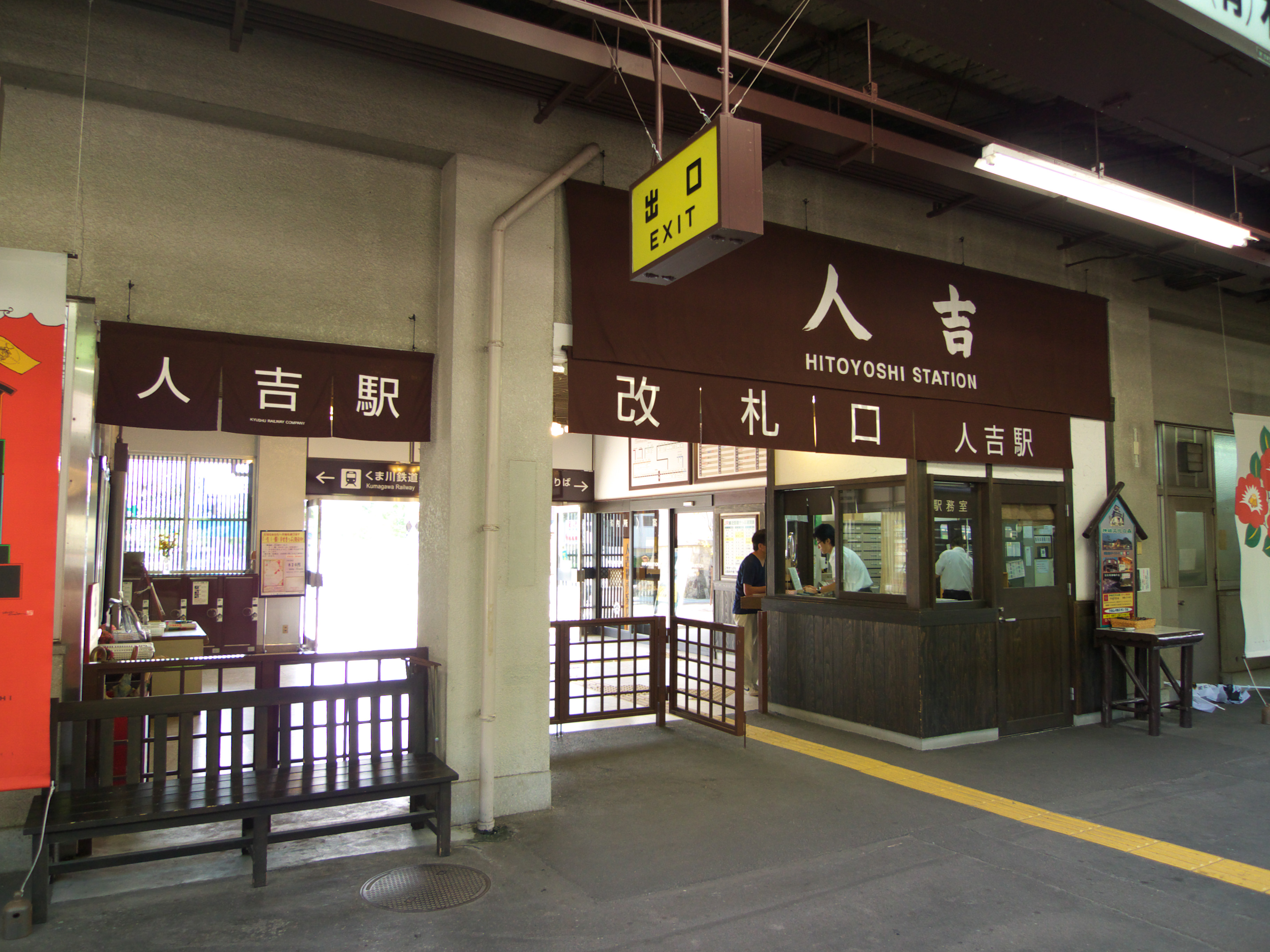
Hitoyoshi Station ticket gate

By 1927, another track from Yatsushiro through Sendai to Kagoshima had been built and this was now designated as part of the Kagoshima Main Line. The track from Yatsushiro through Hitoyoshi to Kagoshima was thus redesignated as the Hisatsu Line on 17 October 1927.

With the privatization of Japanese National Railways (JNR), the successor of JGR, on 1 April 1987, the station came under the control of JR Kyushu.

== See also ==
- List of railway stations in Japan
