= 2020 Kyushu floods =

Floods in Japan

2020 Kyushu floods 令和２年７月豪雨 (Heavy rain in July, Reiwa 2)
- Changing of rain-fall distribution in Kumamoto Prefecture (time is shown on the bottom left)
- Date: 4 July 2020 – 31 July 2020
- Location: Kumamoto and Kagoshima prefectures in the southern Japanese island of Kyushu
- Deaths: 77 confirmed
- Property damage: ¥600 billion (US$5.67 billion)

The 2020 Kyushu floods were a series of floods in July 2020 brought on when record-breaking heavy rain hit the prefectures of Kumamoto and Kagoshima, on the southern Japanese island of Kyushu, on 4 July 2020 in the middle of the East Asian rainy season. The event is officially referred to as Reiwa ni-nen shichi-gatsu gōu (令和２年７月豪雨; "Heavy rain of July, Reiwa 2") by the Japan Meteorological Agency. As a result of flooding and landslides, 77 people were confirmed dead (includes 1 death due to cardiopulmonary arrest) and approximately seven are missing. Fourteen of the victims were residents of an old age home in Kuma, Kumamoto that was flooded. Approximately 15,335 buildings were destroyed, damaged or flooded. Damage was calculated at ¥600 billion (US$5.67 billion).

== Background ==
Typhoons, storms, and heavy flooding have hit Japan hard in the years prior to 2020. Aside from Hokkaido, the entire country is subject to the East Asian rainy season, known as Tsuyu (梅雨), during the early part of summer. The mountainous terrain of Japan places it at risk for flooding and landslides. These climate events have killed hundreds of people, and expert analysis has stated global warming is a contributing cause.

The Kuma River basin had previously flooded in 1965. One of three major rapids in Japan, the Kuma is a 115-kilometer-long (71 mi) class A river. Its course begins in the mountain range in Kyushu, and runs through Hitoyoshi, Kumamoto; Kuma, Kumamoto; and Yatsushiro, Kumamoto before it discharges into the Yatsushiro Sea.

== Events ==
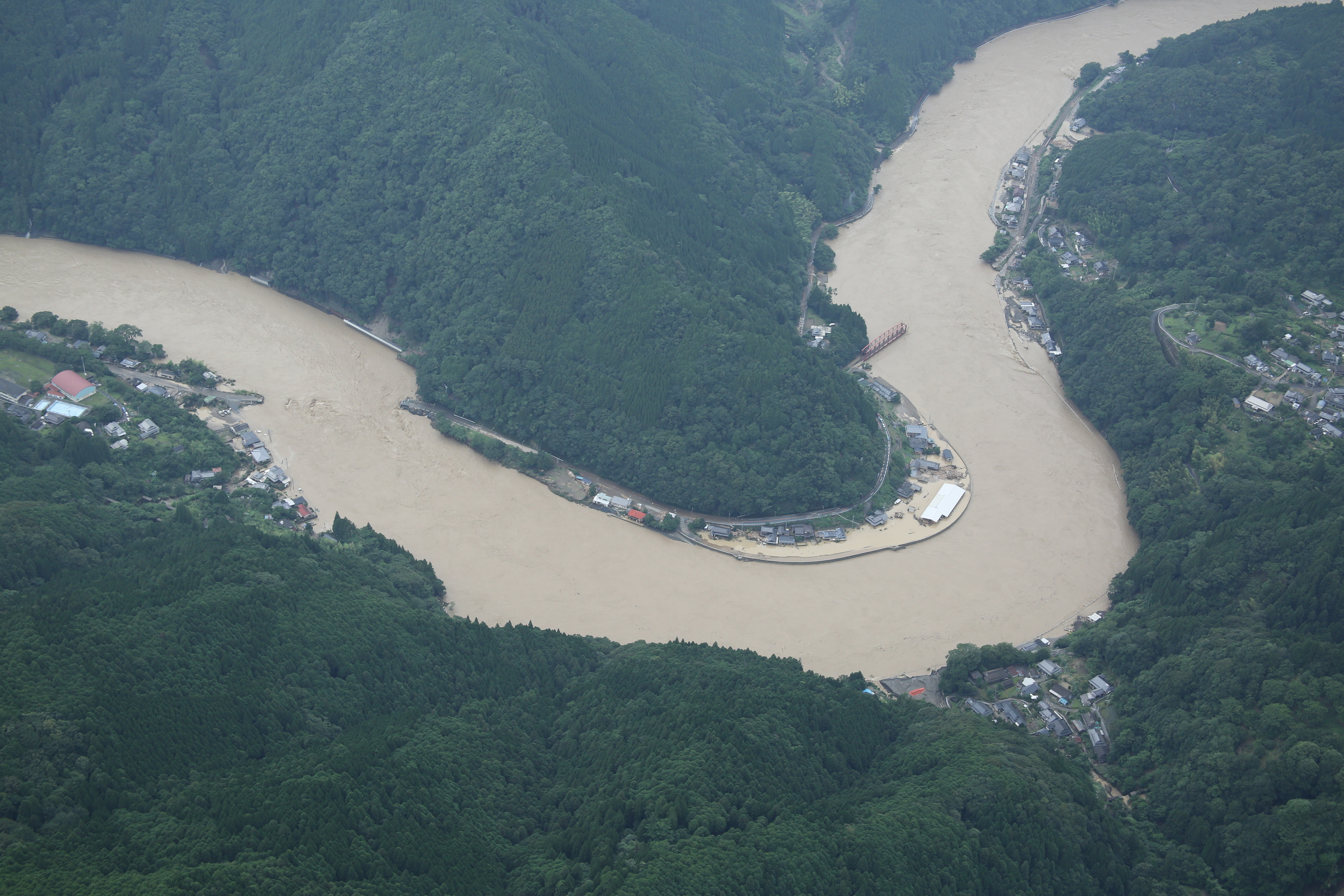
Kamase Bridge (left) and Kumagawa Railway Bridge No.1 (right) were washed away.

On 4 July 2020, heavy rain caused flooding in the southern Japanese island of Kyushu. At 5 a.m., local time (UTC+9) the Japan Meteorological Agency raised its heavy rain warning to its highest level of 3 in many parts of the prefectures, the first time it has ever done so for these areas. The Japan Meteorological Agency stated the amount of rain was record-breaking for the region and was never seen before. The rate of rainfall exceeded 100 millimeters (3.9 in) per hour.

As of 9 July 2020, 60 people are confirmed dead and approximately a dozen are reported missing. According to Kyodo News, 1.3 million people were ordered to evacuate their homes and there were 12 different landslide events.

Fourteen of the dead were residents in a flooded old age home in Kuma, Kumamoto. Kumamoto governor Ikuo Kabashima stated that scores were stranded after mud and floodwater gushed into the old age home. According to a rescue volunteer, when they reached the old age home, the water was still on the first-floor level. The rescue personnel managed to rescue residents who had made it up to the second floor but were unable to reach those left below. According to the staff at the home, they roused residents at 5 a.m. and shuffled them upstairs. On the first floor, when water came into the building, they placed residents with wheelchairs on top of tables in the dining room. The staff was unable to rescue the deceased residents after water broke through the windows and the patients floated off the tables.

Following overnight rains, authorities instructed more than 75,000 residents to evacuate in the prefectures of Kumamoto and Kagoshima. 203,200 residents were instructed to shelter in place, and 109 shelters were opened in the region.

The Kuma River overran its bank in eleven different locations and breached one levee. In Kuma, Kumamoto, stranded residents were rescued by a rescue helicopter. Eight homes were swept away in Ashikita, Kumamoto. In Tsunagi, Kumamoto, 2–3 people were pulled out of a landslide without signs of life. Some 8,000 homes were left without power in Kumamoto and Kagoshima according to the Kyushu Electric Power Company. Another 6,100 houses were estimated to be submerged, 11 bridges destroyed and 4,700 buildings destroyed, damaged or flooded.

A dike was breached near the town of Hitoyoshi, normally known for its hot springs and boating, which was flooded by the Kuma River. Volunteers from the local rafting association in Hitoyoshi used their rafts to rescue stranded residents in the flooded town. At least 17 people in Hitoyoshi died.

On the morning of 7 July, the Chikugo River overflowed in Hita, Ōita leading authorities to issue the highest level alert to residents.

== Effects ==
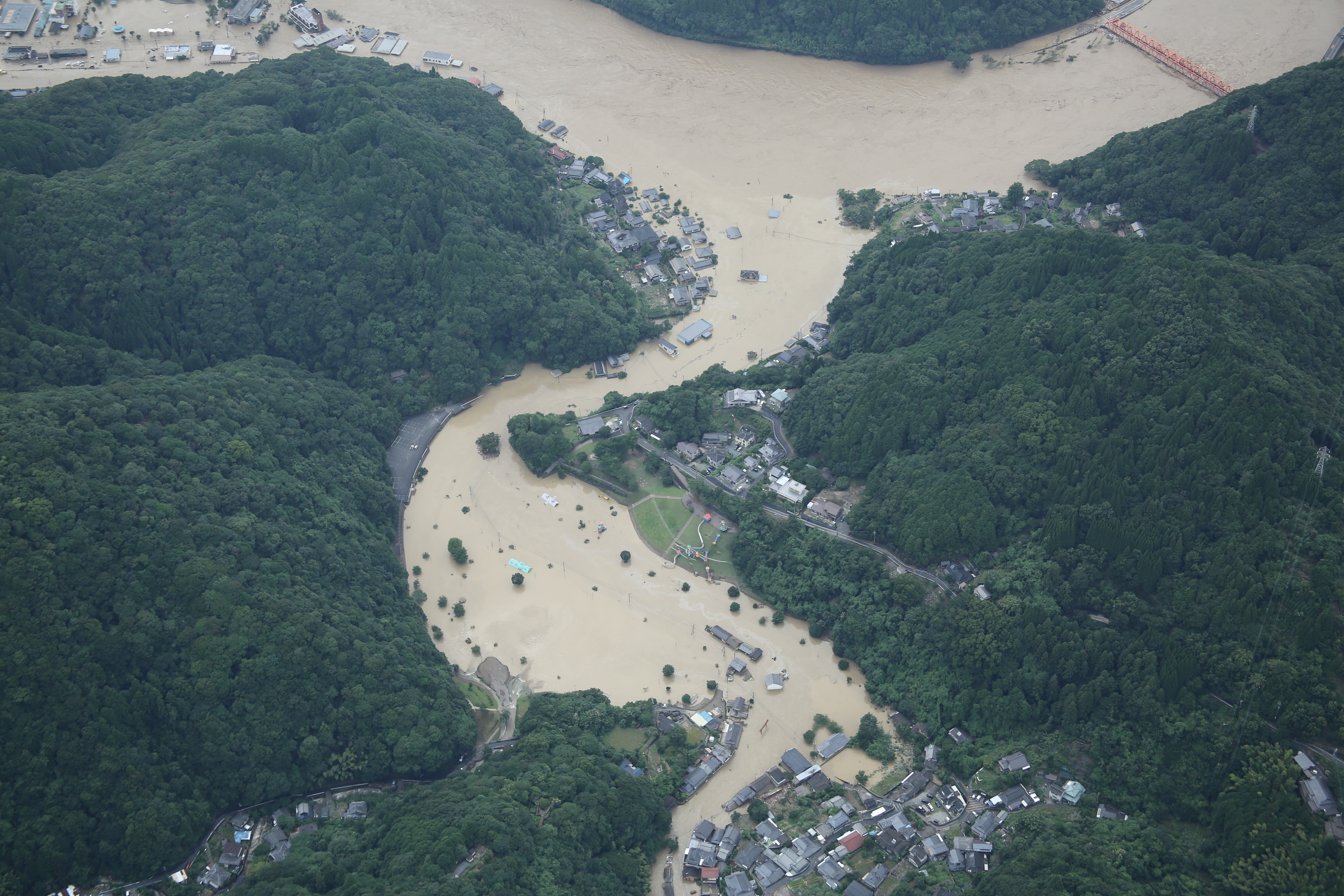
Homes submerged by the Kuma River on 4 July 2020.

The flooding has also disrupted economic activity in Kyushu, an important manufacturing area in Japan. Companies including Toyota, Canon, and Panasonic temporarily halted production in the area as a precaution for employee safety. However, Chief Cabinet Secretary Yoshihide Suga, in a statement on 6 July, said he did not expect major supply chain disruptions.

Evacuees and local officials raised concerns regarding emergency shelter given the simultaneously ongoing COVID-19 pandemic. Evacuees arriving at shelters had their temperatures checked, or were asked to go elsewhere so that social distancing could be maintained. Some evacuees chose to take refuge in their cars, while others stayed with friends. These measures follow recommendations created the previous month in June when government officials anticipated a possible "double disaster" of flooding and disease transmission.

== Government response ==
Prime Minister Shinzo Abe ordered the creation of a special task force, dispatched 10,000 Japan Self-Defense Forces troops to the area, and vowed to rescue the missing. On 5 July 2020, it was reported that 40,000 Self-Defense troops, Coast Guard sailors, and firemen were deployed in the rescue operation. On 7 July, the number of deployed SDF troops was doubled to 80,000.

On 7 July, Japanese authorities warned that further heavy rains were expected in Kyushu.

== See also ==
- 1953 North Kyushu flood
- 2018 Japan floods
- 2020 China floods
- 2020 Nepal floods
- 2020 Korean floods
