= Kuma River (Japan) =

River in Kumamoto Prefecture, Kyūshū, Japan

Coordinates: 32.5°N 130.5666667°E

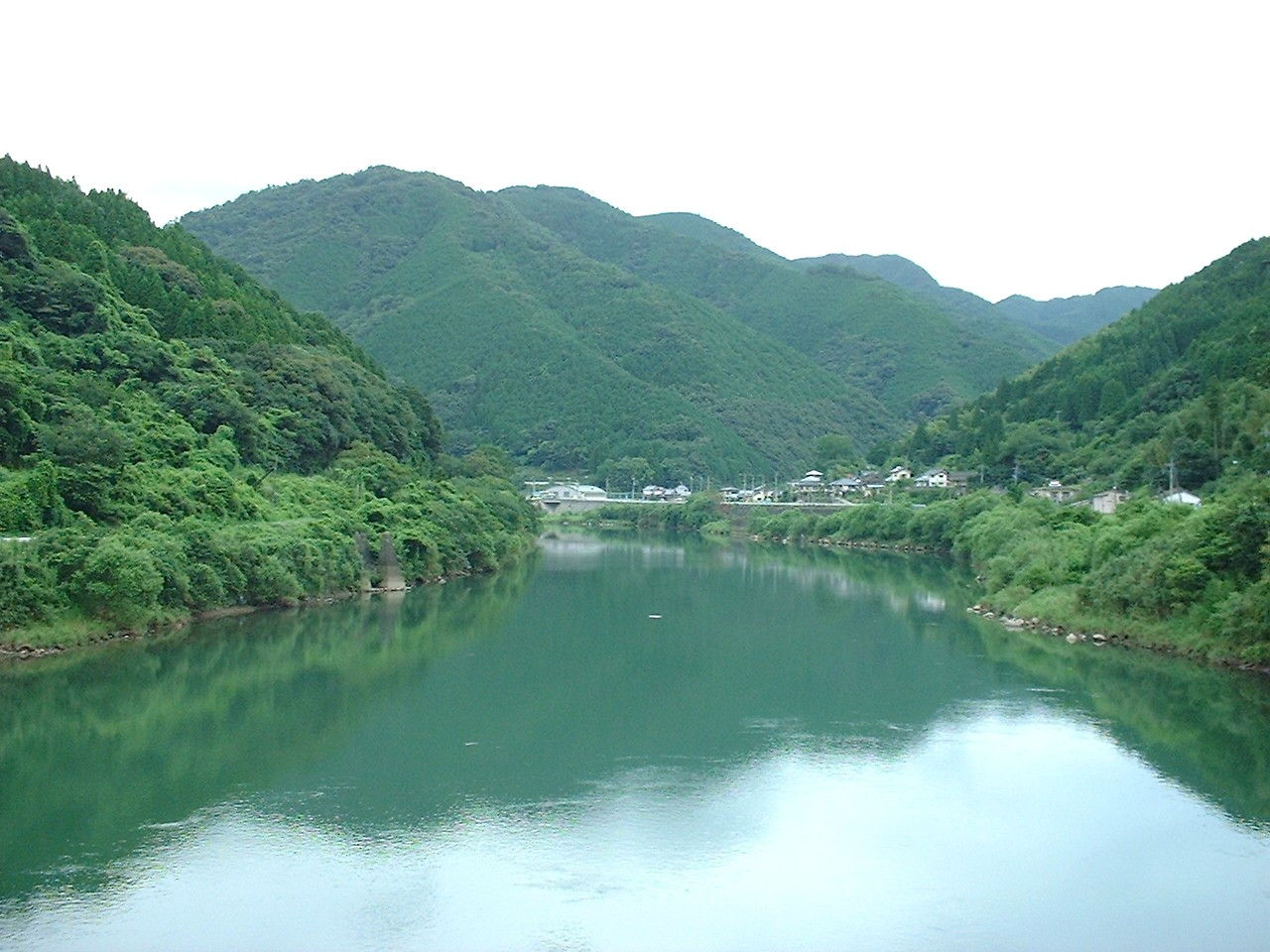
- Kuma River

- Location within Japan
- Nickname: Abaregawa (raging river)
- Native name: 球磨川 (Japanese); Kumagawa (Japanese)

Location
- Country: Japan
- Prefecture: Kumamoto

Physical characteristics
- Length: 115 km (71 mi)
- Basin size: 1880km²

The Kuma River (球磨川, Kuma-gawa) is a river in Kumamoto Prefecture, central Western part of Kyūshū, Japan. It is sometimes referred as Kumagawa River. It is the longest river in Kyushu, with the length of 115 km (71 mi) long and has a drainage area of 1,880 km^{2} (730 sq mi). The river's estuary was designated part of Japan's 500 Important Wetlands.

It is considered to be one of the three most rapid rivers of Japan (the other two being the Mogami River and the Fuji River). The Kuma River is classified as a Class A river, under the management of the Japanese government.

The Kuma River is a popular tourist spot; about 70,000 people visit every year. Tourists are attracted to Ayu fish or sweetfish which inhabits at the Kuma river and some of its tributaries, where many people especially enjoy “shaku-ayu”. The river is also used for fishing, mainly in June, and for irrigation of nearby rice fields. It then empties into the Yatsushiro Sea at Yatsushiro.

The Kuma river is also known in relation to the Arase dam due to its removal project being the first dam removal in not only Japan but the whole of Asia. In 2020, the flooding of the Kuma River was a major incident in which a number of people from nearby areas were killed or seriously injured.

== Geography ==
The Kuma River and its watershed covers nearly 25% of the entire area of Kumamoto Prefecture, and it is the largest river in the prefecture. The Kuma River begins its course from Mount Choushigasa flowing primarily through Kumamoto prefecture, leading to the Yatsushiro Bay. It is the only major and the largest river connected to the Yatsushiro sea. Before flowing into the Yatsushiro sea, where a large tidal flat is formed at its river mouth. Before flowing into the Yatsushiro sea, the Kuma River flows through the Hitoyoshi city, the Kuma village and the Yatsushiro city. The Kuma River flows through the Shimanto terrane and mainly through the Chichibu terrane. The Kuma River has 80 tributaries with its combined total length of 434 km (270 mi). One of the major tributaries of Kuma River is Kawabe River, joining Kuma river at Hitoyoshi city, Kumamoto prefecture. The sediments of Kuma River originate from the Chichibu terrane and the Higo volcanic.

The round shape of the Kuma River basin assists with water and sediment transport function. The upper stream of the Kuma River run through a steep gradient which later changes to medium gradient. It splits into multiple channels before flowing to the Yatsushiro Sea.

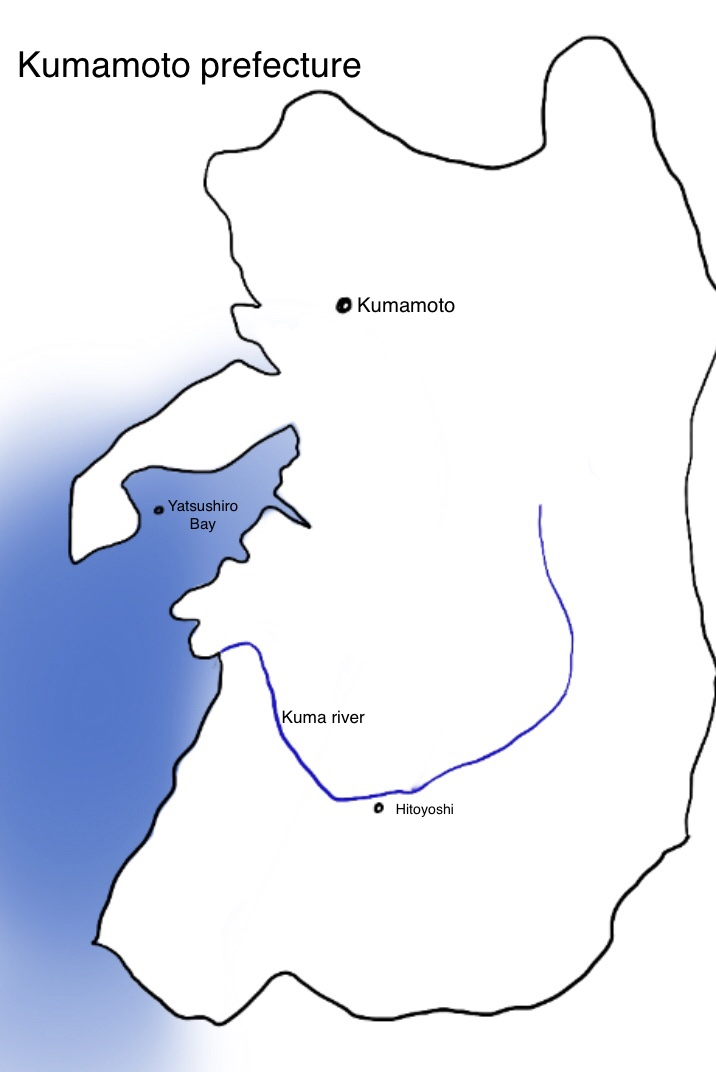
Map of Kuma River

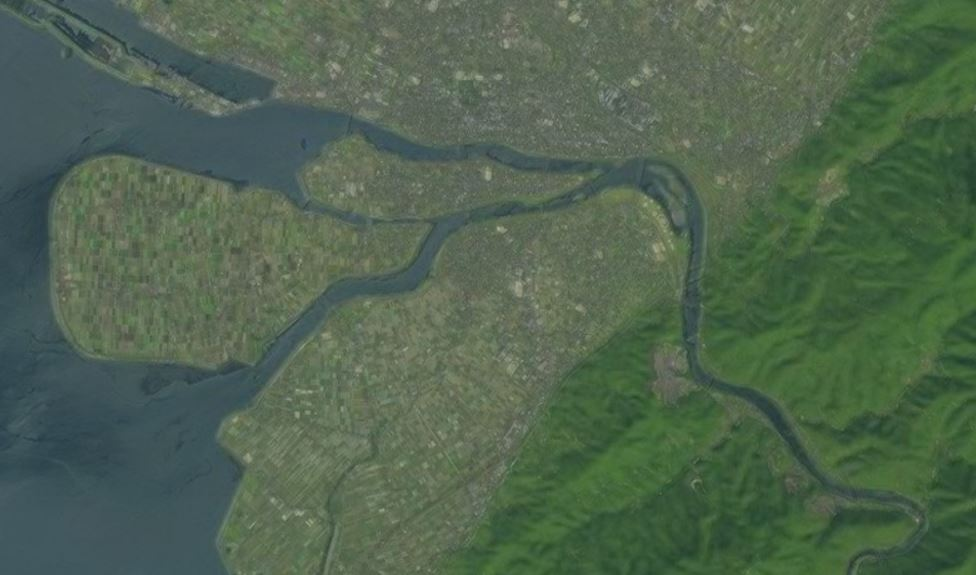
Kuma River - splits into multiple channels before flowing to Yatsushiro Sea

The Kuma River is given the nickname of “Abaregawa” (meaning raging river) by the local Japanese people, due to its fast-flowing nature. It is recognized as the three most rapid rivers in Japan, along with the Mogami River in Yamanashi prefecture and Fuji River in Nagano, Yamanashi and Shizuoka prefecture.

Other major tributaries of the Kuma River include: Kudagiri River, Yoshio River, Imo River (Japan), Mae River, Mune River, Hatomune River, and Ogawauchi River.

== History ==
Since as early as the Edo period (1603–1868), the Kuma river had a pivotal role in providing drinking water and as a source of food. Despite maintaining much of its natural landscape, the Kuma River and especially its basin area was largely impacted by human activities for economic and social development.

The landscape of the Kuma river basin was subject to change from the later 17th century for economical and social development of its neighbourhood. During this time, the Kuma river was utilised as an important site for transportation in association to business, connecting the Yatsushiro city and the Hitoyoshi city. The Kuma River was actively used by the local feudal lords (daimyo). From these periods up until the 1900s, residents of the Kuma River neighbourhood often managed woodlands which created agricultural landscapes. Starting from approximately the Meiji era (1868–1912), slash-and-burn agriculture was active, in order to produce crops, including Japanese millet, azuki beans, sweet potato and taro. Until the late 20th century, wet rice cultivation of the primary factor of forming landscapes in the lower areas of the Kuma River. People often relied on the Kuma River for wet rice cultivation.

Later in the 20th century, the landscapes of the Kuma river started to change due to constructions of large dams, including the Ichifusa dam, the Setoishi dam and the Arase dam for the purpose of controlling water-related issues such as flood.

In 1896, Japan implemented the River Act for management of water. In 1964, it was renewed for further control of water and its use, aiming to manage rivers in Japan including the Kuma River. The Kuma River is categorised as one of the A-class rivers, strictly regulated under the Japanese government. The national level administrations of Ministry of land, Infrastructure, Transport and Tourism are in charge of management of the rivers of Japan.

In 1951, The Kuma River General Development Project, also known as The Kuma River comprehensive development plan, was enacted by the government of Kumamoto Prefecture. The purpose was to control the use of hydropower by setting up 7 dams and 10 plants. 3 dams were built on the Kuma River. During the 1950s, the Kuma River gained attention of the Kumamoto prefecture when dealing with the issues the shortage of electricity supplies. The Kuma River and its watershed had a great role for developing the economy of the region by stabilising power supply.

== Natural environment ==
The Kuma River has always been the habitat of many species by maintaining its natural landscapes, although there have been cases of serious damage of the natural environment. These include construction of dams damaging the habitats of natural species, as well as deforestation of the Kuma river basin due to paper industry.

=== Species ===
Despite being the habitat of various goby species, human activities have largely impacted to an extent in which many are threatened with extinction. These goby species include, as suggested by Japanese Red List, Taeniocides cirratus, Gymnogobius cylindricus, Gymnogobius scrobiculatus, Apocryptodon punctatus, Gymnogobius macrognathos, Periophthalmus modestus, Eutaeniichthys gilli.

=== Fisheries ===
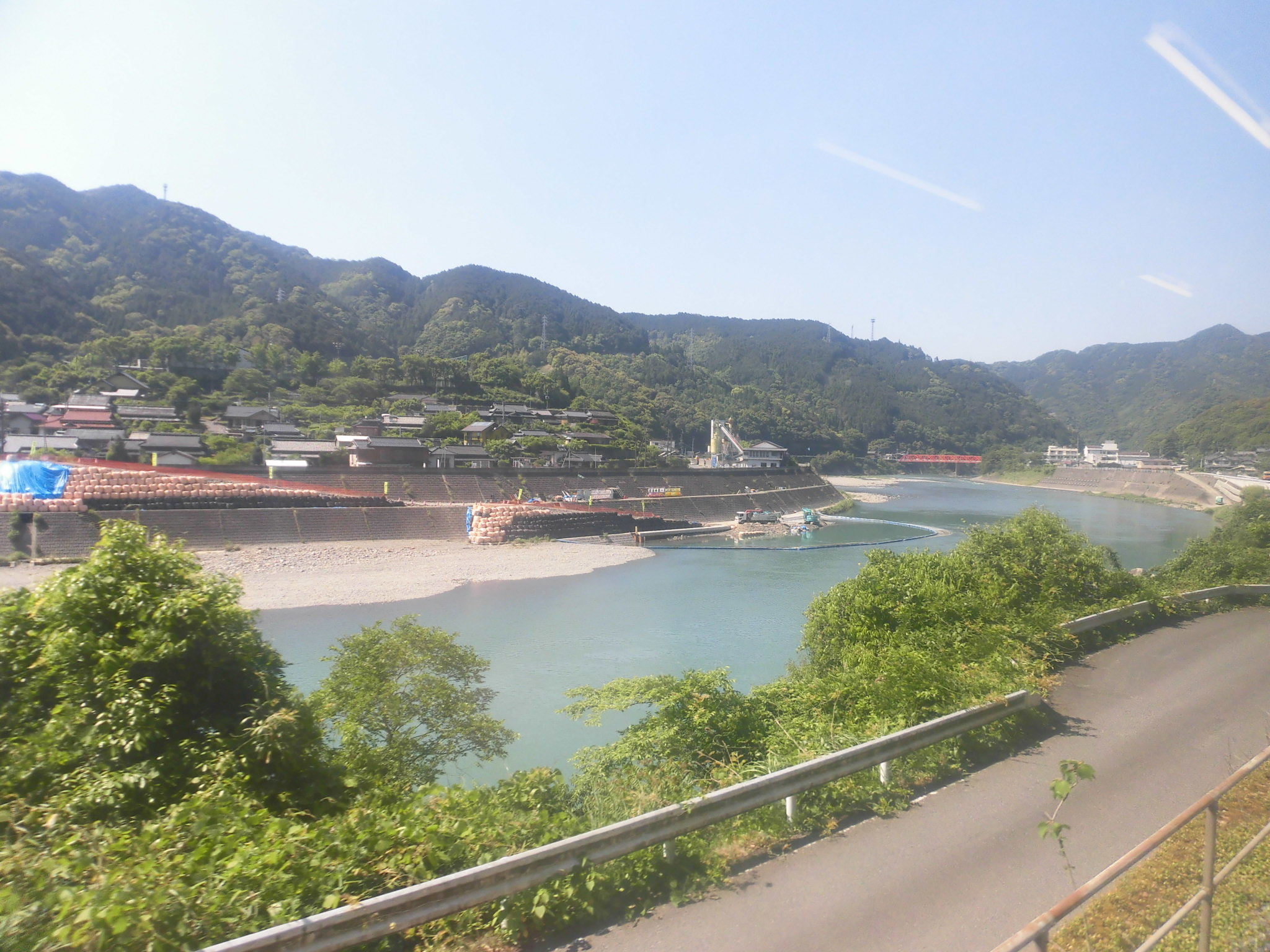
Kuma River

The Kuma River has always been famous for the catching of Ayu, also known as sweetfish. The average length of Ayu in the Kuma River is 22.7 cm (8.9 in), with the weight at an average of 122 g (4.3 oz). However, the Ayu inhabiting around the dams have an average of 22 cm (8.7 in) in length, and weighed 103 g (3.6 oz) while Ayu inhabiting in the other sections of the river had an average length of 22 cm (8.7 in) and weighed 103 g (3.6 oz). it is said that the number of Ayu in the area has decreased drastically due to human influences such as the constructions of the dams. Generally, from early March to May, Ayu swim into the Kuma River from the Yatsushiro Sea. The Kuma River and its tributary Kawabe River is known for its “shaku-ayu”, a very large Ayu having a length of 30 cm (12 in) which attracts many of its tourists. Fishing of Ayu is generally done from early summer to fall, economically assisting the locals in the surrounding of Kuma River especially for those running inns and restaurants.

Freshwater eels, donko (Odontobutis obscura), as well as gane crabs (Eriocheir japonica) were also popular for fishing prior to the construction of dams on the Kuma River. The local fishermen have also mentioned that the weather loach (Misgrunus anguillicaudatus), the Chinese soft-shell turtle (Pelodiscus sinensis) and the Japanese rice fish (Oryzias latipes) were often seen in the Kuma River before the construction of dams. The changes of water flow, water levels and the pollution of water caused the freshwater eels to leave the Kuma River areas.

== Dams ==
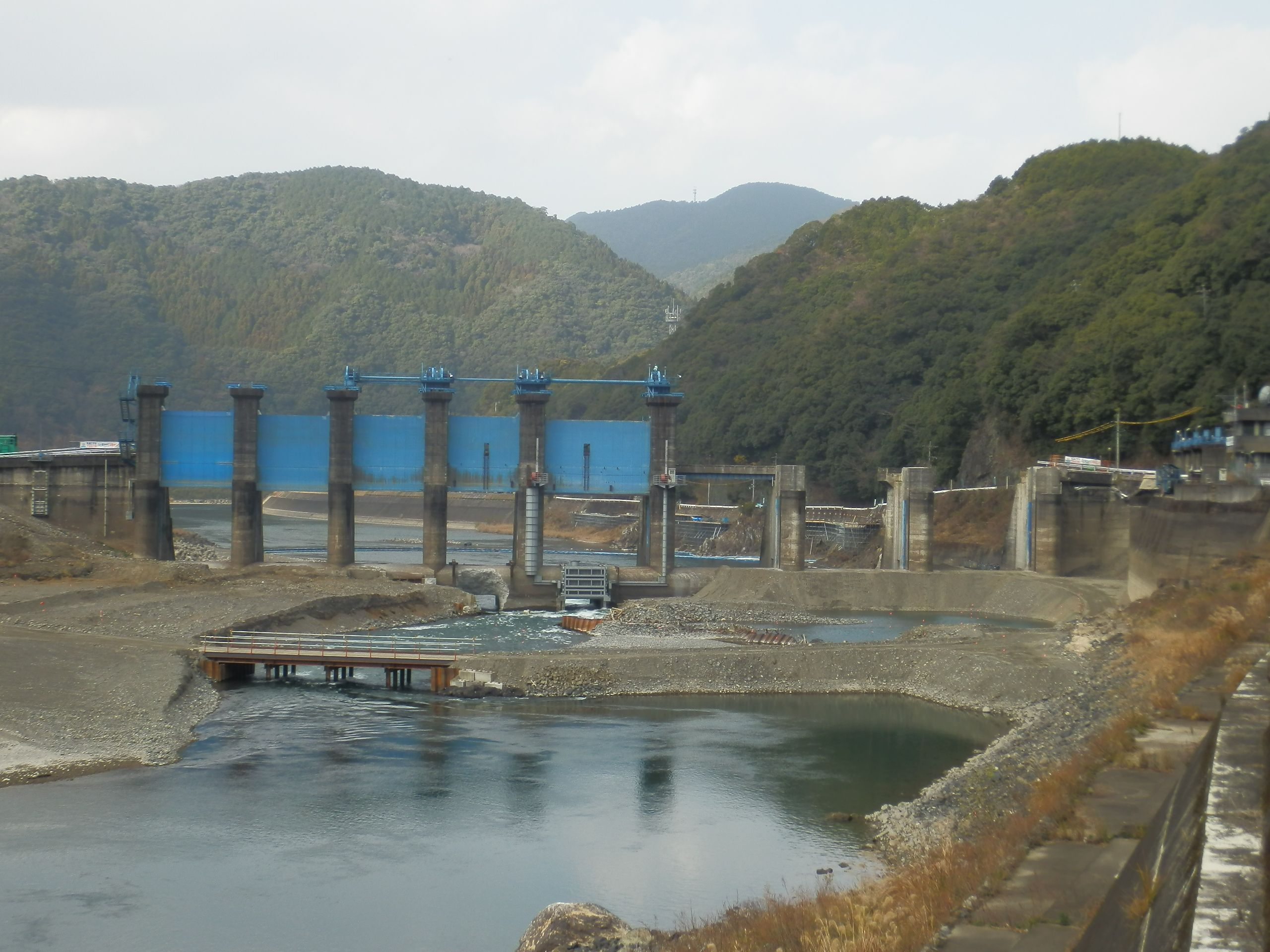
Arase dam, located on the mainstream of Kuma River

In the past, there have been constructions of three dams on the mainstream of Kuma River, which are, in the order from the estuary, the Arase dam, the Setoishi dam and the Ichifusa dam. The completion of the Arase dam was in 1955, the Setoishi dam in the 1958, and the Ichifusa dam in the 1959. The Arase dam was constructed as the first step of the Kuma River General Development Project in 1951. The Arase dam was built on the Kuma River for the purpose of hydropower generation and control of water levels and flooding. Setoishi dam was constructed by an electric power company, at the upper stream of the Kuma River. Ichifusa dam was built by the Kumamoto Prefecture government, also at the upper stream of the Kuma River for water supplies of its neighbourhood.

Due to severe impacts on the environment of the river, such as the disappearance of particular species, there have been debates over dam constructions from the 20th century. In 1999, fish ladders were built at the Arase dam and Setoishi dam but it did not lead to solving issues of decrease in the number of species along the Kuma River.

After the construction of the Arase dam on the Kuma River, local residents were not only stressed due to the reduction of Ayu fish, but also the noises, water quality deterioration, as well as the uncomfortable smell it was producing at times. The ground vibration caused by the discharging of water led to the damages of houses along the dam site on the Kuma River. Difficulty to catch the Ayu fish also led to relocation of local residents around the Kuma river. The number of residents of Sakamoto Village (located near the Arase dam), was once nearly 20,000, however, decreased to less than 5000. There were also issues of cost maintenance of the Arase dam and the decline in the need of hydropower. As a result, the removal of the Arase dam was decided in 2019, and its removal process began in early 2012, gaining much of its attention as the first ever dam removal in Japan. The removal of the Arase dam was completed in September 2017. Along with the decision to remove the Arase dam, a new dam construction on one of the tributaries of the Kuma river (Kawabe river) was also cancelled.

== Tourism ==
The Kuma River and its surrounding areas are also enjoyed as a popular tourist site. Number of people visit the Hitoyoshi city to enjoy recreations at the Kuma River (urban tourism). There are number of transportation available to access the Kuma River. The ecosystem services of the Kuma River largely contribute to the tourism industry of its neighbourhood which includes hot springs and riverboat recreation.

The Kuma River and its tributary Kawabe river is known for its “shaku-ayu”, a very large ayu having a length of 30 cm which attracts many of its tourists. Fishing of ayu is generally done from early summer to fall, economically assisting the locals in the surrounding of Kuma river especially for those running inns and restaurants.

== Flood ==
Kuma River flooding: 3 July 2020

In July 2020, there was massive overflowing of the Kuma river bank due to heavy rain, causing flooding in large areas of Kumamoto prefecture. At least 50 people were found dead and 11 people missing due to this flood. Among the 50 deaths, 14 deaths were the residents of a nursing home located in the Kuma village, near the Kuma river. One of the areas nearby was flooded up to a depth of 4.3 m (14 ft).

Shinzo Abe, Japanese prime minister at the time, responded to the flooding of the Kuma river by visiting the areas affected and assessing the aid needed. Financial aid for the areas with crucial damage, as well as restoration of highways and other damages caused by the Kuma river flooding was outlined. Prime Minister Abe assigned the aid of 400 billion yen as a support for repairing any damages as well as businesses affected by the flood.

The Kuma River have also badly flooded in 1965, caused by heavy rainfall. It is also said that this flooding was worsened by the dams built along the Kuma River mainstream. Local residents have commented that flooding have become worse after the construction of dams, where flooded water became more muddy or polluted.

== See also ==
- Japanese cruiser Kuma
- 2020 Kyushu floods
