= Parachute (disambiguation) =

A parachute is a fabric device to slow descent through the air.

Parachute or Parachutes may also refer to:

== Arts, entertainment and media ==
=== Films and television ===
- Parachute (film), a 2023 American drama
- Parachute (TV series), a 2024 Indian Tamil-language drama thriller
- "Parachute", a 2019 episode of Not Going Out episodes

=== Music ===
==== Groups and festivals ====
- Parachute (band), an American pop rock band
- Parachute Band, a New Zealand Christian worship band, formed out of Parachute Music
- Parachute music festival, a contemporary Christian music festival in New Zealand

==== Albums ====
- Parachute (Guster album), 1994
- Parachute (The Pretty Things album), 1970
- Parachute (Upchurch album), 2019
- Parachutes (Coldplay album), 2000
- Parachutes (Frank Iero and the Patience album), 2016

==== Songs ====
- "Parachute" (Cheryl Cole song), 2009
- "Parachute" (Timomatic song), 2013
- "Parachute" (Otto Knows song), 2014
- "Parachute" (Chris Stapleton song), 2016
- "Parachute" (Kaiser Chiefs song), 2016
- "Parachute" (Hayley Williams song), 2025
- "Parachute", by Something Happens from Stuck Together with God's Glue, 1990
- "Parachute", by Sean Lennon from Friendly Fire, 2006
- "Parachute", by Jolin Tsai from Butterfly, 2009
- "Parachute", by Timothy B. Schmit from Expando, 2009
- "Parachute", by Train from Save Me, San Francisco, 2009
- "Parachute", by Laura Marano from the soundtrack Austin & Ally: Turn It Up, 2012
- "Parachute", by Kris Allen from Horizons, 2014
- "Parachute", by Caroline Polachek from Pang, 2019
- "Parachute", by Scott Weiland and the Wildabouts from Blaster, 2015
- "Parachutes" (song), by Charlie Simpson, 2011
- "Parachutes", by Pearl Jam from Pearl Jam, 2006

=== Other uses in arts, entertainment and media ===
- Parachute (magazine), Canadian arts magazine
- Parachute (video game), an Atari 2600 game released by Homevision

== Other uses ==
- Parachute (BDSM), a sex toy
- Parachute (brand), a brand name for coconut-based oil products manufactured by Marico
- Parachute (drugs), a method of ingesting drugs
- Parachute (restaurant), in Chicago, US, now closed
- Parachute, Colorado, a place in the United States
- Playground parachute, a colourful round sheet used for children's games

== See also ==
- Parachuting, a sport
- Parachute candidate, an election candidate who does not live in the election area
- Parachute flare, a pyrotechnic
- Parachute journalism, sending inexperienced journalists into an area
- Parachute pants, a style of trousers
- Playground parachute, for play
- Parachute vent, part of a hot air balloon
