= Hyōroku mochi =

Japanese confection

Hyōrokumochi
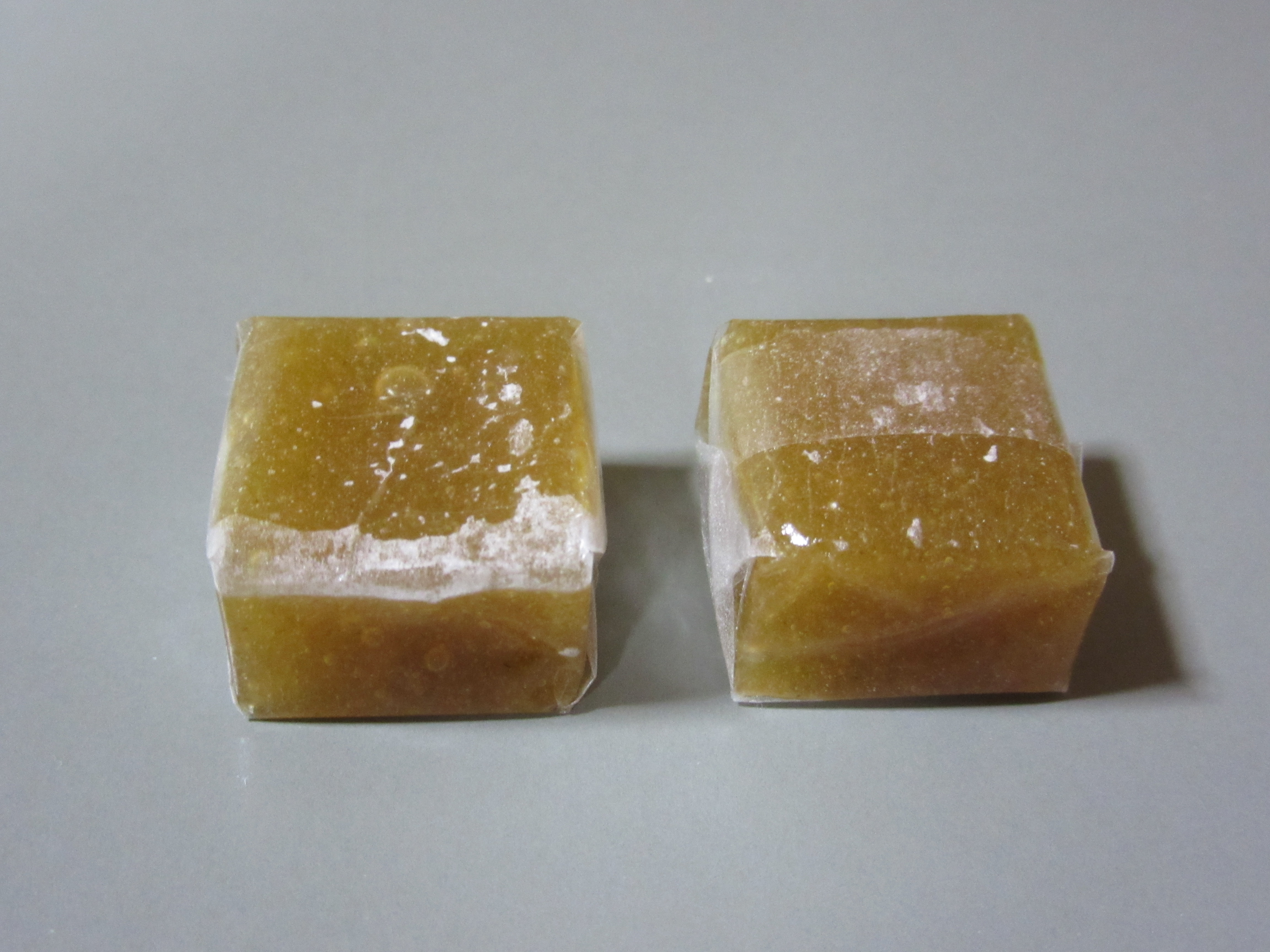
- Type: Confectionery
- Place of origin: Japan
- Region or state: Kyushu
- Created by: Seika Foods
- Main ingredients: Gyūhi (starch syrup, nori, powdered green tea, soybean flour, and whitebean paste)

Hyōrokumochi (兵六餅) is a candy which is made and sold by Seika Foods in Kagoshima. Similar to a rice cake, it is made of maltose starch syrup, nori, powdered green tea, soybean flour, and white bean paste. It is shaped into a small cube and wrapped in a thin film of edible starch. Hyōrokumochi can be bought at stores throughout Kyushu.

== History ==
In 1931, Kagoshima Seika, the predecessor of Seika Foods, started to sell these candy. Hyōrokumochi was named after Ōishi Hyōroku Yumemonogatari, a Kagoshima book written by Japanese writer Mōri Masanao.

On the box, there is the picture of a young soldier from Kagoshima wearing a fundoshi, the traditional Japanese undergarment for adult males, made from a length of cotton. At first the company was unable to obtain permission for the packet because the man's bottom is bare. However Seika Foods insisted that the fundoshi hides everything that needs to be hidden, and so permission was granted.

It is currently imported to North America from Japan by JFC International.

== See also ==
- Botan Rice Candy
