= Dagashi =

Cheap Japanese candies

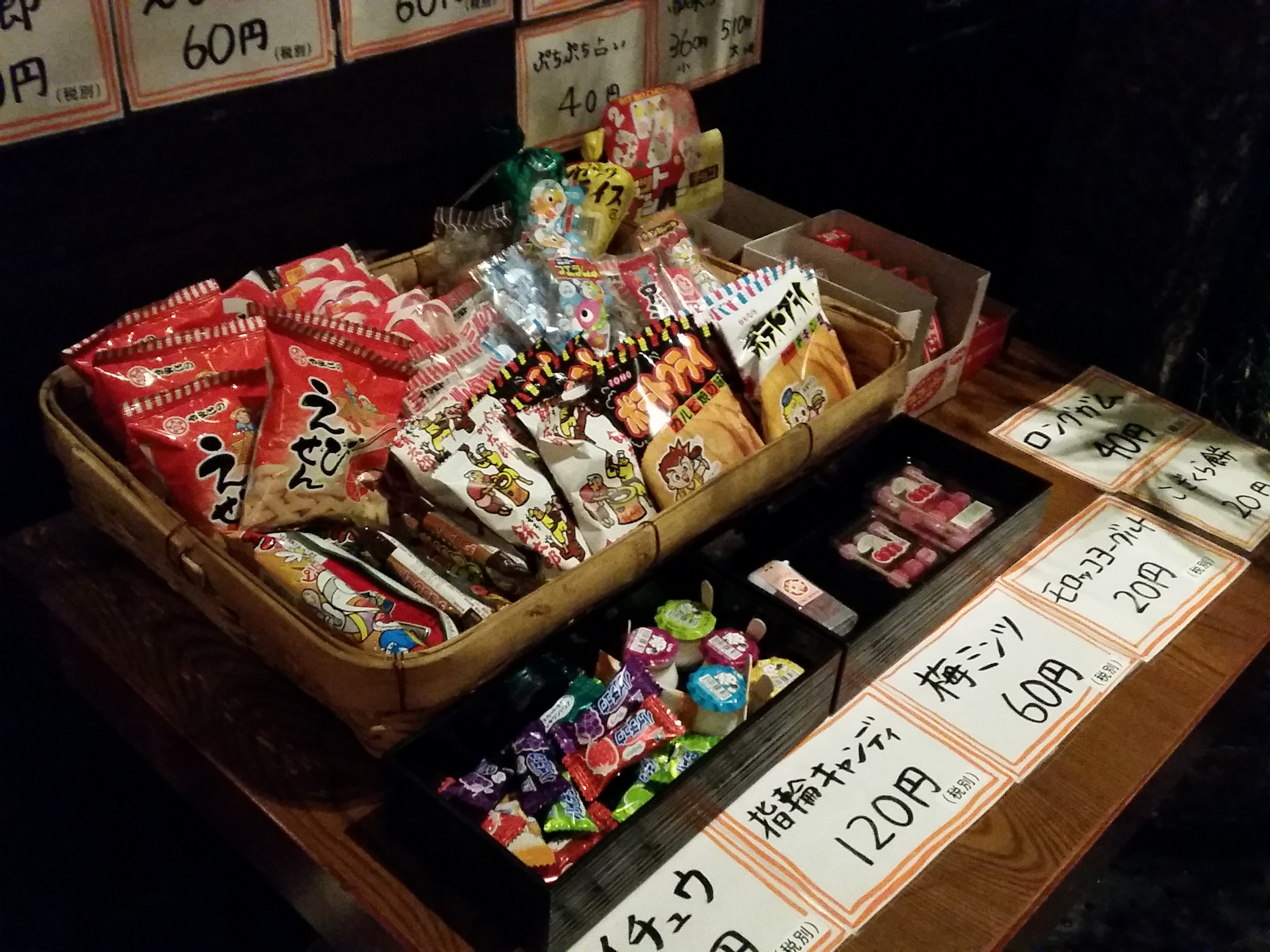
An assortment of dagashi

Dagashi (Japanese: 駄菓子), in Japan, refers to cheap candies and snack foods. Dagashi are comparable to American penny candy.

The word dagashi is derived from the Japanese words da ("futile" or "negligible") and kashi (snacks). The low price and fun packaging is designed to attract children with small allowances, and dagashi came to be known as the small candies that children can afford with pocket money.

Most dagashi are packaged in bright, colorful wrapping and sometimes come with a small toy or prize. The toys are often small figurines, and a common prize is a randomized prize that will allow the holder to claim a second free snack.

Dagashi used to be sold in stores specializing primarily in dagashi called dagashiya (Japanese: 駄菓子屋), but are now increasingly sold in convenience stores as well.

== History ==
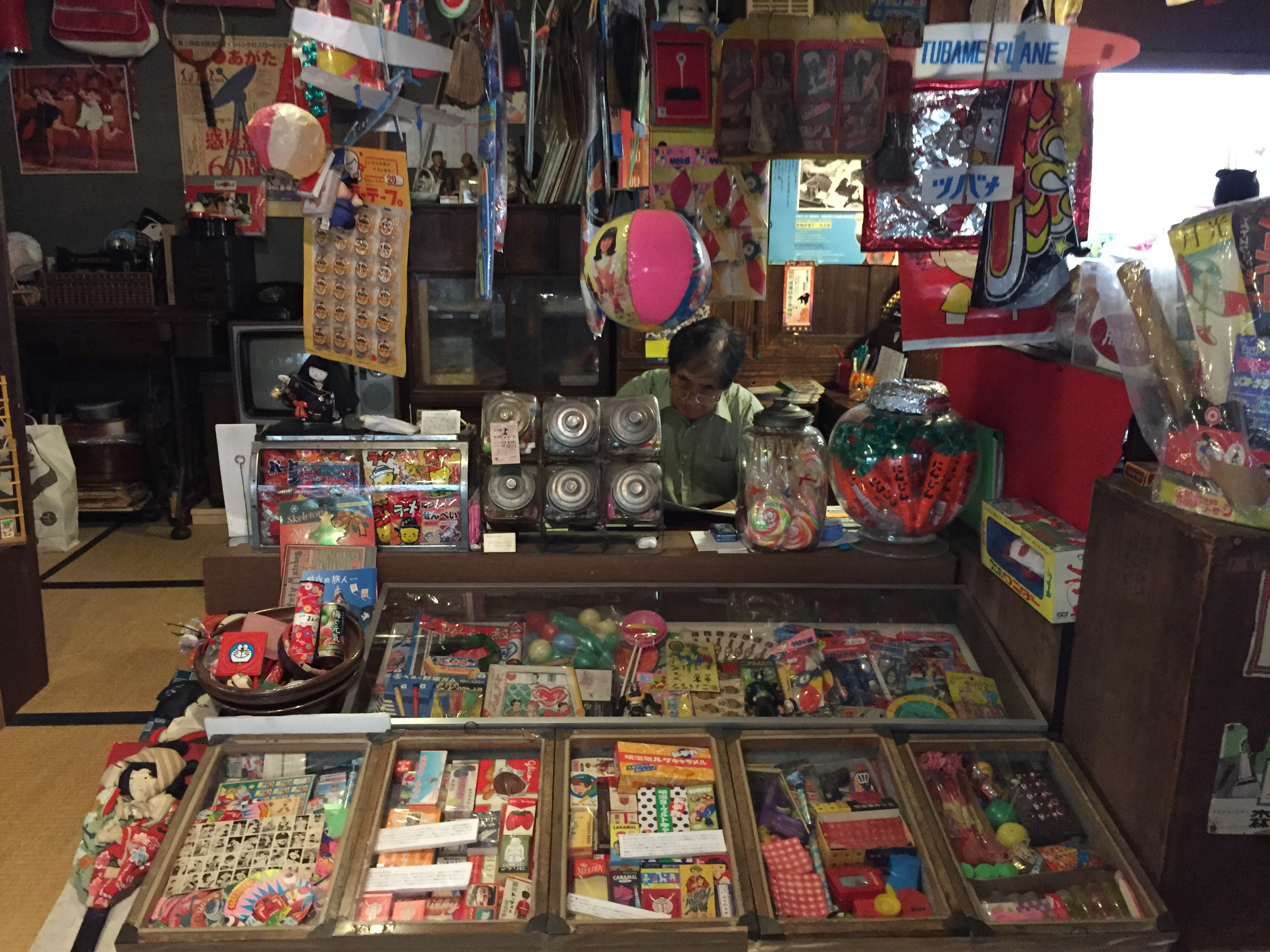
Recreation of a dagashiya at Ōme Akasuka Fujio Kaikan Museum (Retro Museum of Packaging from the Showa Era, 1926–1989)

While modern dagashi developed after World War II, dagashi has been around since the Edo period (1603–1868). Dagashi, made from starch or corn, was the commoner equivalent of the more expensive jōgashi, which was higher quality and made from white sugar.

Modern dagashi experienced its greatest popularity in the post-war Shōwa period (from the 1950s to the early 1980s) when dagashiya (stores that specialized in dagashi) were common and a staple after-school hangout spot for younger students.

During the Bubble Economy period (1986–1991), the amount of spending money schoolchildren had access to rapidly increased. Many dagashiya began to diversify their products or were replaced by convenience stores.

As of 2018, dagashi can still be found in the occasional dagashiya, in convenience stores, or ordered online. Culture expos in Japan (especially for schools) sometimes include dagashi and dagashiya displays. Dagashi have also become more widely available outside Japan.

== Types ==
The key considerations for companies producing dagashi are:

- Low price - each piece should retail between 10 and 200 yen, a reasonable amount for a school child
- Shelf stability - the lack of refrigeration or air conditioning in traditional dagashiya in the summer should not cause spoilage or affect taste
- Attractiveness to children
  - Wrappers and mascots - distinctive to help pre-literate children in making selections and promote brand recognition
  - Interactiveness - dagashi that can be played with extends the amount of time the child has with a small portion of candy, including candy cigarettes, Fue Ramune (a hard candy that can be played as a whistle), neri-ame, etc.
  - Prizes, including a chance to win another dagashi, figurines, or menko

Dagashi include hard candy, gum, chocolates, cakes, and certain types of pastries, like donuts. Dagashi also includes snacks such as juice powders and flavorings, potato and corn snacks, small cups of ramen, rice crackers, flavored squid, and preserved fruit.

== Dagashiya ==
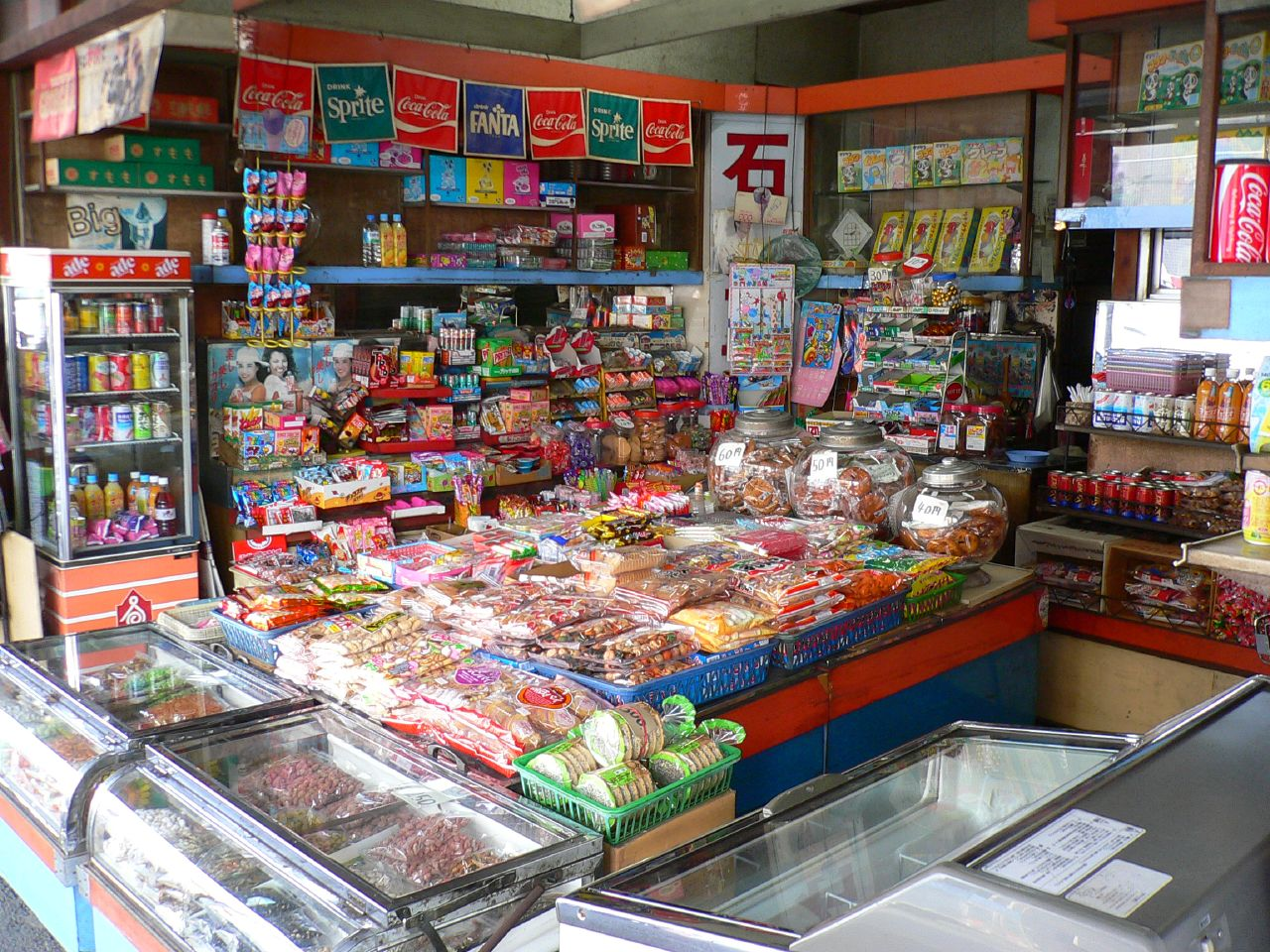
A dagashiya in Yokohama

Dagashiya are the traditional stores that sell dagashi. Besides dagashi, dagashiya often sell small toys and may have coin-operated arcade-style games or gashapon.

During the post-war Showa period, children often stopped by a dagashiya after school to purchase the cheap snacks and socialize with each other and the shop owners.

Though in decline due to convenience stores, dagashiya can still be found in Japan, with around 50 in the Tokyo area. Today, dagashiya are regarded as nostalgic and are frequently found in resort or vacation towns.

== Cultural references ==
The oldest continuously operating dagashiya in Tokyo is Kami-kawaguchiya, which was established in 1781. It is located on the grounds of Kishibojin Shrine and served as the model for the dagashiya in the Studio Ghibli film Only Yesterday.

With the proliferation of convenience stores and the falling Japanese birthrate, traditional dagashiyas have been declining rapidly. However, dagashi and dagashiyas have attained more attention in Japanese pop culture with the release of the anime Dagashi Kashi. The anime covers some of the most popular dagashi, as well as more obscure kinds.

Some savory dagashi are also suitable as sakana (drinking snacks) and adults consume them out of nostalgia. Examples such as Umaibo and cheese arare are featured in the ninth episode of the drinking anime Takunomi.

== Common dagashi ==
- Anzu-bō (stick candy made of dried apricots)
- Baby Star Ramen, Yatta Men, or Ramen Baba (flavored fried noodle snacks)
- Big Katsu (fish surimi shaped to look like tonkatsu)
- Botan Rice Candy
- Butamen (mini instant cup ramen)
- Cabbage Taro (corn snack flavored like okonomiyaki)
- Choco Bat (chocolate flavoured biscuit shaped like a baseball bat)
- Candy cigarettes
- Dice Caramel (caramels in cube paper packaging printed to look like dice)
- Fugashi (long strips of dough baked to a spongey and flakey texture and coated in brown sugar)
- Ikasomen (thin noodle-like strips of dried squid)
- Kinako-bō (kinako flavored candy eaten with a toothpick)
- Konpeitō (traditional sugar candy)
- Morocco Yogur (powdered candy in a plastic yoghurt jar eaten with a stick)
- Namaiki Beer (tablet that when added to water creates a carbonated juice drink that looks like beer)
- Neri-ame (flavored malt glucose syrup which you knead with chopsticks until it becomes taffy-like)
- Ninjin (puffed rice in a tapered bag that looks like a carrot)
- Sakuma drops
- Ramune
- Ramune candy (hard candy flavored like soda or lemonade often packaged in a plastic ramune bottle), including Fue Ramune (ramune with a hole you can play like a whistle) and Bottle Ramune (powdered candy in an edible wafer bottle packaged with a straw)
- Sakura Daikon (slice of fermented daikon with ume which gives its pink color)
- Sukonbu (vinegar flavored dried kelp)
- Tirol Choco (a type of chocolate dagashi that comes in cube paper packaging sometimes printed to look like Japanese pop culture or anime icons)
- Umaibō or Umai-bou (Cheetos-like snacks that come in over 36 flavors)
- Ume Jam (a pickled plum soaked and packaged in sour, red sauce, often eaten spread on a milk cracker)
- Yan Yan
- Yocchan Ika (dried squid flavored with soy sauce or vinegar, either whole on a stick or cut into pieces)
- Young Donuts (miniature sugar donuts)

== Examples ==
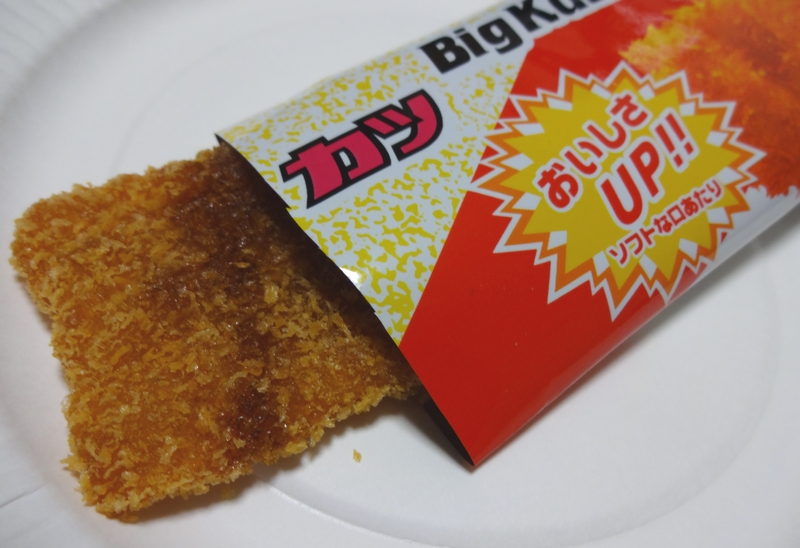
Big Katsu

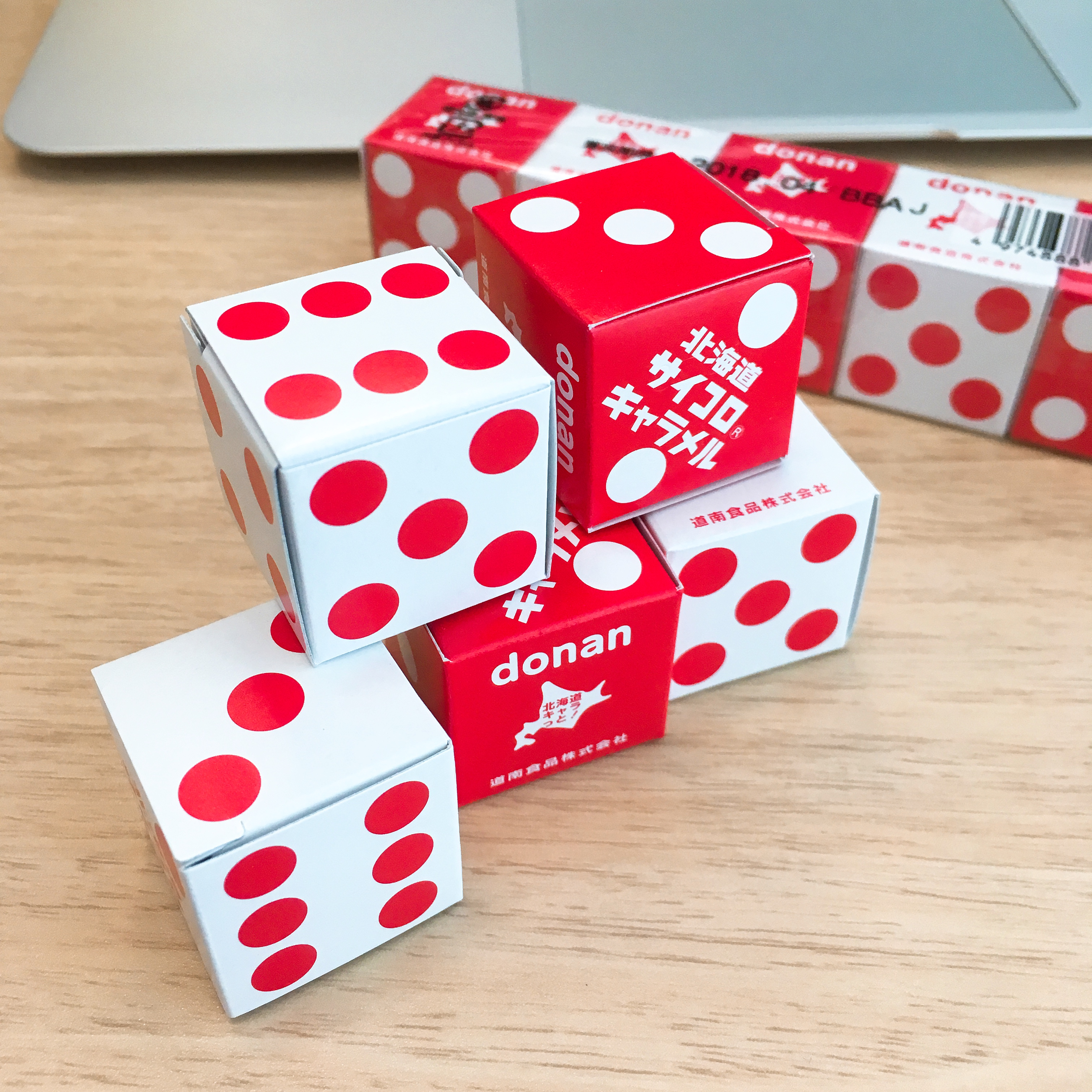
Dice caramel

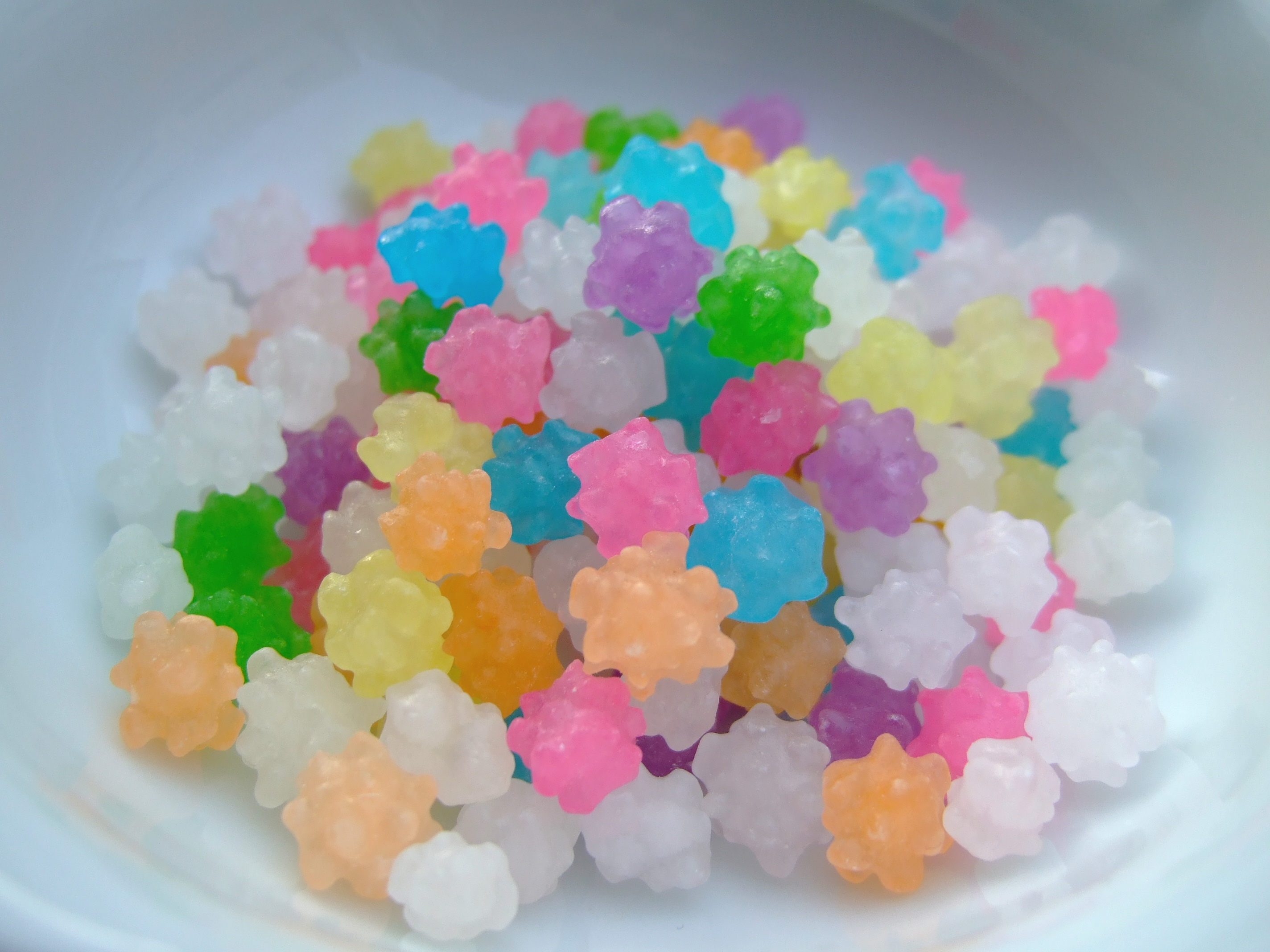
Konpeitō

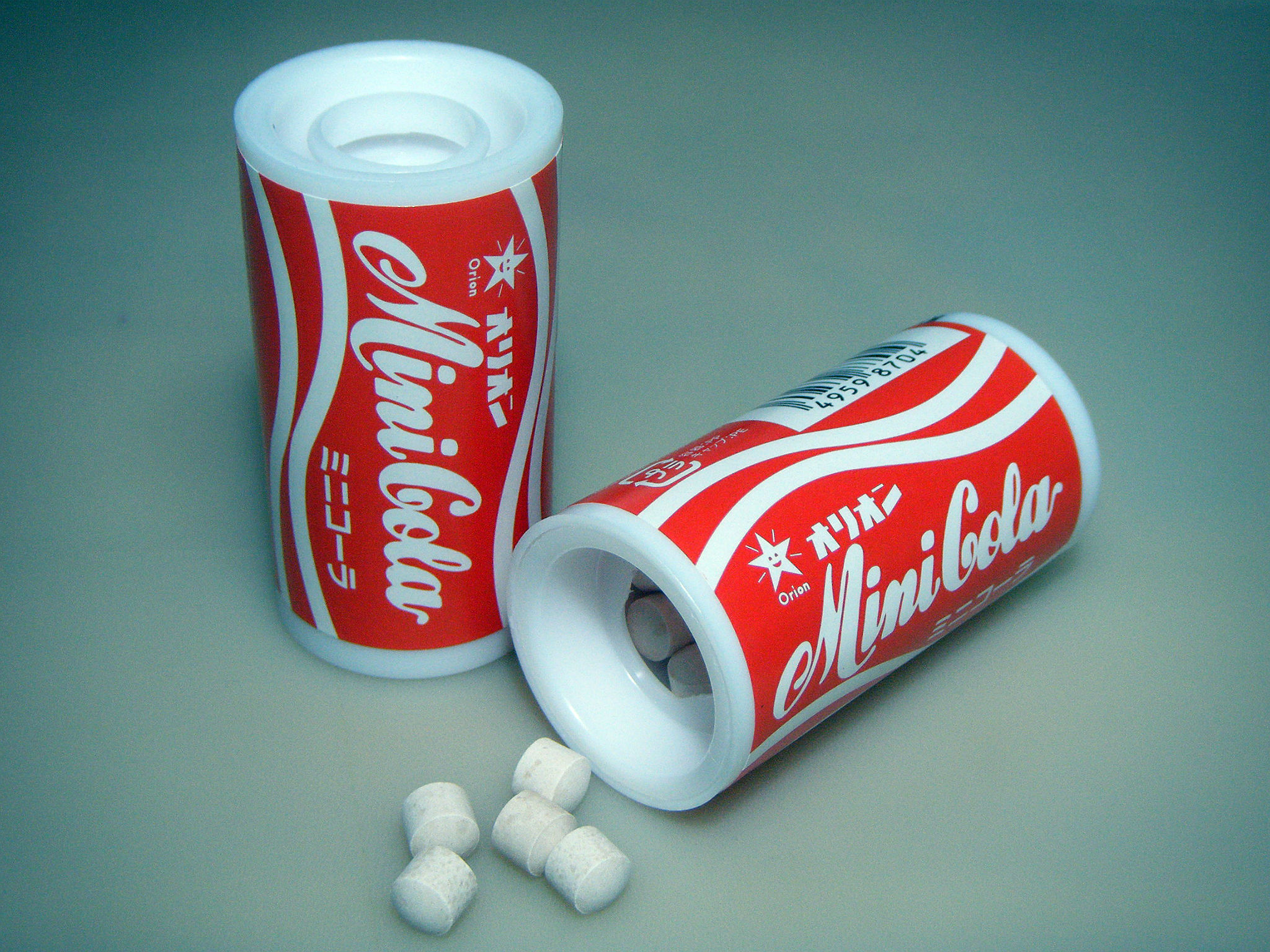
Orion Mini Cola

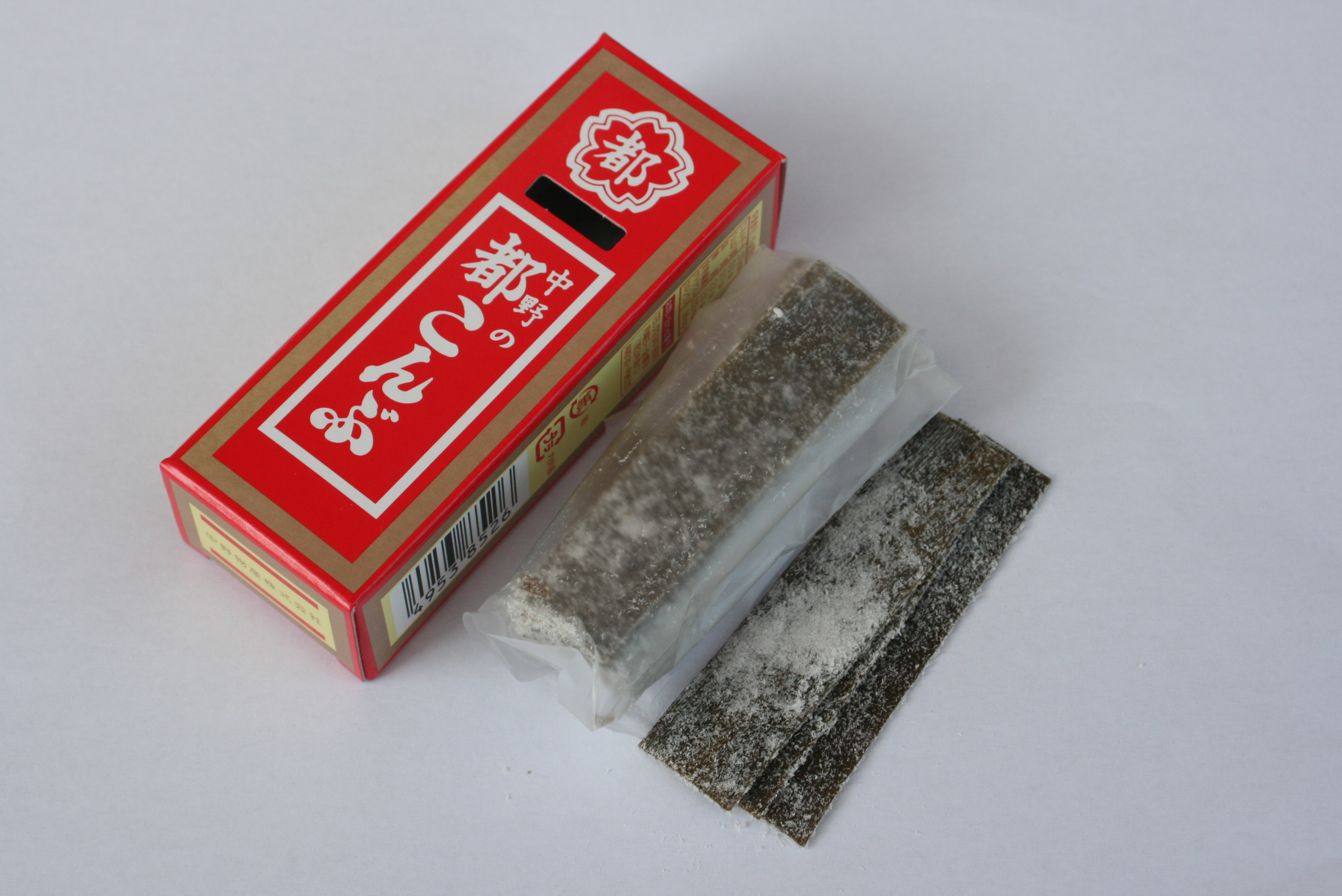
Miyako Kombu, a kind of sukonbu

== See also ==
- List of Japanese snacks
- Wagashi
- Bulk confectionery
