= Oblaat =

Edible layer of starch used to wrap some candies and pharmaceuticals in Japan

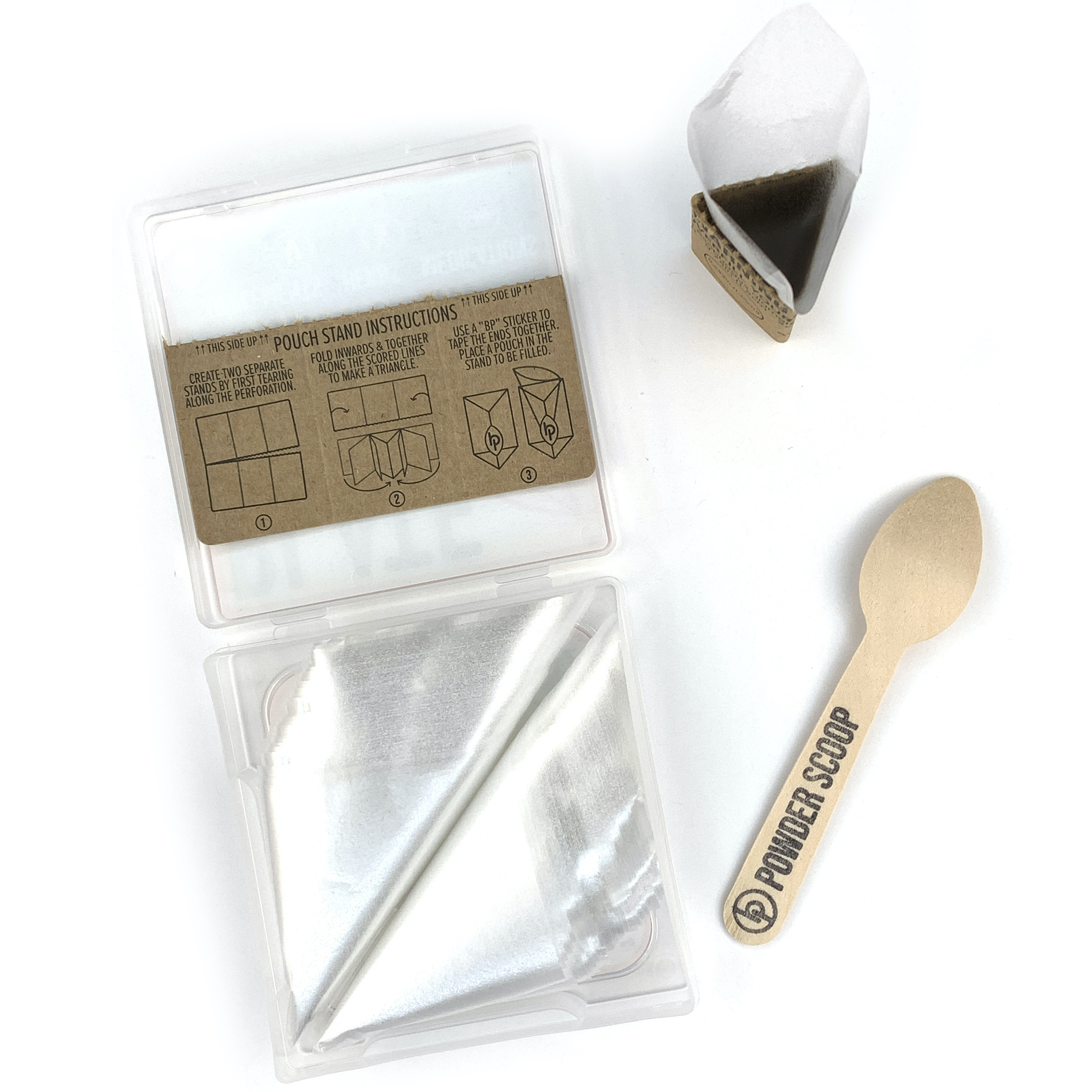
- Blate Papes edible pouches
- Alternative names: Oblate, oblate disc, papes, edible film
- Place of origin: Netherlands, Japan
- Main ingredients: Starch

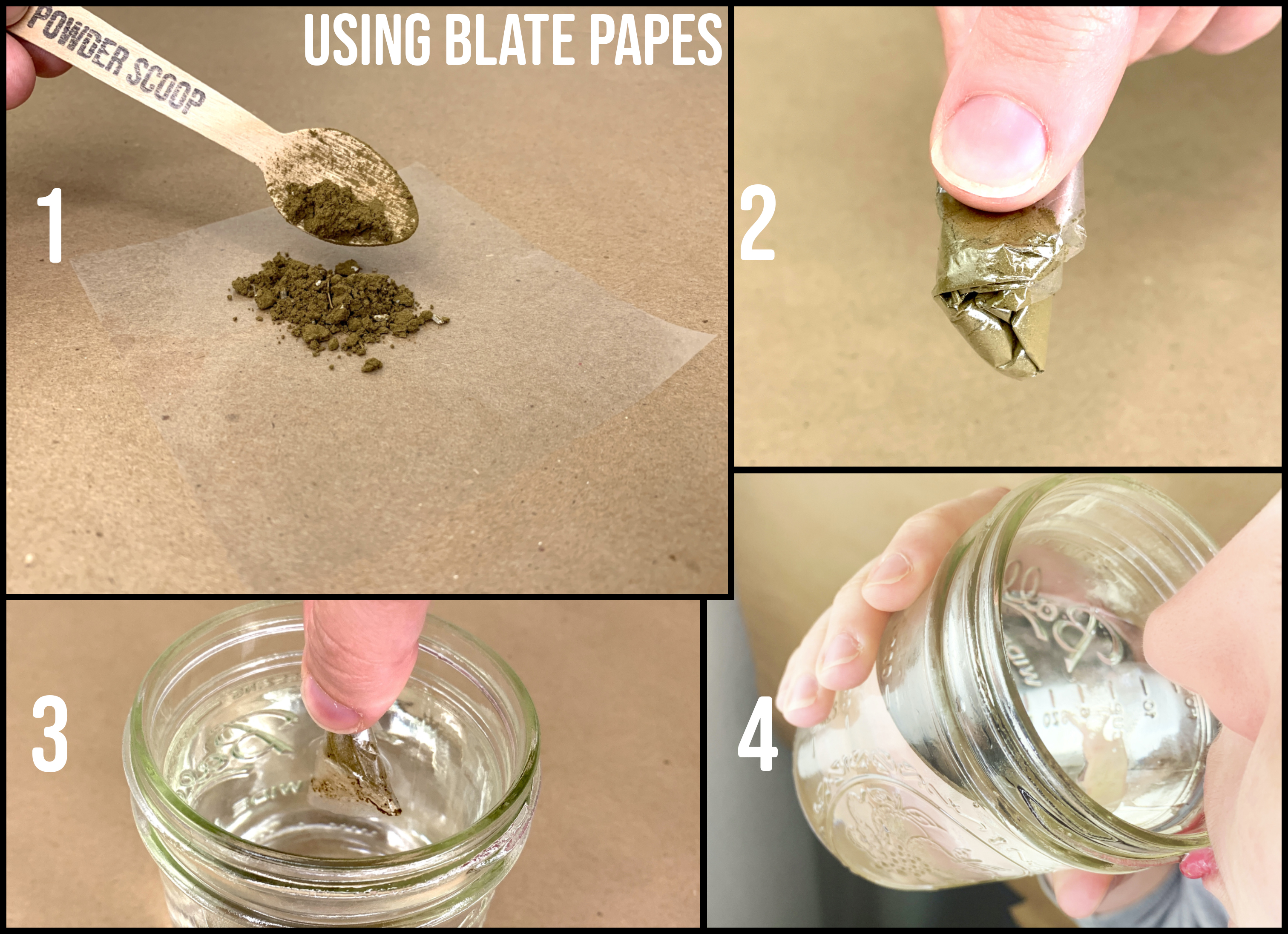
Using Blate Papes to consume powdered herbs

In Japan, oblaat (オブラート, oburāto) is a thin, edible layer of starch used to wrap some candies and pharmaceuticals, similar to capsules.

== Description ==
Many types of Japanese candy are wrapped in oblate film, which is an edible, thin cellophane made of rice starch. Not only is it is almost entirely lacking in taste and odor, it is transparent. It is useful to preserve gelatinous sweets by absorbing humidity. In America, these films are called oblate discs, blate papes, and edible films. They are most commonly used to take powdered herbs, supplements, and medications, allowing the user to consume multiple grams at one time more quickly and pleasantly than with capsules or other methods.

== Etymology ==
The name comes from the Dutch word oblaat, referring to sacramental bread, in turn from Latin oblātum ("offered").

== History ==
Oblaat was introduced to Japan by Dutch pharmaceutical companies in the late 19th century to wrap bad tasting medicine so that it could be swallowed without tasting any bitter powder. Oblaat's moisture-absorbing properties have since given rise to its use for a candy wrapper, to keep the pieces of candy from sticking together.

== See also ==
- Capsule (pharmacy)
- Confectionery
- Dagashi
- Botan Rice Candy
- White Rabbit (candy)
- Bánh đa nem (Northern Vietnamese rice paper)
- List of Japanese foods
- Parachute (drugs)
