= Uniformity of content =

Uniformity of Content is a pharmaceutical analysis parameter for the quality control of capsules or tablets. Multiple capsules or tablets are selected at random and a suitable analytical method is applied to assay the individual content of the active ingredient in each capsule or tablet.

The preparation complies if not more than one (all within limits) individual content is outside the limits of 85 to 115% of the average content and none is outside the limits of 75 to 125% of the average content. The preparation fails to comply with the test if more than 3 individual contents are outside the limits of 85 to 115% of the average content or if one or more individual contents are outside the limits of 75% to 125% of the average content.
