= List of cities in Kumamoto Prefecture by population =

The following list sorts all cities (including towns and villages) in the Japanese prefecture of Kumamoto with a population of more than 10,000 according to the 2020 Census. As of October 1, 2020, 28 places fulfill this criterion and are listed here. This list refers only to the population of individual cities, towns and villages within their defined limits, which does not include other municipalities or suburban areas within urban agglomerations.

== List ==
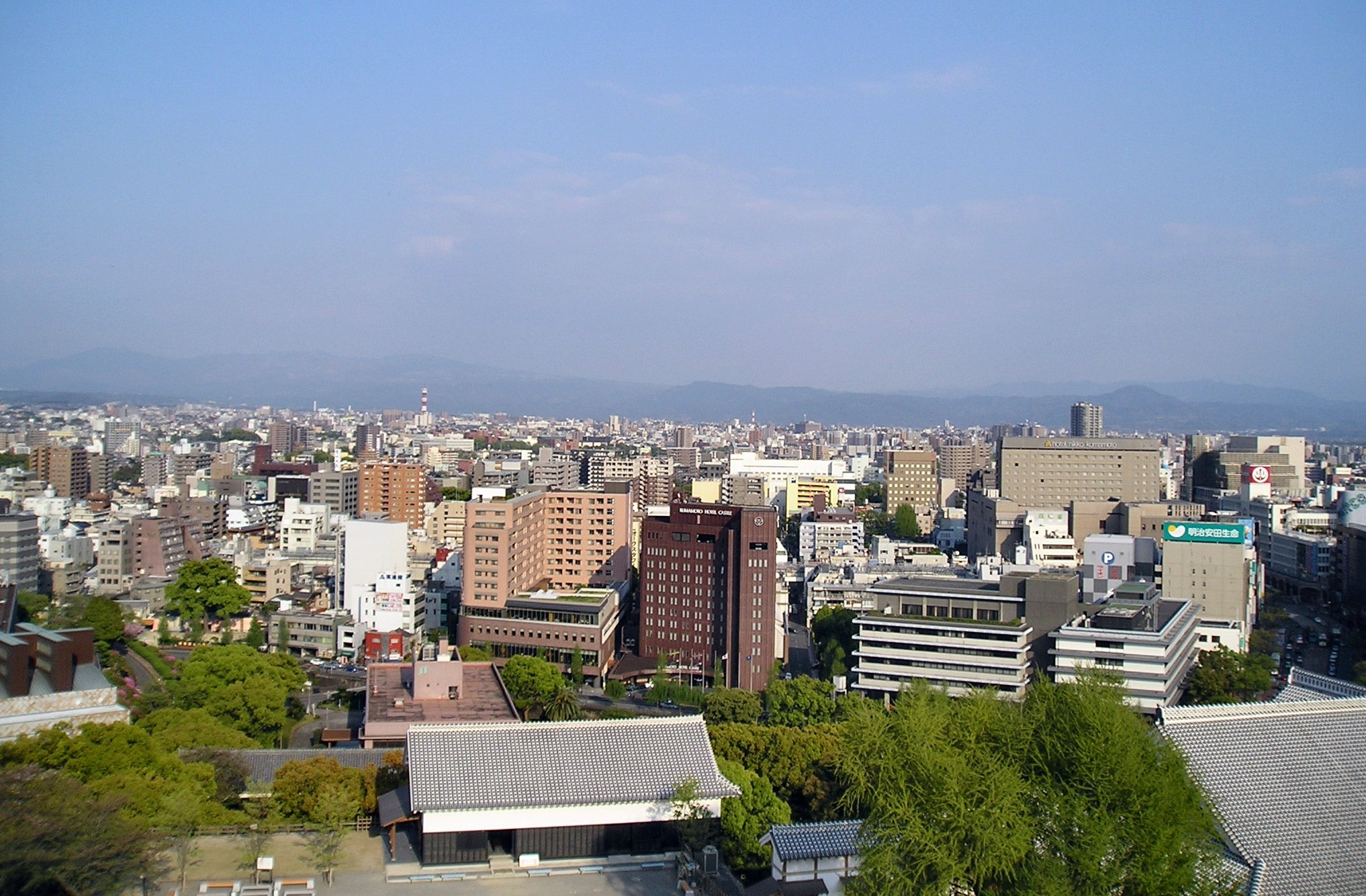
01.Kumamoto

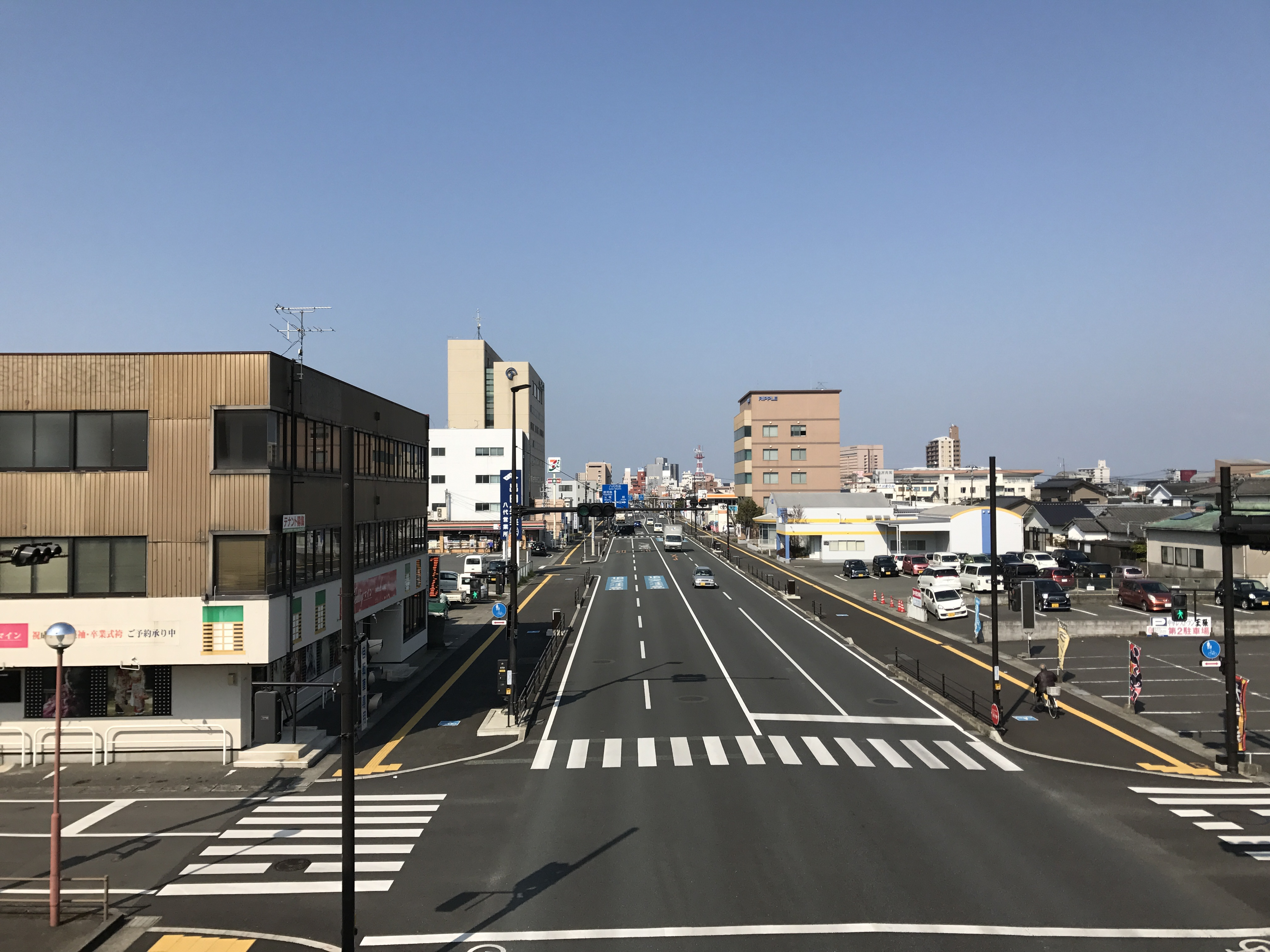
02.Yatsushiro

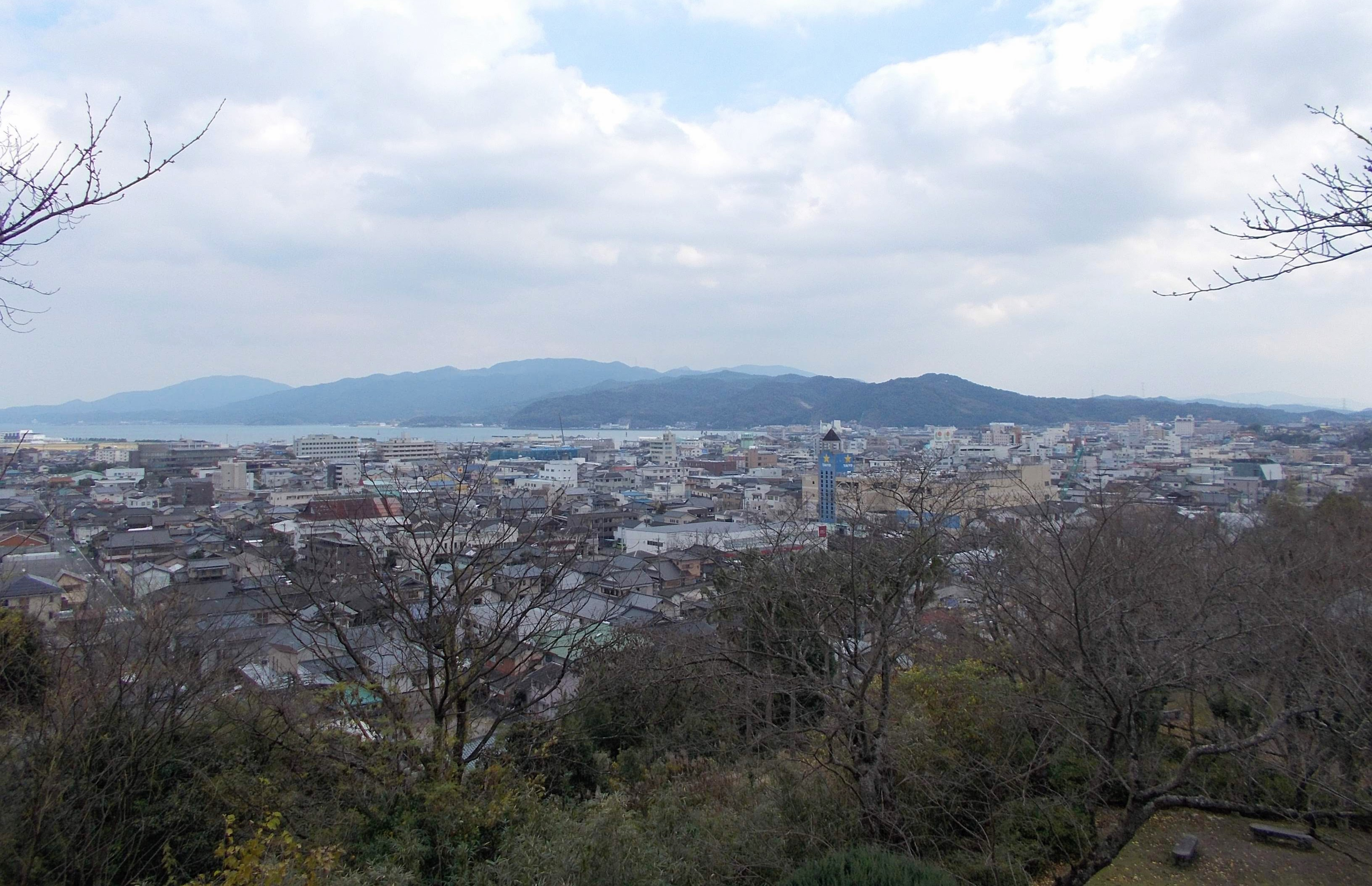
03.Amakusa

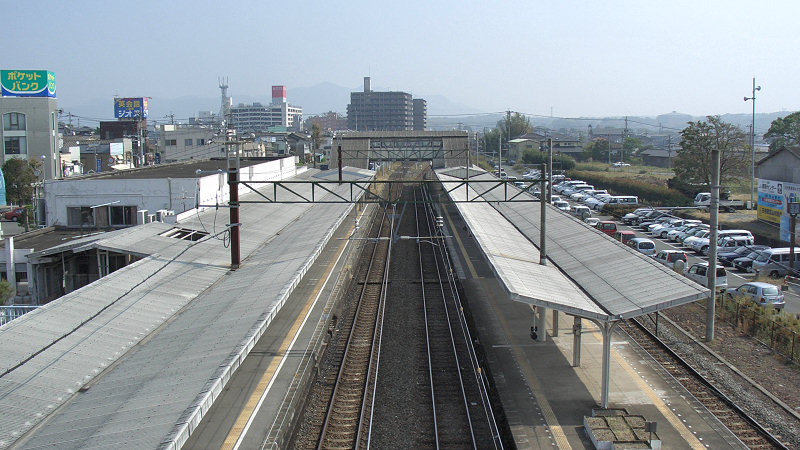
04.Tamana

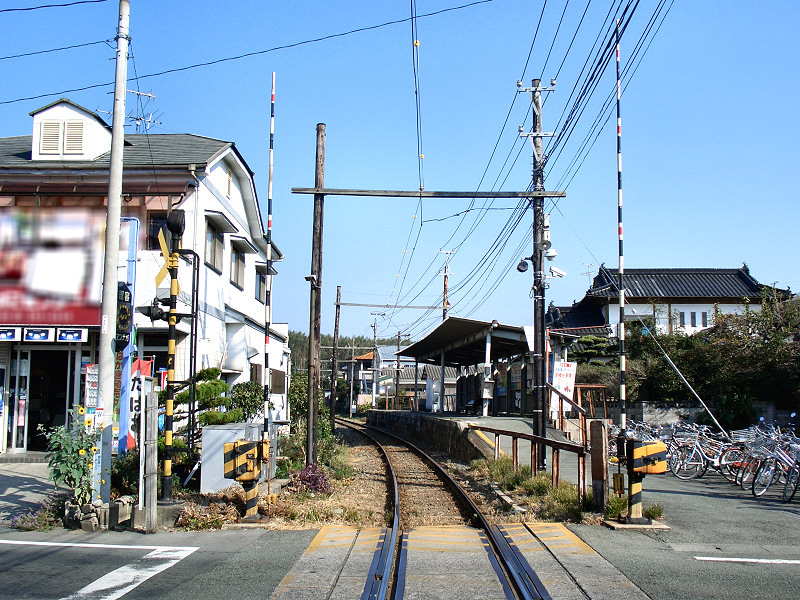
05.Kōshi

The following table lists the 28 cities, villages and towns in Kumamoto with a population of at least 10,000 on October 1, 2020, according to the 2020 Census. The table also gives an overview of the evolution of the population since the 1995 census.

Rank (2020)	Name	Status	2020	2015	2010	2005	2000	1995
1	Kumamoto	City	738,744	740,822	734,474	727,978	720,816	708,097
2	Yatsushiro	City	123,146	127,472	132,266	136,886	140,655	143,712
3	Amakusa	City	75,826	82,739	89,065	96,473	102,907	107,823
4	Tamana	City	64,367	66,782	69,541	71,851	73,051	72,900
5	Kōshi	City	61,829	58,370	55,002	51,647	49,391	46,925
6	Uki	City	57,075	59,756	61,878	63,089	63,968	64,008
7	Arao	City	50,878	53,407	55,321	55,960	56,905	57,389
8	Yamaga	City	49,082	52,264	55,391	57,726	59,491	60,991
9	Kikuchi	City	46,473	48,167	50,194	51,862	52,636	52,545
10	Kikuyō	Town	43,376	40,984	37,734	32,434	28,360	26,273
11	Uto	City	36,192	37,026	37,727	38,023	37,255	35,010
12	Ōzu	Town	35,212	33,452	31,234	29,107	28,021	26,376
13	Mashiki	Town	32,529	33,611	32,676	32,782	32,160	30,757
14	Hitoyoshi	City	31,334	33,880	35,611	37,583	38,814	39,373
15	Aso	City	24,966	27,018	28,444	29,636	30,457	31,364
16	Kamiamakusa	City	24,584	27,006	29,902	32,502	35,314	36,667
17	Minamata	City	23,580	25,411	26,978	29,120	31,147	32,842
18	Mifune	Town	16,314	17,237	17,888	18,116	18,532	18,438
19	Ashikita	Town	15,688	17,661	19,316	20,840	22,373	23,744
20	Nagasu	Town	15,383	15,889	16,594	17,381	17,956	17,833
21	Asagiri	Town	14,685	15,523	16,638	17,300	17,751	18,533
22	Yamato	Town	13,521	15,149	16,981	18,761	20,333	21,746
23	Hikawa	Town	11,101	11,994	12,715	13,232	13,725	14,287
24	Nishiki	Town	10,292	10,766	11,075	11,647	11,975	12,095
25	Kōsa	Town	10,139	10,717	11,181	11,604	12,012	12,372
