= Irasutoya =

Website of free illustrations by Takashi Mifune

- Irasutoya homepage
- Available in: Japanese
- Founded: 2012
- Headquarters: Tokyo, Japan
- Founder: Takashi Mifune
- Products: Clip art
- Website: irasutoya.com
- IPv6 support: None
- Commercial: No
- Registration: None
- Launched: 31 January 2012; 14 years ago
- Current status: Online
- Content license: Custom

Irasutoya (Japanese: いらすとや; derived from Japanese: イラスト, romanized: irasuto, lit. 'illustration' and Japanese: 屋, romanized: -ya, lit. 'shop') is a website operated by illustrator Takashi Mifune that offers gratis clip art illustrations. These works can be used for both commercial and non-commercial applications, but copyright is not waived, there are moral rights-related restrictions on how they should be used, and restrictions on use amount per commercial project. (Note: For commercial use, up to 20 items per creation may be used free of charge. If the number of items exceeds this limit, a fee of approximately ¥1,000 (excluding tax) per item will be charged for each item (including the first 20). There is no limit on the number of items used for personal or non-commercial use, as well as use by businesses small enough to not require tax returns.)

== Overview ==
An Irasutoya illustration of "person using free materials"

The site has a diverse range of free-to-use clip art illustrations and has gained a reputation as a site where illustrations of any topic can be found. The site's mascot is a black rabbit named Pyoko (IPA: [pʲoko̞]).

Before Irasutoya, there were other sites offering free clip art, but varying art styles resulted in inconsistency if illustrations from multiple sources were used. The combination of Mifune's unified art style and large range of illustrations has contributed to Irasutoya's popularity and prevalence. Irasutoya has been criticized for threatening the careers of other illustrators due to its large volume of freely available materials, but others have noted a significant decline in illustration clients making unreasonable requests as a result.

A Twitter trend to recreate the cover art of albums, video games, manga, and light novels using illustrations from Irasutoya occurred in 2016. A mobile game and a recreation of a game opening sequence were also made using Irasutoya clip art.

The site was updated almost daily after the release of Setsubun illustrations on 31 January 2012, but as Mifune became too busy to maintain the pace of updates, he temporarily stopped updating the site on 31 January 2021. Since then, updates have been irregular, with a few illustrations uploaded per month.

== Subject matter ==
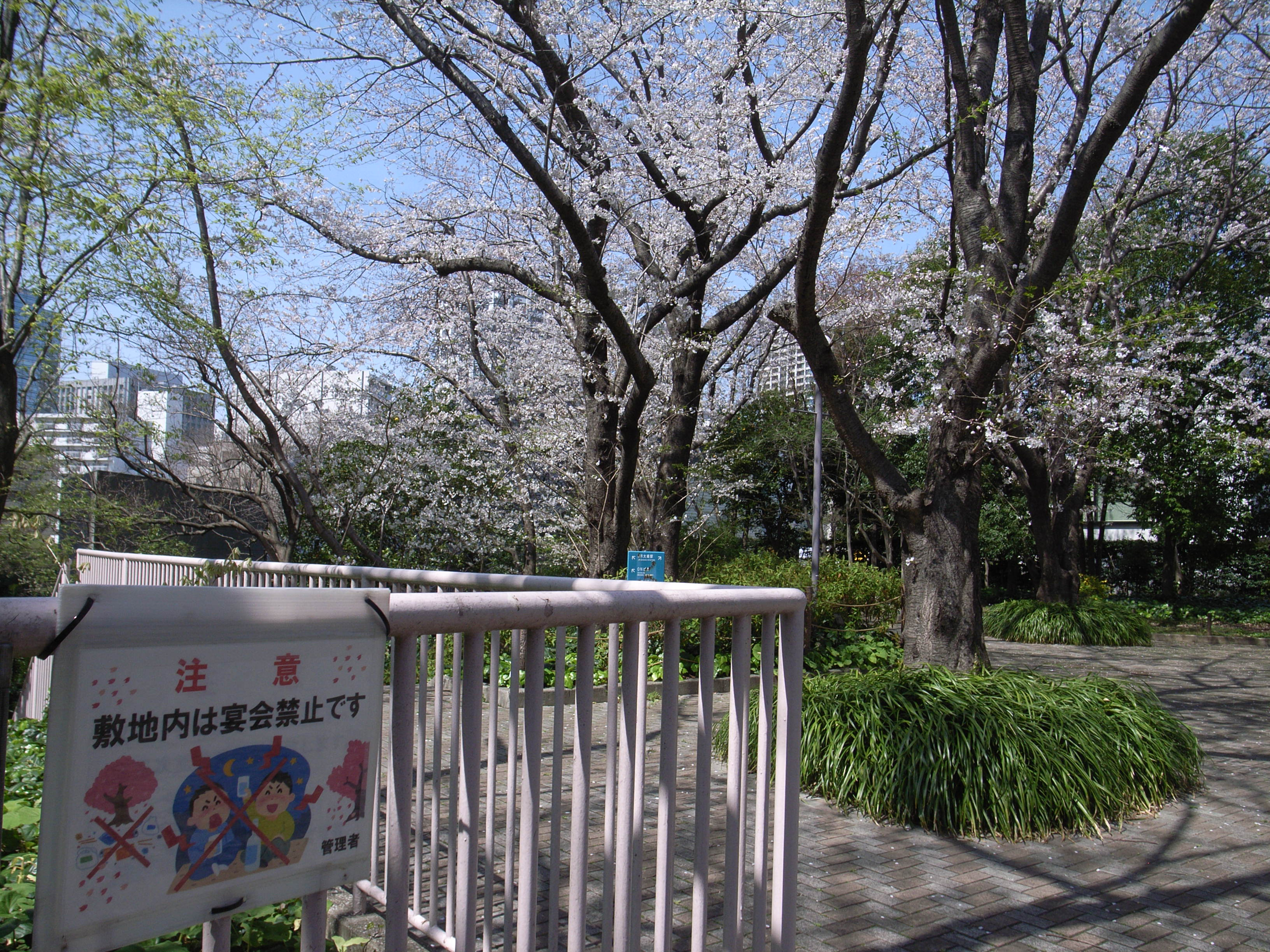
A sign at a park featuring Irasutoya illustrations

In addition to typical clip art topics, unusual occupations such as nosmiologists, airport bird patrollers, and foresters are depicted, as are special machines like miso soup dispensers, centrifuges, transmission electron microscopes, obscure musical instruments (didgeridoo, zampoña, cor anglais), dinosaurs and other ancient creatures such as Hallucigenia and Pikaia, and subjects from fantasy and games (Hero, Mi-Go, Buer), many of which are rare in the free culture world.

There are illustrations of people of various ethnicities and cultures in situations such as attending international school and eating Japanese food. Said ethnicities and cultures include the Selkʼnam people, the La Sape subculture, the Taiwanese indigenous peoples, and Muslim brides and grooms in traditional wedding costumes.

Other topics include Japan Self-Defense Forces personnel, politics, covert photography via hidden cameras and smartphones, gaming mice, education, wisdom teeth, chūnibyō teenagers, depictions of bipedal and quadrupedal chupacabras, and the Antikythera mechanism.

=== Current events ===
Initially, Mifune's illustrations were mainly of a broad, general nature, but gradually, illustrations of current events (sometimes of a satirical nature) began to be published. The contrast between his cutesy drawing style, the consistency of the illustrations and such themes is considered a point of interest. Illustrations on other themes (refugee crises, fake news, conspiracies) and current events (3D-printed firearms, same-sex marriage, virtual reality, fidget spinners) have been added from time to time. Around February 2016, when gacha games became problematic, an illustration of a person using a giant gashapon machine was uploaded.

The short interval between events occurring and illustrations portraying them attracted attention in early 2016, and again in March 2019, when Mifune published an illustration based on a Japanese Internet meme of a pufferfish vomiting water. His announcement of the illustration on Twitter attracted 15,000 retweets.

In March 2016, Mifune announced the temporary cessation of current affairs illustrations, with the sentiment that if he continued, Irasutoya would become less like a hobby and more like a job. Around two months later, an illustration parodying two-year mobile phone contracts was released.

== Collaborations ==
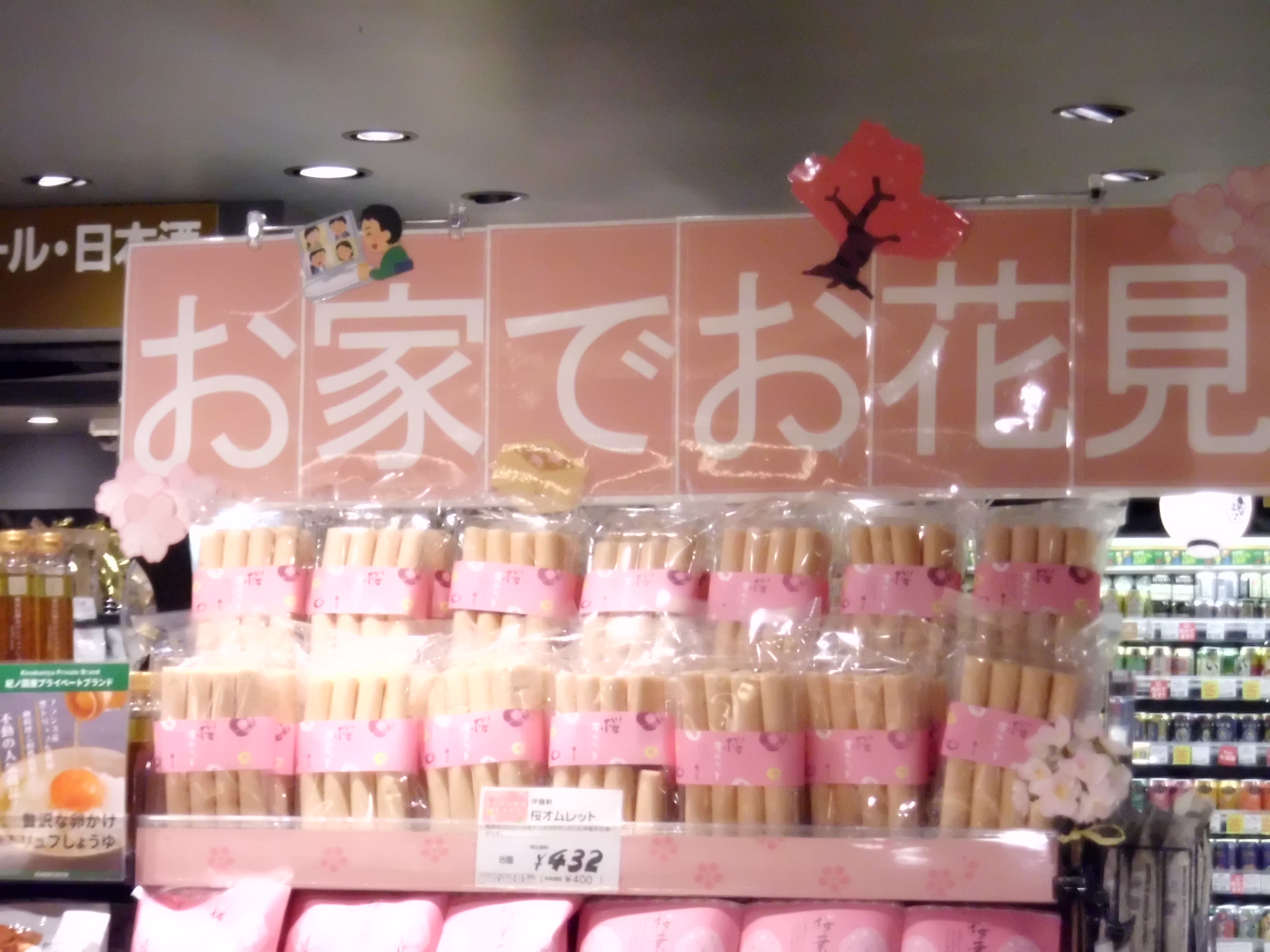
Irasutoya illustrations attached to a sign in a store

Irasutoya-embroidered handkerchiefs were sold at Nakamise-dōri in Asakusa from 25 December 2017 with five different illustrations (boy, girl, boy and Kaminarimon, girl and Kaminarimon, and animals).

A 2018 collaboration café with Kamakura Coffee appeared for a limited time from 23 January to 1 April. That same year, in collaboration with I'm Standing on a Million Lives, serialised in Bessatsu Shōnen Magazine, a special "Wakeari Free Edition" in which all panels from the latest five volumes were replaced with Irasutoya material was published for free on Kodansha's "Magamega" website and in Weekly Shōnen Magazine. Alongside the first episode of I'm Standing on a Million Lives's first anime season, the "Wakeari Version" was broadcast in October 2020.

To celebrate the 1000th episode of the One Piece manga, 20 illustrations of characters from the work—the first Irasutoya illustrations of copyrighted characters—were released on 4 January 2021. Permission was granted by Shueisha for use within the pre-existing terms, as long as the use does not damage the image of the work.

In November 2021, Irasutoya collaborated with Made in Abyss on a series of online lottery merchandise. In January 2022, the chocolate "Irasutoya Box" was sold in collaboration with Japanese confectioner Tirol-Choco. In March that year, Irasutoya collaborated with Sesame Street on a large stuffed toy featuring Cookie Monster and Elmo, and announced the release of Line stamps in collaboration with Idolish7 the following month.

In October 2019, Irasutoya collaborated with the Touken Ranbu franchise on a series of LINE app stickers titled "Waku Waku! Honmaru stamp." In 2024, this series received a second volume. The popularity of both stamp series saw them be converted into various pieces of physical merchandise, such as can badges and bangs clips.

== Awards ==
- 2019 - Society for Digital Archiving '1st Society Award' Practice Prize (2018)
- 2022 - Digital Media Association 'Digital Content of the Year '21 / 27th AMD Awards' Excellence Award (FY 2021)

== See also ==
- Stock illustration
- Stock photography
