= Nishiki =

Nishiki is the Japanese word for "brocade" (see Saga Nishiki). Nishiki may also refer to:

== Companies ==
- Nishiki (bicycle company), initially a U.S. marketed bicycle brand, made in Japan by Kawamura

== Fictional characters ==
- Kamen Rider Nishiki, A character from Kamen Rider Hibiki
- Nishiki Nakajima, a fictional character from the anime/manga series Strike Witches
- Akira Nishikiyama (often nicknamed "Nishiki"), a character from the Yakuza (series) games
- Nishiki Nishio, a character from manga/anime series Tokyo Ghoul

== Food ==
- Yamada Nishiki, famous rice for brewing sake
- Nishiki rice, a California medium grain rice

== People ==
- Niimi Nishiki
- Yasunori Nishiki (西木 康智; born 1985), Japanese composer

== Places ==
- Nishiki, Akita
- Nishiki, Kumamoto
- Nishiki, Yamaguchi
- Nishiki Market, a famous marketplace in downtown Kyoto
- Nishiki River
- Nishiki Station

== Other ==
- Bizen Nishiki, a Japanese Thoroughbred racehorse.

== See also ==
- Nishiki-e
