= Botan Rice Candy =

Japanese brand of confectionery

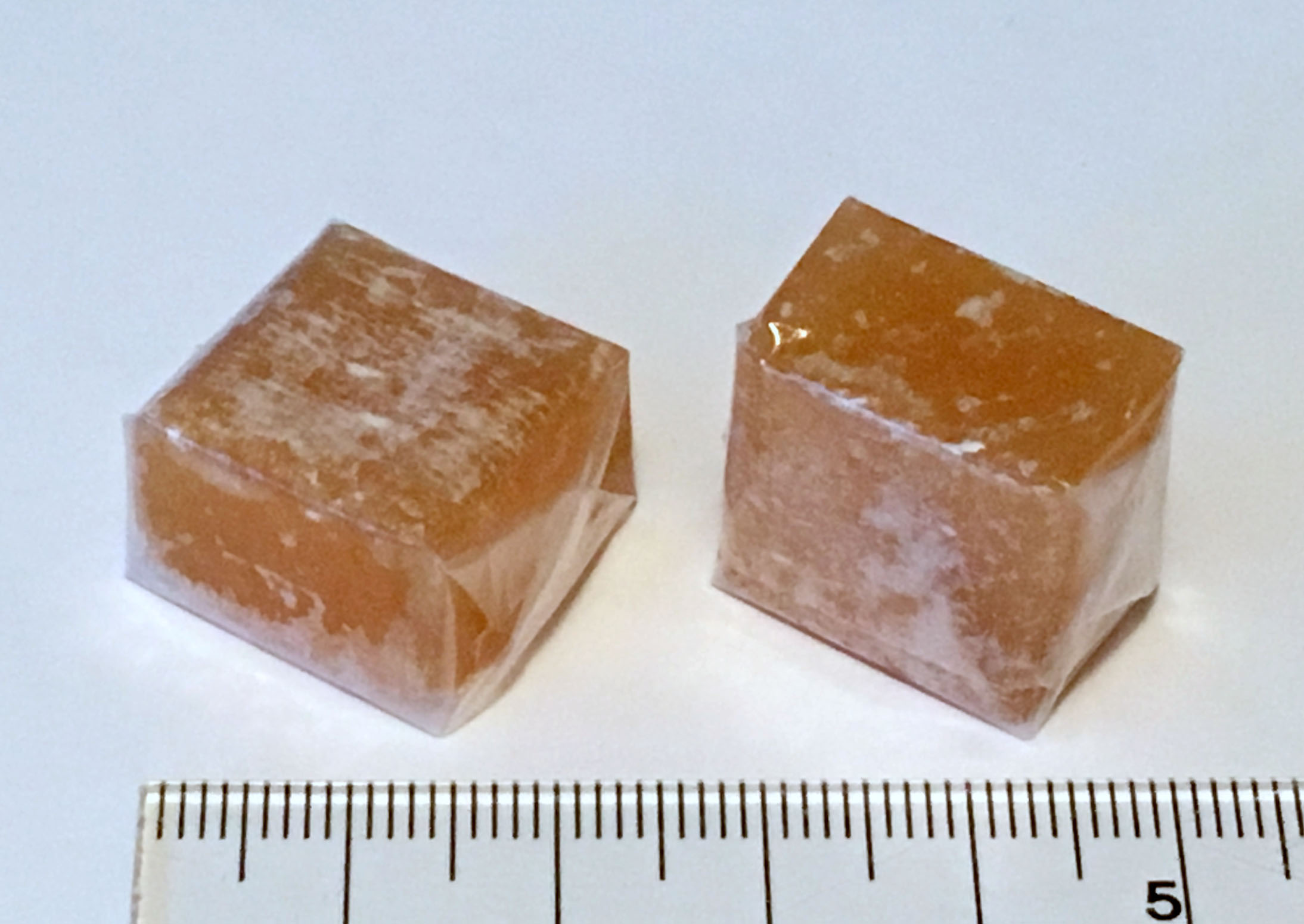
Bontan-ame

Botan Rice Candy is a specific brand of a category of Japanese candy called bontan ame (ボンタンアメ). Bontan ame are soft, chewy, citrus-flavored candy with an outer layer of oblaat. The rice paper is clear and plastic-like when dry, but it is edible and dissolves in the mouth. This candy was invented by Seika Foods in 1924. During this period, more and more Western-style sweets were becoming popular in Japanese society, and the appearance of this type of candy is intentionally similar to Western-style caramel candies. In Japan, these candies are sold as dagashi, cheap candies and snacks marketed to Japanese schoolchildren, and are often in small sizes with bright colorful packaging with stickers or prizes included.

Bontan (ボンタン) is a variant spelling of buntan (ブンタン), the Japanese word for pomelo, which is commonly used as a flavoring.

== Botan Rice Candy ==
The specific brand Botan Rice Candy is an iconic export whose packaging for the American market has remained essentially unchanged for decades. This brand is currently imported to North America from Japan by JFC International.

JFC's Botan Rice Candies come in a small cardboard box which contains 3/4 oz (21 g) of candy. Each box contains six individual pieces and a sticker. The candy's name, Botan (hiragana: ぼたん), is a pun on the name of the larger category bontan ame: botan means peony, but the brand also has the traditional bontan (pomelo) citrus flavor. A peony blossom is shown on the label, next to an inu hariko, a traditional Japanese papier-mâché dog.

=== Ingredients ===
Glucose syrup (corn starch, water), sugar, sweet rice, water, lemon flavoring, orange flavoring and Allura Red AC.

Alternate ingredients list: Mizuame (millet starch, water), sugar, sweet rice, water, lemon flavoring, orange flavoring, and Allura Red AC.

United States import version: corn syrup, sugar, water, glutinous rice flour, wafer paper (potato starch, sweet potato starch, rapeseed oil, soy lecithin), natural flavor and Allura Red AC.

=== Nutritional information ===
Serving size: 6 pieces (3/4 oz (21 g))
Servings per container: 1
Calories: 60
Calories from fat: 0
Total fat: 0.0g
Sodium: 0 mg
Total carbohydrate: 14g
Sugars: 2g
Protein: 0g

== Other brands ==
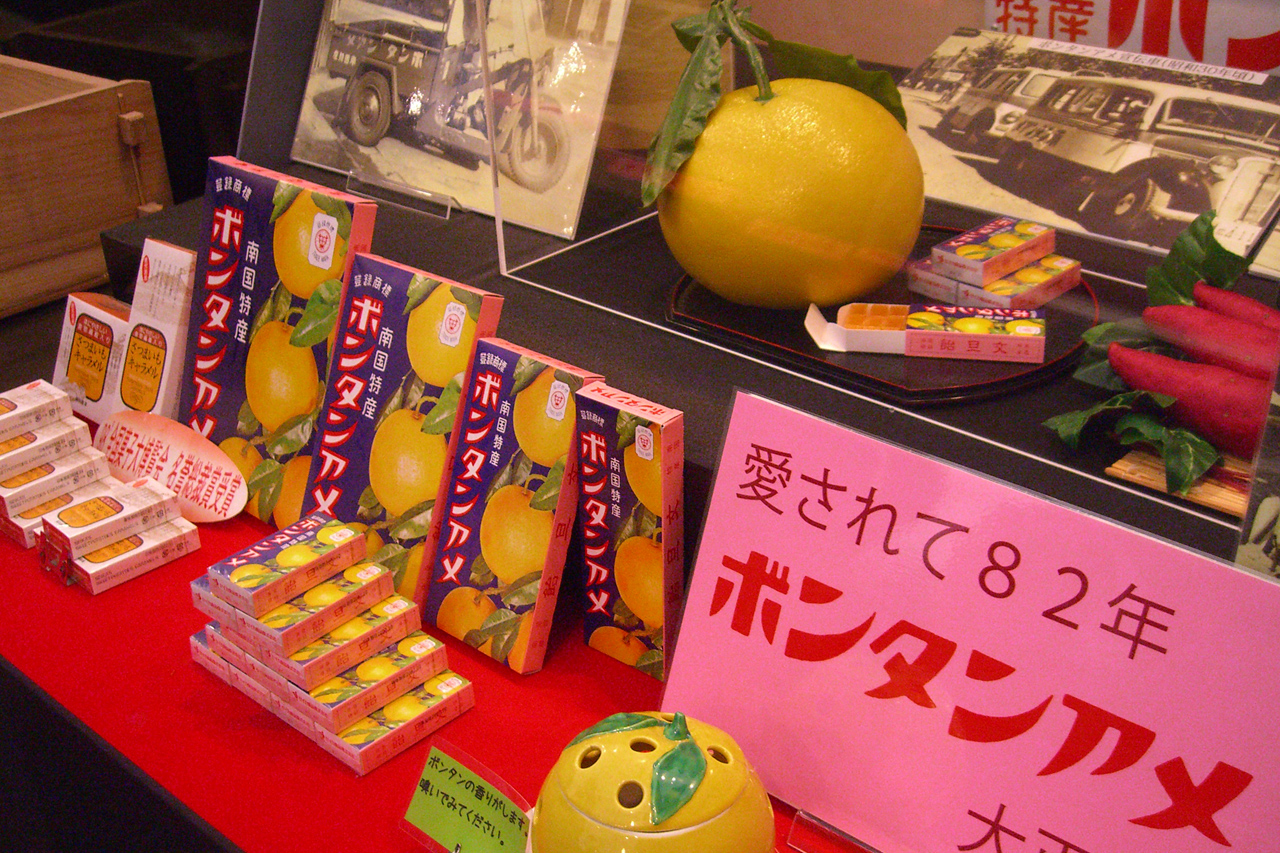
Seika Foods' Bontan Ame

Seika Foods created the original Bontan Ame in 1924. They also sell some other variants such as Pineapple Ame. Another brand of the same candy is Tomoe Ame, with similar taste, packaging, and insert stickers. Other brands of bontan ame include Satsumaimo and Hyōrokumochi (Six Soldier Mochi).

== See also ==
- Dango
- Dagashi
- Hyōroku mochi
