= Stock illustration =

Stock illustrations (often called stock photographs) used by creative professionals as a method of visual communication. They are found in reports, news media, advertising, and websites. They are abundant and available online through several stock art agencies, many of which sell both photographs and illustrations. Today stock photos can be purchased through a subscription and downloaded from a stock photography distributor's website or purchased as a CD-ROM collection. Buying stock art is convenient for those who are looking for high-quality images without spending too much time and spending only what their budgets allow. Stock images (that includes stock photography, vectors, and illustrations) have many perks for businesses and digital market, but the main, most immediate and evident benefits are the time and money savings.

== Types ==
Stock illustrations fall into two main categories: royalty free and rights managed. The choice between royalty free or rights managed illustrations depends on buyers' needs. For instance, royalty-free illustrations may be used many times with few restrictions and for multiple projects, e.g. annual reports, brochures, newsletters, magazines, newspapers, books, and websites, for one flat fee. That is because the pricing of a royalty-free illustration is determined by the size of the illustration and not its specific use. Illustration sizes vary from the low resolution that are suitable for the web to high resolution or vector graphics images that are suitable for printed media.

Rights-managed illustrations may benefit those who need exclusive use of images. Unlike royalty-free stock illustrations, prices for rights-managed illustrations are determined by the medium where the illustrations will appear such as the web or printed media, distribution, and the duration for which the image will be used.

While many stock art agencies sell both photos and illustrations, some sell only illustrations. The following companies sell only illustrations, but that list is neither definitive nor complete: Ikon Images, Illustration Works, Laughing Stock, Stock Illustration Source, ImageZoo, and Ecliptic Stock Illustrations. Ikon Images and Laughing Stock sell only rights-managed images. Illustration Works and Stock Illustration Source sell both rights-managed and royalty-free images, while ImageZoo and Ecliptic Stock Illustrations are two of the many illustration companies that specialize in royalty-free illustrations. The two companies that have been in business longest are Illustration Works and Stock Illustration Source. Illustration Works established the first searchable online internet site in 1996 and brought stock illustrations to the digital market that was emerging for stock images.

== See also ==
- Stock photography
- Irasutoya
