= Playground parachute =

Round sheet used for children's games

A group of children playing under a parachute.

A playground parachute is a round, multicolored, nylon sheet commonly 20 to 30 feet in diameter. It may or may not have handles on the periphery. It is used by arranging children on the outside, who then vigorously wave the parachute up and down. Playground parachutes are commonly used in kindergarten and early elementary school physical education classes, gymnastics classes, and organized recess, but is aimed for people of all ages.

== Games played with a playground parachute ==
Some activities with a playground parachute include:

- Cat and mouse: One child is placed on top of the parachute, and up to three children under the parachute. The cat tries to tag the mice, but the mice are hidden by the wavelike movement of the parachute.
- Ball games: One or many beach balls or playground balls are placed on top of the parachute. The teacher may try to encourage teamwork by getting the children to catapult the ball by working in unison.
- Parachute toss: Similar to blanket toss, but someone is sitting in the middle of a parachute. At the count of three, the children attempt to lift the person in the center off the ground and into the air. This does require some strength and teamwork, depending on the weight of the person and the children must be able to bring him/her back down to the ground in safety.
- Ring Around the Rosie: This traditional nursery rhyme game can also be played with a parachute as the children walk in a circle while holding on to the parachute. Then, when the children say, "We all fall down!", they sit on the ground as the parachute goes up, making an air bubble.
- Circus Tent: The parachute is brought up, then the children raise their part of the parachutes over their heads and behind their back, and sit down. This creates an air pocket which resembles a circus tent. This game is also sometimes called, "Mushroom" or "Tent".
- Trading Spaces: At the count of three, the parachute is brought up and the teacher may call out any of the colors the children are holding, the color across from each of the children (this is used only with a parachute that has an odd number of each of the colors on the parachute), or just the children's names. After the teacher does so, those kids will run under the parachute and switch places with another kid.
- Shark and Lifeguard: A child will go under the parachute and pick a victim to be pulled under, the victim will shout 'Lifeguard!' if the child who is the lifeguard didn't pull the victim out in time he/she will suddenly become a shark and so on.
- Popcorn: The teacher places a number of beanbags, small balls, or cotton balls onto the middle of the parachute. Then, the children shake the parachute to make them pop up like "popcorn".
- Washing Machine: The teacher places one child to sit cross legged in the middle of the parachute and mimes pouring laundry soap and fabric softener on top. Then the teacher and other children walk around in a circle to enclose the child and this gets progressively smaller. When all the parachute has been wrapped around the middle child and there is not much left, on the count of three the teacher and other children rapidly move outwards, which causes the child in the middle to spin around.
