= JFC International =

Japanese-based food services company

JFC International Inc.
- Formerly: Japan Food Corporation
- Company type: Subsidiary
- Founded: 1958; 68 years ago in San Francisco, California, United States
- Headquarters: Los Angeles, California, United States
- Parent: Kikkoman
- Website: www.jfc.com

JFC International is a major wholesaler and distributor of Asian food products in the United States. In addition to its own products, JFC International also imports branded products from other international companies. The company's official establishment was in 1958 and later named JFC International in 1978, however the company existed in various forms beginning in 1906. It is owned by the Japanese company Kikkoman.

== Operations ==
JFC's brands include Nishiki, Dynasty, JFC, Wel-Pac, Hime and Hapi. Under its brands the company sells Botan Rice candy, Nishiki rice and other Japanese food items.
