= Nishiki, Kumamoto =

Nishiki 錦町
- Town
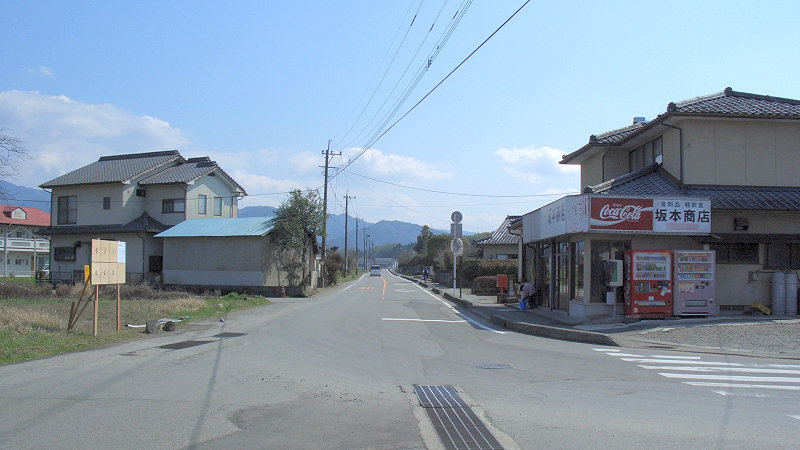
- Higo-nishinomura station front

- Flag Chapter
- Location of Nishiki in Kumamoto Prefecture

- Location in Japan
- Coordinates: 32°12′04″N 130°50′28″E
- Country: Japan
- Region: Kyushu
- Prefecture: Kumamoto
- District: Kuma

Area
  - Total: 85.04 km^{2} (32.83 sq mi)

Population (August 31, 2024)
  - Total: 10,046
  - Density: 118.1/km^{2} (306.0/sq mi)
- Time zone: UTC+09:00 (JST)
- City hall address: 1587 Ichibu, Nishiki-cho, Kuma-gun, Kumamoto-ken 868-0392
- Website: Official website
- Symbols
- Bird: Meadow bunting
- Flower: Rose
- Tree: Fagaceae

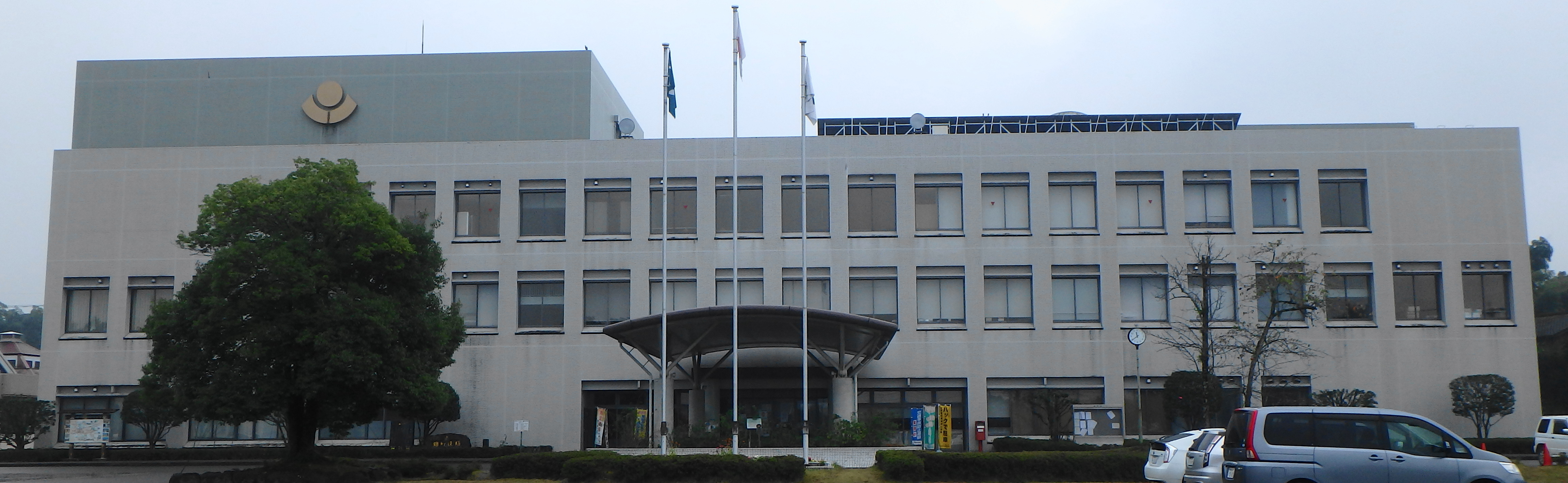
Nishiki Town Hall

Nishiki (錦町, Nishiki-machi) (Note: In some translations, especially machine based, the name is mis-translated as Nishikicho (Nishiki-cho).) is a town located in Kuma District, Kumamoto Prefecture, Japan. As of 31 August 2024, the town had an estimated population of 10,046 in 3975 households, and a population density of 49 persons per km^{2}. The total area of the town is 85.04 km^{2} (32.83 sq mi). The town's name is the Japanese word for "brocade", and is used as a name for more than one town in Japan.

== Geography ==
Nishiki is located in the southern part of Kumamoto prefecture, approximately 70 kilometers south-southeast of the prefectural capital at Kumamoto, Kumamoto. The northern portion of the town lies in flat terrain that forms part of the Hitoyoshi Basin; the Kuma River borders the town to the east and west. The southern reaches of the Kyushu Mountains adjoins one corner of the town limits. The southernmost corner of the townsland meets the prefectural border with Miyazaki Prefecture.

=== Neighboring municipalities ===
Kumamoto Prefecture

- Asagiri
- Hitoyoshi
- Sagara

Miyazaki Prefecture

- Ebino

=== Climate ===
Nishiki has a humid subtropical climate (Köppen Cfa) characterized by warm summers and cool winters with light to no snowfall. The average annual temperature in Nishiki is 14.7 °C. The average annual rainfall is 2328 mm with September as the wettest month. The temperatures are highest on average in August, at around 25.0 °C, and lowest in January, at around 3.7 °C.

=== Demographics ===
Per Japanese census data, the population of Nishiki is as shown below

Historical population
Year	Pop.	±%
1940	9,334	—
1950	13,891	+48.8%
1960	13,989	+0.7%
1970	10,859	−22.4%
1980	10,679	−1.7%
1990	11,728	+9.8%
2000	11,975	+2.1%
2010	11,075	−7.5%
2020	10,288	−7.1%

== History ==
The area of Nishiki was part of ancient Higo Province, During the Edo Period it was part of the holdings of Hitoyoshi Domain. After the Meiji restoration, the villages of Ichibu, Nishi and Kinoue were established with the creation of the modern municipalities system on April 1, 1889. The three villages were merged on July 1, 1955, to form the village of Nishiki, which was elevated to town status on April 1, 1965.

=== World War II ===
During the closing years of the Second World War, a major base of the Imperial Japanese Navy's Hitoyoshi Naval Air Group was located near the town. Relatively little is currently known about the base and its operations due to a loss of records and institutional memory both during and after the war. The remains of the base extend over 36,000 m^{2} (390,000 sq ft) of land, and houses underground facilities in more than 10 locations, including an operations room and a large torpedo preparation area. In 2015, a full archeological survey of the site was initiated by the municipal government via the Nishiki board of education to discover more about the base and its past, with a view to eventually opening it up to tourism. This followed the discovery by the local government of a copy of a floor plan for the base.

== Government ==
Nishiki has a mayor-council form of government with a directly elected mayor and a unicameral town council of 11 members. Nishiki, collectively with the other municipalities of Kuma District, contributes two members to the Kumamoto Prefectural Assembly. In terms of national politics, the town is part of the Kumamoto 4th district of the lower house of the Diet of Japan.

=== Flag ===
The current town flag was adopted in 1956, however there is no formal flag law codifying this. The flag is green with a town emblem in the center. The emblem is a stylized katakana ニNi of Nishiki. The circle "symbolizes a reconciliation and the mountain, the river and the sun do the town located in the center of Kuma Basin which is expanding to the future".

== Economy ==
The town's economy is primarily based around agriculture (primarily pear, peach and rice cultivation) and leisure tourism activities such as golf holidays, though the Nishiki plant of Renesas Semiconductor (formerly NEC Kumamoto) is also a major contributor. The Nishiki plant specializes in LSI manufacturing. The total economic output of Nishiki for fiscal year 2004 was ¥40.7 billion yen.

== Education ==
Nishiki has three public elementary schools and one public junior high schools operated by the town government, and two public high schools operated by the Kumamoto Prefectural Board of Education.

== Transportation ==
=== Railway ===
Kumagawa Railroad - Yunomae Line

- Higo-Nishimura - Ichibu - Kinoe

=== Highway ===
- National Route 219
