= Parachute (drugs) =

Method of swallowing drugs

Parachuting or bombing is a method of swallowing drugs by rolling or folding powdered or crushed drugs in a piece of edible paper to ingest. It is sometimes called a "snow bomb", especially if using cocaine. This method is used among many pharmaceuticals that are commonly crushed for recreational use. The toilet paper method must use single ply toilet paper or one must separate the layers of double ply. Tissues are also a common material for this method of drug ingestion. Another common paper used is rolling paper for smoking herbal substances or tobacco. Rice or starch papers known as oblaat in Japan is a method that is becoming more popular. Opioids, amphetamines, benzodiazepines and other narcotics are commonly parachuted. This method's purpose is recreational because the drugs become absorbed all at once when the paper unravels in one's stomach.
