= Tirol-Choco =

Japanese candy company

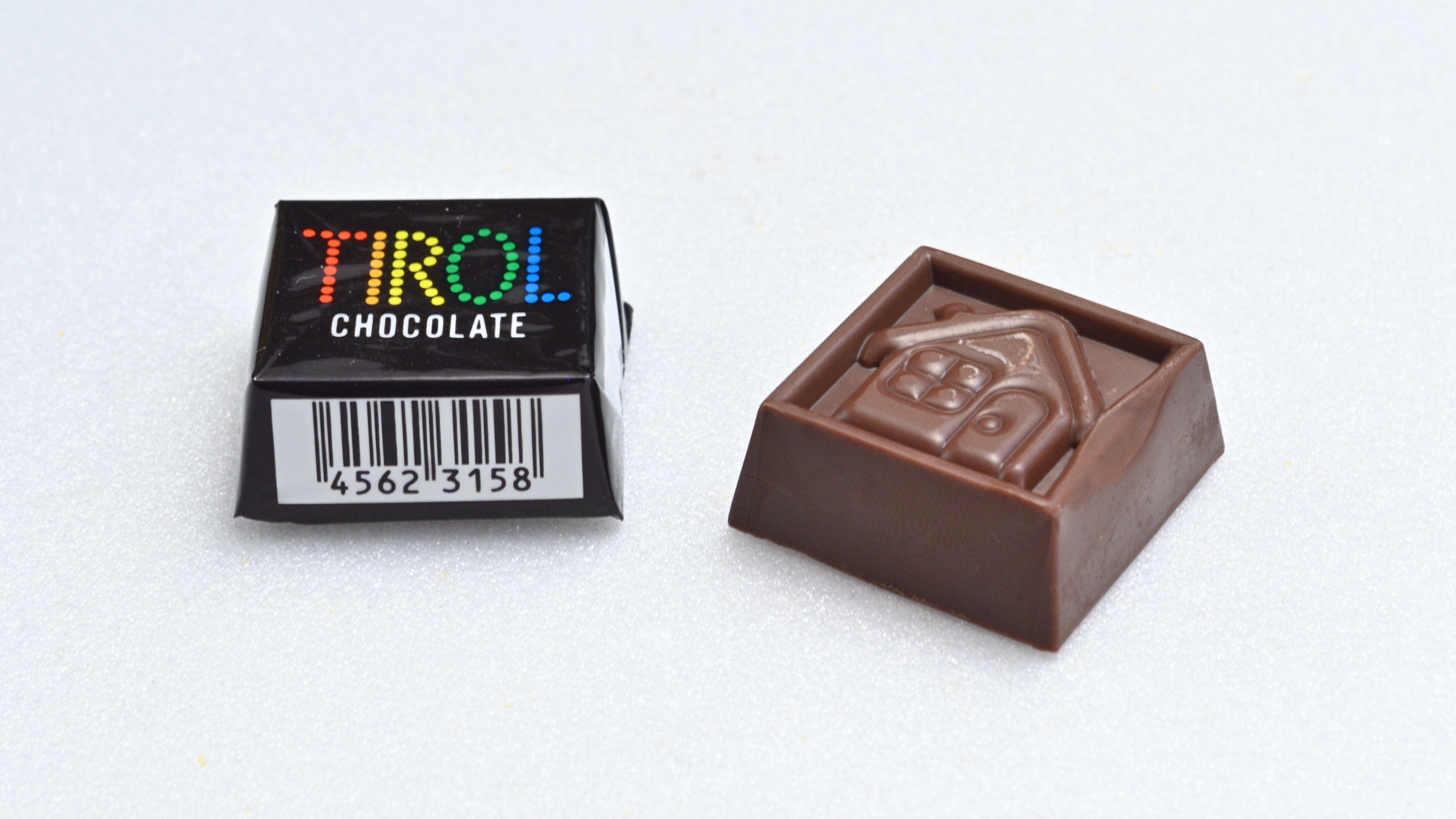
A Tirol chocolate

Tirol-Choco Co., Ltd. (Japanese: チロルチョコ株式会社, Hepburn: Chiroru choko kabushiki-gaisha) is a Japanese confectionery company, known by their pocket-sized square chocolate candies, usually costing 10 to 30 yen. Tirol Choco originated from the Matsuo Seika (松尾製菓) confectionery company, founded in 1903. The original, coffee nougat-filled Tirol chocolate was created in 1962; since then, the company created several candy varieties.

== History ==
Matsuo Seika was founded in 1903 as a confectionery manufacturer in Ita-mura, Tagawa-gun (now Tagawa), Fukuoka Prefecture, and in 1919,as Matsuo Seika Co. The Matsuo family originally lived in Akizuki, Asakura County (now Asakura City), but after a business failure, they moved to Tagawa, which was prospering from coal mining, and began manufacturing and selling sugar confections and candy to coal miners. The company's caramels, which were sold separately in 1948, were a hit and the business expanded, but sales slumped due to the recession, so at the idea of the second president, Yoshinobu Matsuo, and with the cooperation of Morozoff, they developed inexpensive chocolate that children could buy.

In 1962, the company established a chocolate division and began selling the product under the brand name “Tirol”, inspired by the Austrian region in the Alps. The price was lowered by using syrup as the chocolate filling, and the company began selling the chocolates in a series of three bite-sized mounds. In 1973, when the prices was raised due to a sharp rise in raw material prices following the oil crisis, sales were sluggish, so the chocolate was reduced from three to one square-shaped mound and the price was returned to 10 yen, and sales recovered. Toshihiko Matsuo, who had trained at Nabisco, became president and worked to expand the sales network.

== See also ==
- Chocolate in Japan
