= Nishiki rice =

Brand of California-grown, medium grain rice

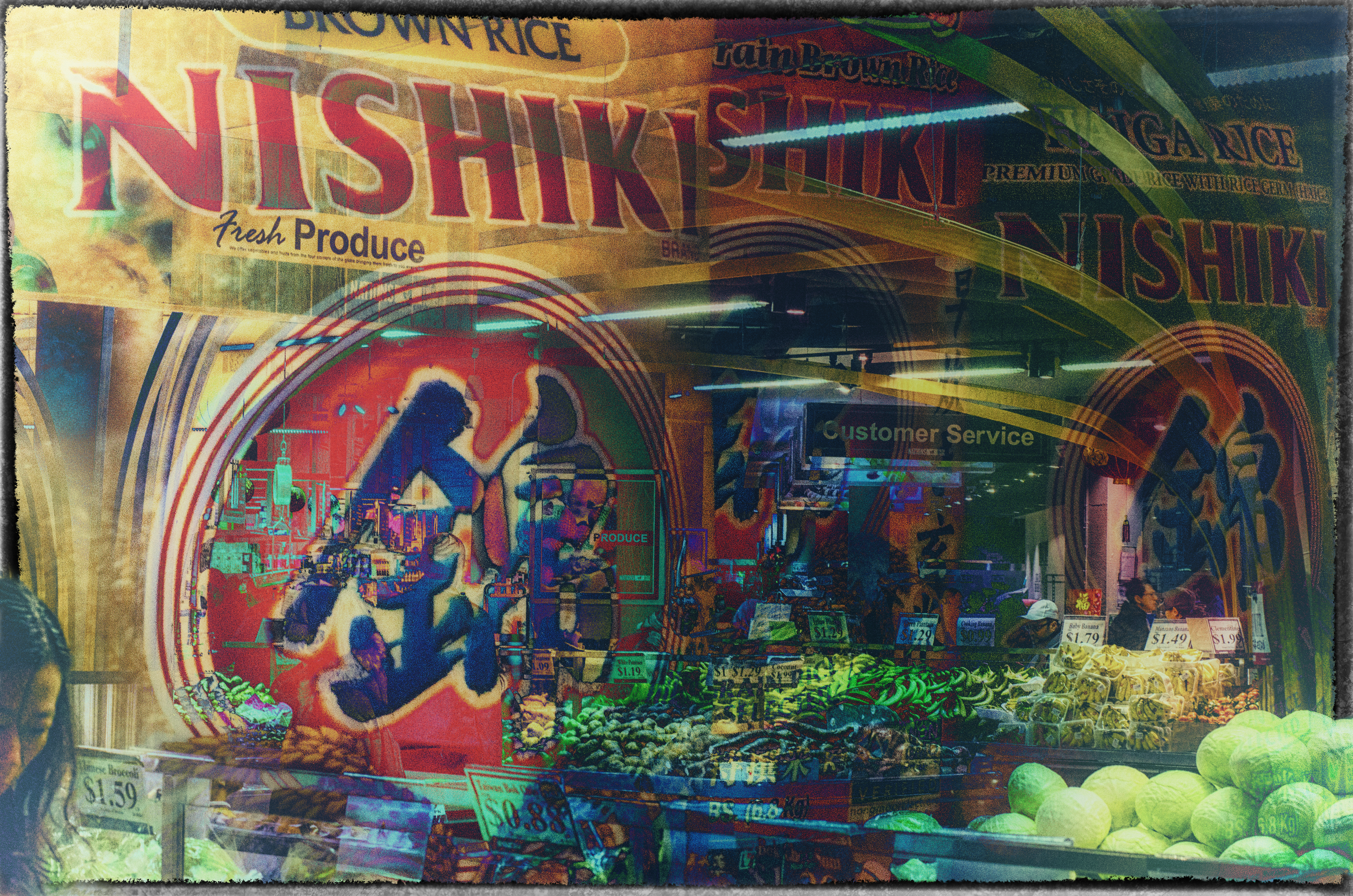
Nishiki rice

Nishiki (Japanese: 錦, "brocade," a character that the brand also uses as its logo) is a brand of California-grown, medium grain rice sold by JFC International. The species of Nishiki Brand Rice is known as New Variety, which includes Kokuho Rose and M401. New Variety is a medium-grain rice, very similar to Calrose rice (M201 and M202).

In Japan, some unrelated breeds of rice also have "Nishiki" in their names, such as Yamada Nishiki, which is used to brew sake.
