= Kyabetsu Tarō =

Japanese snack

- Japanese snack food
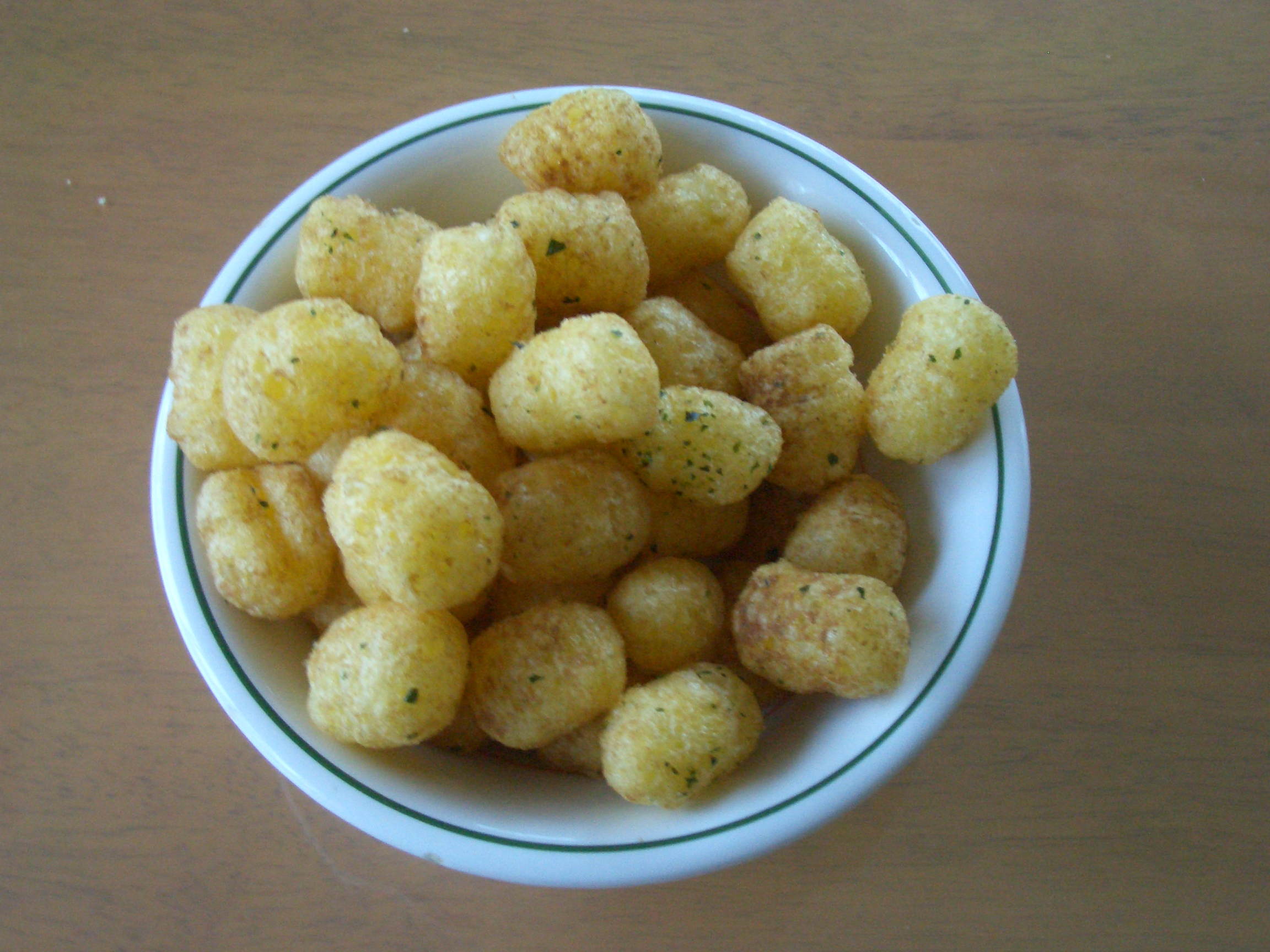
- Japanese name: キャベツ太郎
- Maker: Kadō
- Ingredients: maize flour
- Flavours: sauce only

Kyabetsu Tarō (Japanese: キャベツ太郎; Tarō being a common Japanese male first name) (Note: Despite the name (kyabetsu is the transliteration of the Japanese word for cabbage) the snack does not list cabbage in its ingredients.) is a Japanese snack food made by the Kadō (菓道) company of Ibaraki Prefecture. It consists of balls of corn about 3 cm in diameter flavoured with small pieces of nori and Japanese brown sauce. It is a relatively low-cost snack aimed at children. It is sold in two bag sizes, a 20-yen and a 100-yen bag. The package shows a frog wearing a policeman's hat. Kyabetsu Tarō is widely listed among the most popular snacks in Japan.

== See also ==
- List of Japanese snacks
