= Big Katsu =

Japanese snack

- Japanese snack food
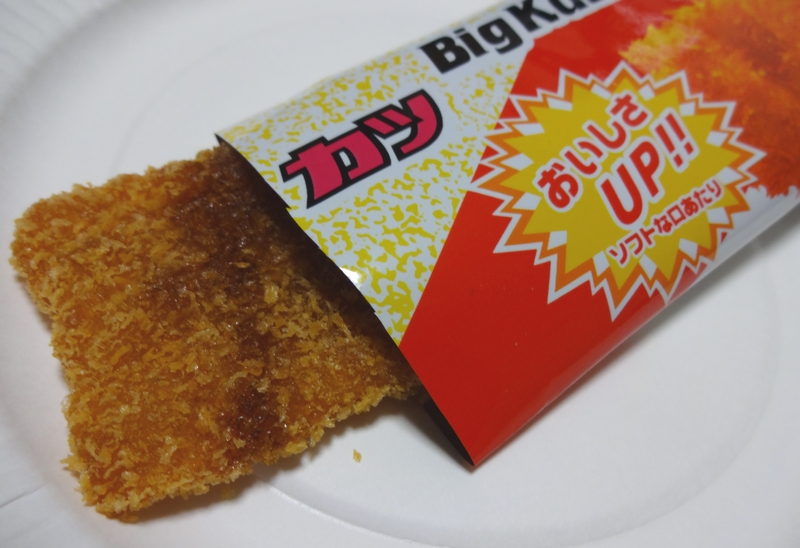
- Japanese name: ビッグカツ
- Maker: Kadō
- Ingredients: Fish surimi, flour, breadcrumbs, vegetable oil, sauce, chicken extract, eggs, shrimp powder, spices, flavoring

Big Katsu (ビッグカツ, biggu katsu) is a type of Japanese snack food. In name and appearance it is similar to breaded pork cutlets, but instead of pork it contains shredded fish surimi. Many varieties are available at convenience stores as well as snack shops, but the best-known and most popular may be the original Big Katsu from Kadō, first introduced in 1987.

== See also ==
- List of Japanese snacks
