= Capsule (pharmacy) =

Relatively stable shell containing medicine

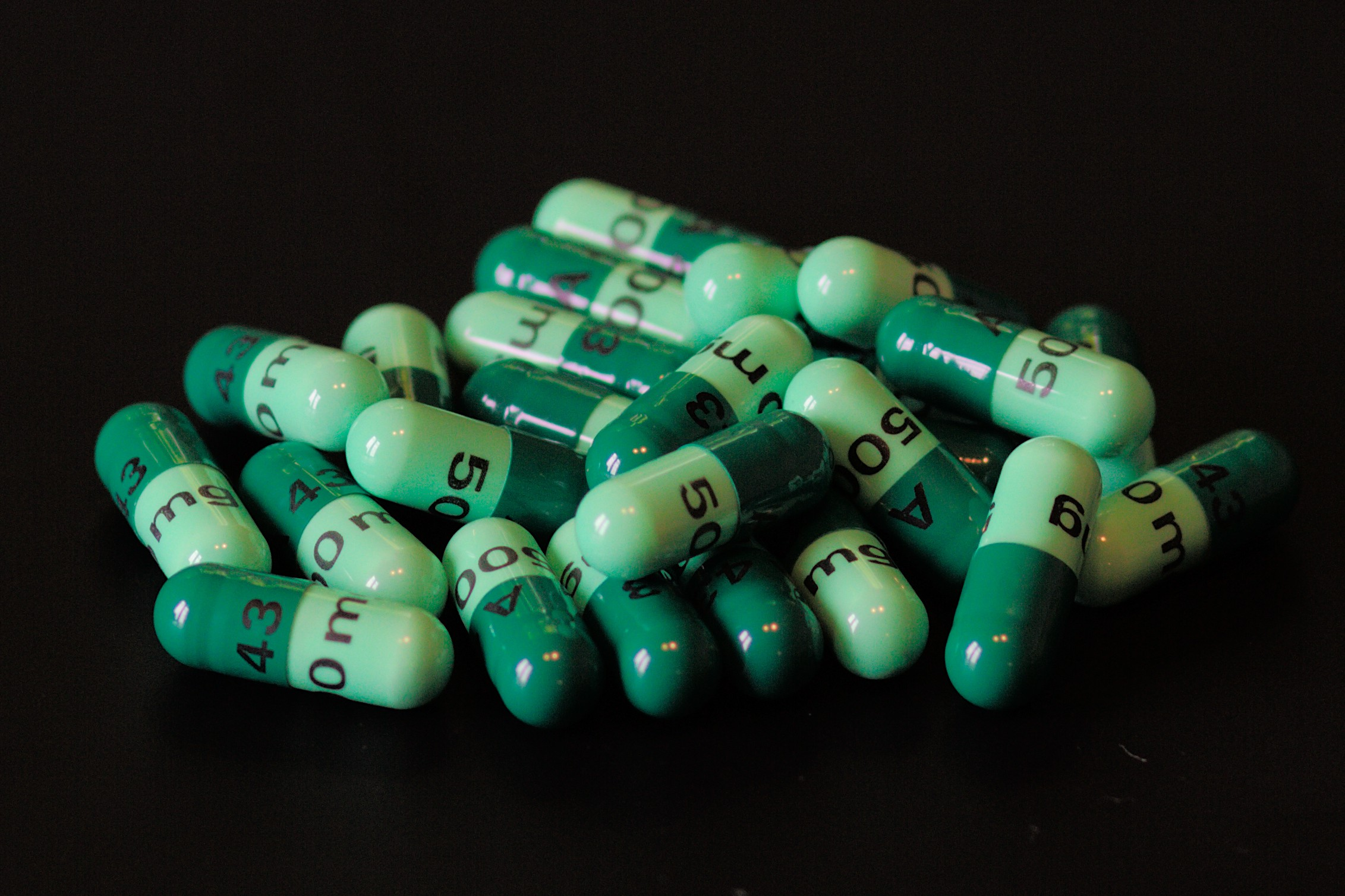
Capsules

In the manufacture of pharmaceuticals, encapsulation refers to a range of dosage forms—techniques used to enclose medicines—in a relatively stable shell known as a capsule, allowing them to, for example, be taken orally or be used as suppositories. The two main types of capsules are:

- Hard-shelled capsules, which contain dry, powdered ingredients or miniature pellets made by e.g. processes of extrusion or spheronization. These are made in two-halves: a smaller-diameter "body" that is filled and then sealed using a larger-diameter "cap".
- Soft-shelled capsules, primarily used for oils and for active ingredients that are dissolved or suspended in oil.

Both of these classes of capsules are made from aqueous solutions of gelling agents, such as animal protein (mainly gelatin) or plant polysaccharides or their derivatives (such as carrageenans and modified forms of starch and cellulose). Other ingredients can be added to the gelling agent solution including plasticizers such as glycerin or sorbitol to decrease the capsule's hardness, coloring agents, preservatives, disintegrants, lubricants and surface treatment.

Since their inception, capsules have been viewed by consumers as the most efficient method of taking medication. For this reason, producers of drugs such as OTC analgesics wanting to emphasize the strength of their product developed the "caplet", a portmanteau of "capsule-shaped tablet", to tie this positive association to more efficiently produced tablet pills, as well as being an easier-to-swallow shape than the usual disk-shaped tablet medication.

== Single-piece gel encapsulation ("soft capsules") ==
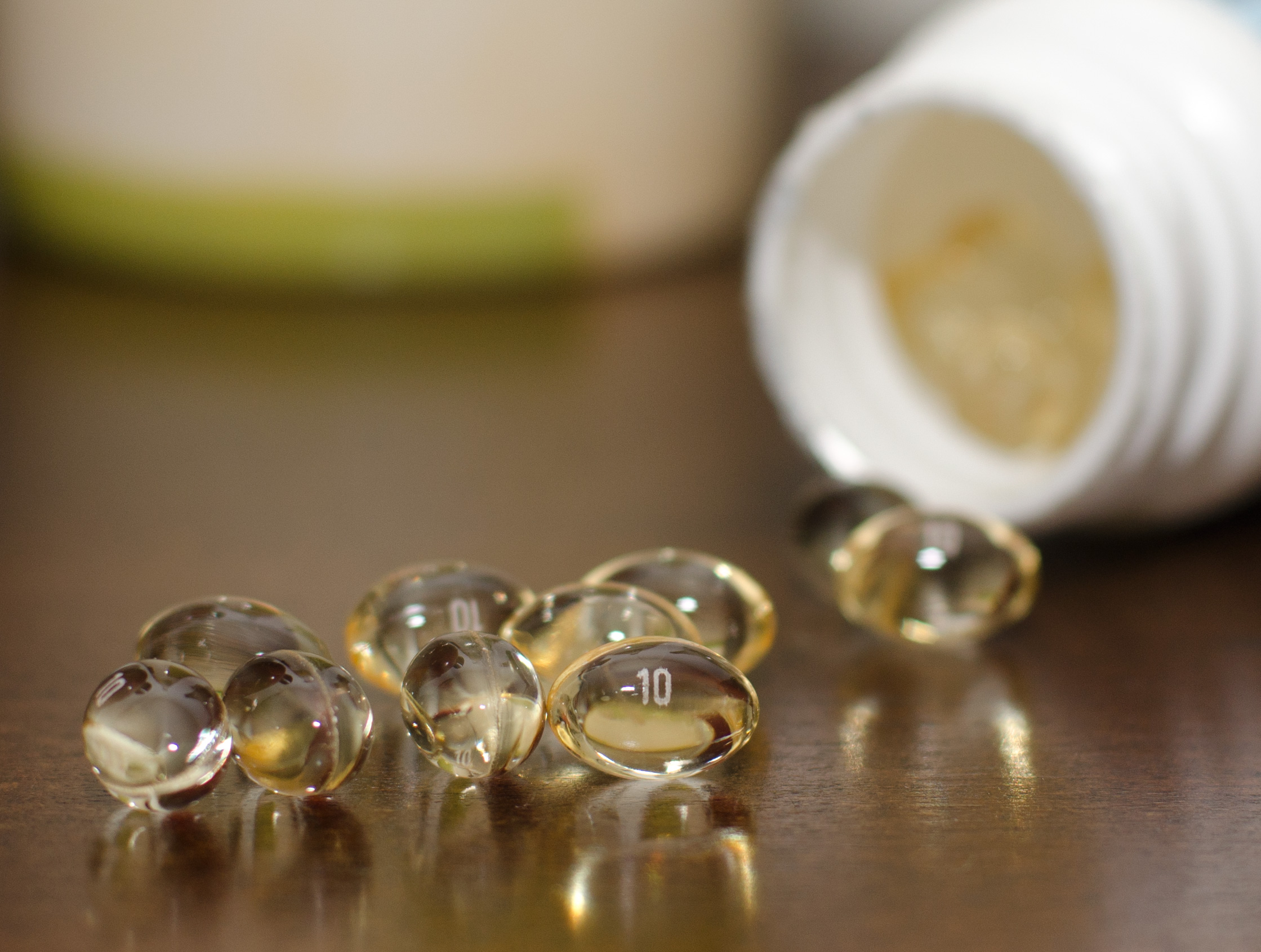
Soft gel capsules.

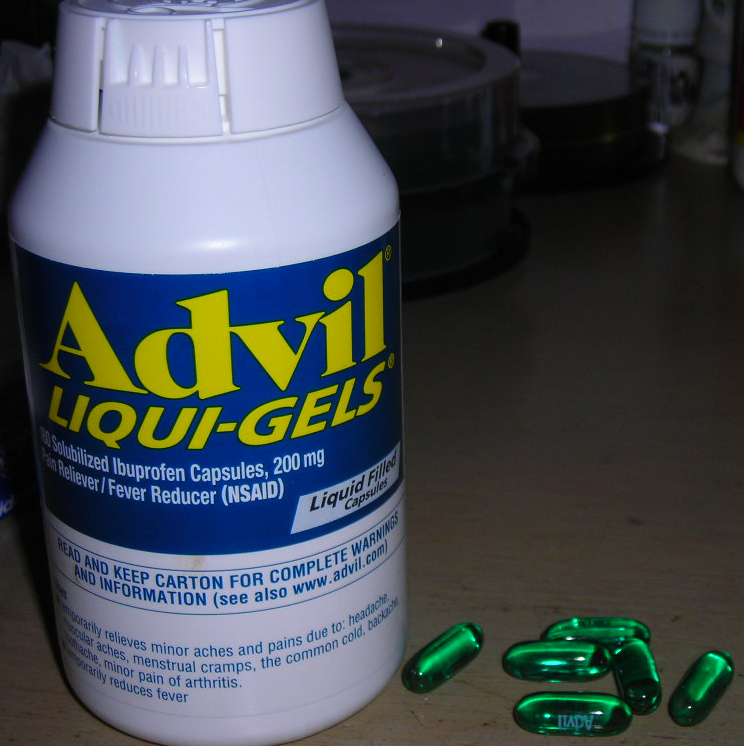
Advil liqui-gels

In 1833, Mothes and Dublanc were granted a patent for a method to produce a single-piece gelatin capsule that was sealed with a drop of gelatin solution. They used individual iron molds for their process, filling the capsules individually with a medicine dropper. Later on, methods were developed that used sets of plates with pockets to form the capsules. Although some companies still use this method, the equipment is no longer produced commercially. All modern soft-gel encapsulation uses variations of a process developed by R. P. Scherer in 1933. His innovation used a rotary die to produce the capsules. They were then filled by blow molding. This method was high-yield, consistent, and reduced waste.

Softgels can be an effective delivery system for oral drugs, especially poorly soluble drugs. This is because the fill can contain liquid ingredients that help increase the solubility or permeability of the drug across the membranes in the body. Liquid ingredients are difficult to include in any other solid dosage form, such as a tablet. Softgels are also highly suited to potent drugs (for example, where the dose is <100 μg), where the highly reproducible filling process helps ensure each softgel has the same drug content, and because the operators are not exposed to any drug dust during the manufacturing process.

In 1949, the Lederle Laboratories division of the American Cyanamid Company developed the "Accogel" process, allowing powders to be accurately filled into soft gelatin capsules.

== Two-piece gel encapsulation ("hard capsules") ==
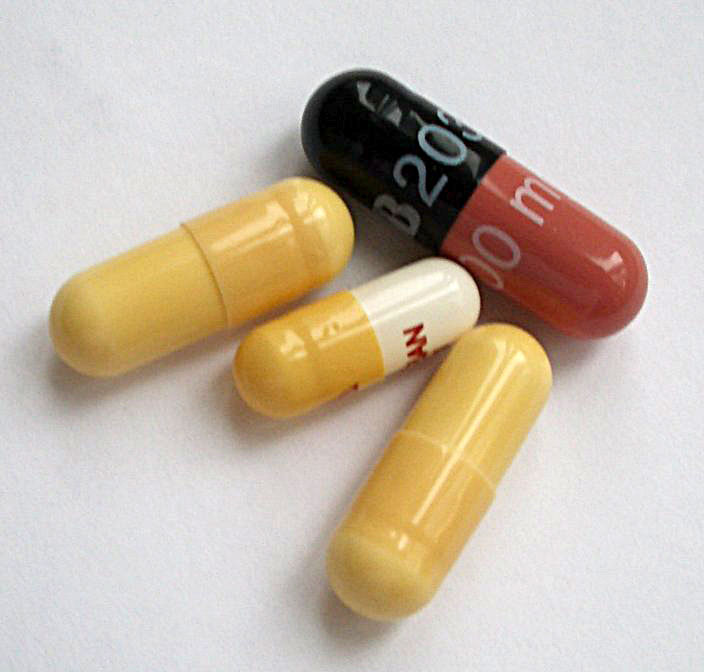
Two-piece, hard starch capsules

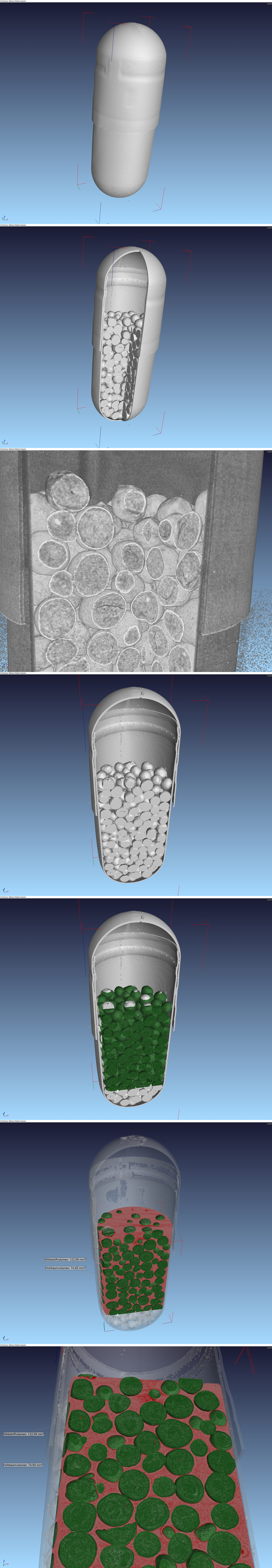
Reconstruction from μCT-data of a hard starch capsule containing Diclofenac. Resolution 18.6 μm/pixel.

Flight through the image stack of the above scan.

James Murdoch of London patented the two-piece telescoping gelatin capsule in 1847. The capsules are made in two parts by dipping metal pins in the gelling agent solution. The capsules are supplied as closed units to the pharmaceutical manufacturer. Before use, the two halves are separated, and the capsule is filled with powder or more normally pellets made by the process of extrusion and spheronization (either by placing a compressed slug of powder into one half of the capsule or by filling one half of the capsule with loose powder) and the other half of the capsule is pressed on. With the compressed slug method, weight varies less between capsules. However, the machinery required to manufacture them is more complex.

The powder or spheroids inside the capsule contains the active ingredients and any excipients, such as binders, disintegrants, fillers, glidant, and preservatives.

== Manufacturing materials ==
Gelatin capsules, informally called gel caps or gelcaps, are composed of gelatin manufactured from the collagen of animal skin or bone.

Vegetable capsules, introduced in 1989, are made from cellulose, a structural component in plants. The main ingredient of vegetarian capsules is hydroxypropyl methyl cellulose. In the 21st century, gelatin capsules are more broadly used than vegetarian capsules because the cost of production is lower.

== Manufacturing equipment ==
The process of encapsulation of hard gelatin capsules can be done on manual, semi-automatic, and automatic capsule filling machines. Hard gelatin capsules are manufactured by the dipping method which is dipping, rotation, drying, stripping, trimming, and joining. Softgels are filled at the same time as they are produced and sealed on the rotary die of a fully automatic machine. Capsule fill weight is a critical attribute in encapsulation and various real-time fill weight monitoring techniques such as near-infrared spectroscopy (NIR) and vibrational spectroscopy are used, as well as in-line weight checks, to ensure product quality.

Volume is measured to the full line, which is customary to the top of the smaller-diameter body half. After capping, some ullage volume (airspace) remains in the finished capsule.

== Standard sizes of two-piece capsules ==
Size	Volume (mL)^{[A]}	Locked length (mm)^{[A]}	External diameter (mm)^{[A]}
5	0.13	11.1	4.91
4	0.20	14.3	5.31
3	0.27	15.9	5.82
2	0.37	18	6.35
1	0.48	19.4	6.91
0	0.67	21.7	7.65
0E	0.7	23.1	7.65
00	0.95	23.3	8.53
000	1.36	26.14	9.91
13	3.2	30	15.3
12	5	40.5	15.3
12el	7.5	57	15.5
11	10	47.5	20.9
10	18	64	23.4
7	24	78	23.4
Su07	28	88.5	23.4

^{A} Approximate

== See also ==
- Capsule endoscopy
- OROS
- Pharmacy automation
- Pharmaceutical formulation
- Pill splitting
- Tablet
- Oblaat
