= Yatake Station =

Railway station in Hitoyoshi, Kumamoto Prefecture, Japan

Yatake Station 矢岳駅
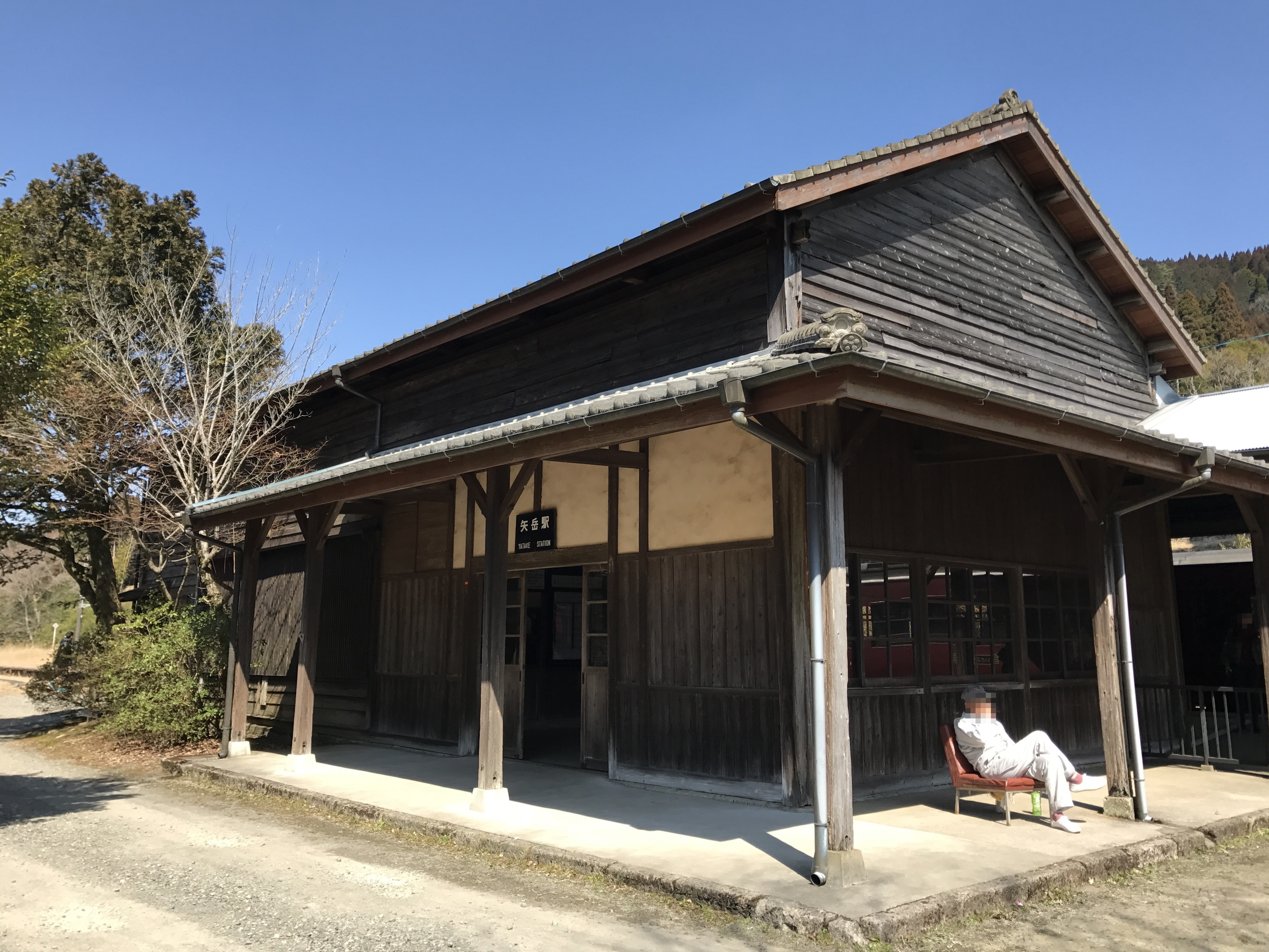
- Yatake Station in March 2017

General information
- Location: Yatake-machi, Hitoyoshi; Kumamoto Prefecture （熊本県人吉市矢岳町） Japan
- Coordinates: 32°06′15″N 130°46′11″E
- Operator: JR Kyushu
- Line: ■ Hisatsu Line

Other information
- Website: Official website

History
- Opened: 1909
Location
- Location within Japan

Yatake Station (矢岳駅, Yatake-eki) is a railway station on the Hisatsu Line in Hitoyoshi, Kumamoto, Japan, operated by Kyushu Railway Company (JR Kyushu). The station opened in 1909.

== Lines ==
Yatake Station is served by the Hisatsu Line.

== Adjacent stations ==
| ← | Service | → |
Hisatsu Line
| Okoba | Local | Masaki |

== Gallery ==
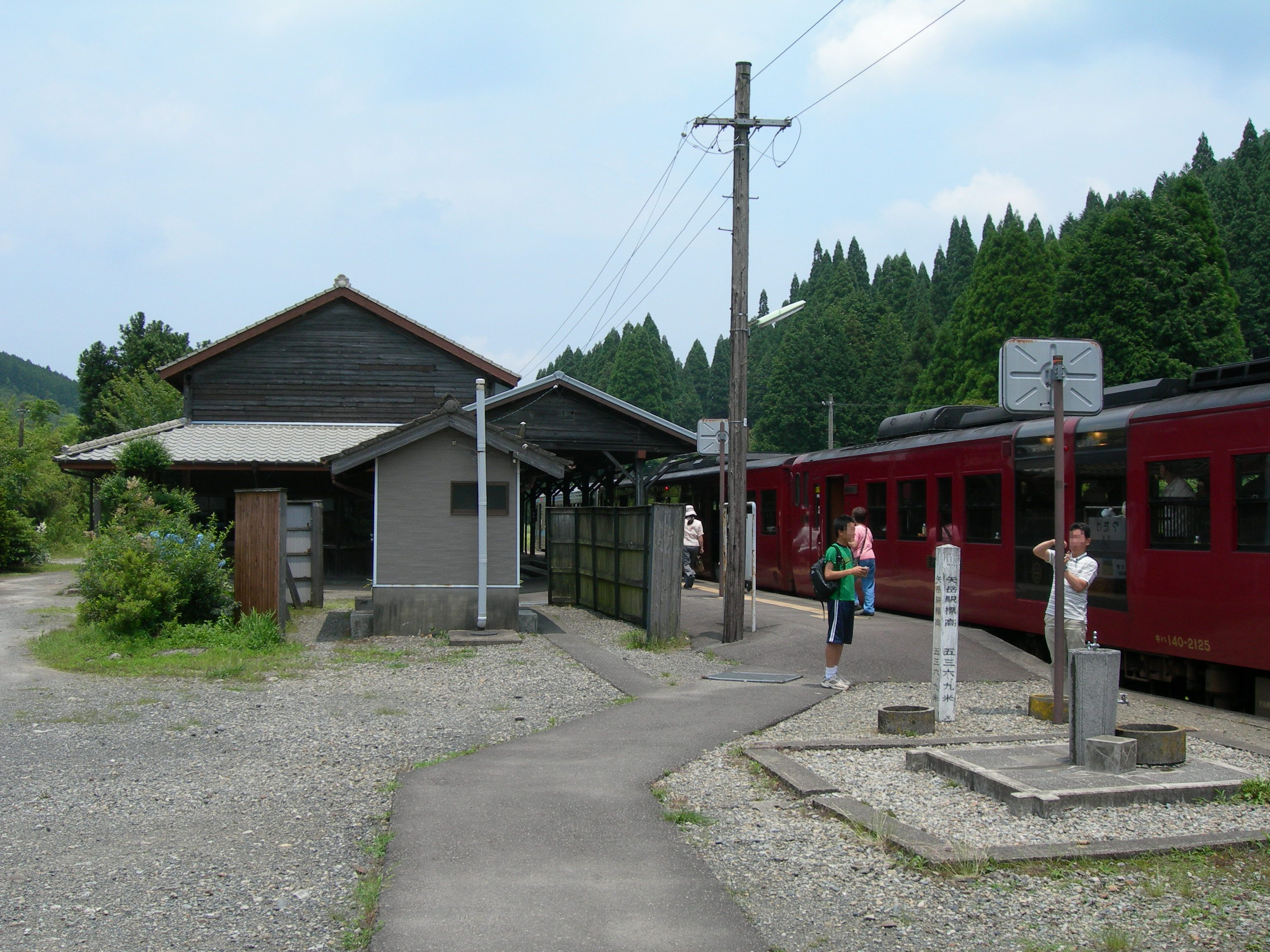
Platform

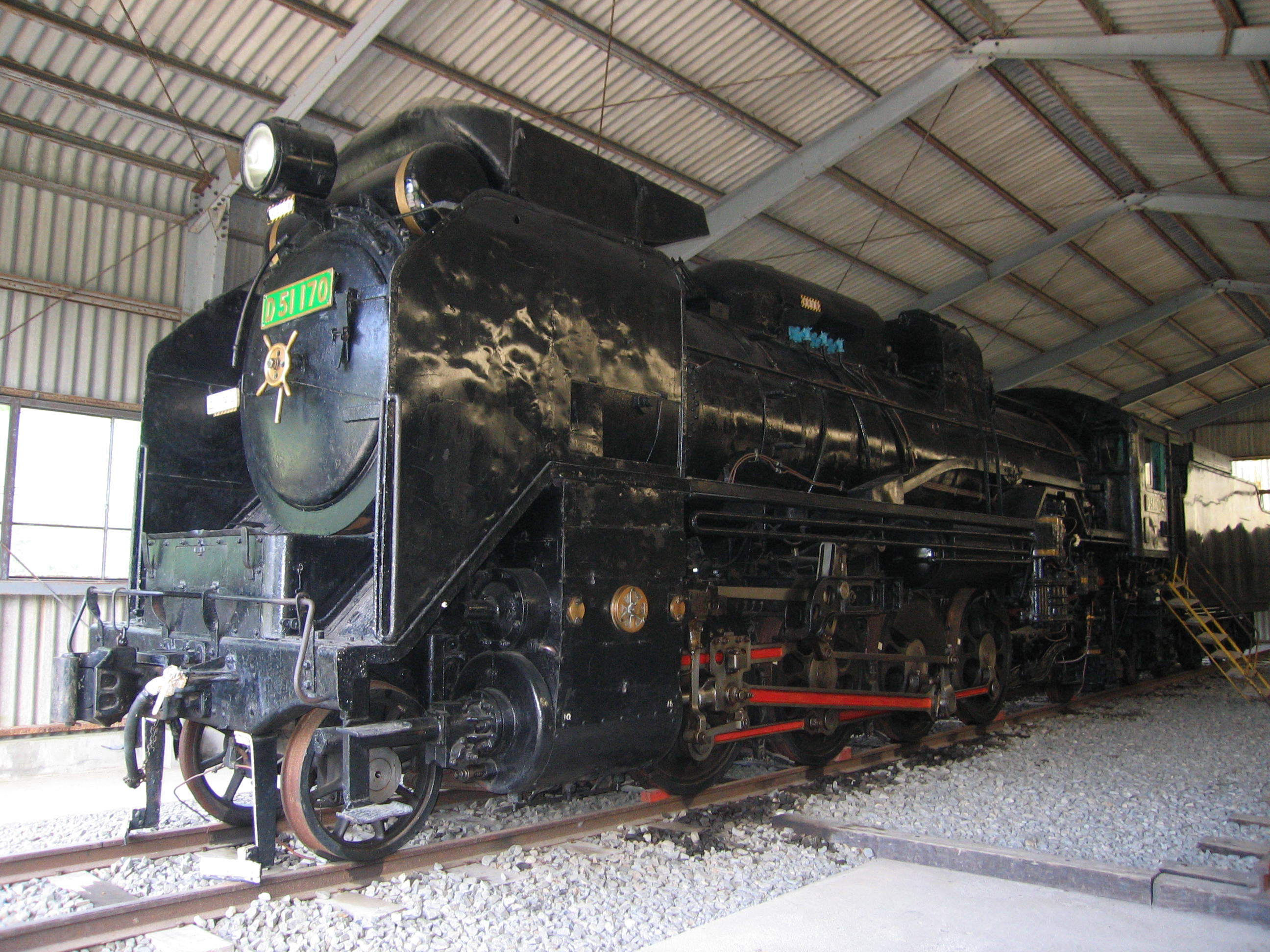
D51 170 steam locomotive

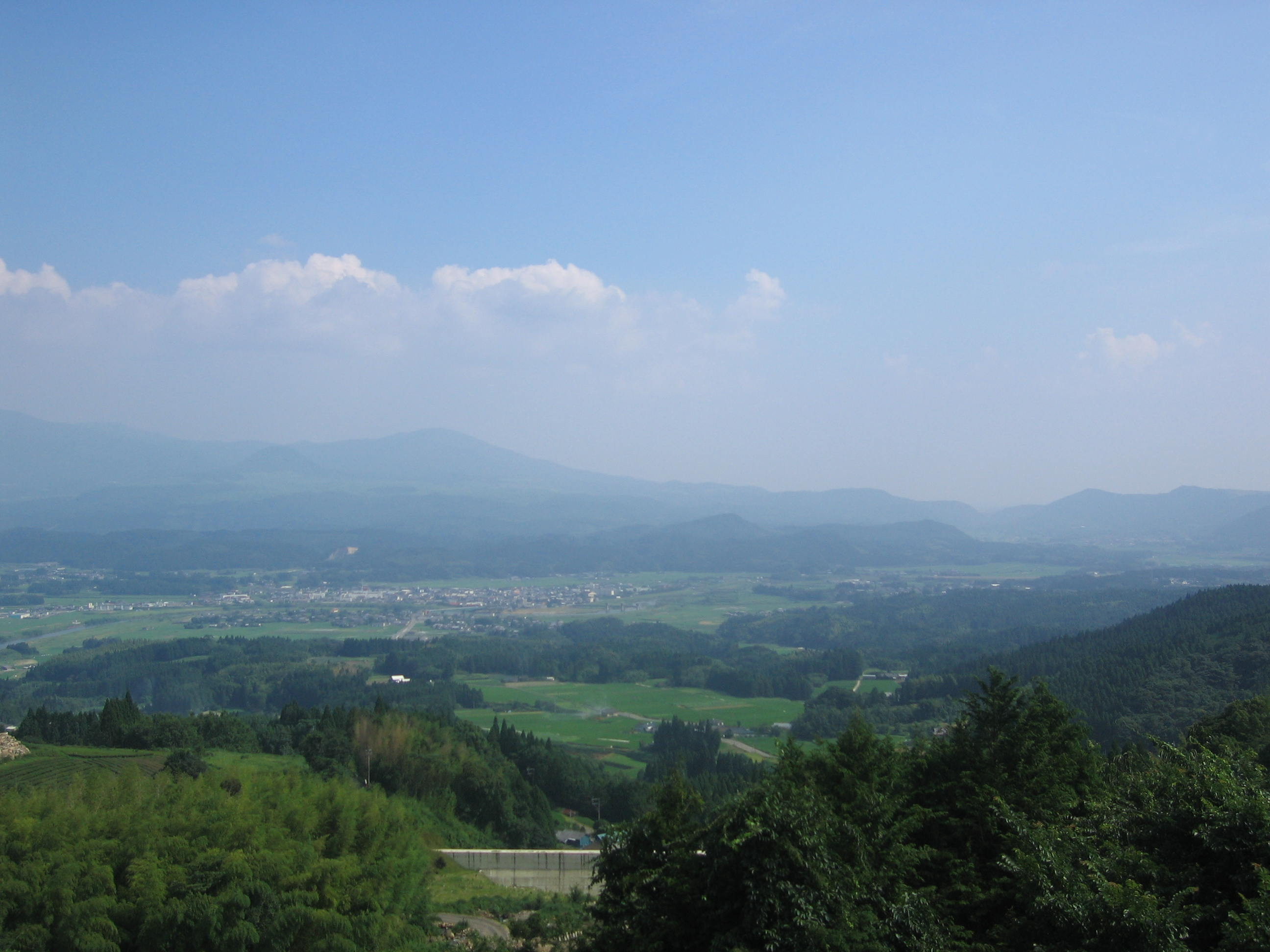
Yatake-goe, one of Japan's most beautiful views from the train on the Hisatsu Line

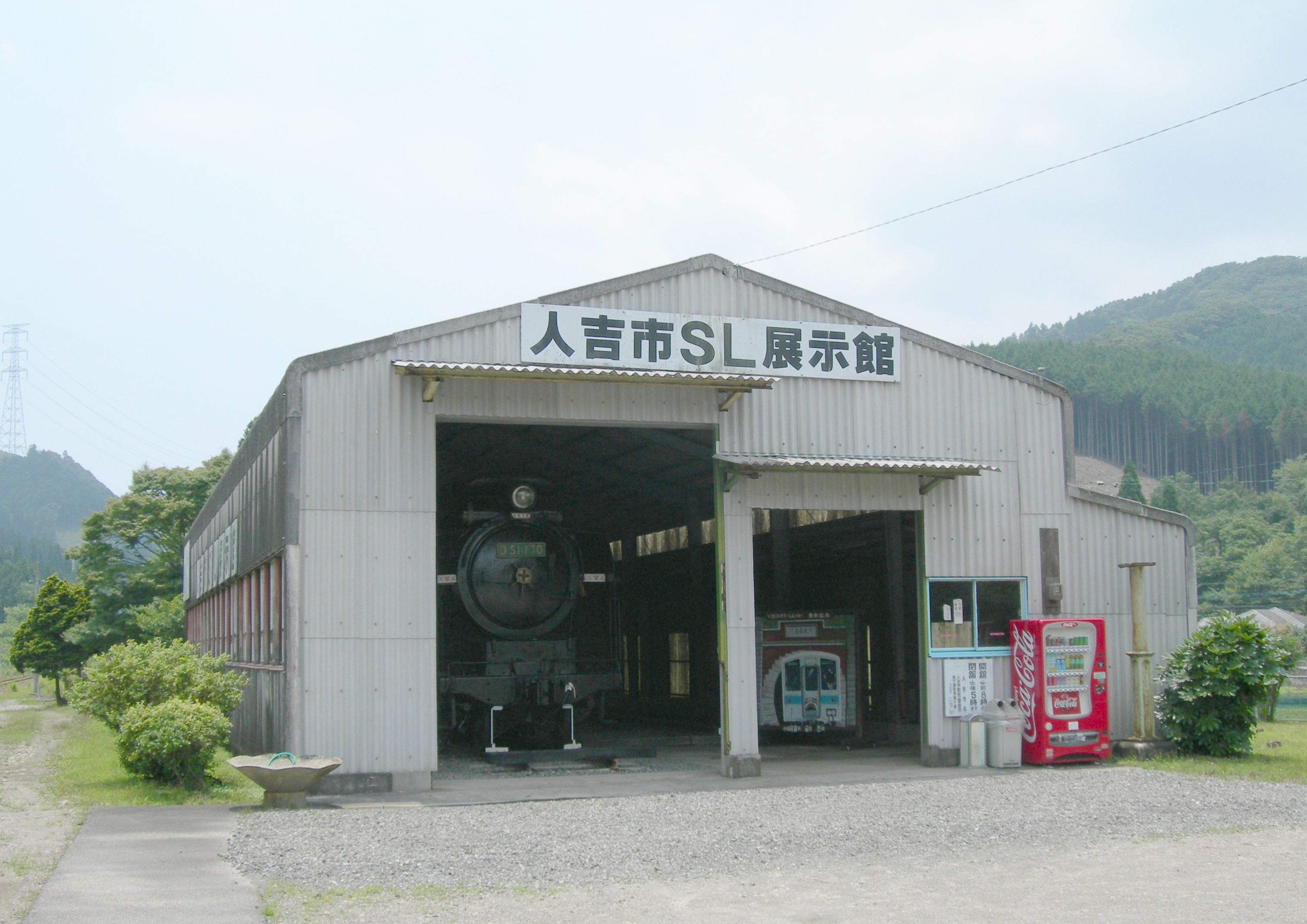
Hitoyoshi City SL (Steam Locomotive) Museum

== See also ==
- List of railway stations in Japan
