= Kirishima-Onsen Station =

Railway station in Kirishima, Kagoshima Prefecture, Japan

Kirishima-Onsen Station 霧島温泉駅
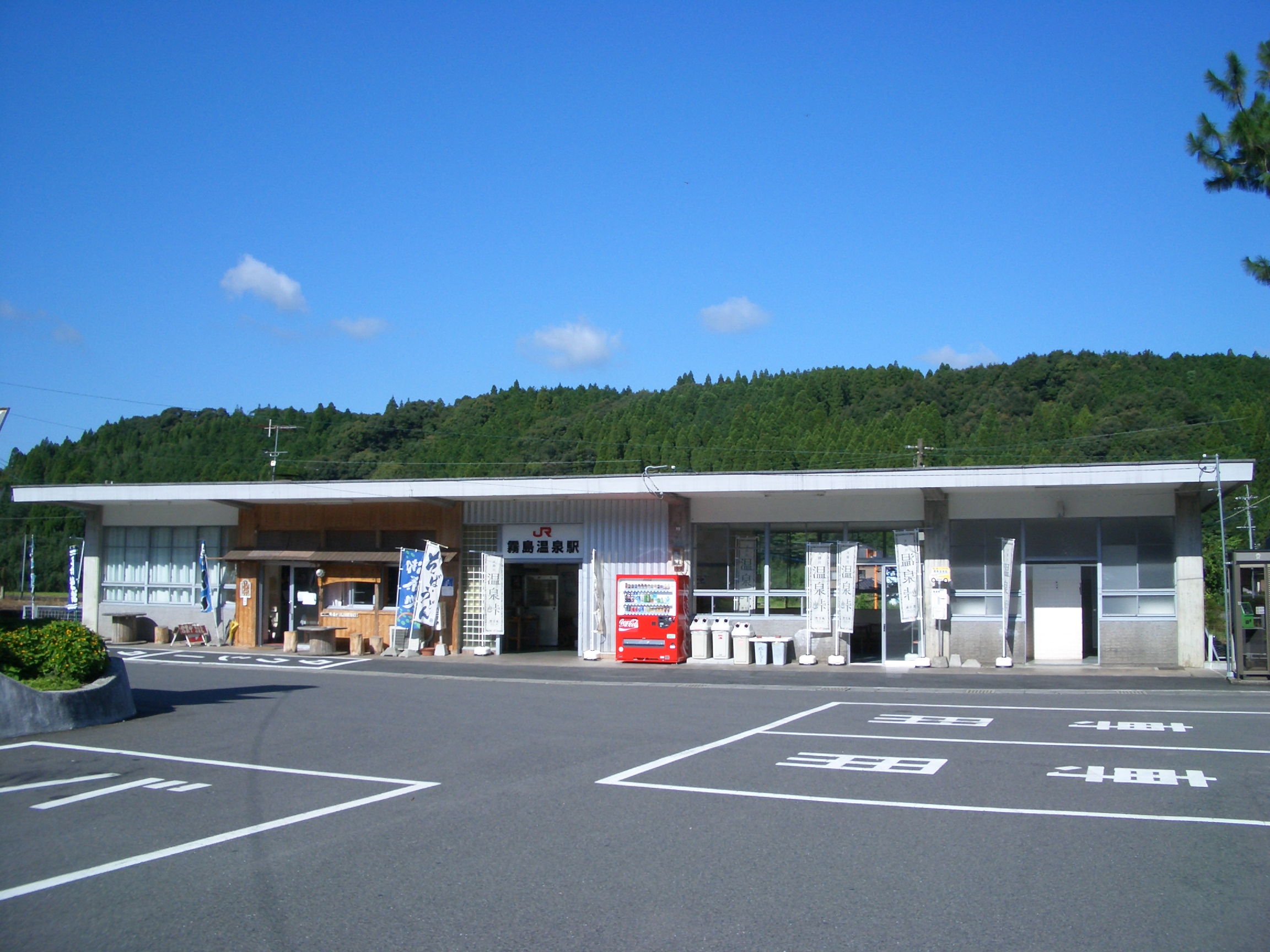
- Kirishima-Onsen Station in September 2007

General information
- Location: 169-3 Kubota, Makizono-cho, Kirishima-shi, Kagoshima-ken 899-6507; Japan
- Coordinates: 31°52′05″N 130°44′04″E
- Operator: JR Kyushu
- Line: Hisatsu Line
- Distance: 106.5 km from Yatsushiro
- Platforms: 1 island platform
- Tracks: 2

Construction
- Structure type: At grade

Other information
- Status: Unstaffed
- Website: Official website

History
- Opened: 11 July 1908; 118 years ago
- Former names: Makizono (to 1962); Kirishima-Nishiguchi (to 2003)

Passengers
- FY2016: 490

Services
Preceding station	JR Kyushu	Following station
Uemura towards Yatsushiro	Hisatsu Line	Kareigawa towards Hayato
Location
- Location within Kagoshima Prefecture Location within Japan

Kirishima-Onsen Station (霧島温泉駅, Kirishima-Onsen-eki) is a passenger railway station located in the city of Kirishima, Kagoshima, Japan. It is operated by of JR Kyushu and is on the Hisatsu Line.

== Lines ==
The station is served by the Hisatsu Line and is located 106.5 km from the starting point of the line at Yatsushiro.

== Layout ==
The station consists of one island platform connected to the concrete station building by a level crossing. The station is unattended.

=== Platforms ===
1	■ ■ Hisatsu Line	for Hayato and Kagoshima-Chūō
2	■ ■ Hisatsu Line	for Yoshimatsu

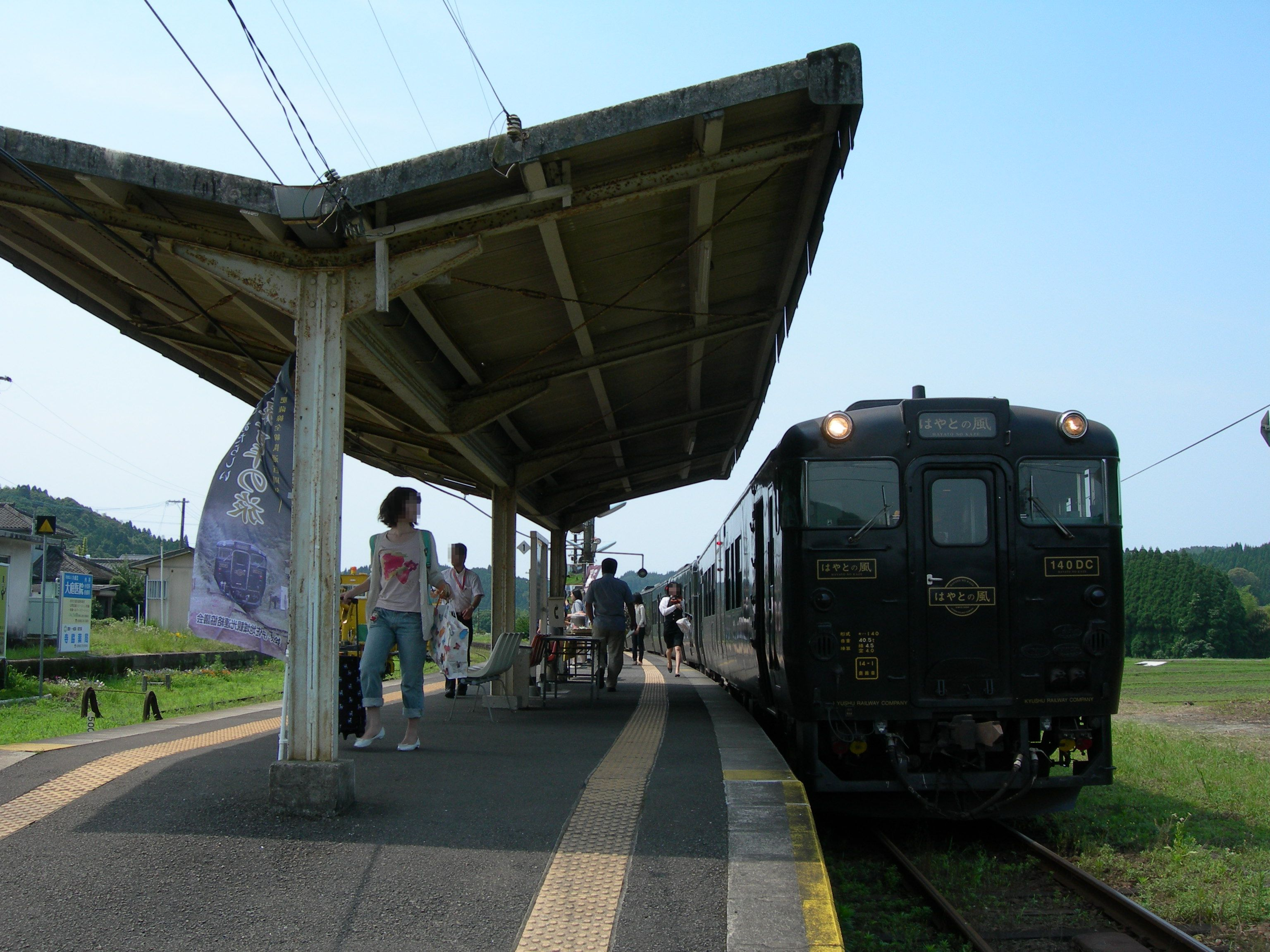
Platform, 2009

== History ==
The station began as Makizono Station (牧園駅), a freight-only station on the Kagoshima Main Line on 11 July 1908. It was promoted to a passenger station on 10 July 1909. The Yatsushiro-Yoshimatsu-Kagoshima portion of the Kagoshima Main Line was separated, becoming the Hisatsu Line on 17 October 1927. The station name was changed to Kirishima-Nishiguchi Station (霧島西口駅) on 15 January 1962 and freight operation were discontinued from September of the same year. With the privatization of Japanese National Railways (JNR), the successor of JGR, on 1 April 1987, the station came under the control of JR Kyushu. The station name was changed to its present name on 15 March 2003.

== Passenger statistics ==
In fiscal 2016, the station was used by an average of 490 passengers daily (boarding passengers only)

== Surrounding area ==
- Kagoshima Prefectural Road Route 50
- Kirishima Nishiguchi Post Office
- Kagoshima Prefectural Kirishima High School
- Makizono Nursery
- Kirishima Onsen

== See also ==
- List of railway stations in Japan
