= Hyōkiyama Station =

Railway station in Kirishima, Kagoshima Prefecture, Japan

Hyōkiyama Station 表木山駅
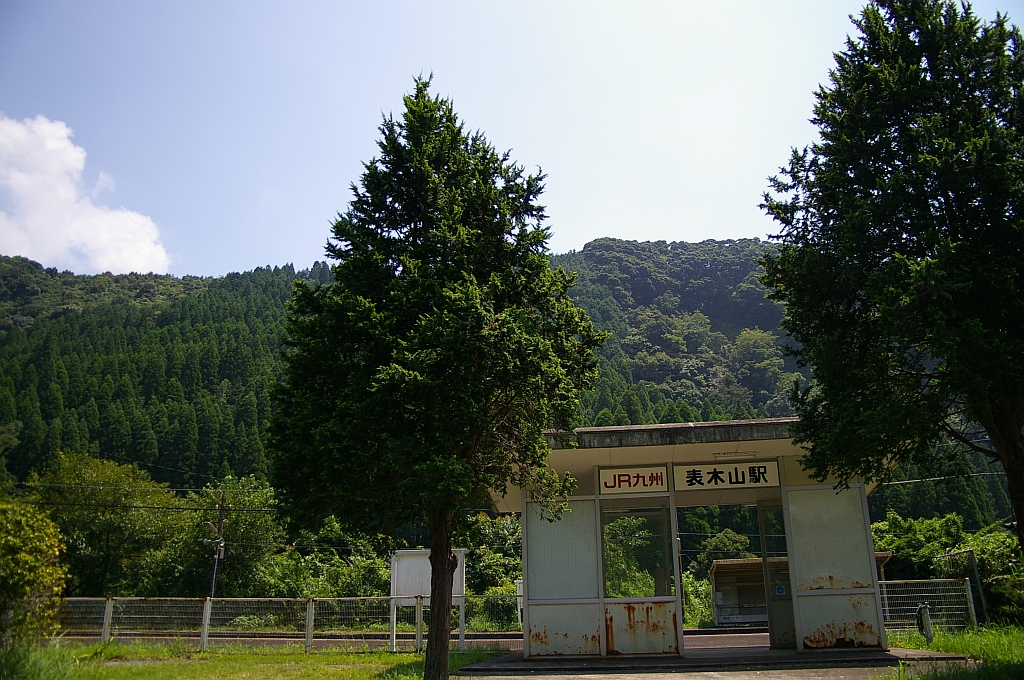
- Hyōkiyama Station in August 2006

General information
- Location: Hayatocho-Kareigawa-aza-Hyōkiyama, Kirishima-shi, Kagoshima-ken 899-5113; Japan
- Coordinates: 31°47′47″N 130°44′42″E
- Operator: JR Kyushu
- Line: ■ Hisatsu Line
- Distance: 116.8 kilometres (72.6 mi) from Yatsushiro
- Platforms: 2 side platforms

Other information
- Status: Unstaffed
- Website: Official website

History
- Opened: 11 October 1920

Passengers
- FY2016: 2

Services
Preceding station	JR Kyushu	Following station
Nakafukura towards Yatsushiro	Hisatsu Line	Hinatayama towards Hayato
Location
- Location within Kagoshima Prefecture Location within Japan

Hyōkiyama Station (表木山駅, Hyōkiyama-eki) is a passenger railway station located in the city of Kirishima, Kagoshima, Japan. It is operated by of JR Kyushu and is on the Hisatsu Line.

== Lines ==
The station is served by the Hisatsu Line and is located 116.8 km from the starting point of the line at Yatsushiro.

== Layout ==
The station consists of one side platform serving a single track. there is no station building, but only a shelter on the platform, and the station is unattended.

=== Platforms ===
1	■ ■ Hisatsu Line	for Yoshimatsu and Miyakonojō
2	■ ■ Hisatsu Line	for Hayato and Kagoshima-Chūō

== History ==
The station began as a Hyōkiyama Signal Stop which opened on the Kagoshima Main Line on 11 September 1916. It was promoted to a full station on 11 October 1920. The Yatsushiro-Yoshimatsu-Kagoshima portion of the Kagoshima Main Line was separated, becoming the Hisatsu Line on 17 October 1927. With the privatization of Japanese National Railways (JNR), the successor of JGR, on 1 April 1987, the station came under the control of JR Kyushu.

== Passenger statistics ==
In fiscal 2016, the station was used by an average of 2 passengers daily (boarding passengers only).

== Surrounding area ==
- Kagoshima Prefectural Road Route 477
- Myōken Onsen
- Amori River
- Shinkawa Electric Power Station
- National Route 223

== See also ==
- List of railway stations in Japan
