= Nakafukura Station =

Railway station in Kirishima, Kagoshima Prefecture, Japan

Nakafukura Station 中福良駅
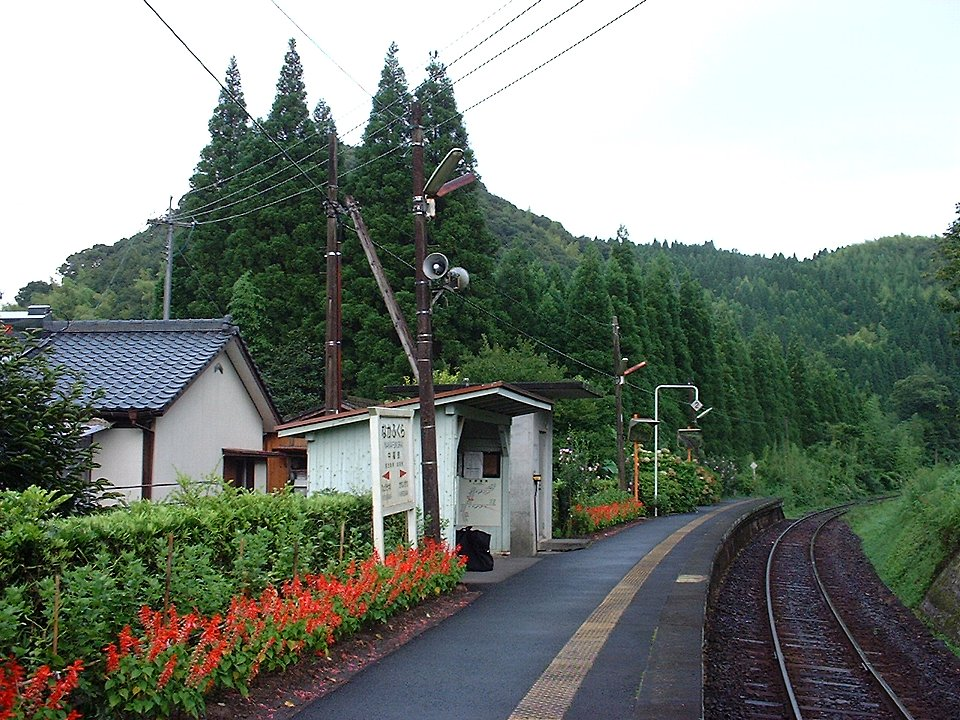
- Nakafukura Station in August 2003

General information
- Location: 3881 Kareigawa, Hayato-cho, Kirishima-shi, Kagoshima-ken 899-5113; Japan
- Coordinates: 31°48′50″N 130°43′58″E
- Operator: JR Kyushu
- Line: Hisatsu Line
- Distance: 114.4 kilometres (71.1 mi) from Yatsushiro
- Platforms: 1 side platform
- Tracks: 1

Construction
- Structure type: At grade

Other information
- Status: Unstaffed
- Website: Official website

History
- Opened: 1 February 1958; 68 years ago

Passengers
- 2016: 5 daily

Services
Preceding station	JR Kyushu	Following station
Kareigawa towards Yatsushiro	Hisatsu Line	Hyōkiyama towards Hayato
Location
- Location within Kagoshima Prefecture Location within Japan

Nakafukura Station (中福良駅, Nakafukura-eki) is a passenger railway station located in the Hayato neighborhood of the city of Kirishima, Kagoshima, Japan. It is operated by of JR Kyushu and is on the Hisatsu Line.

== Lines ==
Nakafukura Station is served by the Hisatsu Line and is located 114.4 kilometres (71.1 mi) from the starting point of the line at Yatsushiro.

== Layout ==
The station has a single side platform serving one bi-directional track. There is no station building, but only a shelter on the platform. The station is unattended.

== History ==
The station was opened on 1 February 1958. With the privatization of Japanese National Railways (JNR), the successor of JGR, on 1 April 1987, the station came under the control of JR Kyushu.

== Passenger statistics ==
In fiscal 2016, the station was used by an average of 5 passengers daily (boarding passengers only).

== Surrounding area ==
- Kagoshima Prefectural Road Route 477
- Kirishima City Nakafukura Elementary School
- Nakafukura Community Center

== See also ==
- List of railway stations in Japan
