= Uemura Station =

Railway station in Kirishima, Kagoshima Prefecture, Japan

Uemura Station 植村駅
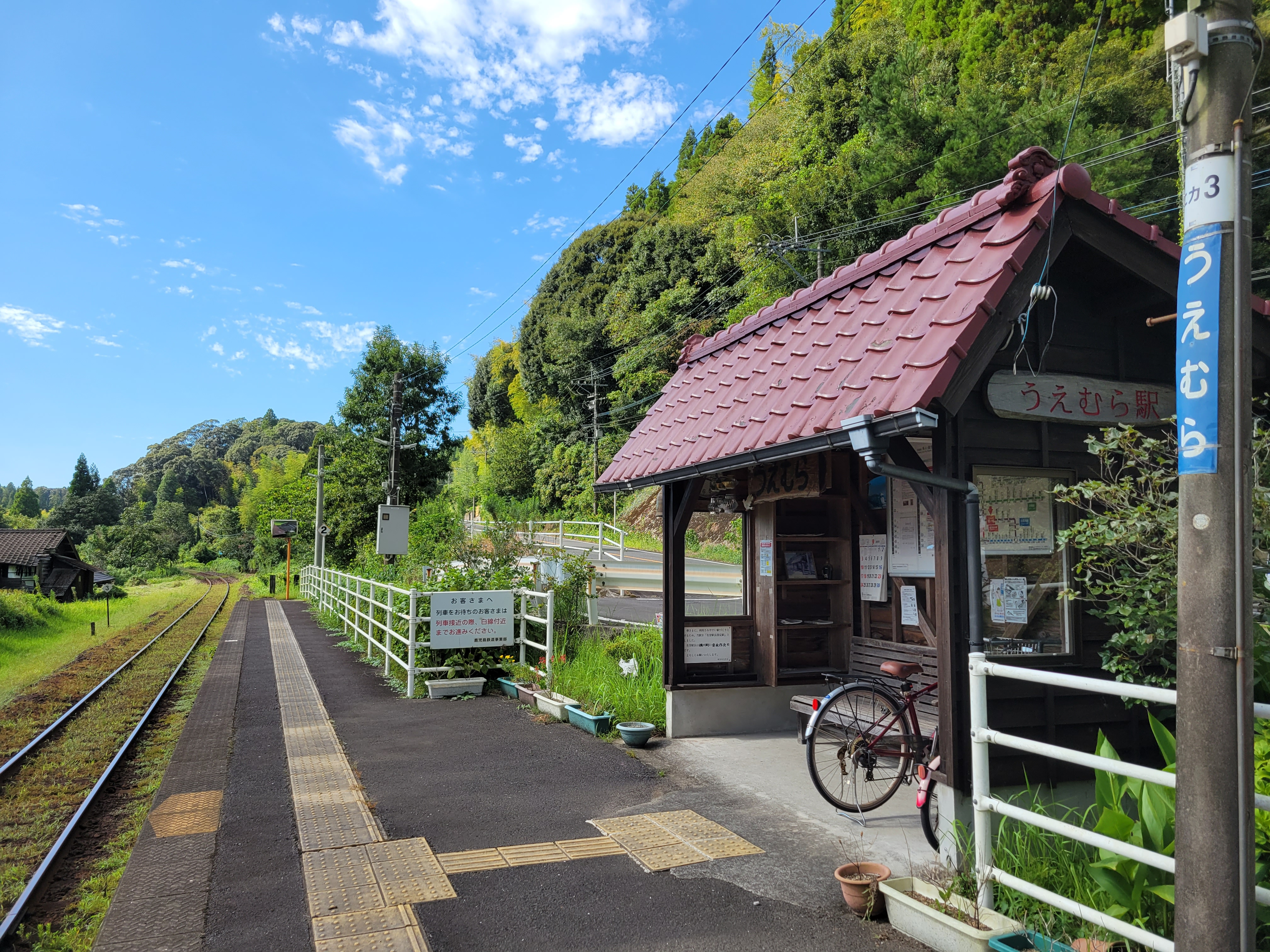
- Uemura Station in 2023

General information
- Location: 3181 Yokogawacho-Naka, Kirishima-shi, Kagoshima-ken899-6303; Japan
- Coordinates: 31°53′24″N 130°43′27″E
- Operator: JR Kyushu
- Line: ■ Hisatsu Line
- Distance: 102.8 km from Yatsushiro
- Platforms: 1 side platform

Other information
- Status: Unstaffed
- Website: Official website

History
- Opened: 5 July 1957

Passengers
- FY2016: 11

Services
Preceding station	JR Kyushu	Following station
Ōsumi-Yokogawa towards Yatsushiro	Hisatsu Line	Kirishima-Onsen towards Hayato
Location
- Location within Kagoshima Prefecture Location within Japan

Uemura Station (植村駅, Uemura-eki) is a passenger railway station located in the city of Kirishima, Kagoshima, Japan. It is operated by of JR Kyushu and is on the Hisatsu Line.

== Lines ==
The station is served by the Hisatsu Line and is located 102.8 km from the starting point of the line at Yatsushiro.

== Layout ==
The station consists of one side platform serving a single track. there is no station building, but only a shelter on the platform, and the station is unattended.

== History ==
The station was opened on 5 July 1957. With the privatization of Japanese National Railways (JNR), the successor of JGR, on 1 April 1987, the station came under the control of JR Kyushu.

== Passenger statistics ==
In fiscal 2016, the station was used by an average of 11 passengers daily (boarding passengers only).

== Surrounding area ==
- Kagoshima Prefectural Road Route 50
- Amori River
- Yokogawa Onsen

== See also ==
- List of railway stations in Japan
