= Hayato no Kaze =

Japanese limited express train service

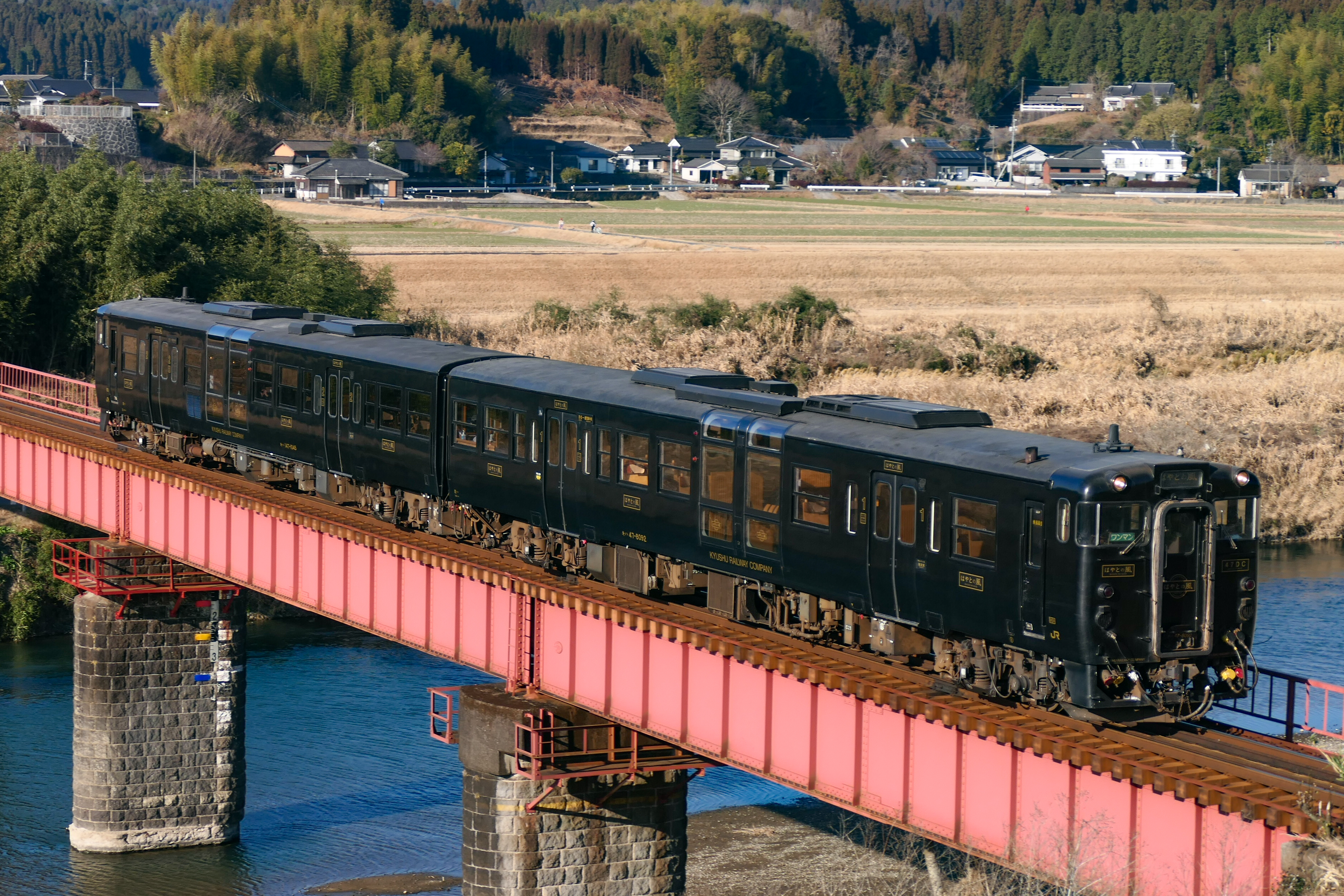
- 2-car Hayato no Kaze formation, January 2022

Overview
- Service type: Limited express
- Locale: Kagoshima Main Line, Nippō Main Line, Hisatsu Line
- First service: 13 March 2004
- Last service: 21 March 2022 (18 years, 8 days)
- Current operator(s): JR Kyushu

Route
- Termini: Kagoshima-Chūō; Yoshimatsu
- Service frequency: 2 return trips daily

Technical
- Rolling stock: KiHa 47/147 DMUs
- Track gauge: 1,067 mm (3 ft 6 in)
- Electrification: Diesel
- Operating speed: 95 km/h (59 mph)

The Hayato no Kaze (Japanese: はやとの風, lit. 'Hayato's Wind') was a limited express service in Japan which ran between Kagoshima-Chūō Station and Yoshimatsu Station via the Kagoshima Main Line, Nippō Main Line, and Hisatsu Line. It was operated by Kyushu Railway Company (JR Kyushu). Its final run was on 21 March 2022.

== Schedule ==
There were two return services per day. All trains stopped at both Osumi-Yokogawa and Kareigawa Stations for about 5 minutes. Some trains stopped at Ryugamizu Station for about 4 minutes for a view of Sakurajima. (Passengers could not alight Ryugamizu Station.)

== Rolling stock ==
The train was formed of two specially converted diesel multiple unit (DMU) cars, KiHa 147-1045 and KiHa 47-8092. Initially, the train consisted of KiHa 147-1045 as reserved seating car 1 and KiHa 140-2066 as non-reserved seating car 2. From January 2006, a third car, KiHa 47-8092, was converted for use as reserved seating car 1, with KiHa 147-1045 as non-reserved seating car 2. KiHa 140-2066 was used as a spare car to make 3-car formations at busy periods, but was later rebuilt as a third car for use in the Ibusuki no Tamatebako DMU set, returning to service in March 2012.

KiHa 147-1045 and KiHa 140-2066 were converted at JR Kyushu's Kokura Works. KiHa 47-8092 was converted at JR Kyushu's Kagoshima Depot. The set is based at Kagoshima Depot.

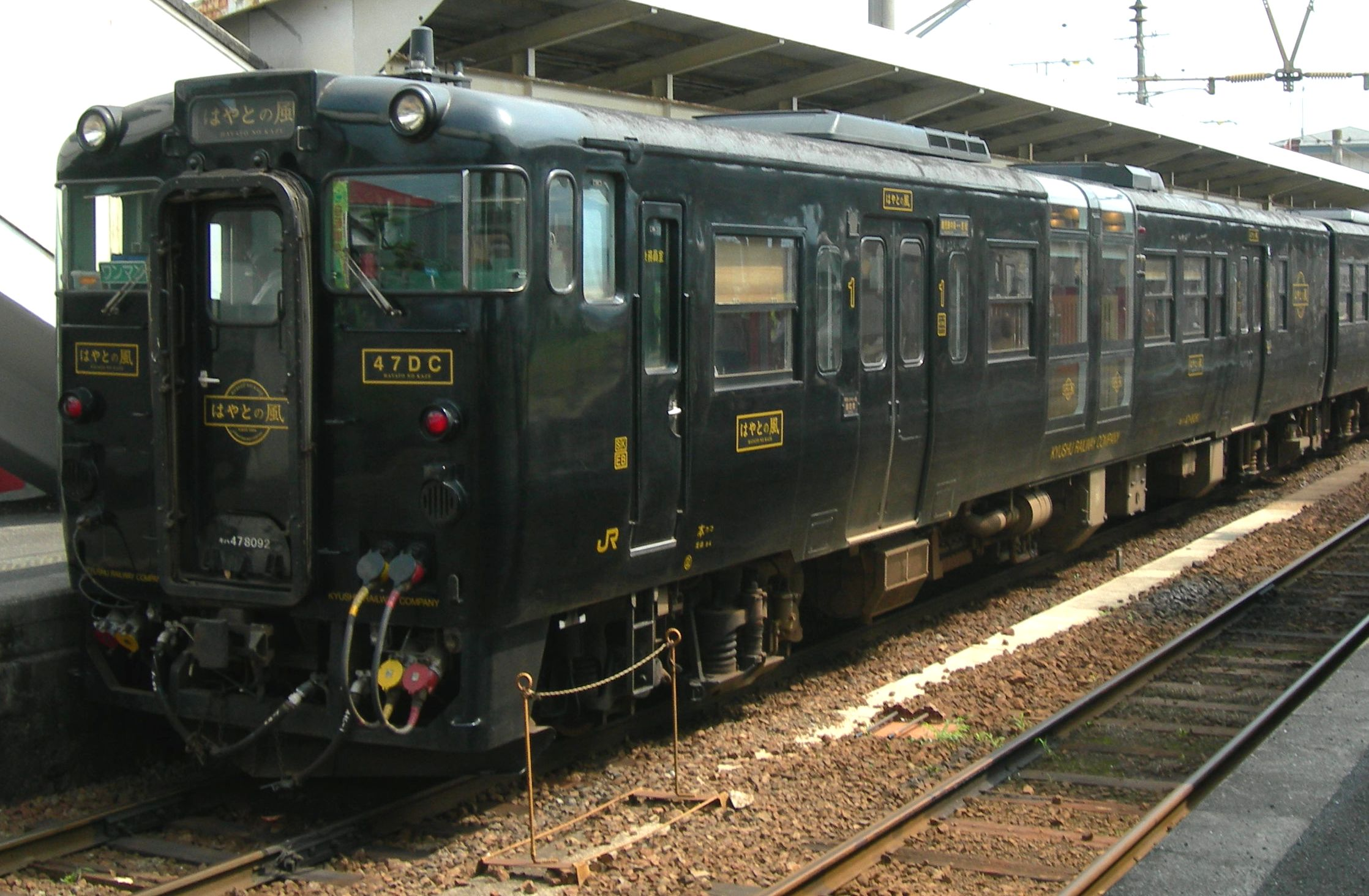
KiHa 47-8092

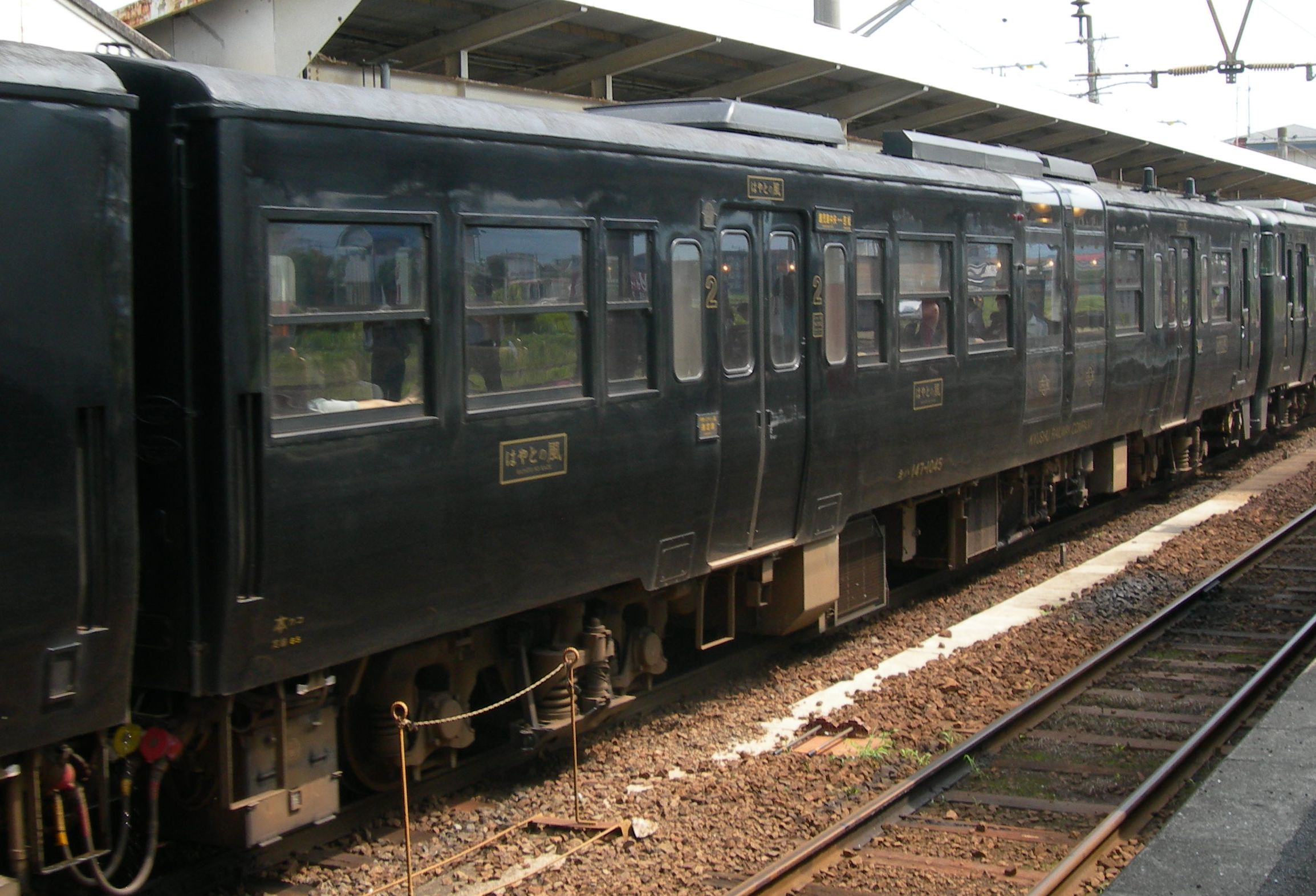
KiHa 147-1045

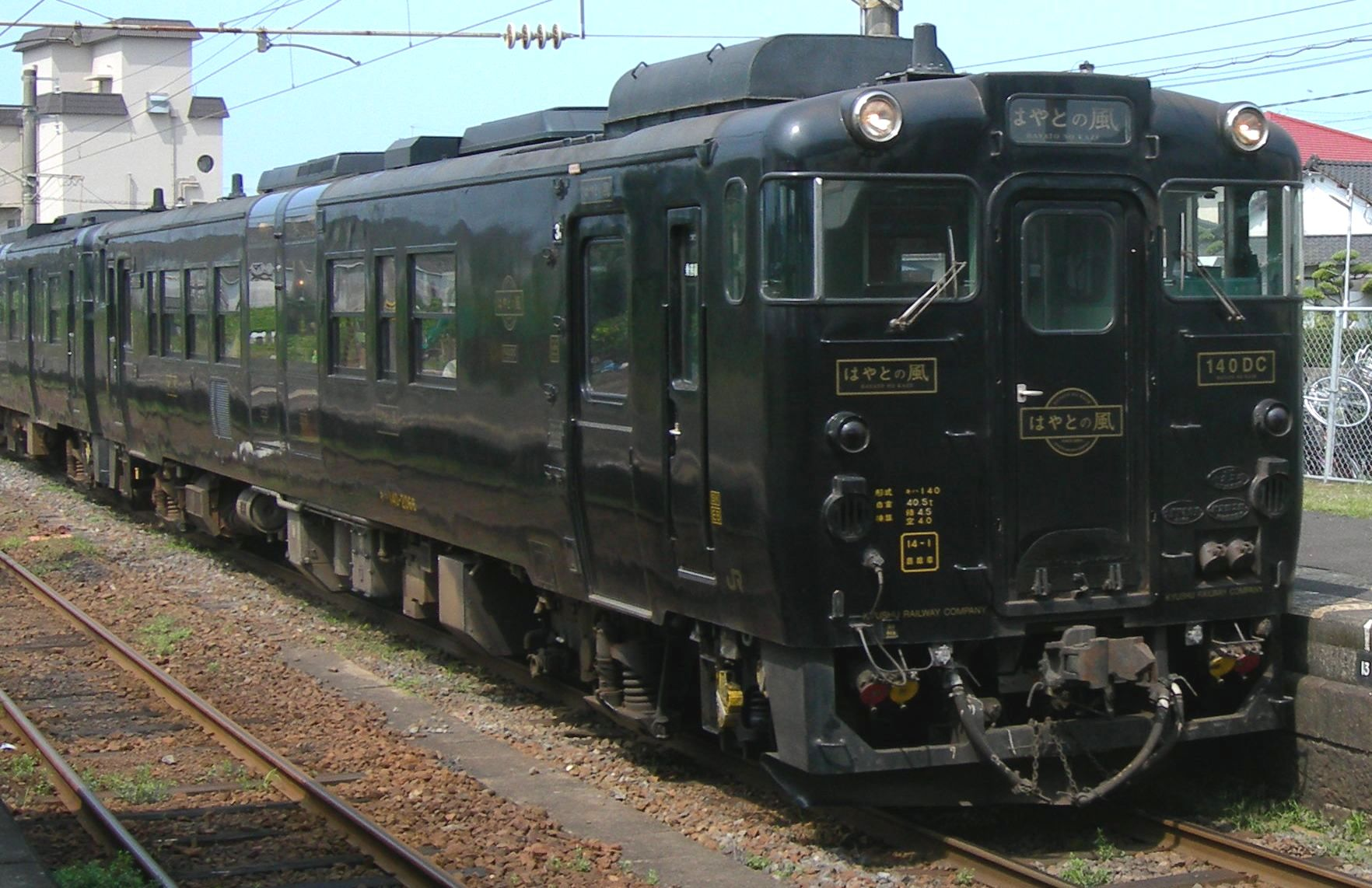
KiHa 140-2066

=== Exterior ===
The train was painted all-over black, with deep panorama side windows in the center of each car.

=== Interior ===
The trains featured totally new interiors finished in fire-resistant wood with reclining seats and improved air conditioning.

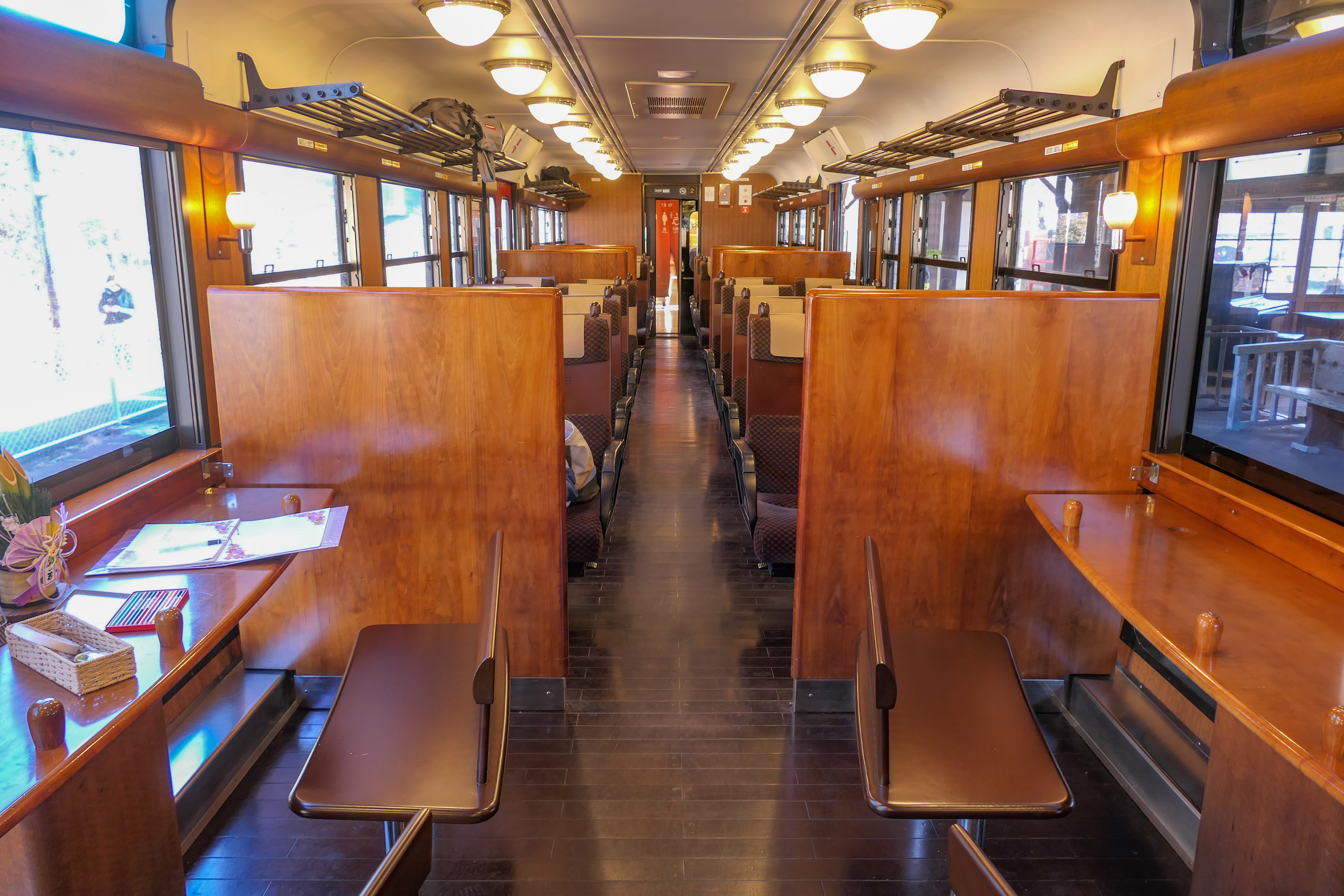
Interior of 147-1045

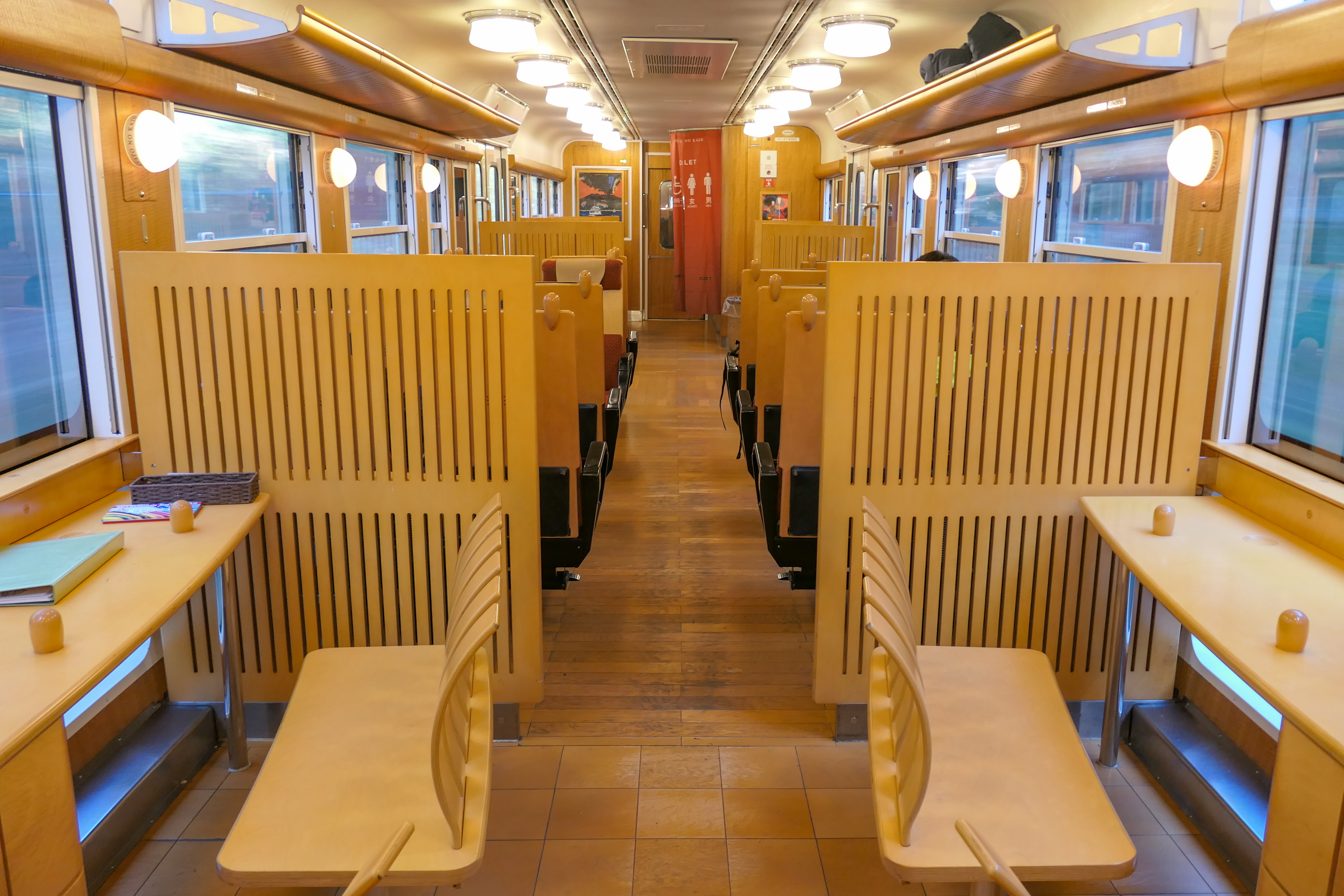
Interior of Kiha 47-8092

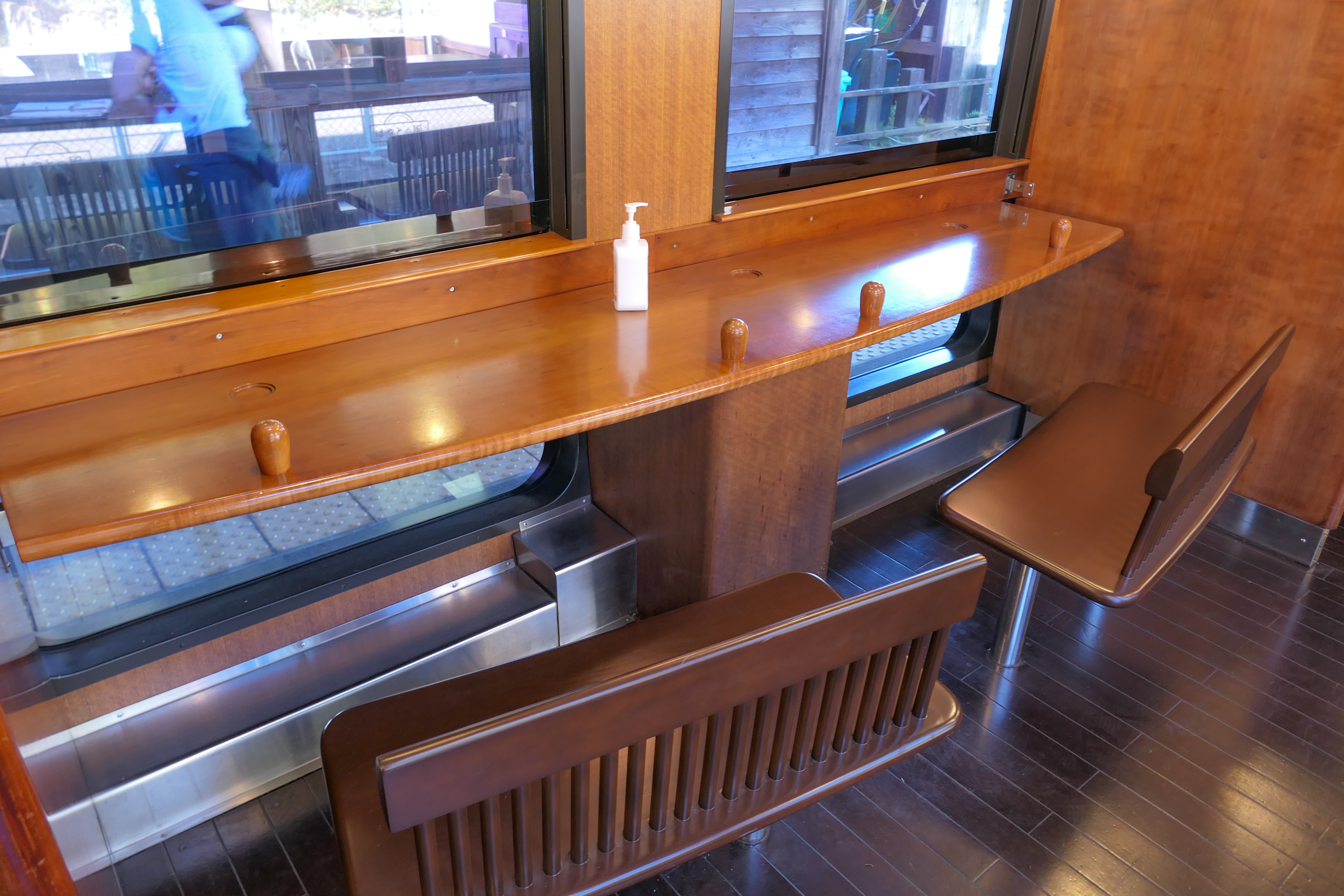
147-1045 observation seat counter table

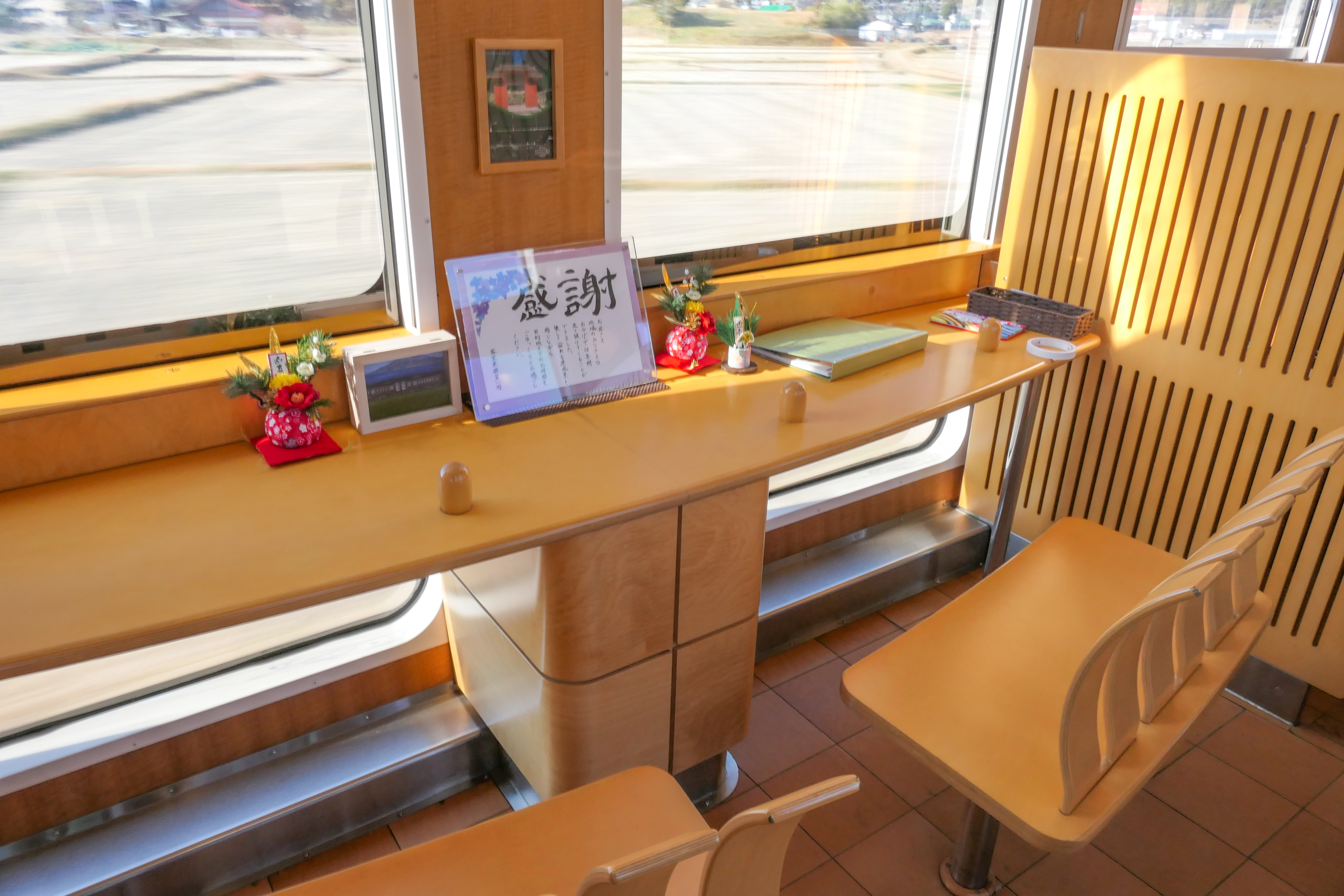
Kiha 47-8092 observation seat counter table

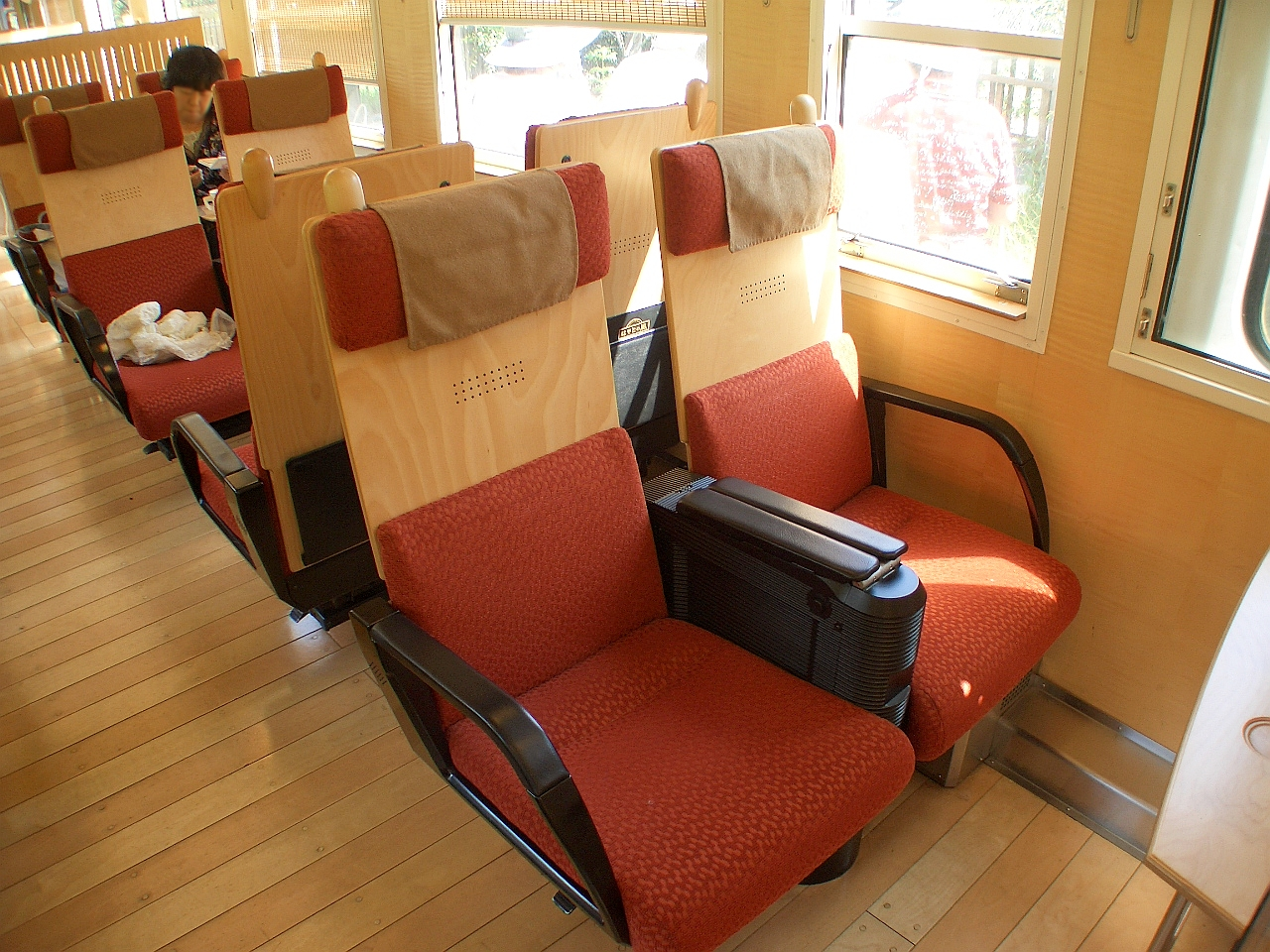
2+2 seating

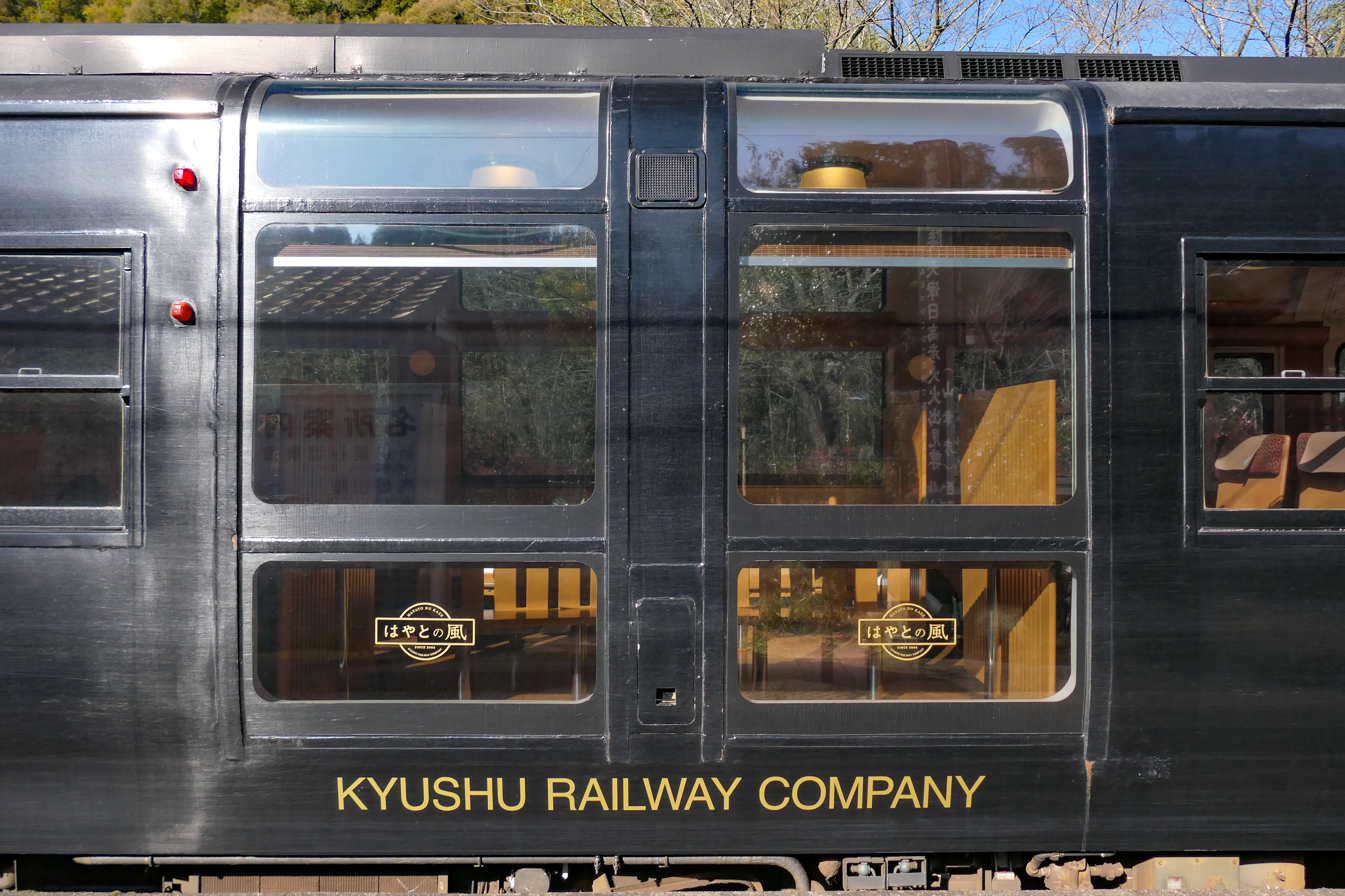
Enlarged observation window

== History ==
The Hayato no Kaze service was introduced on 13 March 2004, coinciding with the opening of the Kyushu Shinkansen. The train made its final run on 21 March 2022, and thereafter the cars will be refurbished into a new limited express service, the Two Stars 4047. The new Two Stars 4047 service is scheduled to begin in Fall 2022 and will run between Takeo Onsen and Nagasaki.

== See also ==
- Joyful Train
