= Hinatayama Station =

Railway station in Kirishima, Kagoshima Prefecture, Japan

Hinatayama Station 日当山駅
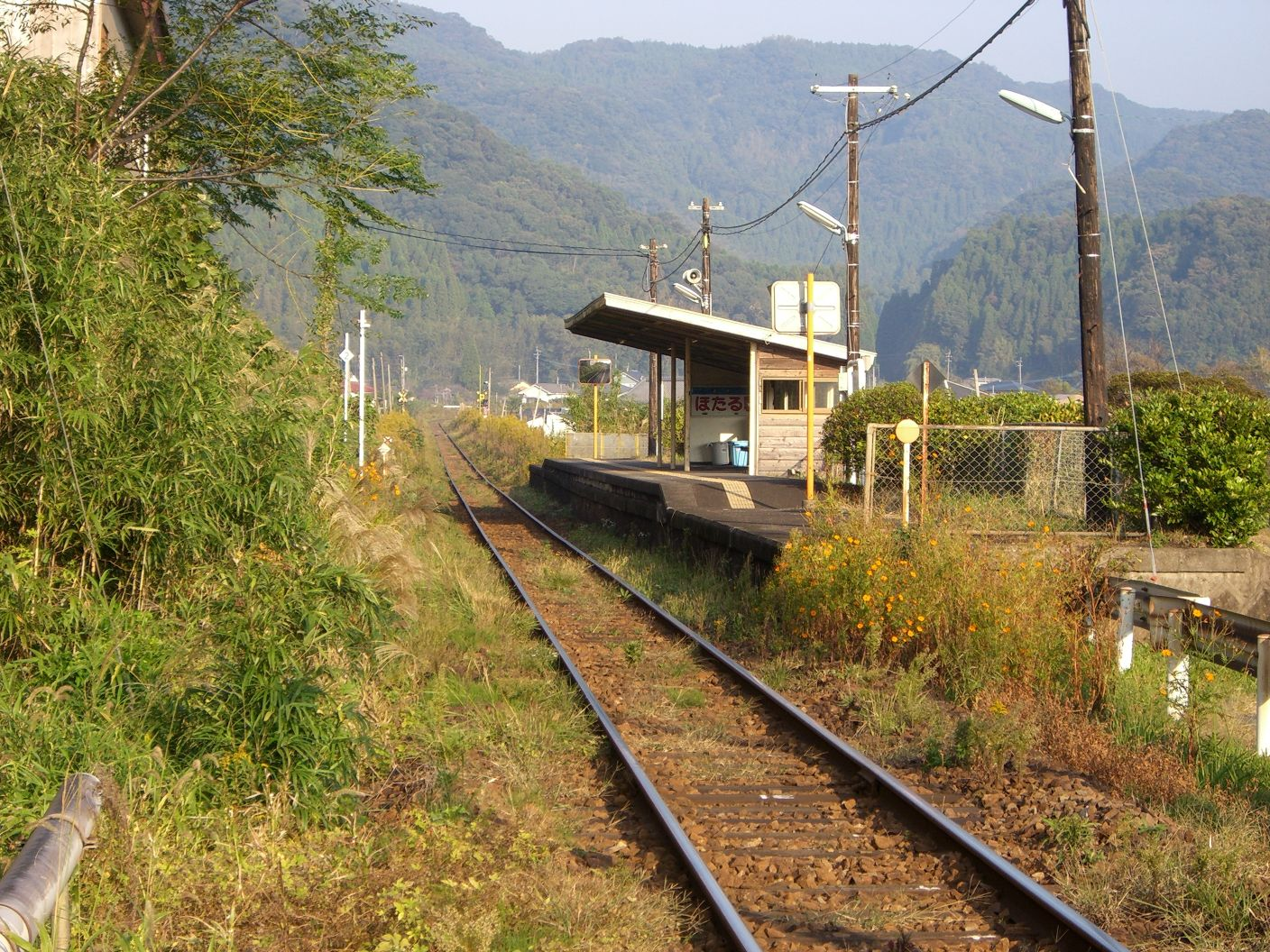
- Hinatayama Station in November 2006

General information
- Location: Hayatocho-Uchi, Kirishima-shi, Kagoshima-ken 899-5116; Japan
- Coordinates: 31°45′49″N 130°45′00″E
- Operator: JR Kyushu
- Line: ■ Hisatsu Line
- Distance: 121.6 kilometres (75.6 mi) from Yatsushiro
- Platforms: 1 side platform

Other information
- Status: Unstaffed
- Website: Official website

History
- Opened: 1 October 1958

Passengers
- FY2016: 159

Services
Preceding station	JR Kyushu	Following station
Hyōkiyama towards Yatsushiro	Hisatsu Line	Hayato Terminus
Location
- Location within Kagoshima Prefecture Location within Japan

Hinatayama Station (日当山駅, Hinatayama-eki) is a passenger railway station located in the city of Kirishima, Kagoshima, Japan. It is operated by of JR Kyushu and is on the Hisatsu Line.

== Lines ==
The station is served by the Hisatsu Line and is located 121.6 kilometres (75.6 mi) from the starting point of the line at Yatsushiro.

== Layout ==
The station consists of one side platform serving a single track. There is no station building, but only a shelter on the platform, and the station is unattended.

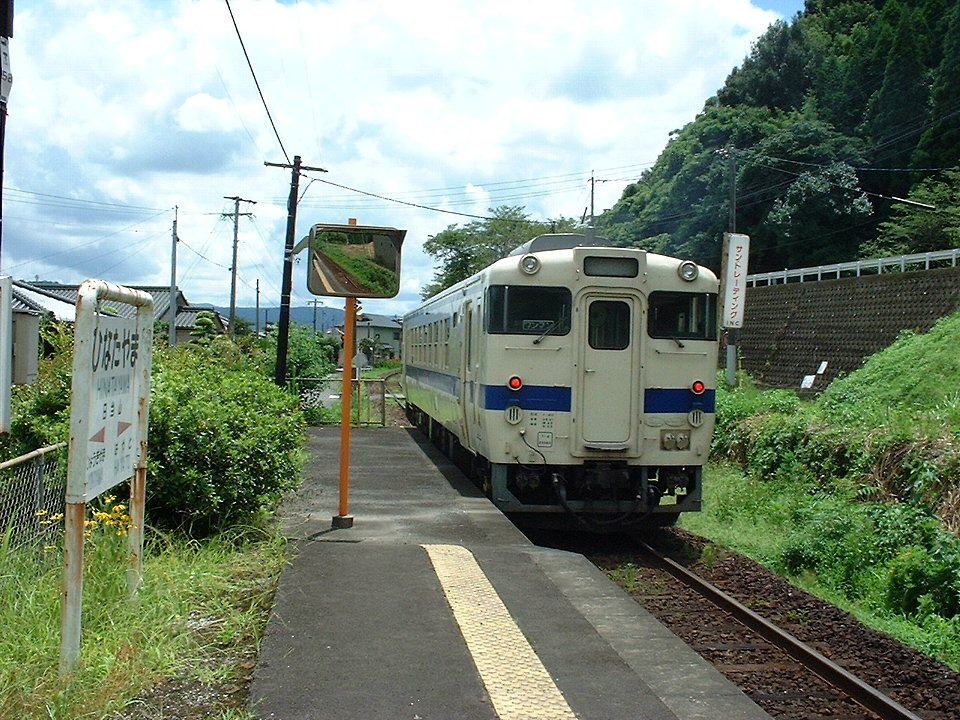
Platform

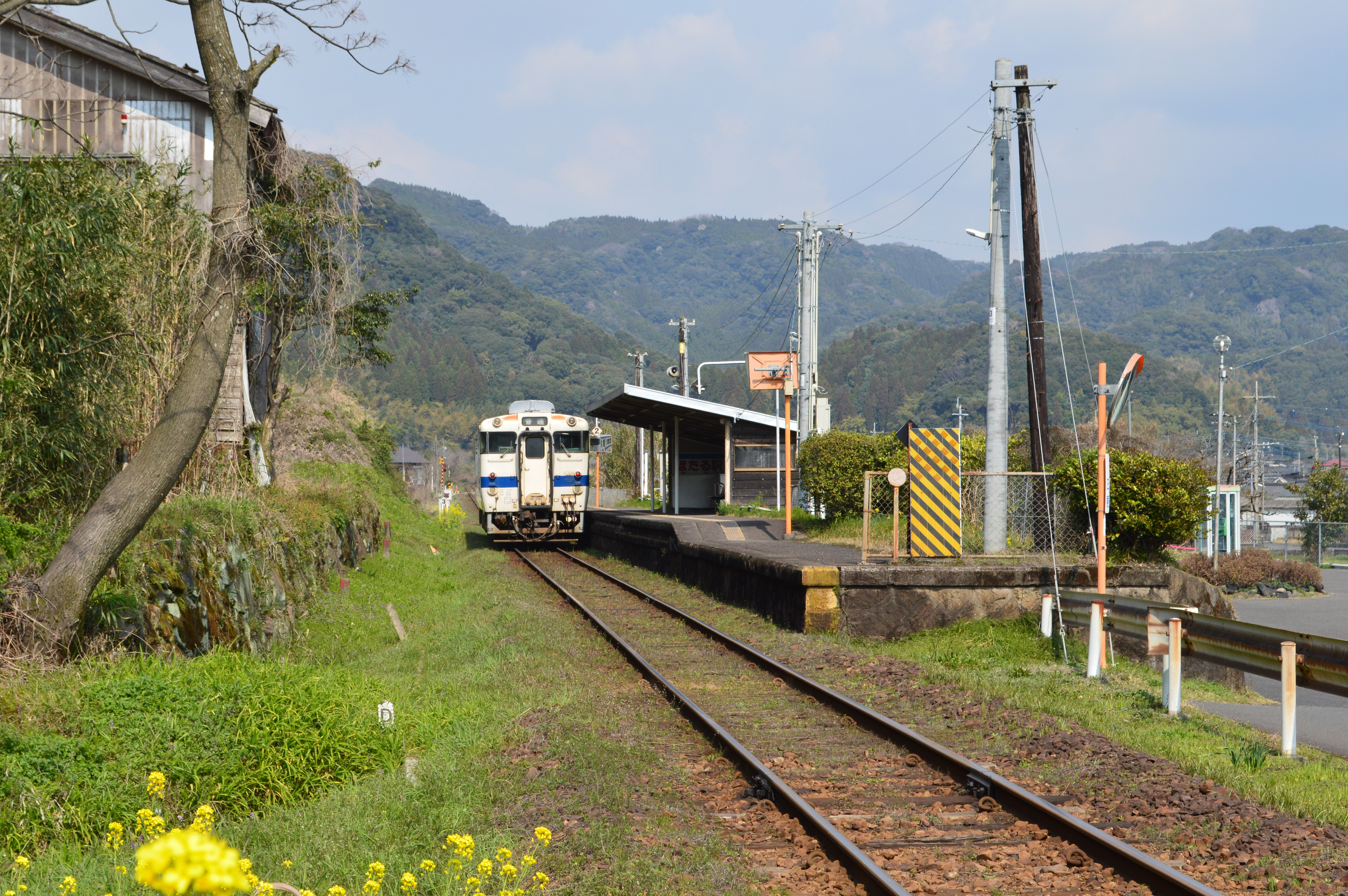
Platform

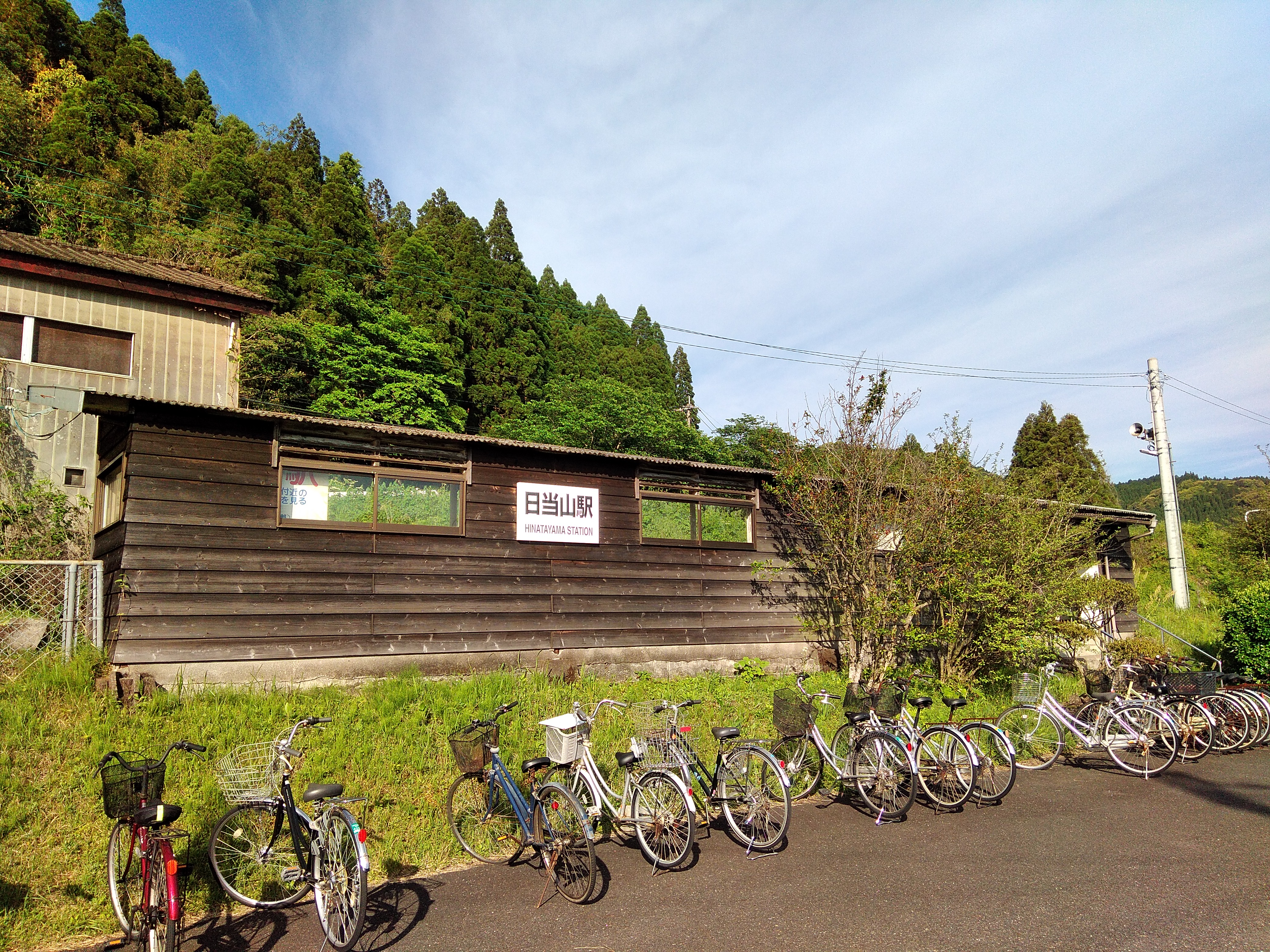
Shelter on Platform

== History ==
The station was opened on 1 October 1958. With the privatization of Japanese National Railways (JNR), the successor of JGR, on 1 April 1987, the station came under the control of JR Kyushu.

== Passenger statistics ==
In fiscal 2016, the station was used by an average of 159 passengers daily (boarding passengers only).

== Surrounding area ==
- National Route 223
- Hinatayama Post Office
- Hinatayama Onsen
- Yamanoyu Onsen

== See also ==
- List of railway stations in Japan
