= Kareigawa Station =

Railway station in Kirishima, Kagoshima Prefecture, Japan

Kareigawa Station 嘉例川駅
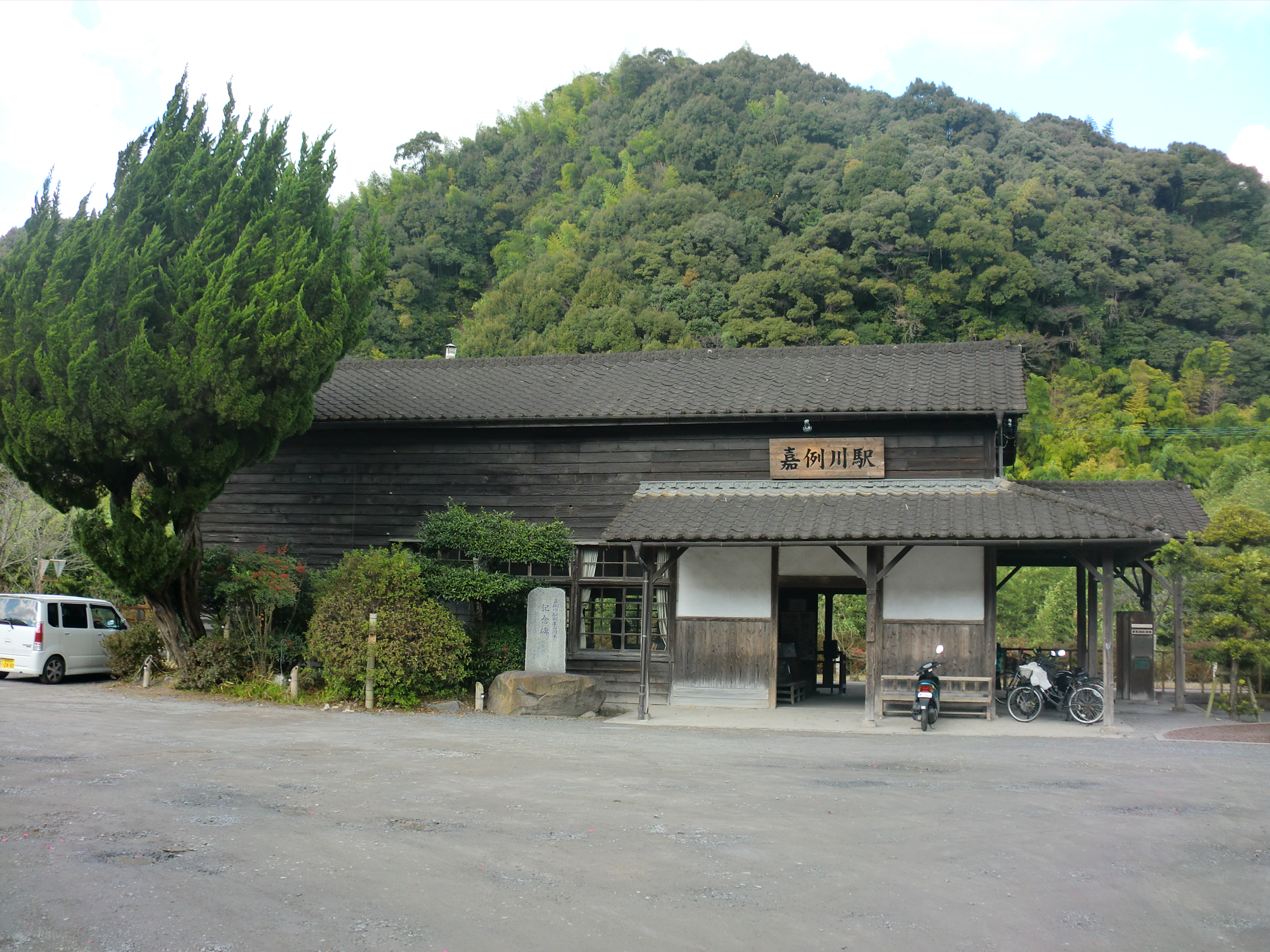
- Kareigawa Station in December 2012

General information
- Location: 2176 Kareigawa, Hayato-cho, Kirishima-shi, Kagoshima-ken 899-5113; Japan
- Coordinates: 31°49′36″N 130°43′22″E
- Operator: JR Kyushu
- Line: Hisatsu Line
- Distance: 112.3 km from Yatsushiro
- Platforms: 1 side platform
- Tracks: 1

Construction
- Structure type: At grade

Other information
- Status: Unstaffed
- Website: Official website

History
- Opened: 15 January 1903; 123 years ago

Passengers
- 2016: 73 daily

Services
Preceding station	JR Kyushu	Following station
Kirishima-Onsen towards Yatsushiro	Hisatsu Line	Nakafukura towards Hayato
Location
- Location within Kagoshima Prefecture Location within Japan

Kareigawa Station (嘉例川駅, Kareigawa-eki) is a passenger railway station located in the Hayato neighborhood of the city of Kirishima, Kagoshima, Japan. It is operated by of JR Kyushu and is on the Hisatsu Line.

== Lines ==
The station is served by the Hisatsu Line and is located 112.3 km from the starting point of the line at Yatsushiro.

== Layout ==
The station consists of one side platform serving a single track. An island platform that is no longer in use remains opposite the single platform. The plaza in front of the station is small and poses a safety problem for buses, so with the budget of Kagoshima Prefecture's "Attractive Tourist Destination Development Project" and the burden of Kirishima City, a parking area of approximately 1,550 square meters was constructed approximately 150 meters from the station. The station is unattended. The wooden station building dates from the opening of the station and is the oldest in the prefecture. It is presumed that it was constructed based on the drawings for fifth-class stations, the smallest of the standard design drawings for station buildings stipulated in the "Station Ruler" of the Railway Works Bureau of the Ministry of Communications in 1900. In 2004, the former Hayato Town acquired it for protection, and in 2006 it was designated as a National Registered Tangible Cultural Property, managed by the local government. Until 2022, it was one of the few unstaffed stations in the country to have a limited express train stop.

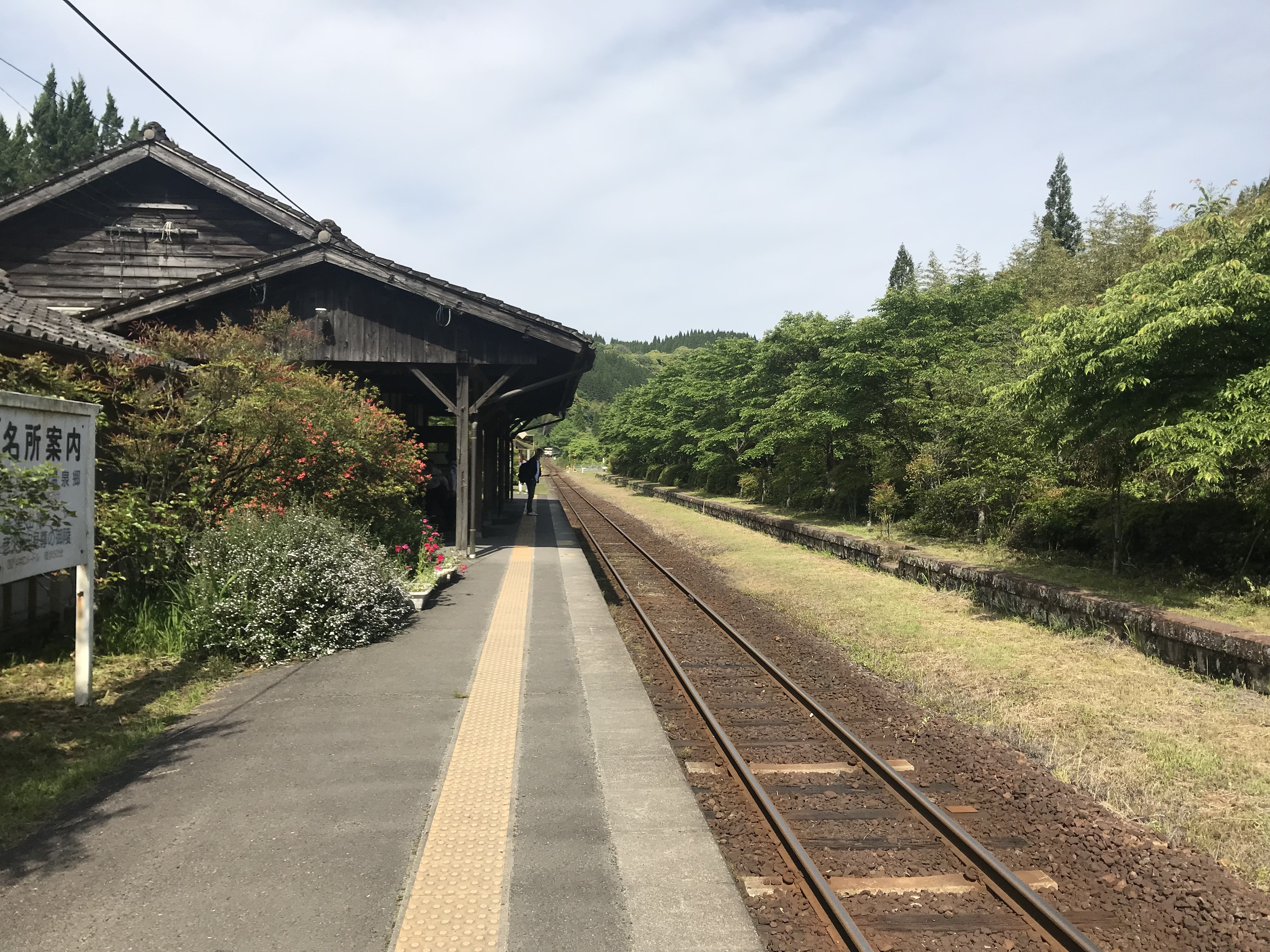
Platform, May 2018

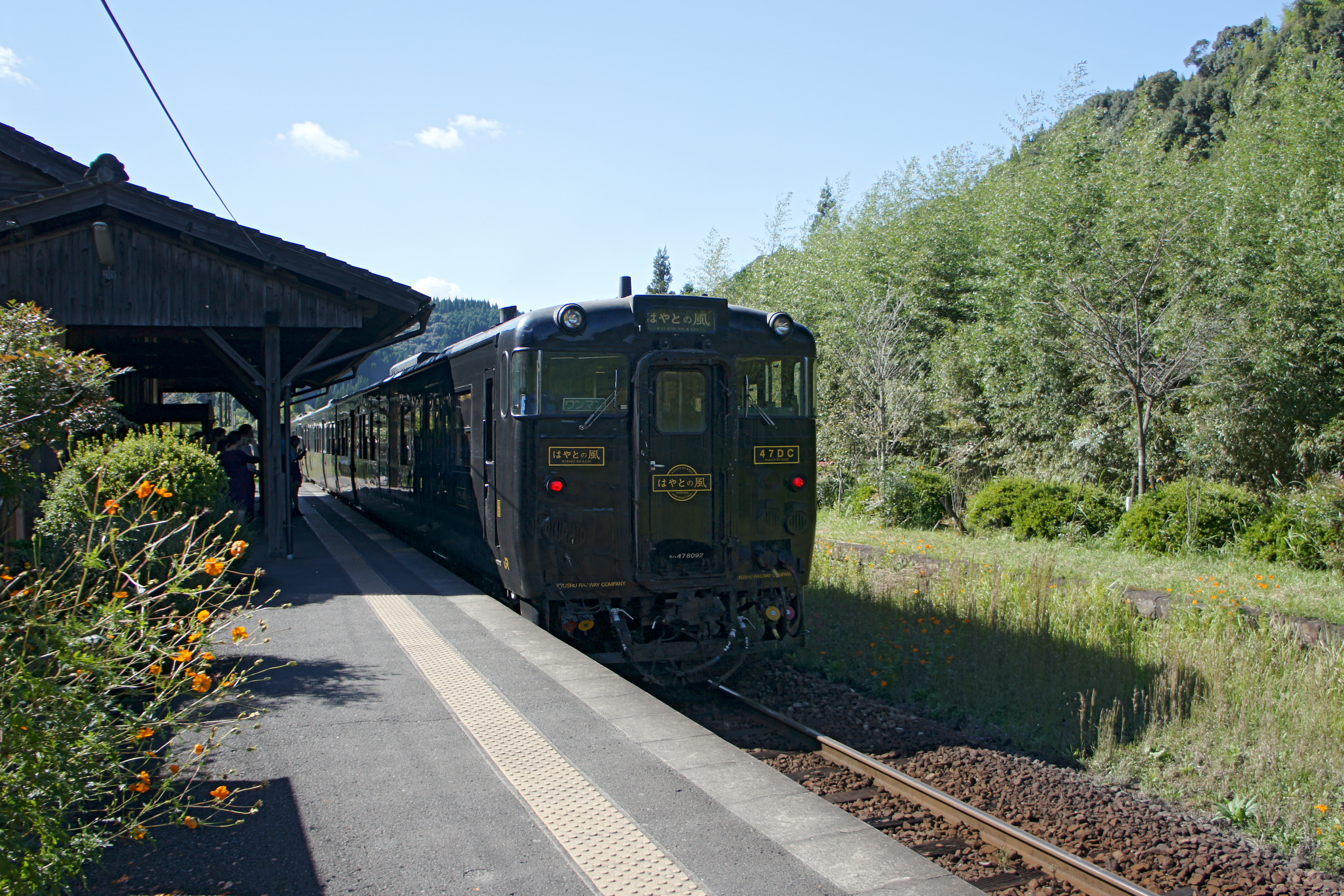
Hayato no Kaze at the platform, October 2010

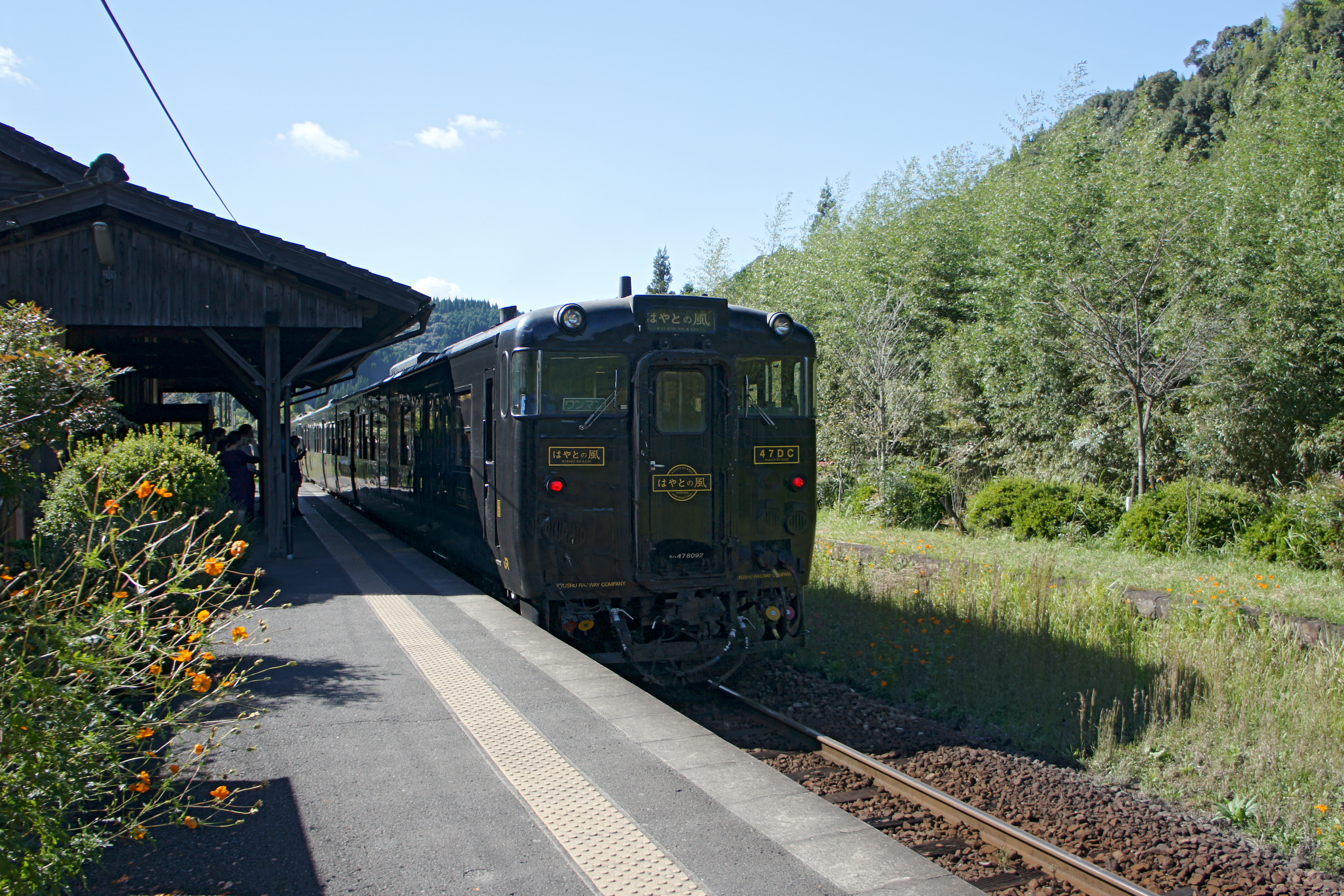
Platform

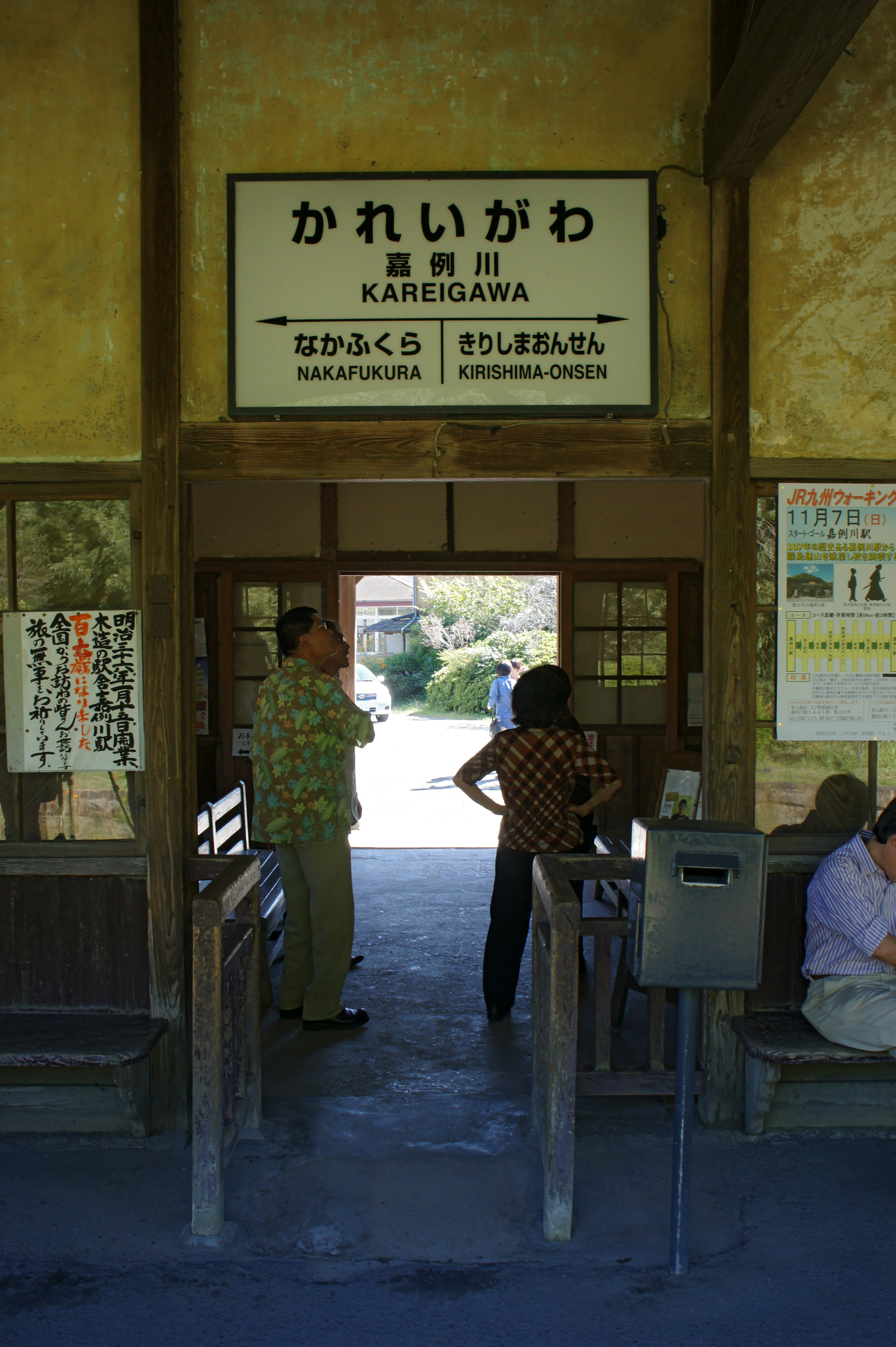
Paid area

== History ==
The station opened on 1 January 1915 on the Kagoshima Main Line. The station was the gateway to the Myoken Onsen hot spring, and as such, it served as a hub for the transport of luggage and goods. The Yatsushiro-Yoshimatsu-Kagoshima portion of the Kagoshima Main Line was separated, becoming the Hisatsu Line on 17 October 1927. With the privatization of Japanese National Railways (JNR), the successor of JGR, on 1 April 1987, the station came under the control of JR Kyushu. The station was bustling with activity, as it served as a loading and unloading point for fertilizer and crops bound for the Jusanzuka plateau until it was unstaffed in 1984. In 2003, former station employees organized a 100th anniversary celebration, but JR Kyushu did not take notice due to the station's small size. Nonetheless, the celebration attracted 1,300 people, and the station was purchased by JR Kyushu in 2004 for its commemorative and cultural value. After the opening of the Kyushu Shinkansen, the limited express train "Hayato no Kaze" began stopping at the station to promote the economic benefits of the high-speed rail line.

== Passenger statistics ==
In fiscal 2016, the station was used by an average of 73 passengers daily (boarding passengers only).

== Surrounding area ==
- Kagoshima Airport
- Kagoshima Prefectural Road Route 56
- Shinkawa Keikoku Onsen
- Kareigawa Post Office

== See also ==
- List of railway stations in Japan
