= Ōsumi-Yokogawa Station =

Railway station in Kirishima, Kagoshima Prefecture, Japan

Ōsumi-Yokogawa Station 大隅横川駅
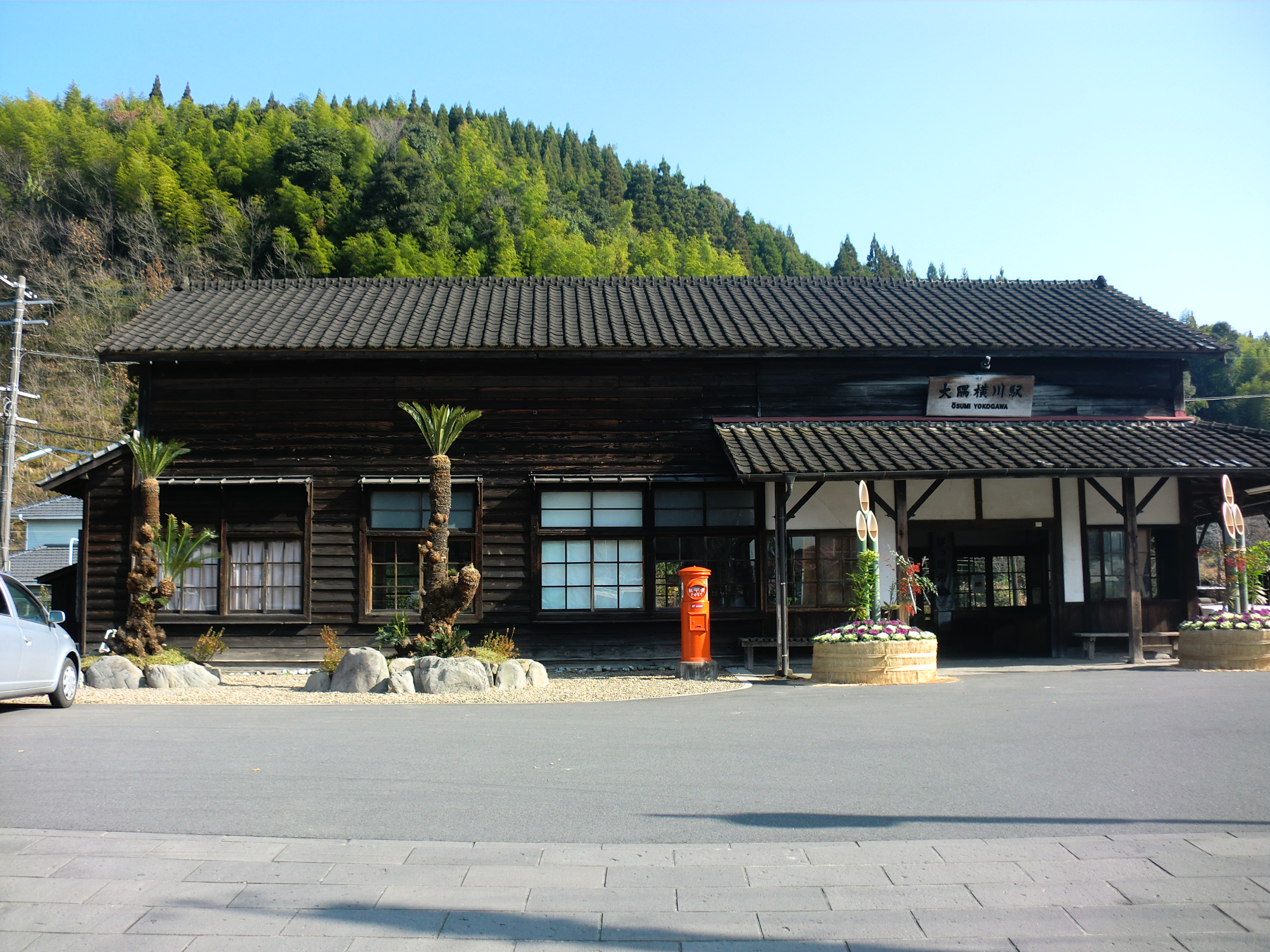
- Ōsumi-Yokogawa Station in December 2012

General information
- Location: 39-1 Yokogawacho-Nakano, Kirishima-shi, Kagoshima-ken 899-6303; Japan
- Coordinates: 31°54′20″N 130°42′11″E
- Operator: JR Kyushu
- Line: Hisatsu Line
- Distance: 100.8 km from Yatsushiro
- Platforms: 2 side platforms

Other information
- Status: Unstaffed
- Website: Official website

History
- Opened: 15 January 1903; 123 years ago

Passengers
- 2016: 220 daily

Services
Preceding station	JR Kyushu	Following station
Kurino towards Yatsushiro	Hisatsu Line	Uemura towards Hayato
Location
- Location within Kagoshima Prefecture Location within Japan

Ōsumi-Yokogawa Station (大隅横川駅, Ōsumi-Yokogawa-eki) is a passenger railway station located in the city of Kirishima, Kagoshima, Japan. It is operated by of JR Kyushu and is on the Hisatsu Line.

== Lines ==
The station is served by the Hisatsu Line and is located 100.8 km from the starting point of the line at Yatsushiro.

== Layout ==
The station consists of two opposed side platforms. It was built with a side platform and an island platform, but the central track has been removed. Although it is the central station of former Yokogawa town, it is unstaffed. During the Pacific War, freight cars parked at this station were strafed by U.S. military aircraft in July 1945, and traces still visible on the pillars of the platform. The wooden station building dates from the opening of the station and is the oldest in the prefecture, along with the one at Kareigawa Station. It is presumed that it was constructed based on the drawings for fifth-class stations, the smallest of the standard design drawings for station buildings stipulated in the "Station Ruler" of the Railway Works Bureau of the Ministry of Communications in 1900. In 2006 it was designated as a National Registered Tangible Cultural Property, managed by the local government.

=== Platforms ===
1	■ ■ Hisatsu Line	for Yoshimatsu and Miyakonojō
2	■ ■ Hisatsu Line	for Hayato and Kagoshima-Chūō

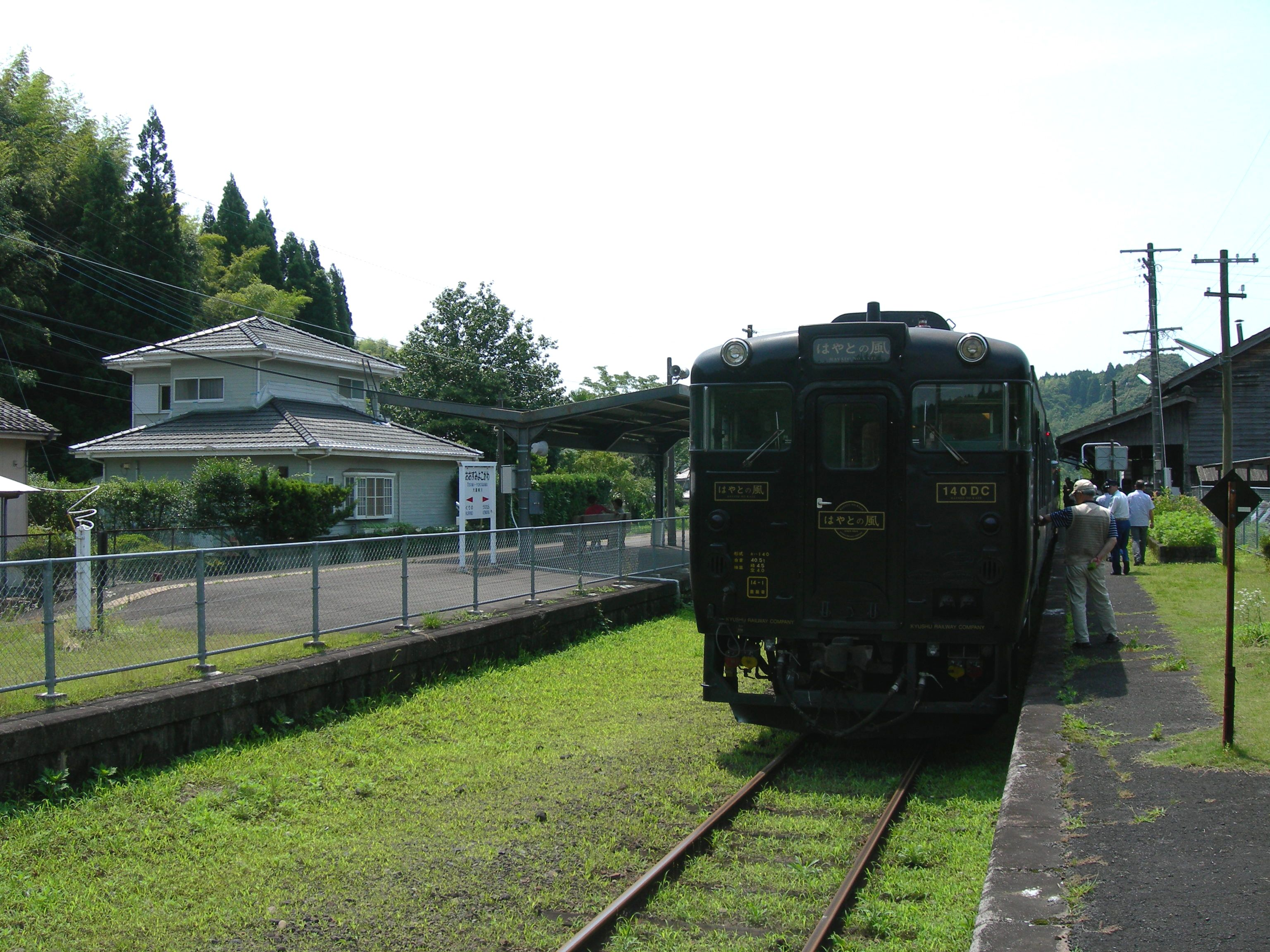
Platform

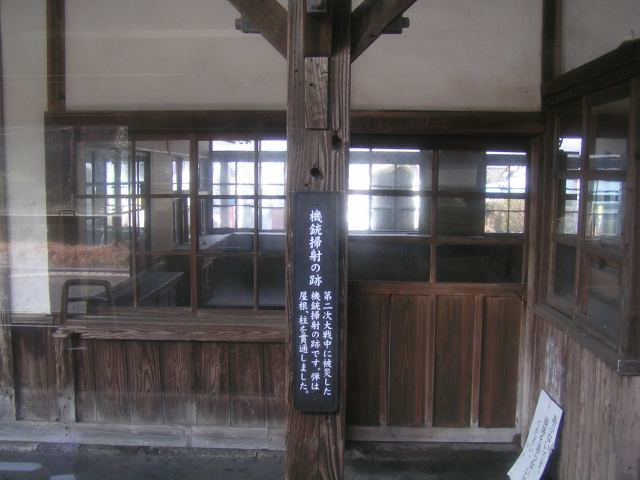
Pillar with war damage

== History ==
The station began as Yokogawa Station (横川駅) on the Kagoshima Main Line on 15 January 1903. It was renamed to its present name on 1 September 1920. The Yatsushiro-Yoshimatsu-Kagoshima portion of the Kagoshima Main Line was separated, becoming the Hisatsu Line on 17 October 1927. With the privatization of Japanese National Railways (JNR), the successor of JGR, on 1 April 1987, the station came under the control of JR Kyushu.

== Passenger statistics ==
In fiscal 2016, the station was used by an average of 220 passengers daily (boarding passengers only).

== Surrounding area ==
- Kirishima City Yokogawa Branch Office
- Kirishima City Yokogawa Elementary School
- Yokogawa Post Office
- Kyūshū Expressway

== See also ==
- List of railway stations in Japan
