= Hisatsu Line =

Railway line in Kyushu, Japan

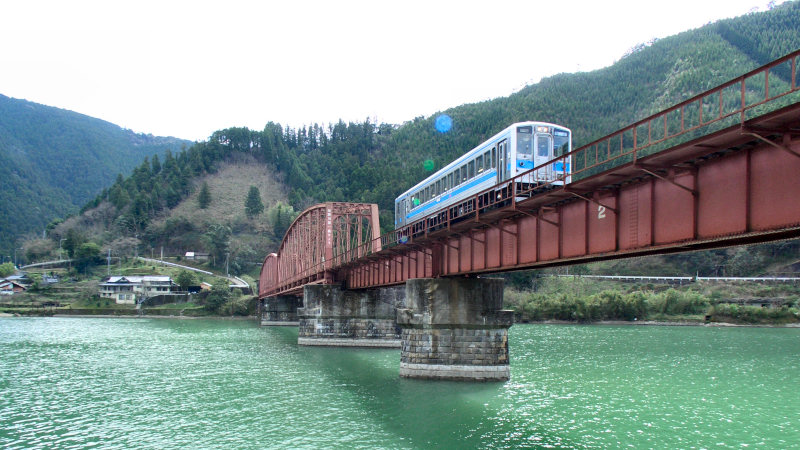
- A train (KiHa 31 series) on the Kuma River bridge in 2007

Overview
- Native name: 肥薩線
- Status: In operation
- Locale: Kyushu, Japan
- Termini: Yatsushiro; Hayato
- Stations: 28

Service
- Type: Heavy rail
- Operator: JR Kyushu
- Rolling stock: KiHa 40 series DMU, KiHa 200 series DMU

History
- Opened: 15 January 1903; 123 years ago

Technical
- Line length: 124.2 km (77.2 mi)
- Number of tracks: Single-track
- Character: Rural and scenic
- Track gauge: 1,067 mm (3 ft 6 in)
- Electrification: None
- Operating speed: 85 km/h (53 mph)
- Signalling: Special automatic closed block

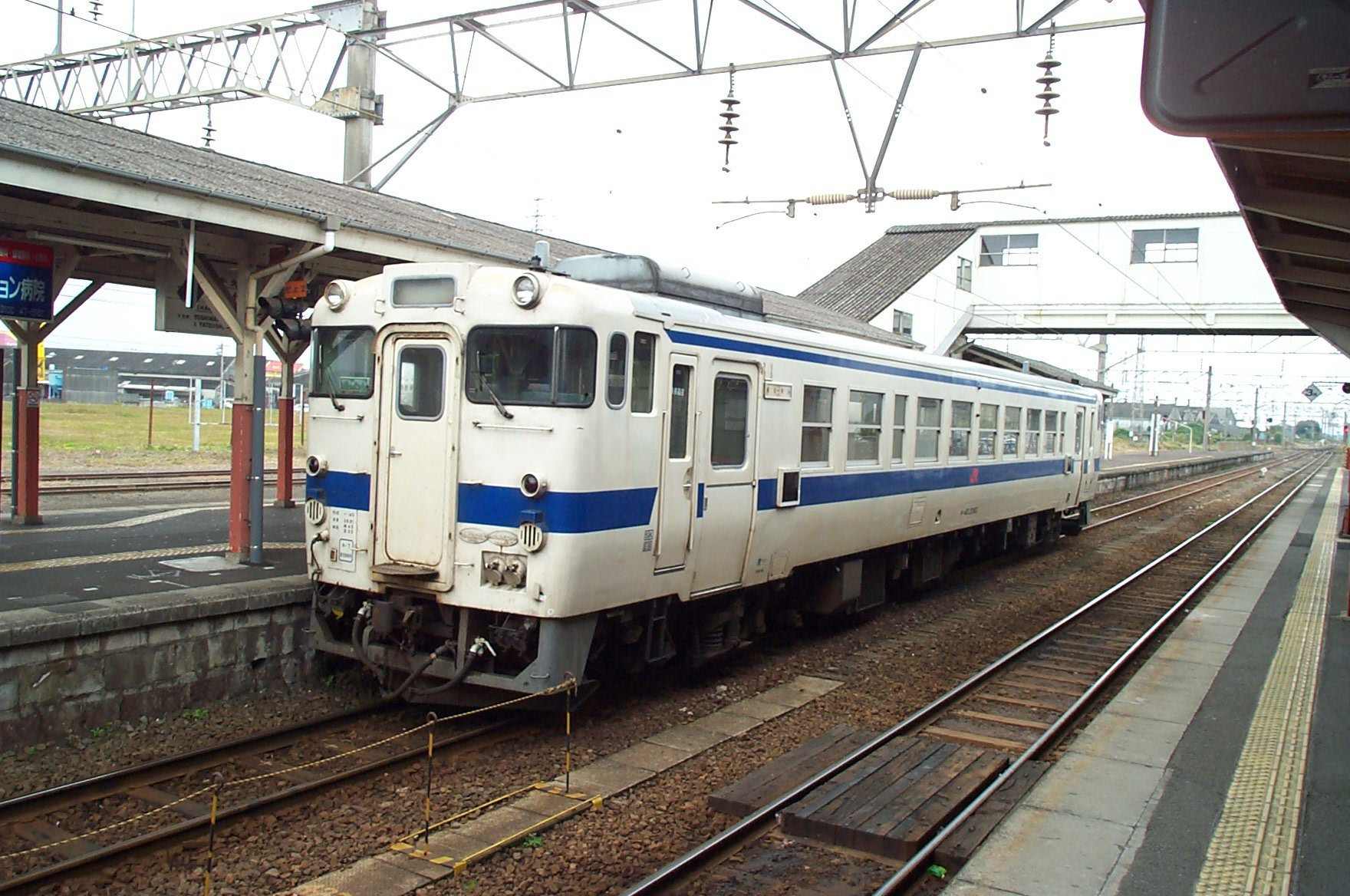
A KiHa 140 DMU operating from Hayato to Yoshimatsu

The Hisatsu Line (Japanese: 肥薩線, Hepburn: Hisatsu-sen) is a railway line in Kyushu, Japan, operated by the Kyushu Railway Company (JR Kyushu). It connects Yatsushiro on the Kagoshima Main Line to Hayato station, Kirishima on the Nippo Main Line. From 1909 the line was the original rail connection from Yatsushiro to Kagoshima (and via the Kitto Line, Miyazaki) until the Yatsushiro – Kagoshima coastal route via Sendai opened in 1927.

The major part of the line is in the mountainous Kirishima range. No through trains are operated on this line, rather, trains go from Yatsushiro to Hitoyoshi, from Hitoyoshi to Yoshimatsu, and from Yoshimatsu to Hayato. Until 2000, some trains operated direct from Kumamoto to Miyazaki via the Yatsushiro to Yoshimatsu section of the line.

== Stations ==
Station		Distance (km)	Connections	Location	
Yatsushiro	八代	0.0	Kagoshima Main Line; Hisatsu Orange Railway Line	Yatsushiro	Kumamoto
Dan	段	5.2		Yatsushiro	Kumamoto
Sakamoto	坂本	11.0		Yatsushiro	Kumamoto
Haki	葉木	14.4		Yatsushiro	Kumamoto
Kamase	鎌瀬	16.8		Yatsushiro	Kumamoto
Setoishi	瀬戸石	19.6		Yatsushiro	Kumamoto
Kaiji	海路	23.5		Ashikata	Kumamoto
Yoshio	吉尾	26.7		Ashikata	Kumamoto
Shiroishi	白石	29.8		Ashikata	Kumamoto
Kyūsendō	球泉洞	34.9		Kuma	Kumamoto
Isshōchi	一勝地	39.8		Kuma	Kumamoto
Naraguchi	那良口	42.4		Kuma	Kumamoto
Watari	渡	45.3		Kuma	Kumamoto
Nishi-Hitoyoshi	西人吉	48.4		Hitoyoshi	Kumamoto
Hitoyoshi	人吉	51.8	Kumagawa Railway Yunomae Line	Hitoyoshi	Kumamoto
Okoba	大畑	62.2		Hitoyoshi	Kumamoto
Yatake	矢岳	71.7		Hitoyoshi	Kumamoto
Masaki	真幸	79.0		Ebino	Miyazaki
Yoshimatsu	吉松	86.8	Kitto Line (Ebino Kōgen Line)	Yūsui	Kagoshima
Kurino	栗野	94.3		Yūsui	Kagoshima
Ōsumi-Yokogawa	大隅横川	100.8		Kirishima	Kagoshima
Uemura	植村	102.8		Kirishima	Kagoshima
Kirishima-Onsen	霧島温泉	106.5		Kirishima	Kagoshima
Kareigawa	嘉例川	112.3		Kirishima	Kagoshima
Nakafukura	中福良	114.4		Kirishima	Kagoshima
Hyōkiyama	表木山	116.8		Kirishima	Kagoshima
Hinatayama	日当山	121.6		Kirishima	Kagoshima
Hayato	隼人	124.2	Nippō Main Line	Kirishima	Kagoshima

== Rolling stock ==
=== Current rolling stock ===
As of August 2025, the following rolling stock operates on the line:

- KiHa 40 & 47 series DMU
- KiHa 200 series[ja] DMU

=== Former rolling stock ===
The SL Hitoyoshi steam locomotive ran on the line until March 23, 2024:

- JGR Class 8620 steam locomotive hauling JNR 50 series[ja] passenger cars

== History ==
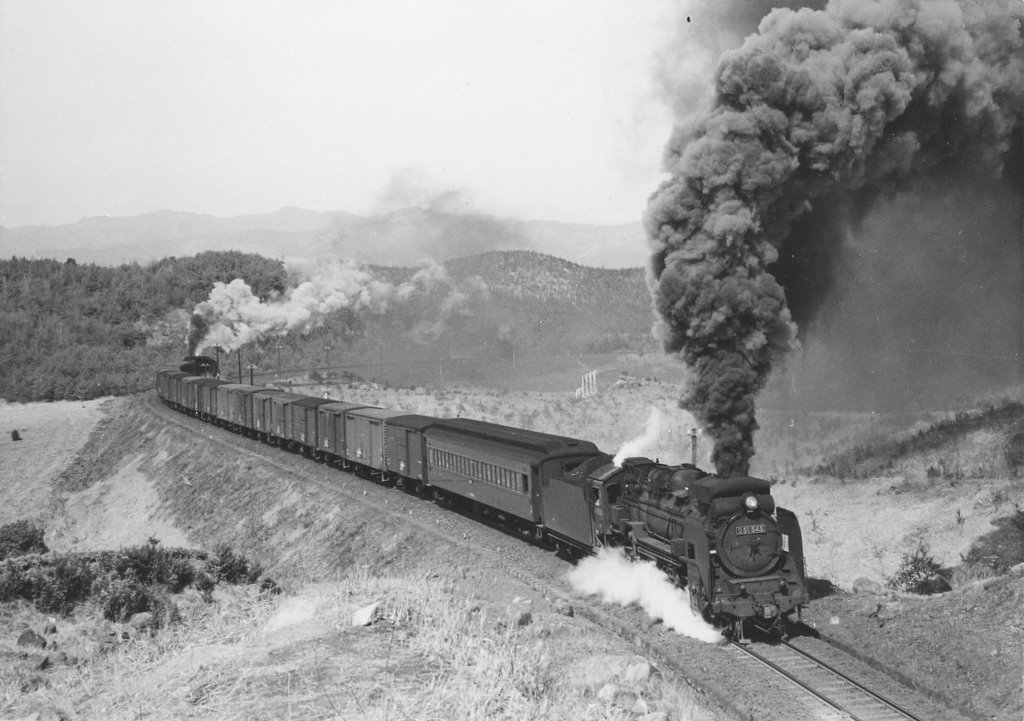
JNR Class D51 steam locomotives 545 & 890 double heading a train on the Hisatsu Line between Okoba and Yatake, 8 March 1970

The entire line was built by the government railways. The Hayato – Yoshimatsu section was opened in 1903, followed by the Yatsushiro – Hitoyoshi section in 1908. When the line names were officially designated in October 1909, the former became a part of the Kagoshima Main Line and the latter the Hitoyoshi Main Line. In November 1910, with the Hitoyoshi – Yoshimatsu section (which included the Okoba switchback and spiral) opening, both sections were connected and the Hitoyoshi Main Line was merged to the Kagoshima Main Line.

In 1927, following the opening of the current 'west coast' Kagoshima Main Line via Sendai, the line was renamed the Hitatsu Line.

Freight services ceased the day the line (and the entire JNR system) was privatised in 1987.

=== Former connecting lines ===
Kurino station – the Yamano Line junctioned here. The first 24 km section of the Yamano Line was opened to Yamano in 1921. The 14 km Minamata (on the Kagoshima Main Line) – Kugino section opened in 1934, and the 10 km Yamano – Satsuma-Fuke section the following year. In 1937, the 8 km Kugino – Satsuma-Fuke section, including the Okawa spiral opened, connecting the two sections. Freight services ceased in 1986, and the line closed in 1988.

=== Flood damage ===
Since 4 July 2020, no trains have operated on the 86.8 km section of the line between Yatsushiro and Yoshimatsu, due to catastrophic damage caused by the 2020 Kyushu floods, including much of the track being completely destroyed, especially in areas where the line runs directly parallel to the Kuma River. Limited taxi replacement services are operating on weekdays only between Yatushiro and Hitoyoshi.

JR Kyushu has not announced a set date for resumption of rail service on this section, apart from stating that services would be suspended for an indefinite period. JR Kyushu's president Toshihiko Aoyagi has stated that the restoration cost can not be determined until agreements have been made amongst local communities, prefectures and the national government, regarding management of the Kuma River. On 17 March 2022, the restoration cost was estimated to be about 23 billion yen.

The citizens' support group Hisatsu Line-again (肥薩線again) are campaigning and raising support and awareness for the line's full restoration and return to service.

From 7 August 2025 to 11 July 2026, no trains operated on the 37.4 km section of the line between Yoshimatsu and Hayato, due to damage caused by heavy rainfall. During that period, limited bus replacement services operated on weekdays only.

Train services on the 37.4 km section between Yoshimatsu and Hayato were originally scheduled to resume on 28 June 2026, however, it was later announced on 22 June of that year that train services on that section would remain suspended as a result of more damage caused by heavy rainfall with repairs estimated to take at least two weeks from the time the new damage occurred. Later as repairs progressed, the section between Yoshimatsu and Hayato resumed service on 12 July 2026.

== In popular culture ==
The track section between Yatsushiro and Yoshimatsu was featured in Microsoft Train Simulator. A Hisatsu Line-based layout is available for the Japanese model train simulator VRM.

== Bibliography ==
Route diagram: Nippon Rettō - Tetsudō-kigen (にっぽん列島 - 鉄道紀元) pp. 12–14, Vol. 14, October 25, 2006 - JTB Publishing.
