= Hayato Station (Kagoshima) =

Railway station in Kirishima, Kagoshima Prefecture, Japan

Hayato Station 隼人駅
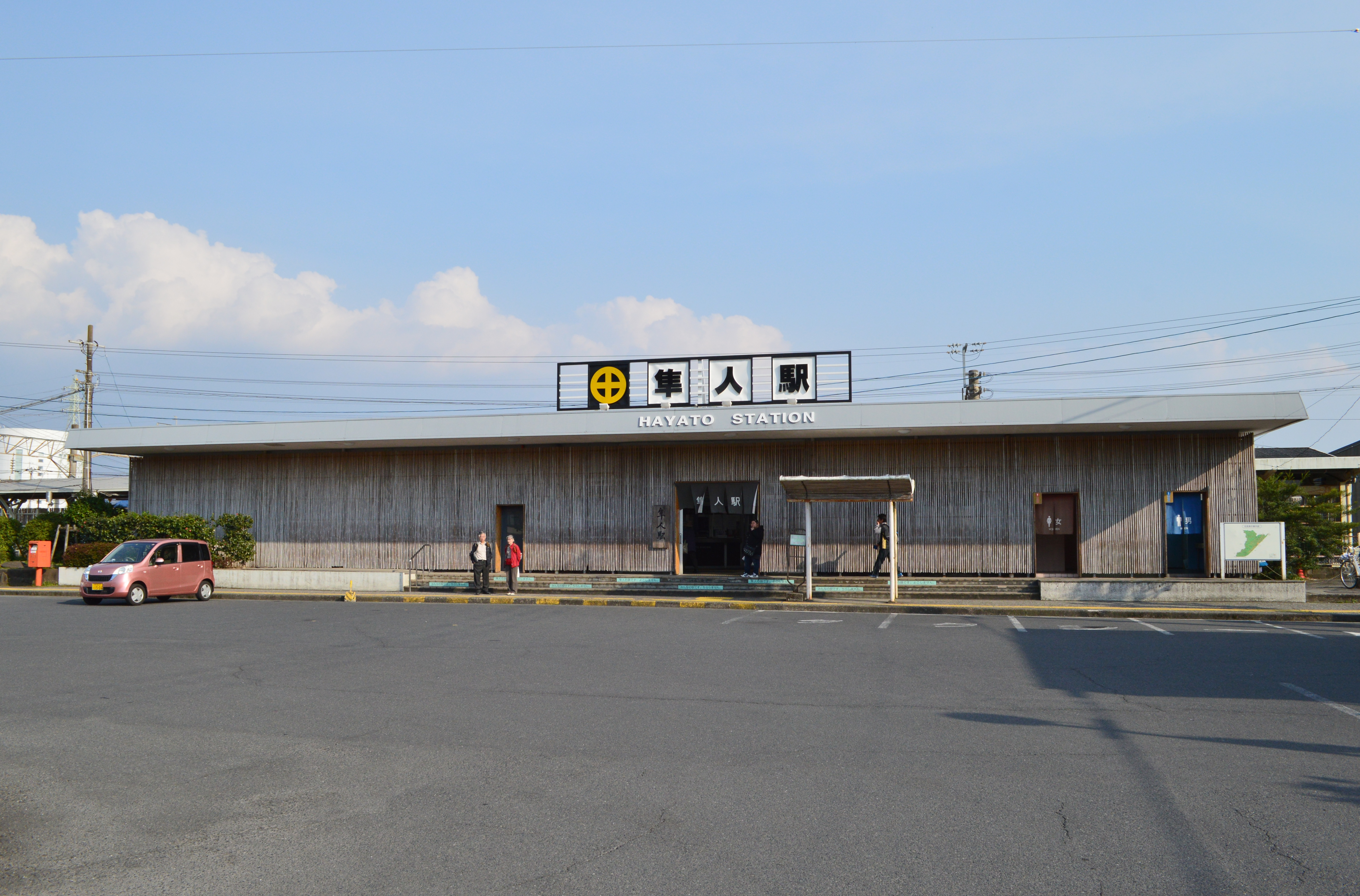
- Hayato Station in March 2018

General information
- Location: Hayato-Chō Mitsugi, Kirishima-shi, Kagoshima-ken 899-5117; Japan
- Coordinates: 31.7438°N 130.7397°E
- Operator: JR Kyushu
- Lines: ■ Nippō Main Line; ■ Hisatsu Line
- Distance: 434.7 km from Kokura
- Platforms: 1 side platform + 1 island platform
- Tracks: 3 + multiple sidings

Construction
- Structure type: At grade
- Parking: Available at forecourt
- Cycle facilities: Designated parking area for bikes
- Accessible: No - island platform accessed by footbridge

Other information
- Status: Staffed ticket window (Midori no Madoguchi) (outsourced)
- Website: Official website

History
- Opened: 10 June 1901
- Former names: Kokubu (until 1 September 1929); Nishi-Kokubu (until 15 September 1930)

Passengers
- FY2022: 1495
- Rank: 112th (JR Kyushu)

Services
Preceding station	JR Kyushu	Following station
Kajiki towards Kagoshima	Nippō Main Line Local	Kokubu towards Kokura
Hinatayama towards Yatsushiro	Hisatsu Line	Terminus
Location
- Location within Kagoshima Prefecture Location within Japan

Hayato Station (隼人駅, Hayato-eki) is a junction passenger railway station located in the city of Kirishima, Kagoshima, Japan. It is operated by JR Kyushu and is on the Nippō Main Line.

== Lines ==
The station is served by the Nippō Main Line and is located 434.7 km from the starting point of the line at Kokura. It is also the southern terminus of the 124.2 kilometer Hisatsu Line to Yatsushiro.

== Layout ==
The station consists of a side platform and an island platform serving three tracks at grade. A passing loop and two sidings branch off track 3 to the southeast. The station building, located on the northwest side of the tracks, is a modern concrete structure with bamboo trim which houses a waiting area, automatic ticket vending machines and staffed ticket window. Access to the island platform is by means of a footbridge.

Management of the passenger facilities at the station has been outsourced to the JR Kyushu Tetsudou Eigyou Co., a wholly owned subsidiary of JR Kyushu specialising in station services. There is a Midori no Madoguchi ticket counter.

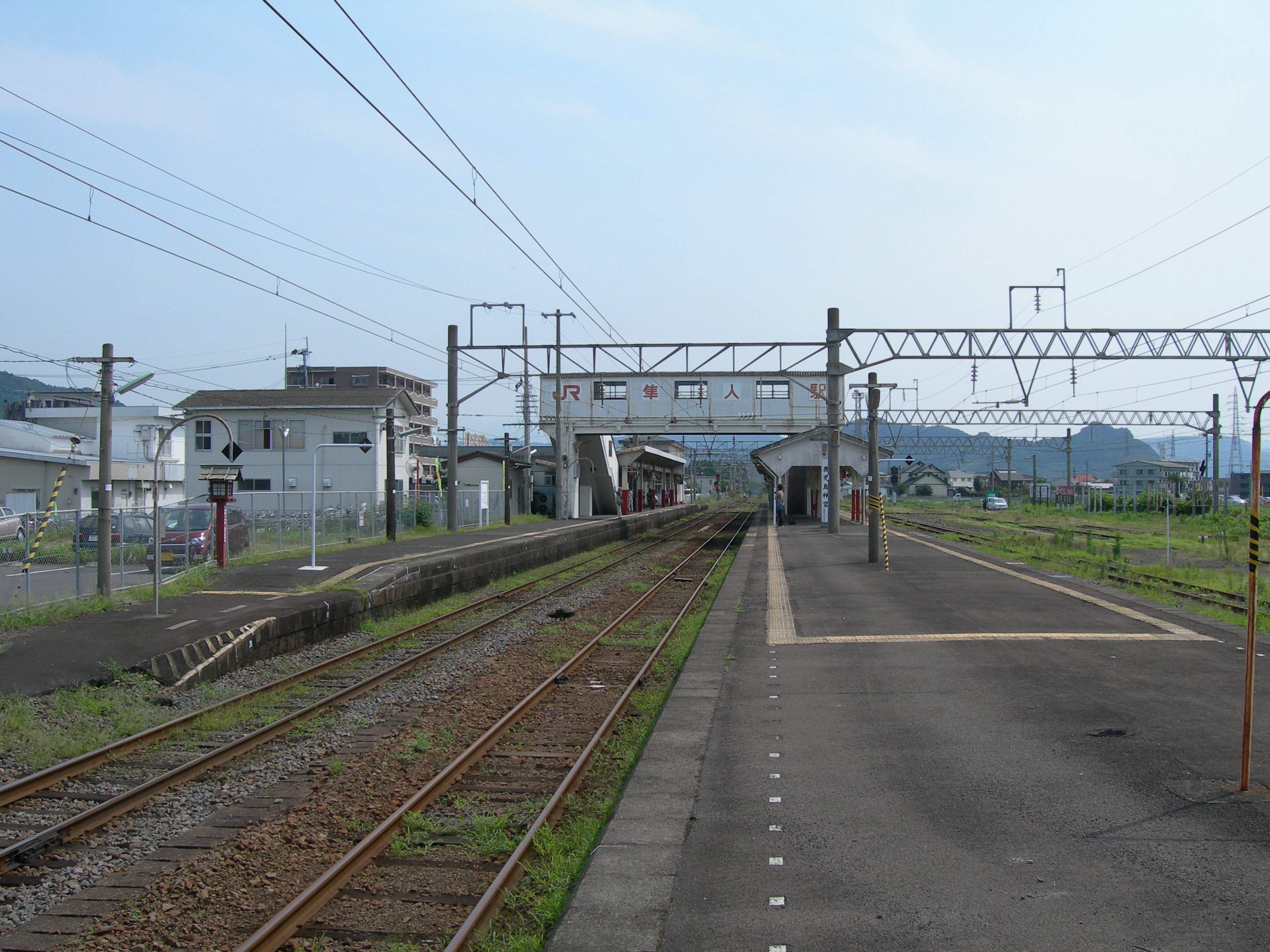
A view of the station platforms. The sidings can be seen to the extreme right.

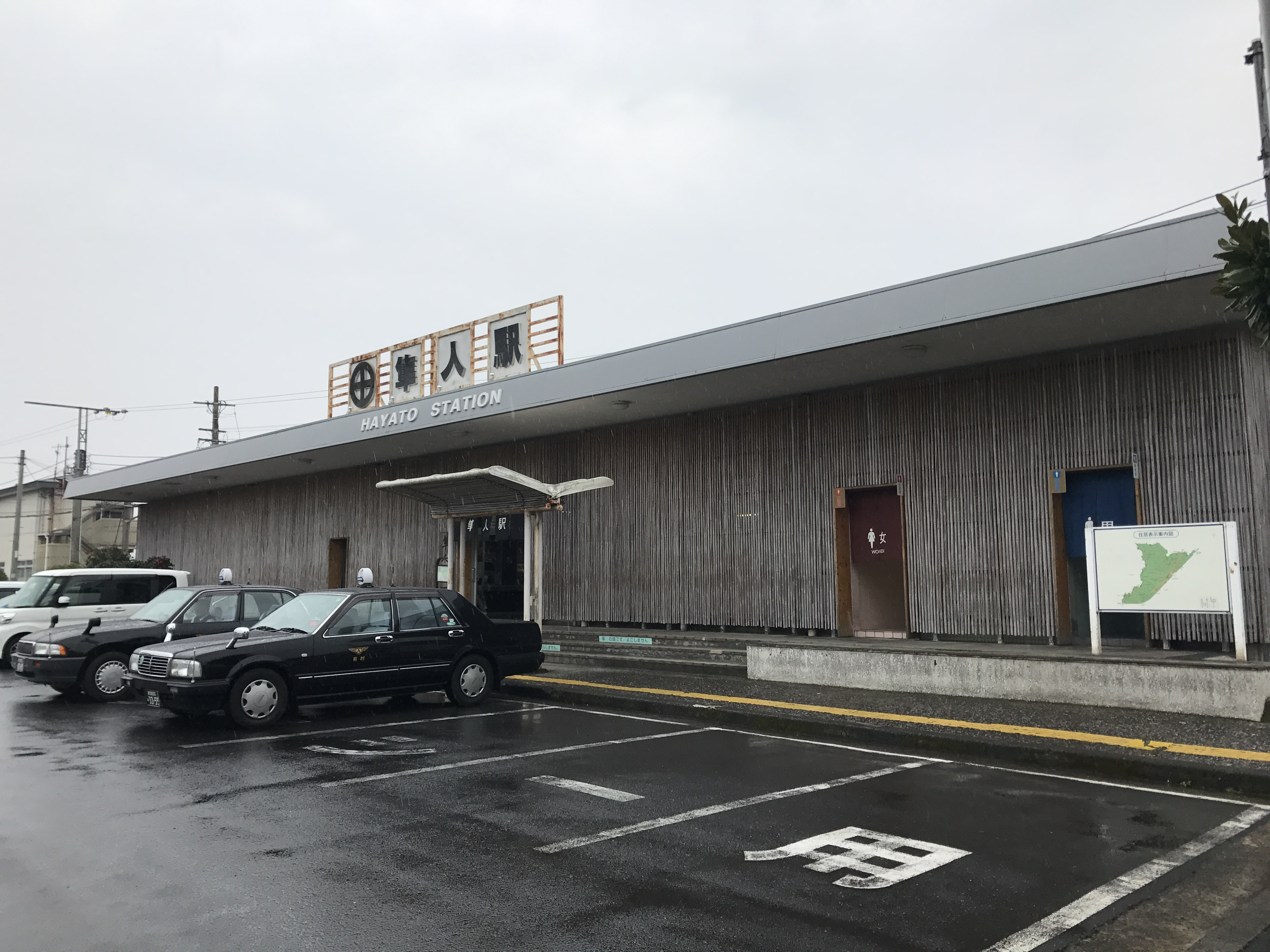
A close-in view of the station building showing the bamboo trim on the walls.

=== Platforms ===
1, 2	■ ■ Nippō Main Line	for Kagoshima and Kagoshima-Chūō for Miyakonojō and Miyazaki
1, 2	■ ■ Hisatsu Line	for Yoshimatsu and Yatsushiro
3	■ ■ Nippō Main Line	for Kagoshima and Kagoshima-Chūō

== History ==
The station was opened with the name of Kokubu on 10 June 1901 by Japanese Government Railways (JGR) as the northern terminus of the then Kagoshima Line which it had laid from Kagoshima. From here, the track was extended north in phases, reaching Yokogawa (now Ōsumi-Yokogawa) on 15 January 1903 and Yoshimatsu on 5 September 1903. By 1909, the track had linked up with the Hitoyoshi line reaching south from Yatsushiro. Through traffic was achieved between Mojikō in the north of Kyushu to Kagoshima in the south. The entire stretch of track from Mojikō through Yatsushiro, Kokubu to Kagoshima was redesignated as the Kagoshima Main Line on 21 November 1909.

By 1927, another track from Yatsushiro through Sendai to Kagoshima had been built and this was now designated as part of the Kagoshima Main Line. The track from Yatsushiro through Kokubu to Kagoshima was thus redesignated as the Hisatsu Line on 17 October 1927.

On 1 September 1929, the station was renamed Nishi-Kokubu. On 24 November 1929, a new track, the Kokuto-West Line (国都西線) was opened to another station further to the east which took on the previous name of Kokubu. On 15 September 1930, Nishi-Kokubu was renamed to Hayato. The Kokuto-West Line was expanded to the east and north, linking up with the Kokuto-East Line and other networks so that by the end of 1932, through-traffic had been established between Kokura and Kagoshima. On 6 December 1932, the entire stretch of track from Kokura through Hayato to Kagoshima was redesignated as the Nippō Main Line. At the same time, Hayato became the southern terminus of the Hisatsu Line. With the privatization of Japanese National Railways (JNR), the successor of JGR, on 1 April 1987, the station came under the control of JR Kyushu.

== Passenger statistics ==
In fiscal 2022, the station was used by an average of 1495 passengers daily (boarding passengers only), and it ranked 112nd among the busiest stations of JR Kyushu.

== Surrounding area ==
- Hayato Post Office
- Kirishima City Hall Hayato Branch
- Kagoshima Shrine

== See also ==
- List of railway stations in Japan
