= Yatsushiro Station =

Railway station in Yatsushiro, Kumamoto Prefecture, Japan

Yatsushiro Station 八代駅
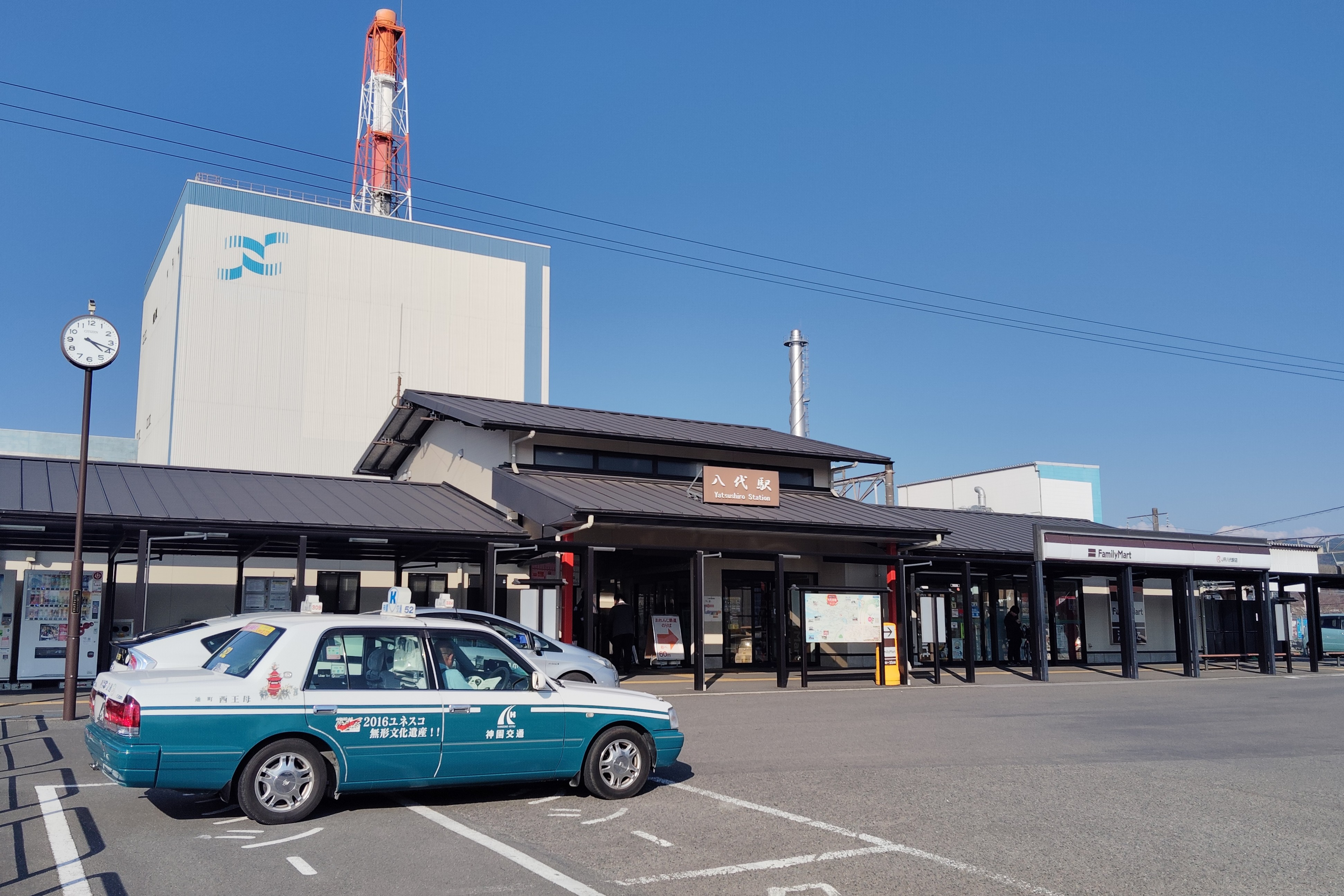
- Yatsushiro Station in September 2021

General information
- Location: Hagiwaramachi, Yatsushiro-shi, Kumamoto-ken 866-0831; Japan
- Coordinates: 32.503835°N 130.621584°E
- Operator: JR Kyushu; ● Hisatsu Orange Railway; JR Freight
- Lines: ■ Kagoshima Main Line; ■ Hisatsu Line; ■ Hisatsu Orange Railway Line
- Platforms: 1 island + 1 side platform

Other information
- Station code: OR01 (Hisatsu Orange Railway)
- Website: Official website

History
- Opened: November 21, 1896

Passengers
- 1515 daily (JR 2020); 587 (Hisatsu Orange FY2019)
Location
- Location within Kumamoto Prefecture Location within Japan

Yatsushiro Station (八代駅, Yatsushiro-eki) is a junction passenger railway station located in the city of Yatsushiro, Kumamoto Prefecture, Japan. It is operated by JR Kyushu and the third-sector railway company Hisatsu Orange Railway. It is also a freight depot for the Japan Freight Railway Company (JR Freight).

== Lines ==
The station is served by the Kagoshima Main Line and is located 232.3 km from the starting point of the line at Mojiko, and is also the western terminus of the124.2 kilometer Hisatsu Line to Hayato, although since 4 July 2020, no trains have operated on the 86.8 km section of the line between Yatsushiro and Yoshimatsu, due to catastrophic damage caused by the 2020 Kyushu floods, including much of the track being completely destroyed, especially in areas where the line runs directly parallel to the Kuma River. JR Kyushu has not announced a set date for resumption of rail service on this section, apart from stating that services would be suspended for an indefinite period. .

The station is also the northern terminus of the 116.9 kilometer Hisatsu Orange Railway Line to Sendai.

== Layout ==
The station consists of one island platform with two tracks, one side platform with one track, and one additional cut-out platform. Between platforms 1 and 2 there is a center track for inbound trains, a siding next to platform 3, and next to that is a platform for JR Freight freight trains (departing and arriving at JR Freight Yatsushiro Station Freight Depot). On the JR Kyushu side platform, there are two elevators connecting platform 1 with platforms 2 and 3. The Kagoshima side single platform and the cut-out platform are used by Hisatsu Orange Railway. The center track and siding are mainly used by freight trains. The JR Kyushu and Hisatsu Orange Railway station buildings are separate, but the tracks are connected, and in the middle of platform 1 there is a partition and connecting ticket gate where transfers are handled. The JR station has a Midori no Madoguchi staffed ticket office

== Platforms ==
1	■ Hisatsu Orange Railway Line	for Minamata and Sendai
2	■ Hisatsu Orange Railway Line	for Minamata and Sendai for Shin-Yatsushiro

1-3	■ ■ Kagoshima Main Line	for Kumamoto
1-3	■ ■ Hisatsu Line	for Hitoyoshi and Yoshimatsu (operations suspended)

== Adjacent stations ==
←	Service	→
Kagoshima Main Line
Shin-Yatsushiro	Local	Terminus
Hisatsu Line
Terminus	Local	Dan
Hisatsu Orange Railway Line
(Shin-Yatsushiro)	Local	Higo Kouda

== History ==
Yatsushiro Station was opened on 21 November 1896 as a station on the Kyushu Railway, which was nationalized in 1907. After the privatization of the Japanese National Railways (JNR) on 1 April 1987, the station came under JR Kyushu.

== Passenger statistics ==
In fiscal 2020, the JR station was used by an average of 1,515 passengers daily (boarding passengers only), and it ranked 96th among the busiest stations of JR Kyushu. During the same period, the Hisatsu Orange Railway portion of the station was used by 587 passengers daily.

== Surrounding area ==
- Yatsushiro City Hall
- Yatsushiro Castle

== See also ==
- List of railway stations in Japan
