= Sakamoto Station =

Sakamoto Station may refer to:

- Sakamoto Station (Kumamoto) (坂本駅) in Kumamoto Prefecture, Japan
- Sakamoto Station (Miyagi) (坂元駅) in Miyagi Prefecture, Japan

It may also refer to:

- Sakamoto-hieizanguchi Station in Shiga Prefecture, Japan
- Cable Sakamoto Station in Shiga Prefecture, Japan
- Hieizan Sakamoto Station in Shiga Prefecture, Japan
