= Fukuro Station =

Railway station in Minamata, Kumamoto Prefecture, Japan

Fukuro Station 袋駅
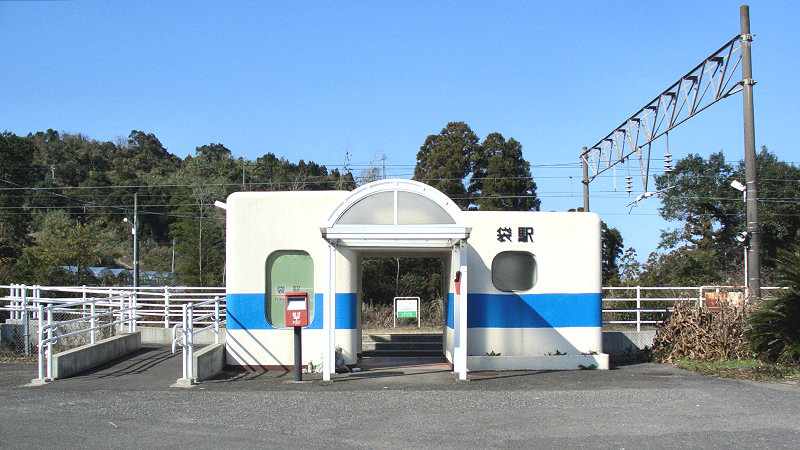
- Small station building in 2007

General information
- Location: Fukuro, Minamata-shi, Kumamoto-ken 867-0034; Japan
- Coordinates: 32.16557°N 130.37427°E
- Operator: Hisatsu Orange Railway Co., Ltd.
- Line: Hisatsu Orange Railway
- Distance: 55.4 km from Yatsushiro; 5.8 km from Minamata
- Platforms: 2 side platforms
- Tracks: 2

Construction
- Structure type: At-grade

Other information
- Station code: OR14
- Website: Official (in Japanese)

History
- Opened: 21 July 1926
- Original company: Japanese Government Railways
Location
- Location within Kumamoto Prefecture Location within Japan

Fukuro Station (袋駅, Fukuro-eki) is a passenger railway station in the city of Minamata, Kumamoto Prefecture, Japan. It is served by the third-sector railway company Hisatsu Orange Railway

== Lines ==
The station is served by the Hisatsu Orange Railway Line that follows the former coastal route of the JR Kyushu Kagoshima Main Line connecting Yatsushiro and Sendai. It is located 55.4 km from the starting point of the line at Yatsushiro.

== Station layout ==
The station consists of two opposed side platforms at street level, connected by a footbridge. The small station building has a similar design to Higo Futami.

=== Platforms ===
1	■ ■ Hisatsu Orange Railway	for Izumi and Sendai
2	■ ■ Hisatsu Orange Railway	for Minamata and Yatsushiro

== Gallery ==
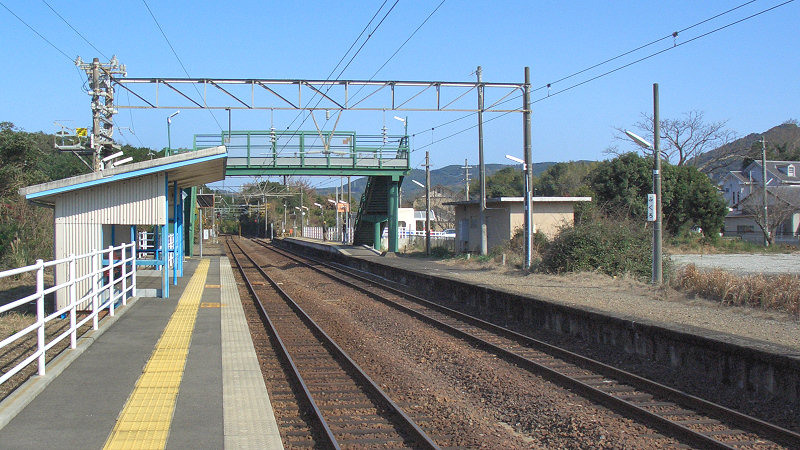
View of station platforms

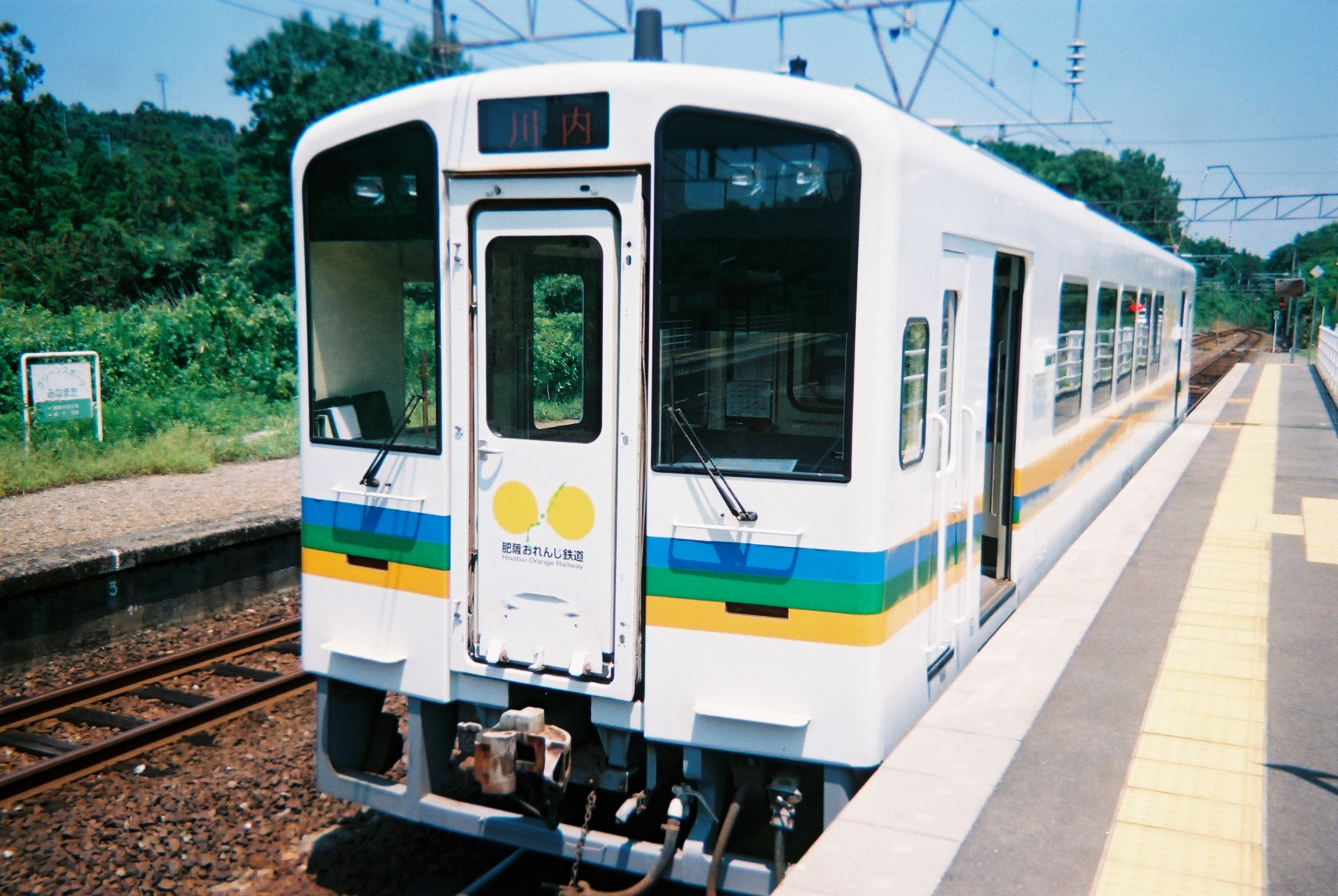
Hisatsu Orange Railway HSOR-100 series at Fukuro Station

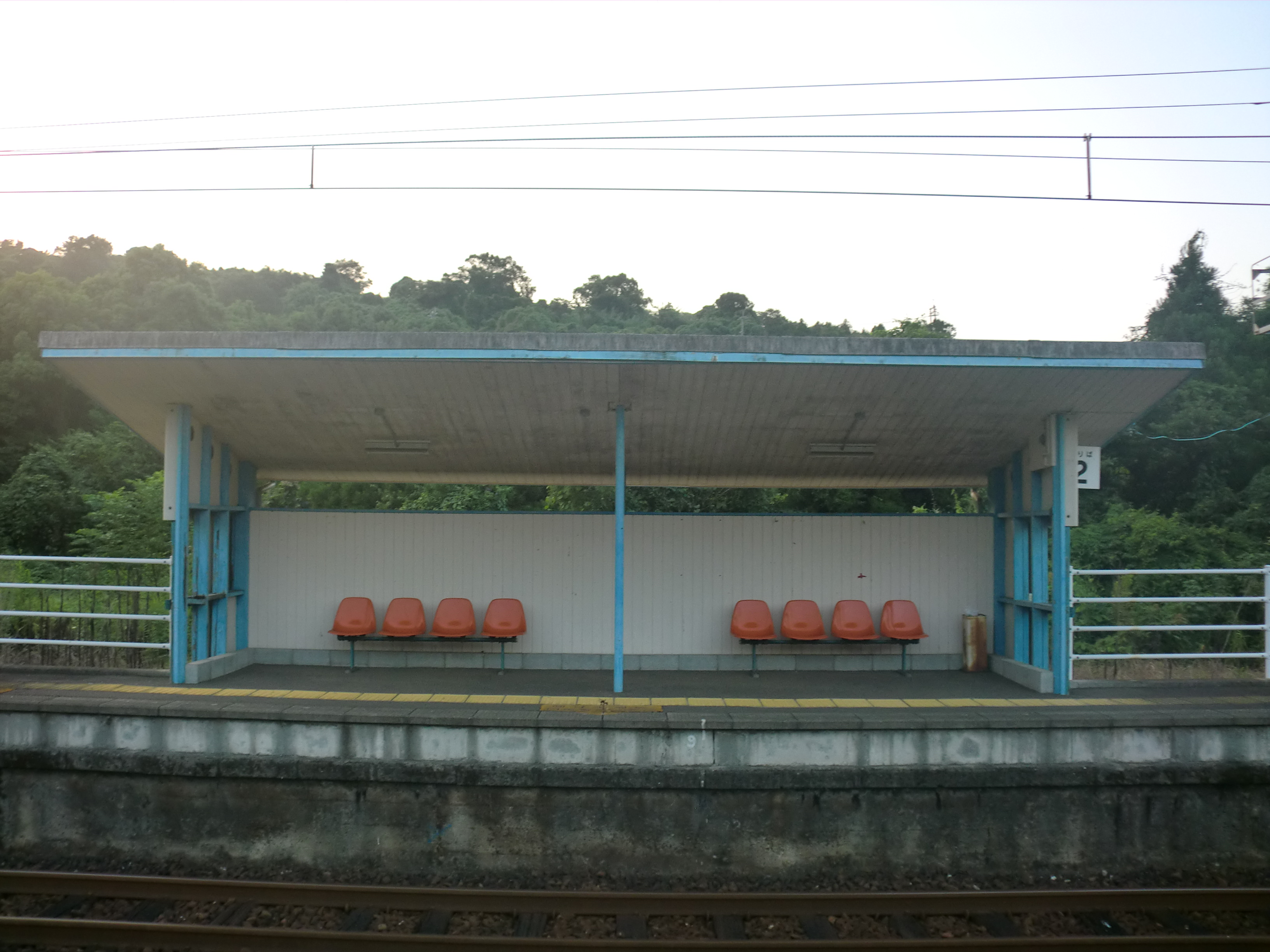
Platform shelter

== Adjacent stations ==
«	Service	»
Hisatsu Orange Railway Line
Minamata	–	Komenotsu
Rapid Express Super Orange: Does not stop at this station

== History ==
Fukuro Station was opened on 21 July 1926 as a station on the Japanese Government Railways Kagoshima Main Line. With the privatization of the Japan National Railways on 1 April 1987, the station was transferred to JR Kyushu. On 13 March 2004, with the opening of the Kyushu Shinkansen, the station was transferred to the Hisatsu Orange Railway.

== Passenger statistics ==
The average daily passenger traffic in fiscal 2019 was 26 passengers.

== Surrounding area ==
- Japan National Route 3

== See also ==
- List of railway stations in Japan
