= Komenotsu Station =

Railway station in Izumi, Kagoshima Prefecture, Japan

Komenotsu Station: 米ノ津駅; こめのつ
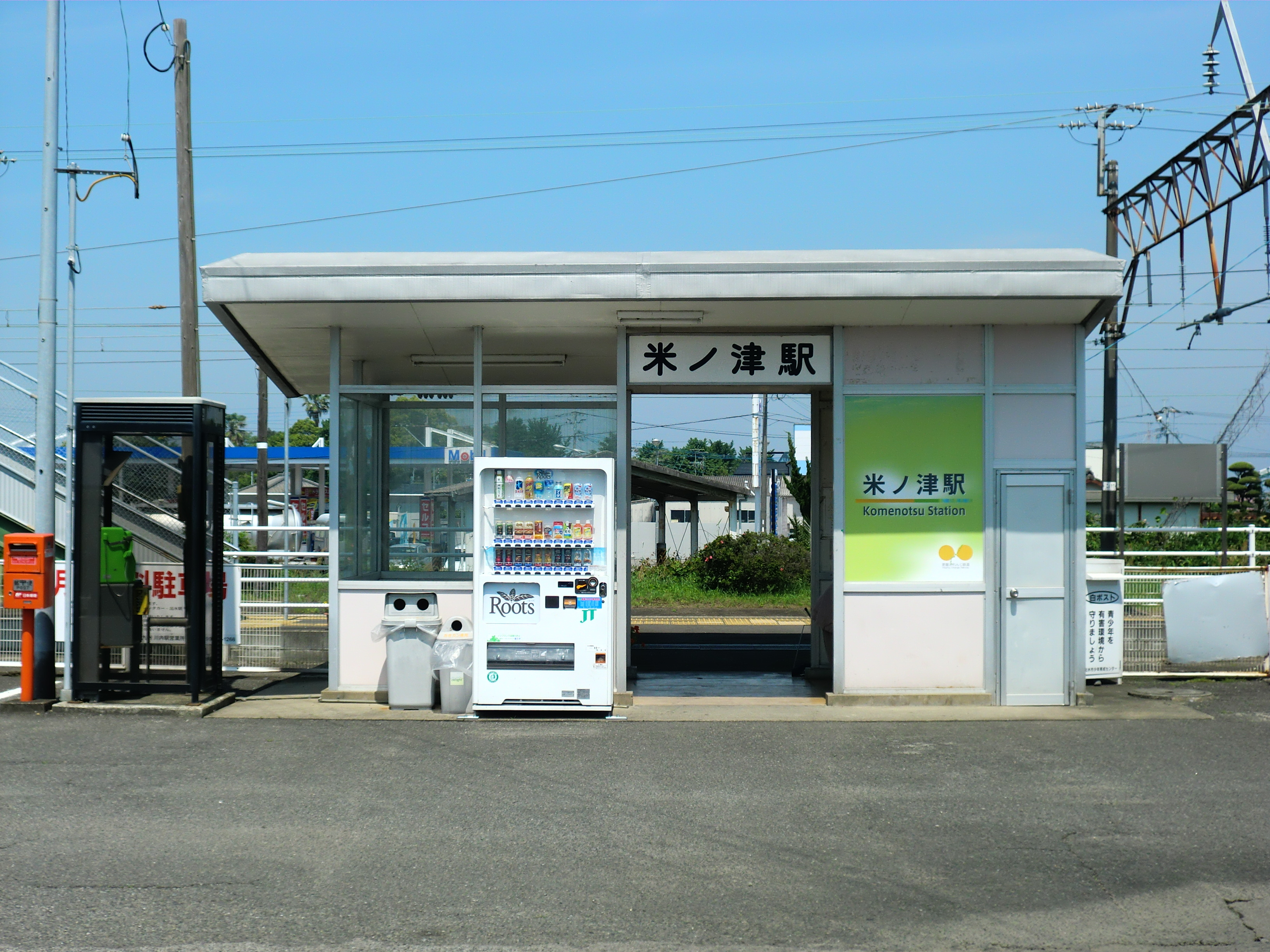
- Komenotsu Station in 2011

General information
- Location: 40 Komenotsumachi, Izumi-shi, Kagoshima-ken 899-0121; Japan
- Coordinates: 32.12215°N 130.34198°E
- Operator: Hisatsu Orange Railway Co., Ltd.
- Line: ■ Hisatsu Orange Railway Line
- Distance: 61.3 km from Yatsushiro; 5.9 km from Fukuro
- Platforms: 2 side platforms
- Tracks: 2

Construction
- Structure type: At-grade

Other information
- Website: Official website (in Japanese)

History
- Opened: 15 October 1923
- Original company: Japanese Government Railways

Passengers
- FY2019: 205
Location
- Location within Kagoshima Prefecture Location within Japan

Komenotsu Station (米ノ津駅, Komenotsu-eki) is a passenger railway station located in the city of Izumi, Kagoshima Prefecture, Japan. It is served and operated by third-sector railway company Hisatsu Orange Railway.

== Station layout ==
The station consists of two staggered side platforms at street level. During the JNR era, the station consisted of a wooden station building, and there was a freight siding and platform on the east side, as well as several small freight handling sidings on the west side, where freight cars parked at the neighboring Izumi Station were shunted and freight was loaded and unloaded at the nearby Yonotsu Port. However, when freight handling at Izumi Station was abolished in 1984, freight handling at this station was also abolished, and all but a few of the sidings were removed and the station building was demolished in 1985 and the current prefabricated station building was completed the same year.

=== Platforms ===
1	■ ■ Hisatsu Orange Railway	for Minamata, and Yatsushiro
2	■ ■Hisatsu Orange Railway	for Izumi, Akune and Sendai

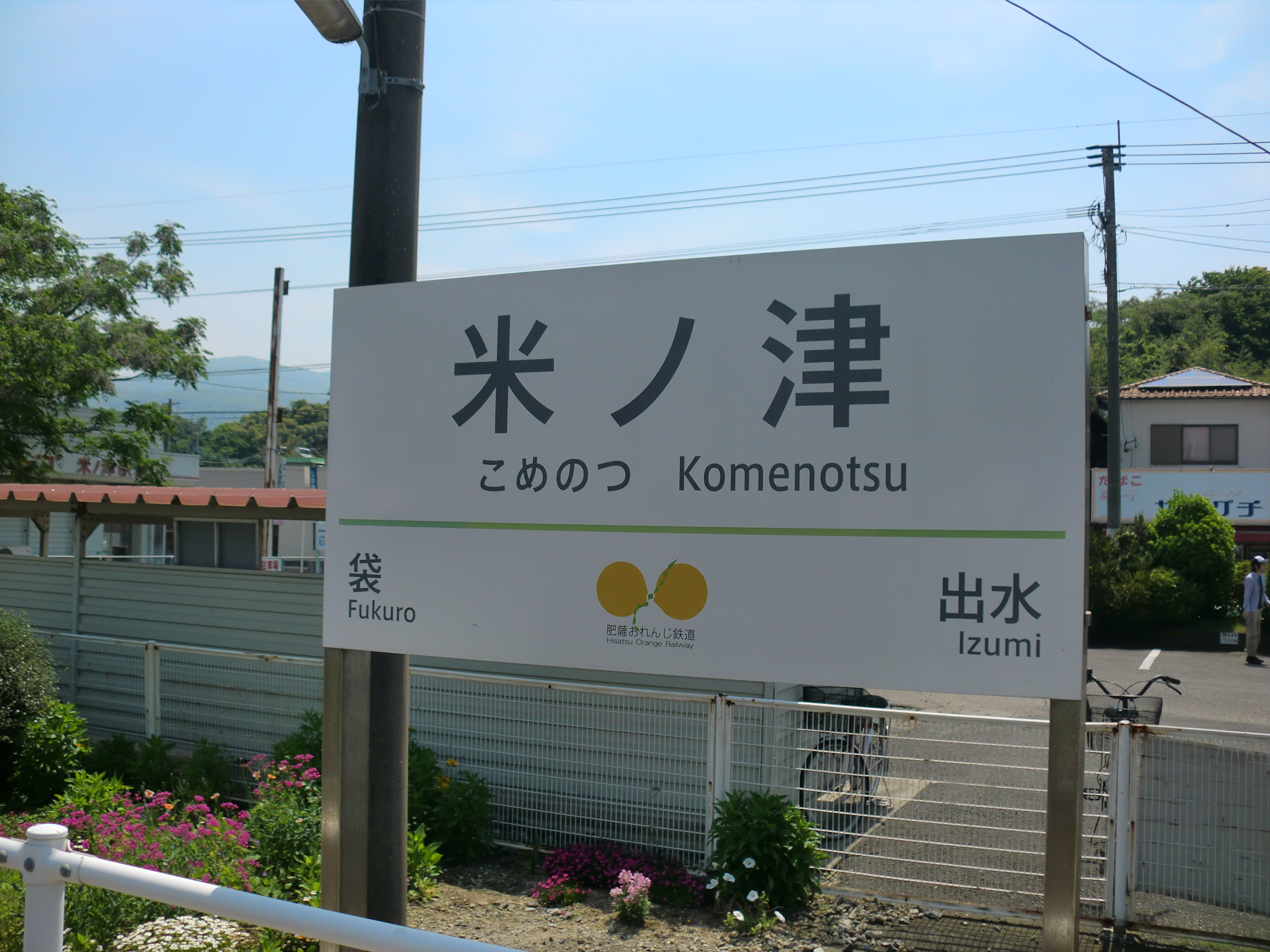
Station sign

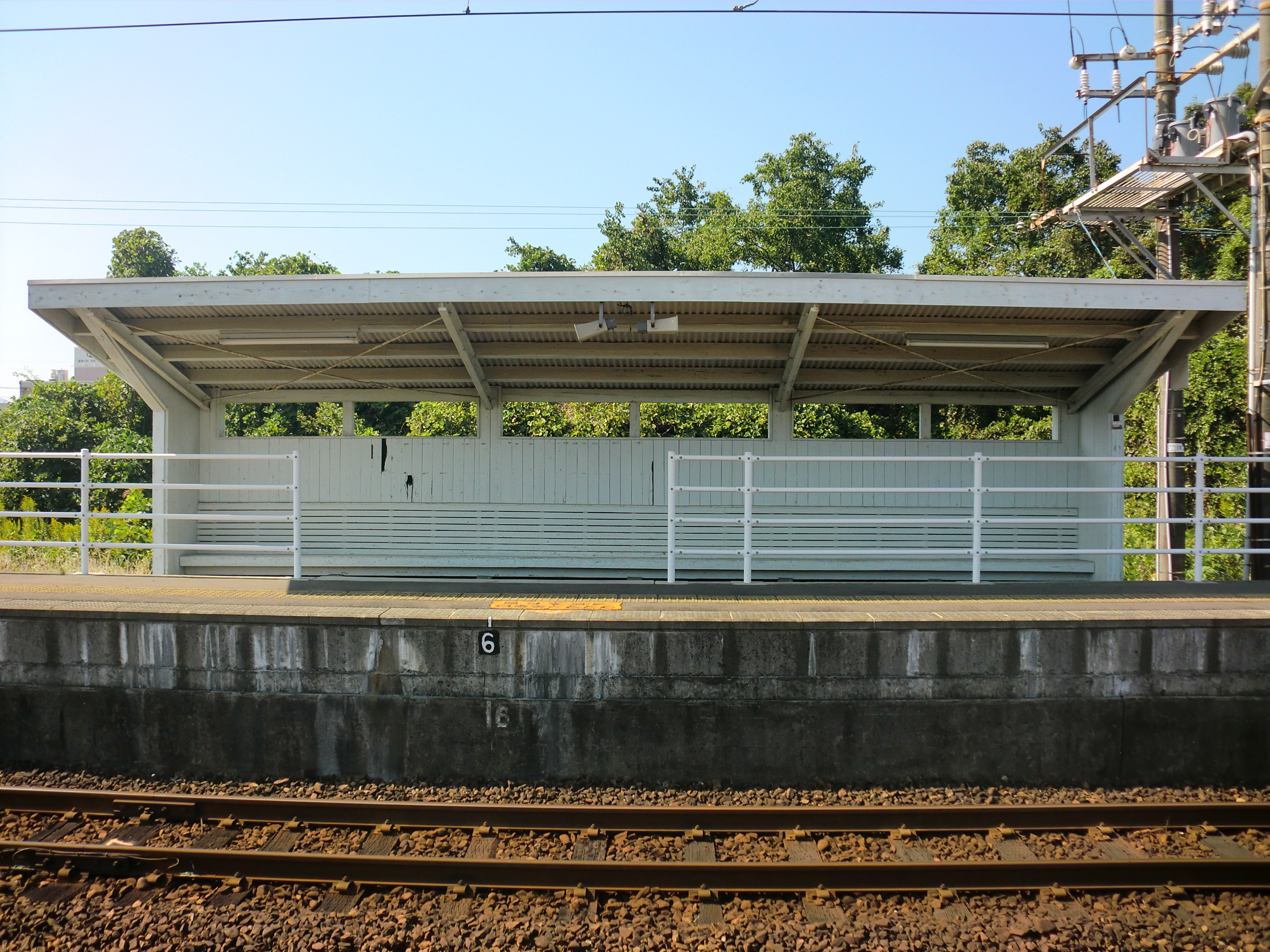
Platform shelter

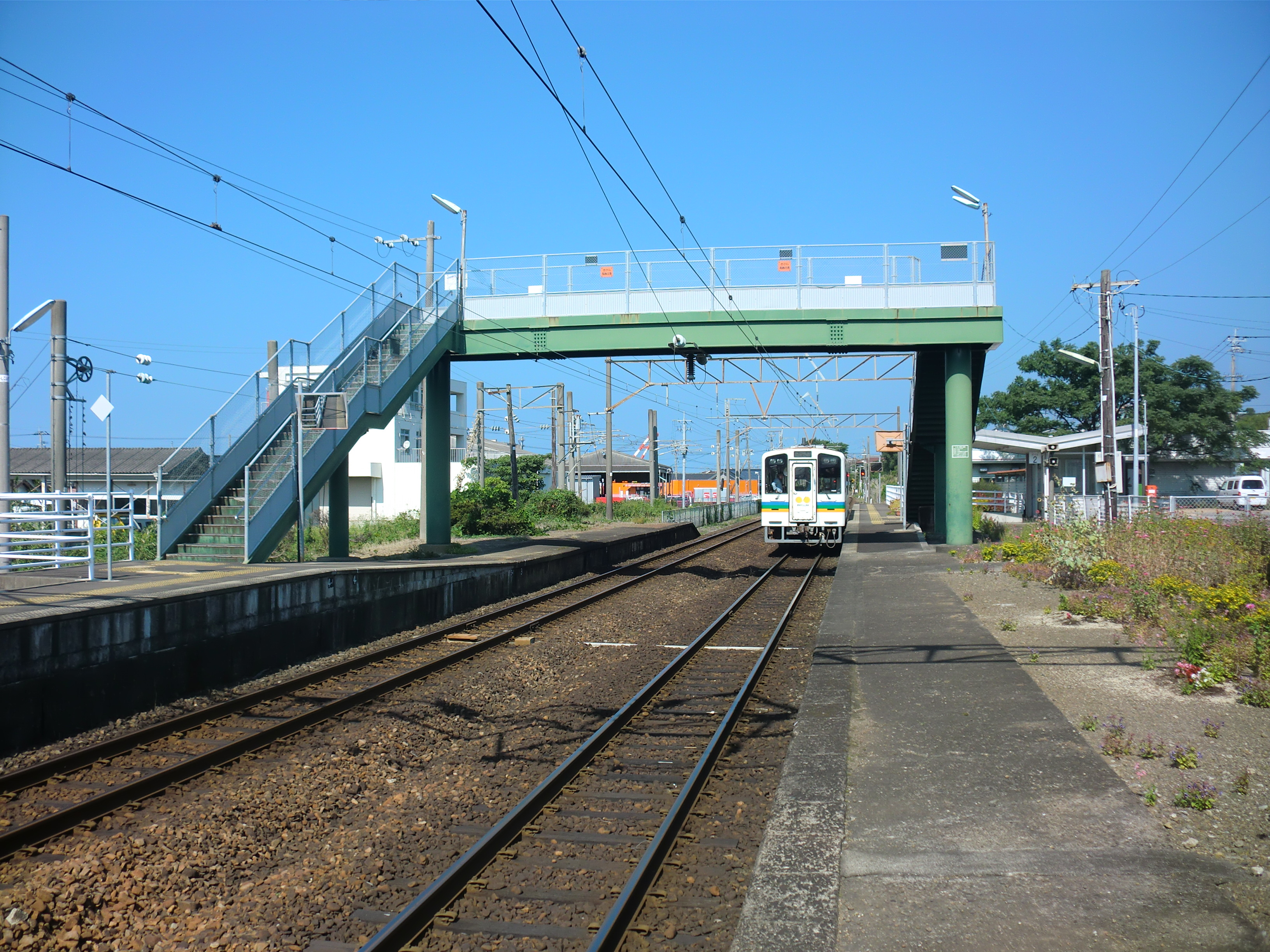
View of platform with approaching 100 series train

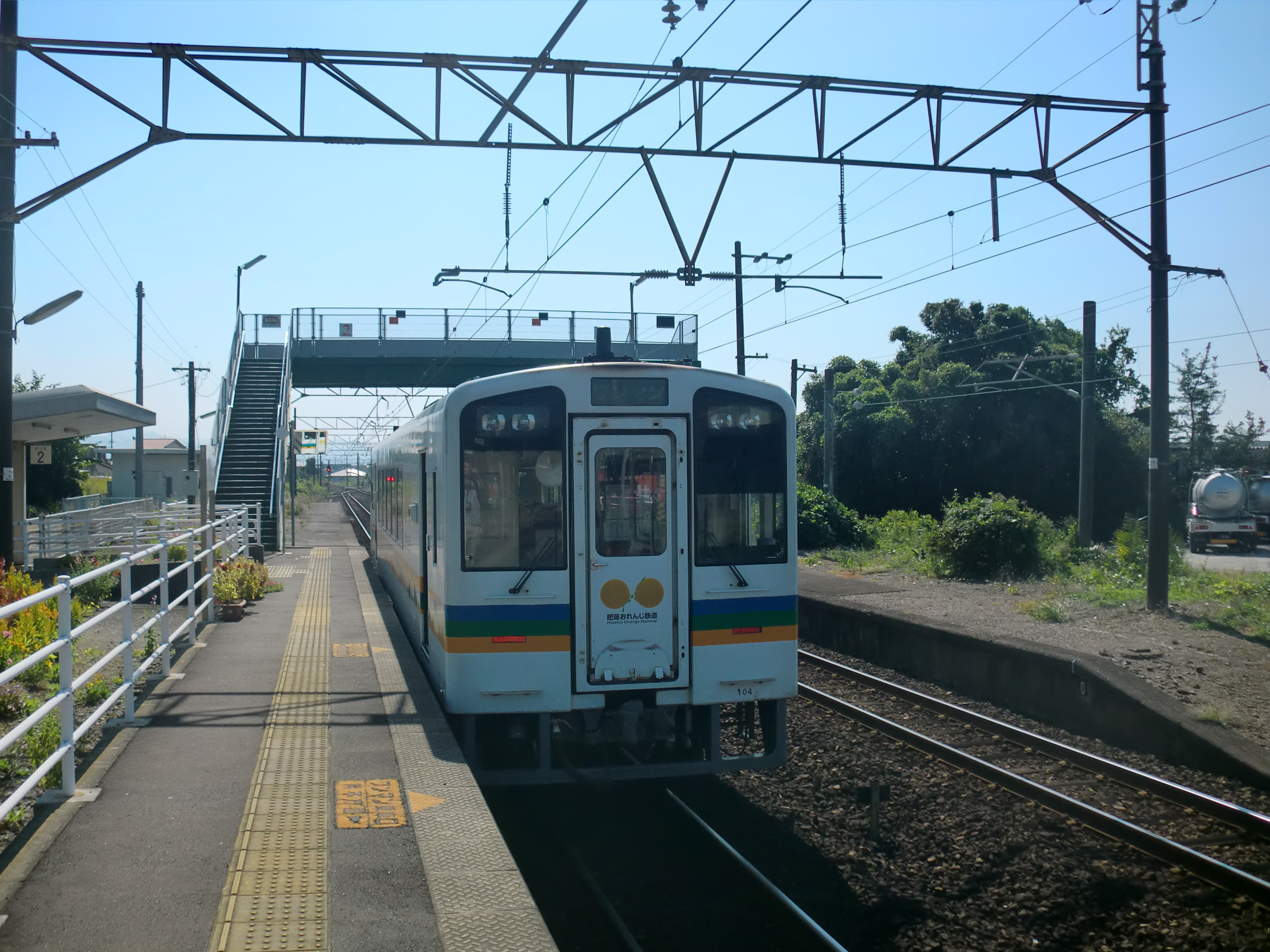
100 series train waiting at platform

== Adjacent stations ==
«	Service	»
Hisatsu Orange Railway Line
Fukuro	–	Izumi
Rapid Express Super Orange: Does not stop at this station

== History ==
Komenotsu Station was opened on 15 October 1923 as a station on the Japanese Government Railways Sendai Line, which was incorporated into the Kagoshima Main Line on 17 October 1927. With the privatization of the Japan National Railways on 1 April 1987, the station was transferred to JR Kyushu. On 13 March 2004, with the opening of the Kyushu Shinkansen, the station was transferred to the Hisatsu Orange Railway.

== Passenger statistics ==
The average daily passenger traffic in fiscal 2019 was 205 people.

== Surrounding area ==
- Yonetsu Port
- Izumi City Yonetsu East Elementary School

== See also ==
- List of railway stations in Japan
