= Kōda ware =

Type of Japanese pottery

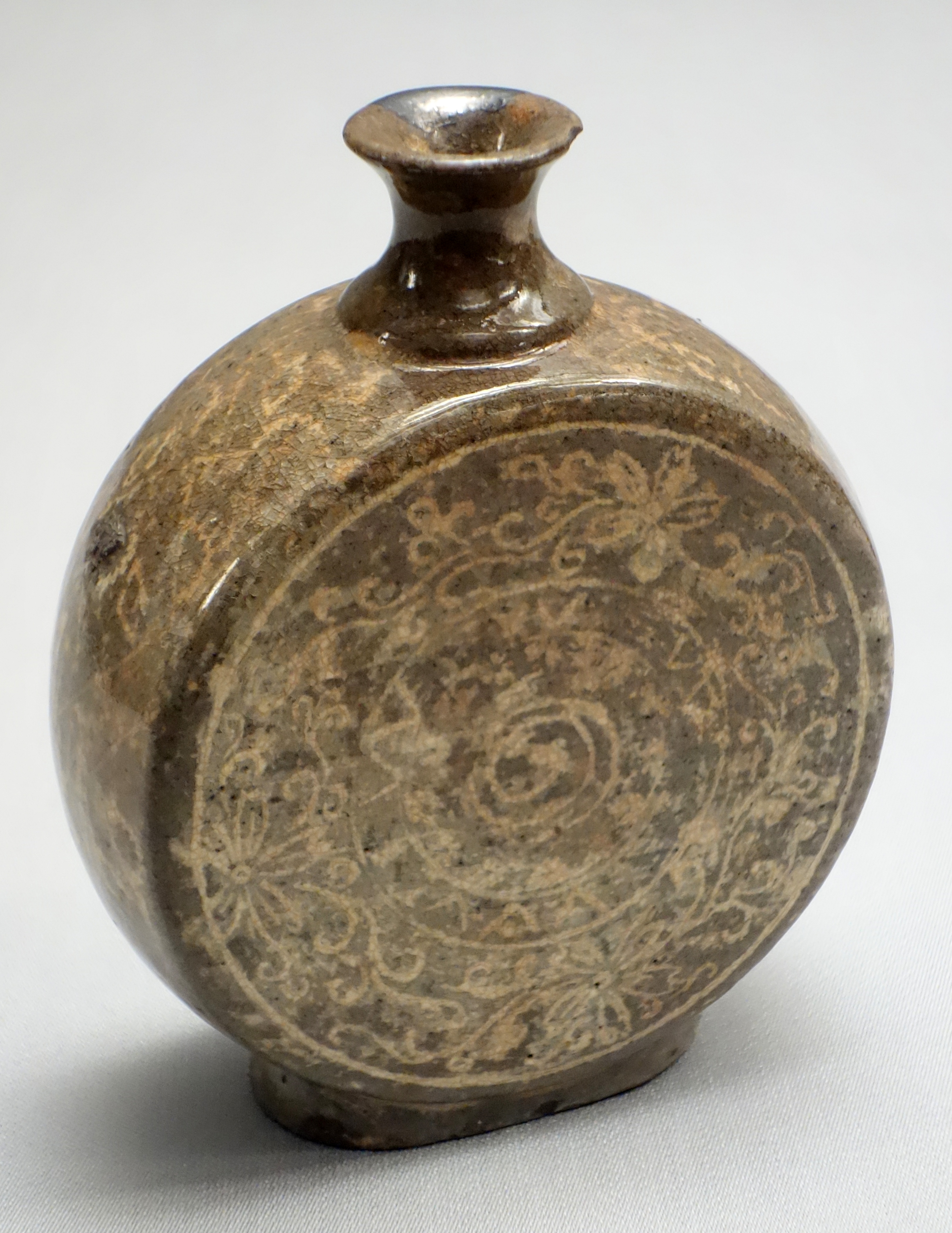
Yatsushiro ware flask-shaped vase, chrysanthemum design in inlay, Edo period, 18th century

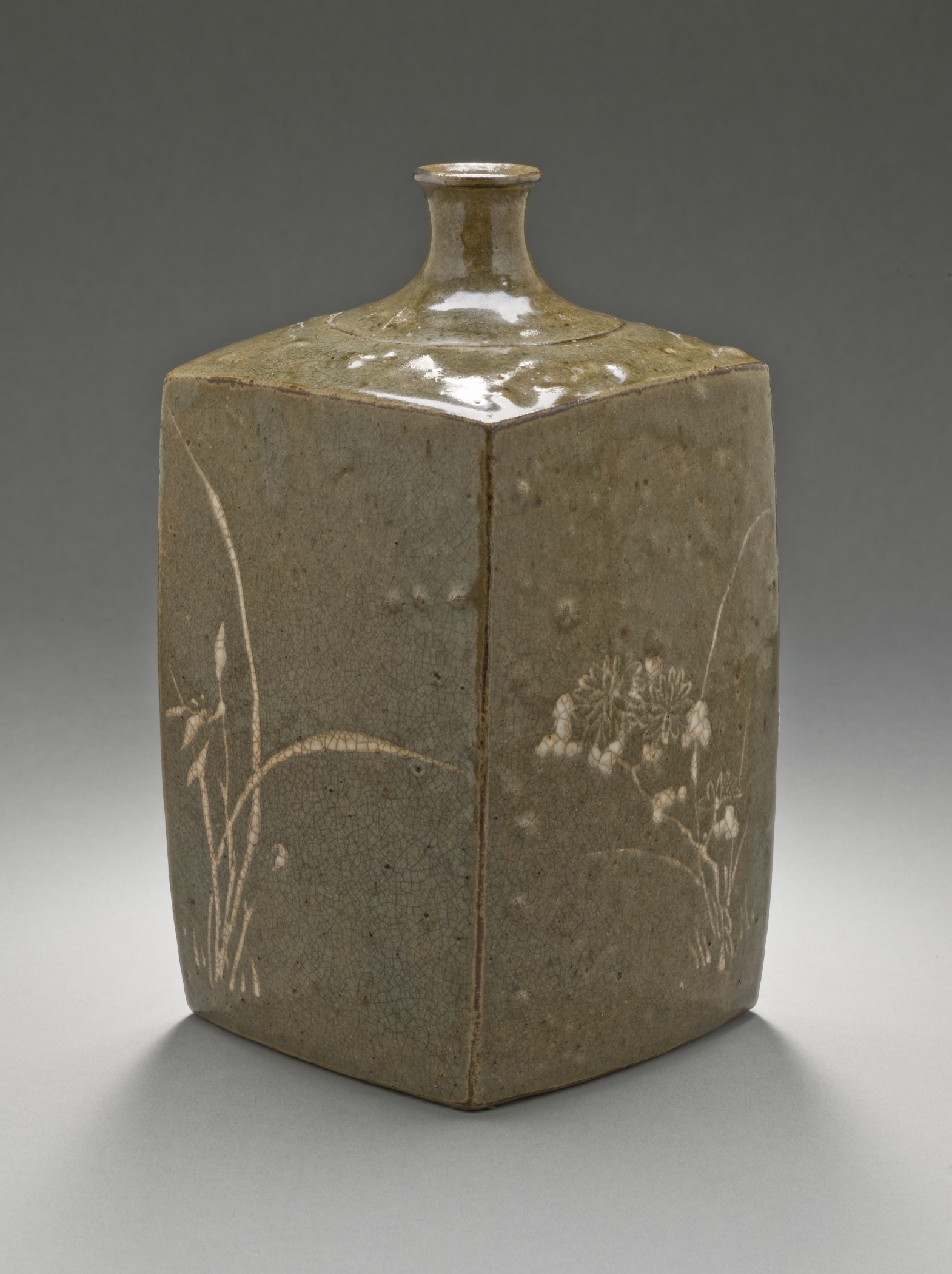
Kōda stoneware squared sake bottle with glaze and white slip floral designs decoration, Edo period, late 18th-early 19th century

Kōda ware (高田焼, Kōda-yaki) is a type of Japanese pottery with damascening traditionally from Yatsushiro, Kumamoto prefecture. It is also known as Yatsushiro ware (八代焼, Yatsushiro-yaki).

Most of the decorative style is influenced by Goryeo ware.

The Hirayama Kiln Site (平山窯跡) is inscribed in the list of Historic Sites of Japan (Kumamoto).

== History ==
Kōda ware is believed to have originated with the relocation of Hosokawa Mitsunao from Buzen Province to Higo Province (present-day Kumamoto) in 1632, which included moving potters who had produced Agano ware. However, it is more likely that Kōda ware production began before the arrival of the Hosokawas under the Kaga clan, who ruled Higo prior to their arrival.

The best-known Kōda ware was produced under the supervision of the Korean potter Sonkai, around 1658.
