= Haruto Kō =

Japanese poet and novelist

- 耕 治人
- Born: August 1, 1906; Yatsushiro, Kumamoto
- Died: January 6, 1988 (aged 81)
- Education: Meiji Gakuin University
- Occupations: Poet and novelist
- Writing career
- Notable awards: 1969 Yomiuri Prize, Ministry of Education's Art Encouragement Prize

Haruto Kō (耕 治人, Kō Haruto; August 1, 1906 – January 6, 1988) was a noted Japanese poet and novelist.

Kō was born in Yatsushiro, Kumamoto and graduated from the Department of English Literature of Meiji Gakuin University. He was arrested as a political offender during World War II, and after the war started to write I novels. Kō received the 1969 Yomiuri Prize for Ichijō no hikari, as well as the Ministry of Education's Art Encouragement Prize.

== English translations ==
- "Black Market Blues", in Murder in Japan: Japanese Stories of Crime and Detection, John L. Apostolou and Martin Harry Greenberg, editors, New York: Dembner Books, 1987. ISBN 978-0-934878-87-6.

== Sources ==
- Yoshikazu Kataoka, Introduction to Contemporary Japanese Literature: 1956-1970, Kokusai Bunka Shinkōkai, 1972, page 107.
- J-Pitch article
