= Kamase Station =

Railway station in Yatsushiro, Kumamoto Prefecture, Japan

Kamase Station 鎌瀬駅
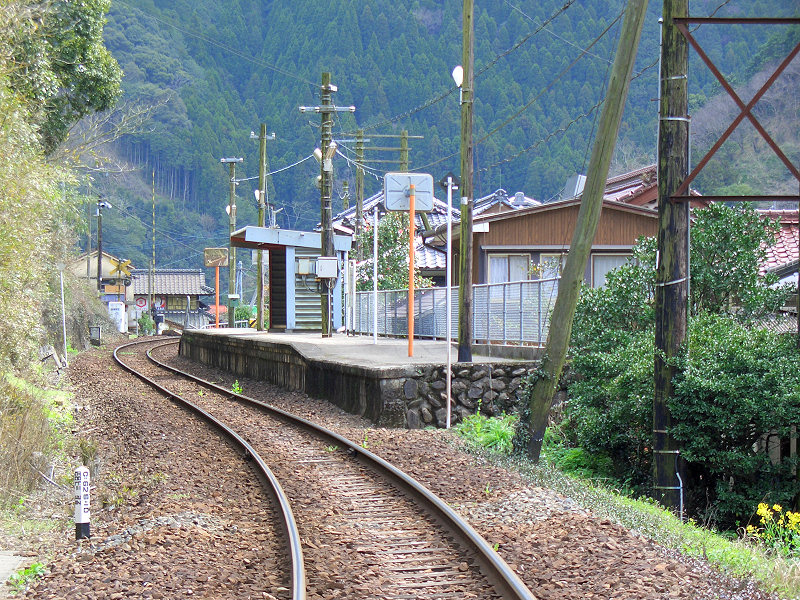
- Kamase Station in March 2007

General information
- Location: Yatsushiro, Kumamoto, Japan
- Coordinates: 32°23′28″N 130°39′17″E
- Operator: JR Kyushu
- Line: ■ Hisatsu Line

Other information
- Website: Official website
Location
- Location within Japan

Kamase Station (鎌瀬駅, Kamase-eki) is a railway station on the Hisatsu Line in Yatsushiro, Kumamoto, Japan, operated by Kyushu Railway Company (JR Kyushu).

== Lines ==
Kamase Station is served by the Hisatsu Line.

== Adjacent stations ==
←	Service	→
Hisatsu Line
Haki	Local	Setoishi

== See also ==
- List of railway stations in Japan
