= Setoishi Station =

Railway station in Yatsushiro, Kumamoto Prefecture, Japan

Setoishi Station 瀬戸石駅
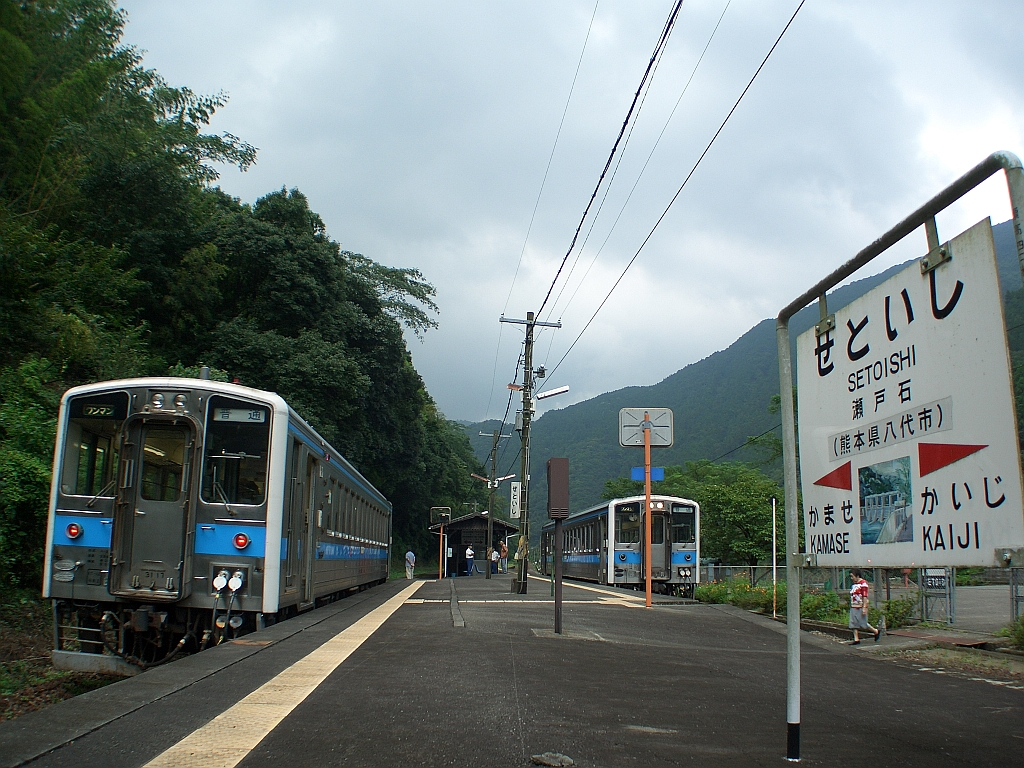
- Setoishi Station in August 2006

General information
- Location: Japan
- Coordinates: 32°22′18″N 130°38′46″E
- Operator: JR Kyushu
- Line: ■ Hisatsu Line

Other information
- Website: Official website
Location
- Location within Japan

Setoishi Station (瀬戸石駅, Setoishi-eki) is a railway station on the Hisatsu Line in Yatsushiro, Kumamoto, Japan, operated by Kyushu Railway Company (JR Kyushu).

== Lines ==
Setoishi Station is served by the Hisatsu Line.

== Adjacent stations ==
←	Service	→
Hisatsu Line
Kamase	Local	Kaiji

== See also ==
- List of railway stations in Japan
