= Banpeiyu =

Citrus fruit

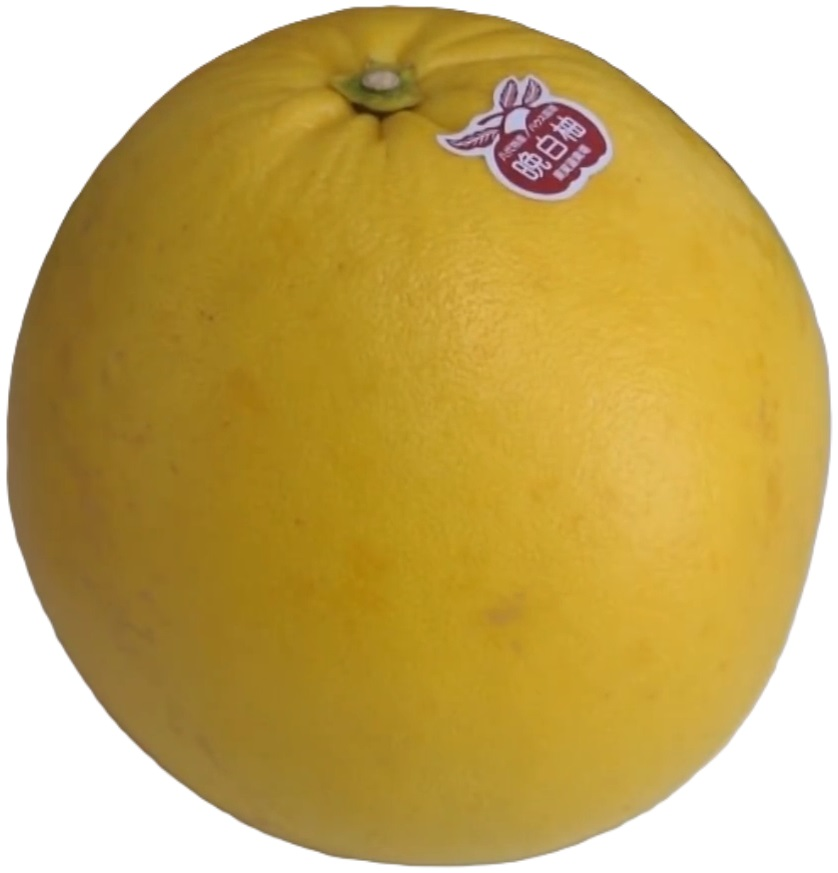
- Genus: Citrus
- Species: Citrus maxima (Burm.) Merr.
- Origin: Japan

Banpeiyu (Japanese: 晩白柚) is a cultivar of pomelo which produces extremely large fruits.

A banpeiyu fruit became the world's heaviest pomelo when it was presented by Seiji Sonoda from Japan for the Guinness World Record at the Banpeiyu Competition in Yatsushiro, Kumamoto, Japan on December 25, 2014. This specimen weighed 4.8597 kg (10 lb 11.3 oz) with a circumference of 83.5 cm (32.8 in).

The fruit of the banpeiyu is very popular in Japan for eating fresh, due to its blend of mild acidity and pleasant sweetness. It is also used in the production of fruit jelly.

== Origin and names ==
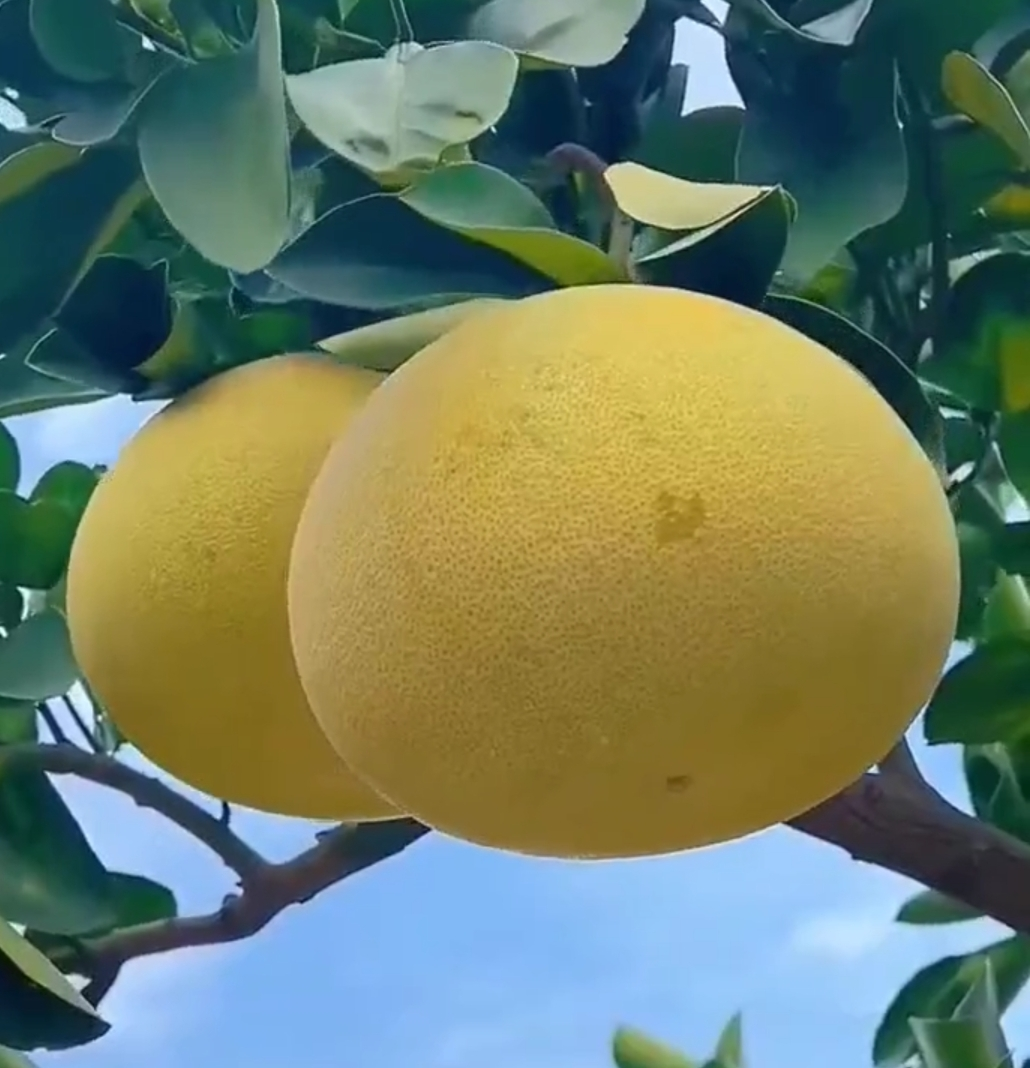

Banpeiyu is mostly known today as a Japanese citrus and is ranked as the most popular pomelo cultivar in Japan, producing high quality fruits in the hottest regions of the country. Nevertheless, it is assumed to be of unknown, possibly Malayan origin, and arrived in Japan via Taiwan where it was introduced in 1920, and is sometimes referred to as a Taiwan pomelo. It also has many other names, which are similar in pronunciation to pay you.

== Description ==
The tree is large and of vigorous growth. New buds are hairy, as are the underside of the leaves. The fruit is very large and nearly spherical, with a thick pith which is pale yellow and smooth. Juice vesicles are likewise pale yellow, firm but tender and juicy, with an excellent balanced flavour between sweet and tart, separated into 15–18 segments with thin but tough walls. The fruit is harvested during medium to late season and keeps fresh for several months.

== In Japanese culture ==
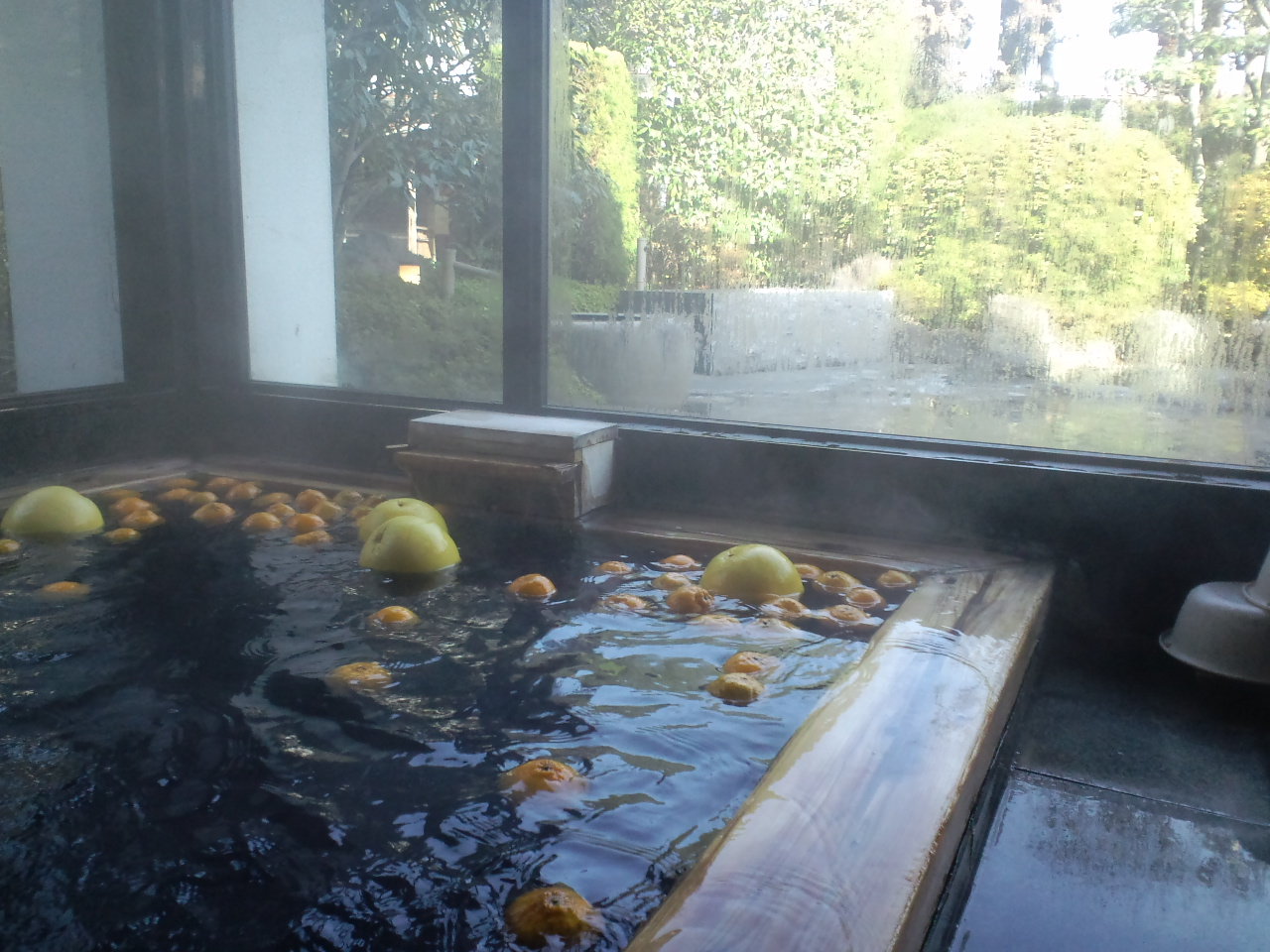
Banpeiyu and different citrus in a bathtub at Yatsushiro, Kumamoto, Japan.

In Japan, whole banpeiyu and other citrus fruits are placed in bathtubs for aroma and used as a remedy for colds. There is a bathhouse in Yatsushiro, Kumamoto, Japan, that is named "Banpeiyu" after the fruit.
