= Nakakyushu Junior College =

Higher education institution in Kumamoto Prefecture, Japan

Coordinates: 32°28′37″N 130°36′31″E

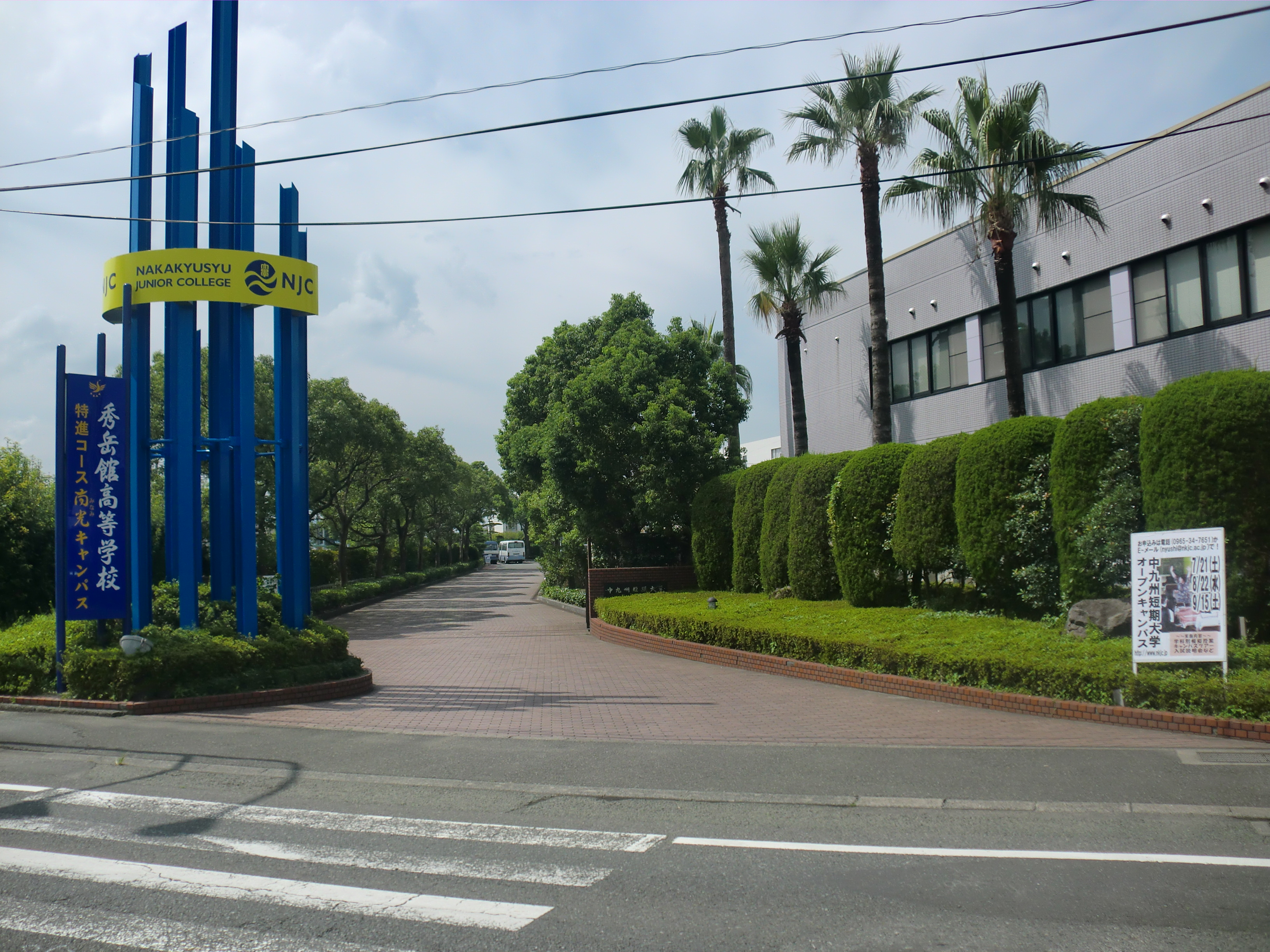

Nakakyushu Junior College (中九州短期大学, Nakakyūshū tanki daigaku) is a private junior college in Yatsushiro, Kumamoto, Japan, established in 1974.
