= Dan Station =

Railway station in Yatsushiro, Kumamoto Prefecture, Japan

Dan Station 段駅
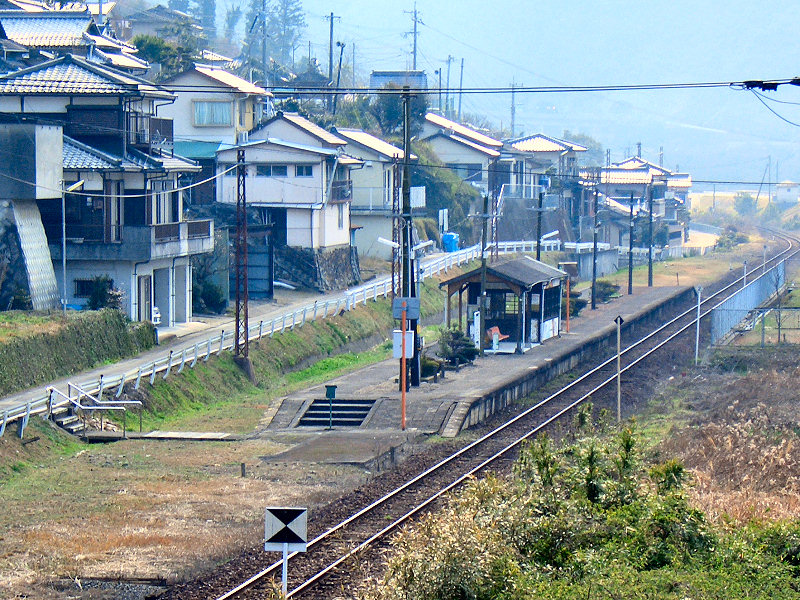
- Dan Station in February 2007

General information
- Location: Japan
- Coordinates: 32°28′05″N 130°38′45″E
- Operator: JR Kyushu
- Line: ■ Hisatsu Line

Other information
- Website: Official website
Location
- Location within Japan

Dan Station (段駅, Dan-eki) is a railway station on the Hisatsu Line in Yatsushiro, Kumamoto, Japan, operated by Kyushu Railway Company (JR Kyushu).

== History ==
- September 11, 1929 (Showa 4): Mayors of nearby towns and villages applied to the Moji Railway Bureau for permission to establish an intermediate station between Yatsushiro and Sakamoto stations.
- October 29, 1930 (Showa 5): Approval issued by the Ministry of Railways.
- April 1, 1931 : Opened by the Ministry of Railways. No station staff was assigned.
- April 1, 1940 (Showa 15): Station staff assigned.
- 1956 (Showa 31)
  - July 20th : Construction of the northbound main line is completed.
  - This year: A stationmaster was appointed and the station was separated from the jurisdiction of Yatsushiro Station.
- 1977 (Showa 52): The station building was rebuilt.
- February 1, 1984 : Baggage handling discontinued.
- November 1,1986: The station became unstaffed due to the introduction electronic block devices. The outbound track was removed from the station.
- April 1, 1987: Kyushu Railway Company takes over after privatization of Japanese National Railways .
- January 1, 1988 (Showa 63): The station building was removed.

== Structure and lines ==
Dan Station is served by the Hisatsu Line. The station has one platform serving a two-way track. It used to have one island platform and two tracks, but one of the tracks was removed. The station building has been removed, and access to the outside is via the edge of the platform, across the remains of the old tracks, where the station building once stood. Currently, it is an unstaffed station with only a wooden waiting room on the platform.

== Surroundings ==
There are relatively many houses, and settlements are located on both sides of the Kuma River. On the opposite side of the river is the Sanko Bus Saibu Ohashi bus stop, about 500 meters away from the station.

- Kumamoto Prefectural Route 158, Nakatsu Road, Yatsushiro Line, runs in front of the station.
- Kudamatsu Guma Simple Post Office
- Kuma River
- Western Bridge
- Kyushu Expressway
- National Route 219 - Running on the opposite bank.
- Former Shinsui Power Station - A brick building can be seen for a moment from the train window between this station and Sakamoto Station. It can be seen on the right just after leaving the station and exiting the second tunnel.

== Adjacent stations ==
←	Service	→
Hisatsu Line
Yatsushiro	Local	Sakamoto

== See also ==
- List of railway stations in Japan
