= Higo Kouda Station =

Railway station in Yatsushiro, Kumamoto Prefecture, Japan

Higo Kouda Station (Note: The official Hisatsu Orange Railway site, platform signage, and station guides list the romanised spelling as Hiko Kōda, though Higo Kouda and Higokoda are also common usage.) 肥後高田駅
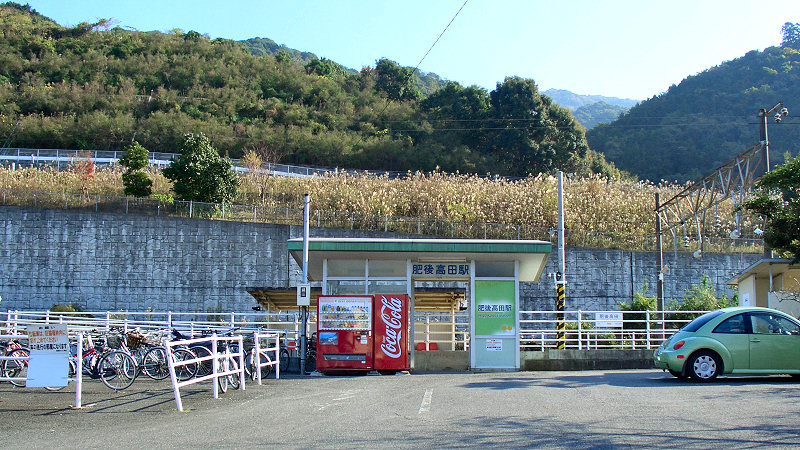
- Higo-Kōda Station in 2006

General information
- Location: Naragimachi, Yatsushiro-shi, Kumamoto-ken 866-0064; Japan
- Coordinates: 32.4752680°N 130.6124856°E
- Operator: Hisatsu Orange Railway Co., Ltd.
- Line: Hisatsu Orange Railway
- Distance: 4.8 km from Yatsushiro; 4.8 km from Yatsushiro
- Platforms: 2 side platforms
- Tracks: 2

Construction
- Structure type: At-grade

Other information
- Station code: OR02
- Website: Official (in Japanese)

History
- Opened: 17 July 1933
Location
- Location within Kumamoto Prefecture Location within Japan

Higo Kouda Station (肥後高田駅, Higo-Kōda-eki) is a passenger railway station in the city of Yatsushiro, Kumamoto Prefecture, Japan. It is served by the third-sector railway company Hisatsu Orange Railway

== Lines ==
The station is served by the Hisatsu Orange Railway Line that follows the former coastal route of the JR Kyushu Kagoshima Main Line connecting Yatsushiro and Sendai. It is located 4.8 km from the starting point of the line at Yatsushiro.

== Station layout ==
The station consists of two opposed side platforms at grade, connected by a footbridge. The station is unattended.

=== Platforms ===
1	■ ■ Hisatsu Orange Railway	for Yatsushiro and Shin-Yatsushiro
2	■ ■ Hisatsu Orange Railway	for Yatsushiro and Shin-Yatsushiro for Minamata and Izumi

== Gallery ==
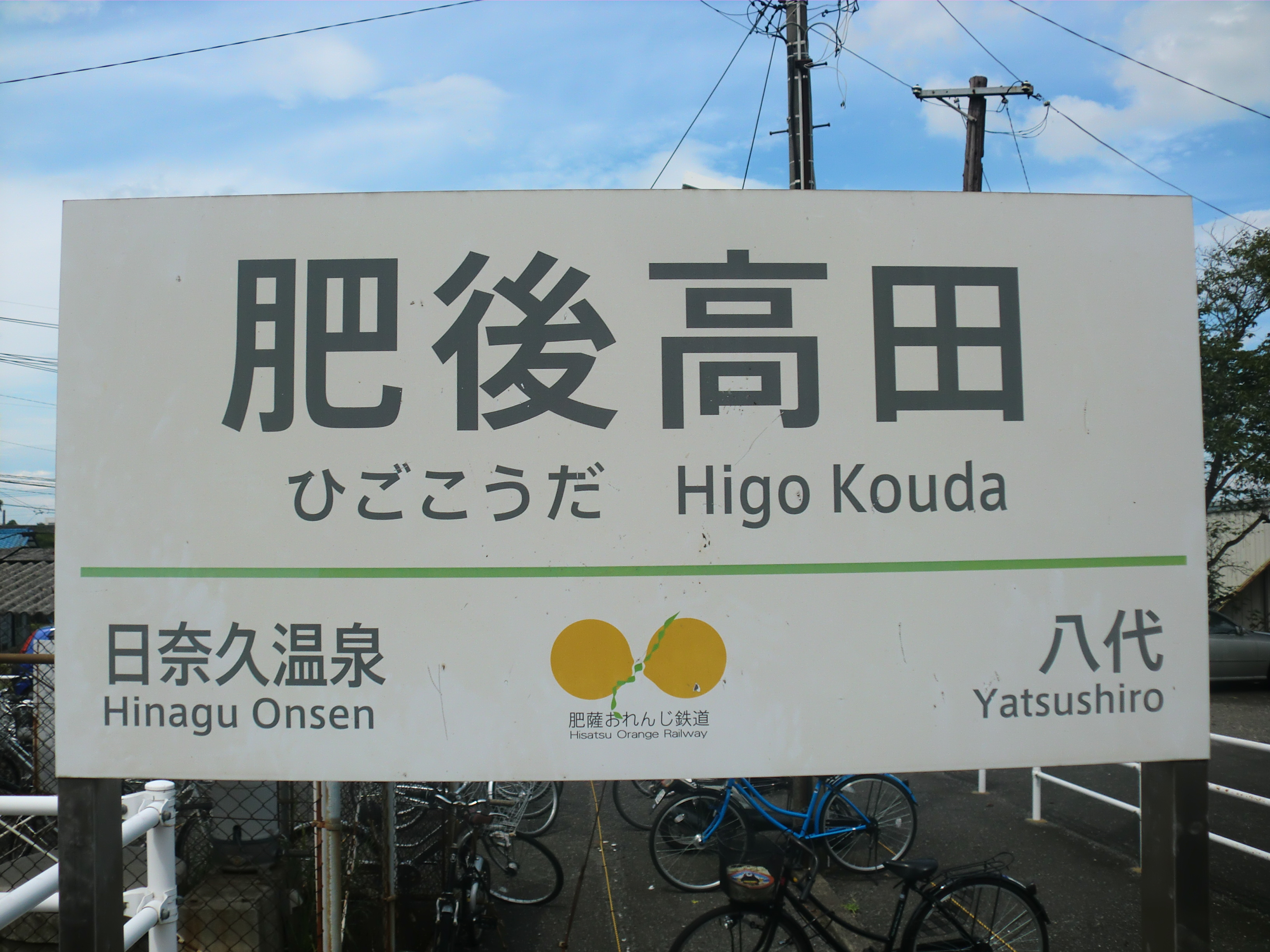
Station sign

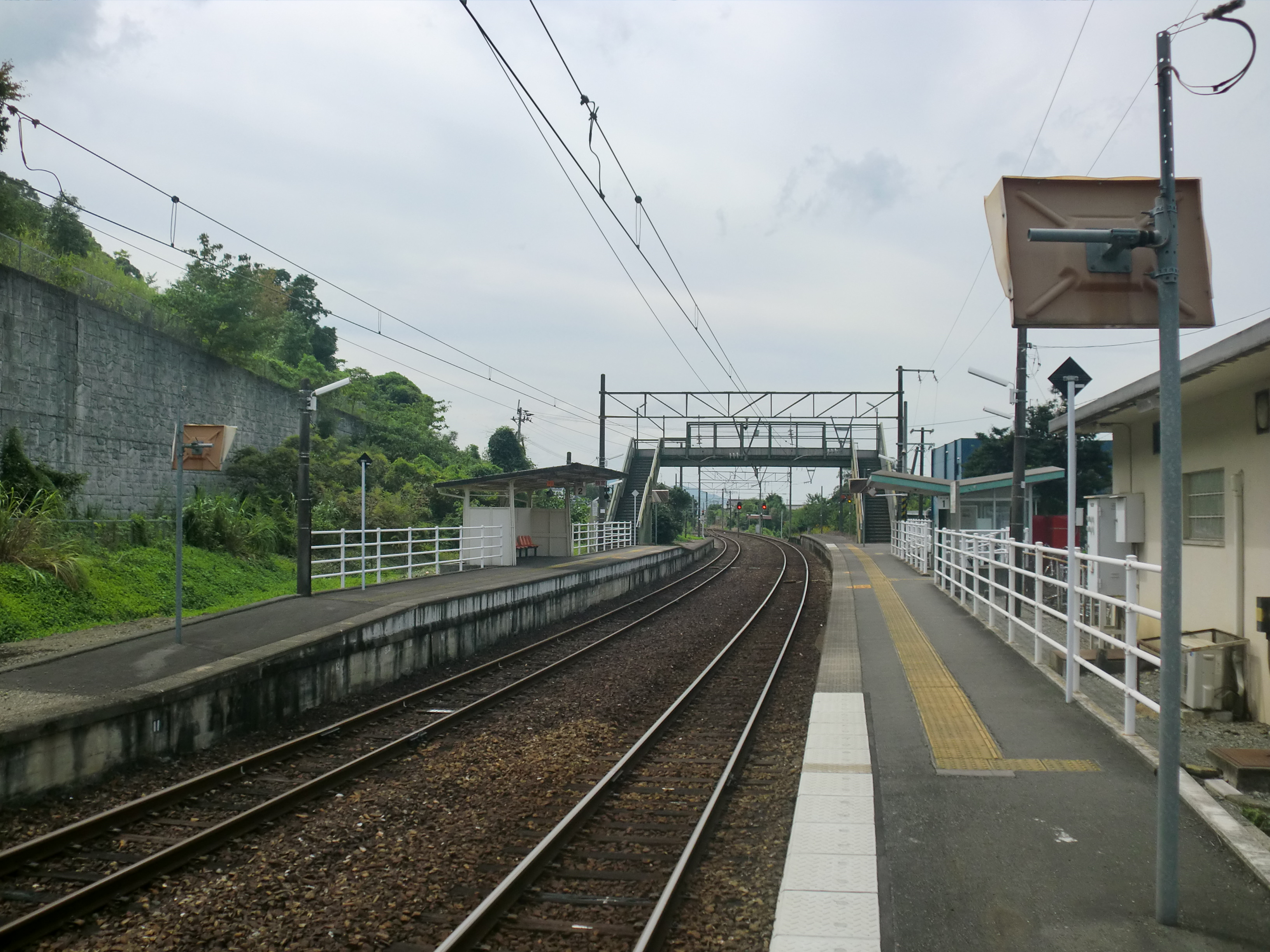
View of station platforms

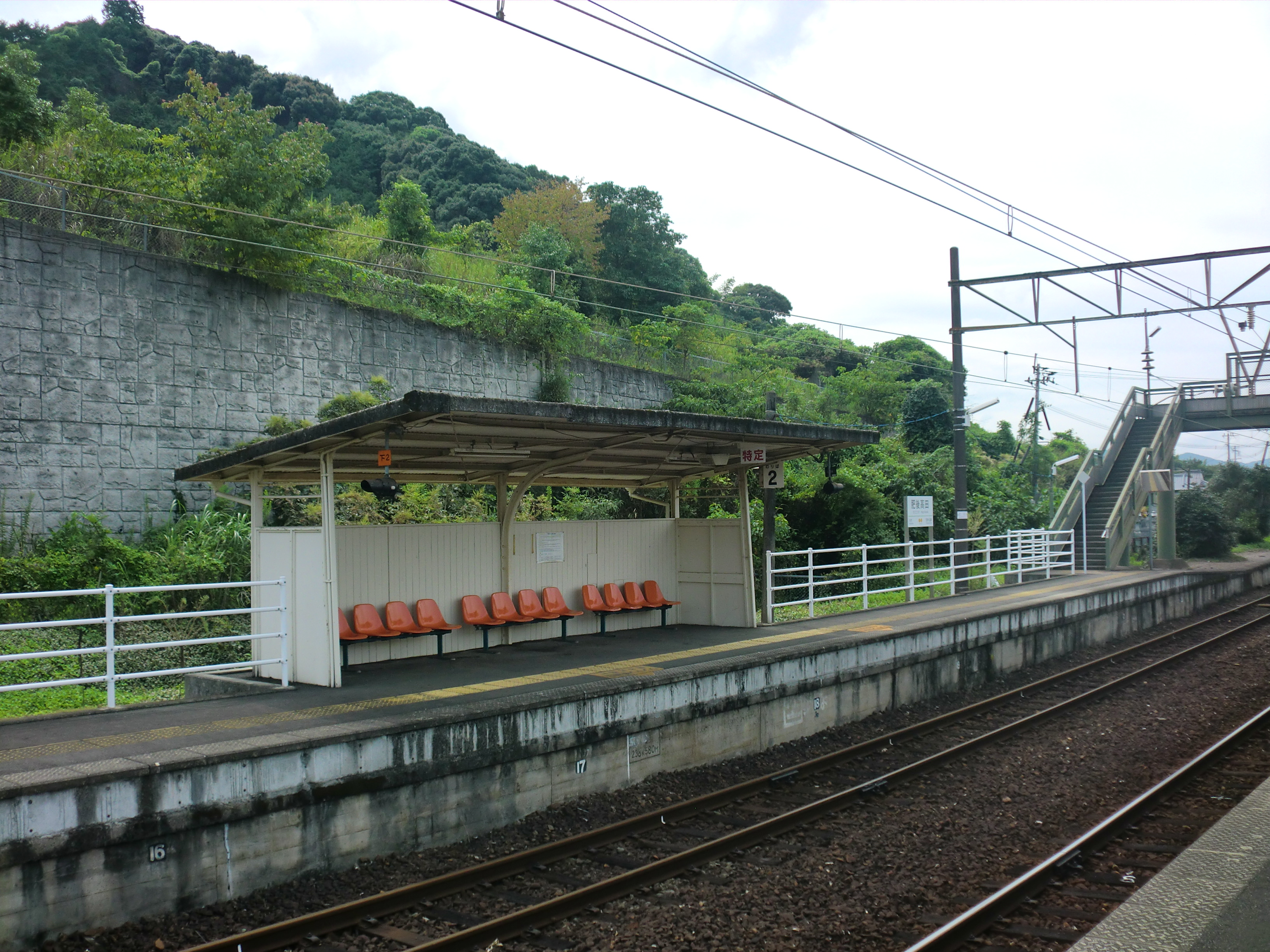
Platform shelter

== Adjacent stations ==
«	Service	»
Hisatsu Orange Railway Line
Yatsushiro	Local	Hinagu Onsen
Rapid Express Super Orange: Does not stop at this station

== History ==
Higo Kouda Station was opened on 17 July 1933 as a station on the Japanese Government Railways Kagoshima Main Line. With the privatization of the Japan National Railways on 1 April 1987, the station was transferred to JR Kyushu. On 13 March 2004, with the opening of the Kyushu Shinkansen, the station was transferred to the Hisatsu Orange Railway. On 1 October 2019 the station name sign was updated with the introduction of station numbering. The English name was changed from "Higo Kouda" to "Higo-Kōda."

== Passenger statistics ==
The average daily passenger traffic in fiscal 2019 was 470 passengers.

== Surrounding area ==
- Nakakyushu Junior College
- Kumamoto National College of Technology Yatsushiro Campus
- Kumamoto Prefectural Yatsushiro Technical High School

== See also ==
- List of railway stations in Japan
