= Kaiji Station =

Railway station in Ashikita, Kumamoto Prefecture, Japan

Kaiji Station 海路駅
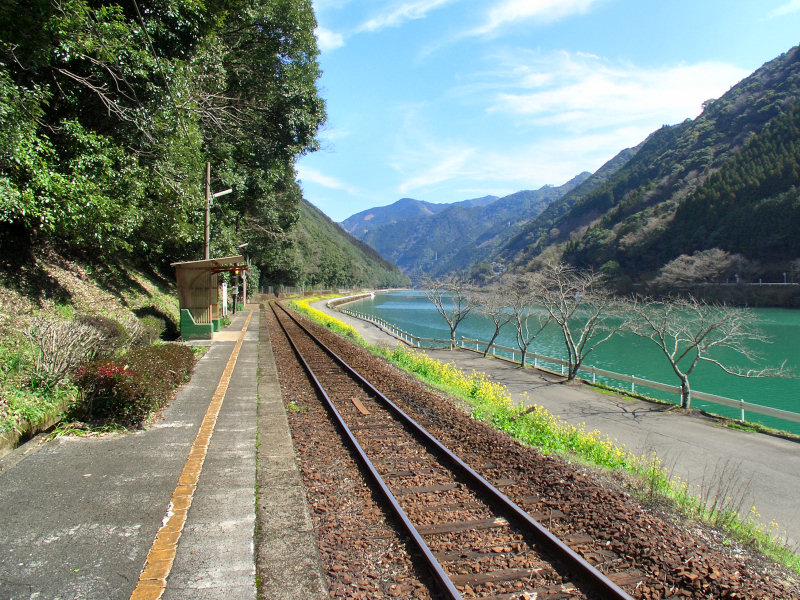
- Kaiji Station in March 2007

General information
- Location: Japan
- Coordinates: 32°20′58″N 130°37′09″E
- Operator: JR Kyushu
- Line: ■ Hisatsu Line

Other information
- Website: Official website
Location
- Location within Japan

Kaiji Station (海路駅, Kaiji-eki) is a railway station on the Hisatsu Line in Ashikita, Kumamoto, Japan, operated by Kyushu Railway Company (JR Kyushu).

== Lines ==
Kaiji Station is served by the Hisatsu Line.

There is no ticket counter at the station.

== Layout ==
The station has a single side platform serving one bi-directional track.

== Adjacent stations ==
←	Service	→
Hisatsu Line
Setoishi	Local	Yoshio

== See also ==
- List of railway stations in Japan
