= Haki Station =

Railway station in Yatsushiro, Kumamoto Prefecture, Japan

Haki Station 葉木駅
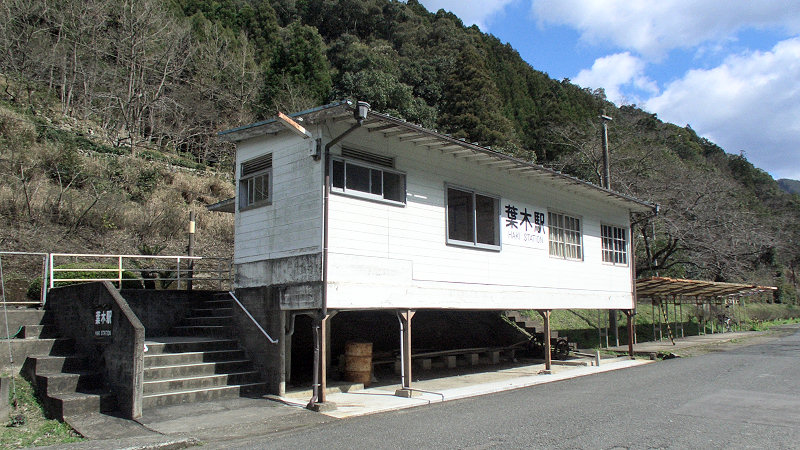
- Haki Station in March 2007

General information
- Location: Yatsushiro, Kumamoto, Japan
- Coordinates: 32°24′37″N 130°38′43″E
- Operator: JR Kyushu
- Line: ■ Hisatsu Line

Other information
- Website: Official website
Location
- Location within Japan

Haki Station (葉木駅, Haki-eki) is a railway station on the Hisatsu Line in Yatsushiro, Kumamoto, Japan, operated by Kyushu Railway Company (JR Kyushu). "Haki" means "Ambition" in Japanese.

== Lines ==
Haki Station is served by the Hisatsu Line.

== Adjacent stations ==
←	Service	→
Hisatsu Line
Sakamoto	Local	Kamase

== See also ==
- List of railway stations in Japan
