= Higo Futami Station =

Railway station in Yatsushiro, Kumamoto Prefecture, Japan

Higo-Futami Station 肥後二見駅
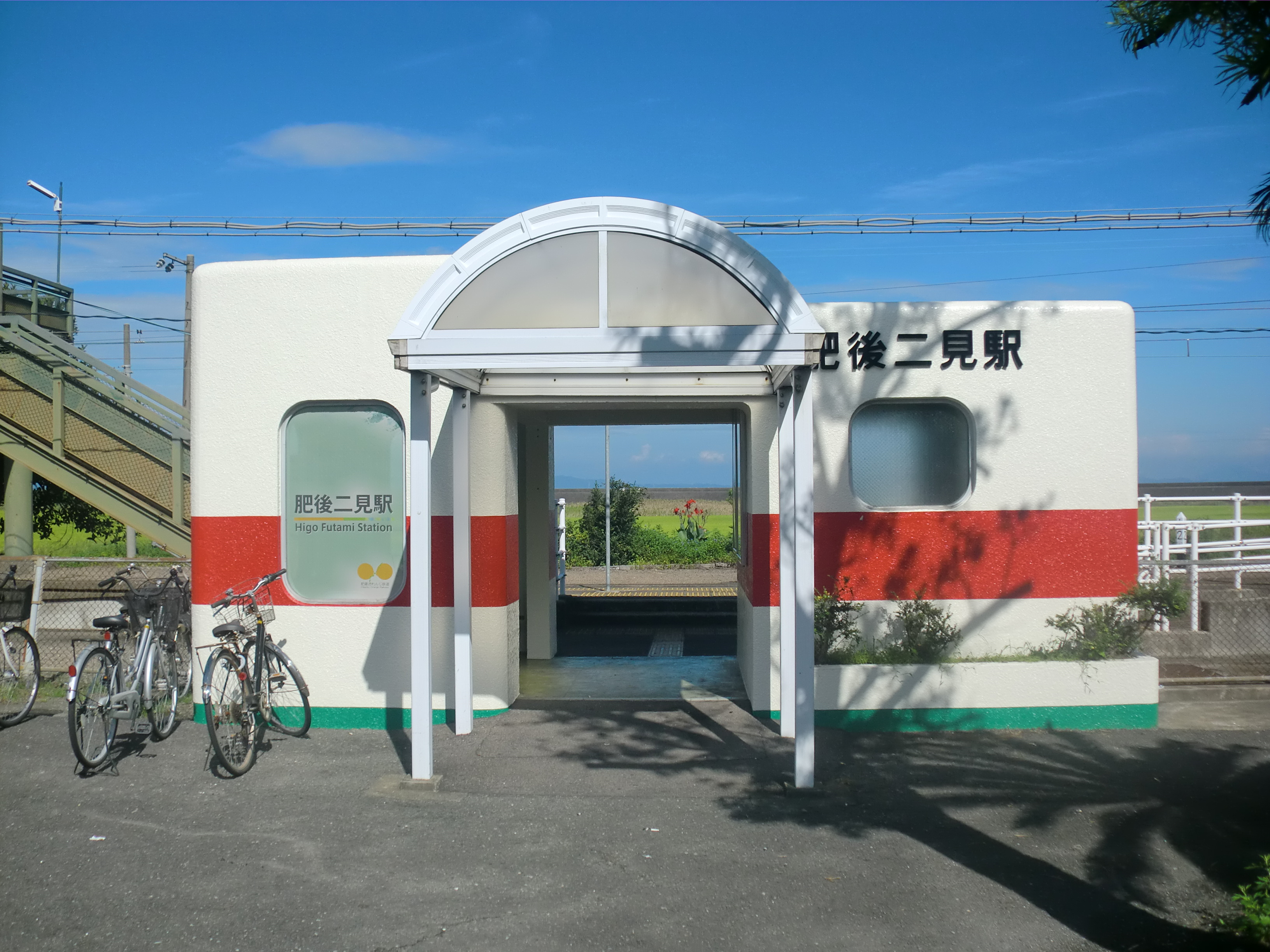
- Station building in 2006

General information
- Location: Futamisuguchimachi, Yatsushiro-shi, Kumamoto-ken 869-5171; Japan
- Coordinates: 32.4200201°N 130.5497033°E
- Operator: Hisatsu Orange Railway Co., Ltd.
- Line: Hisatsu Orange Railway
- Distance: 13.7 km from Yatsushiro; 3.6 km from Hinagu Onsen
- Platforms: 2 side platforms
- Tracks: 2

Construction
- Structure type: At-grade

Other information
- Station code: OR03
- Website: Official (in Japanese)

History
- Opened: 15 April 1925
- Original company: Japanese Government Railways
Location
- Location within Kumamoto Prefecture Location within Japan

Higo-Futami Station (肥後二見駅, Higo-Futami-eki) is a passenger railway station in the city of Yatsushiro, Kumamoto Prefecture, Japan. It is served by the third-sector railway company Hisatsu Orange Railway

== Lines ==
The station is served by the Hisatsu Orange Railway Line that follows the former coastal route of the JR Kyushu Kagoshima Main Line connecting Yatsushiro and Sendai. It is located 13.7 km from the starting point of the line at Yatsushiro.

== Station layout ==
The station consists of two opposed side platforms at street level, connected by a footbridge. The small station building has a similar design to Fukuro refurbished at the same time. Platform 1 services trains bound for Yatsushiro, platform 2 for trains to Sendai.

=== Platforms ===
| 1 | ■ ■ Hisatsu Orange Railway | for Minamata and Izumi |
| 2 | ■ ■ Hisatsu Orange Railway | for Yatsushiro and Shin-Yatsushiro |

== Gallery ==
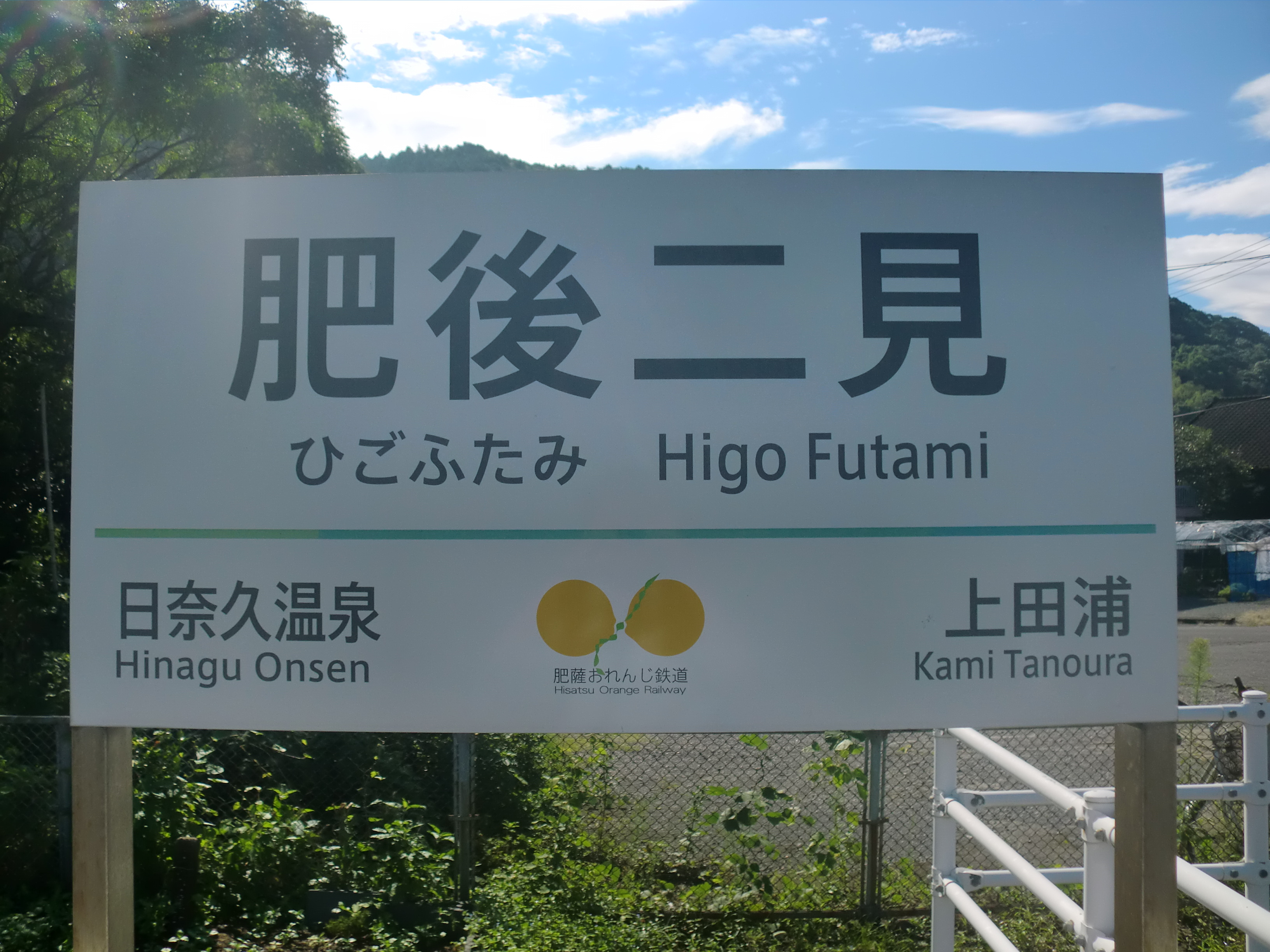
Station sign

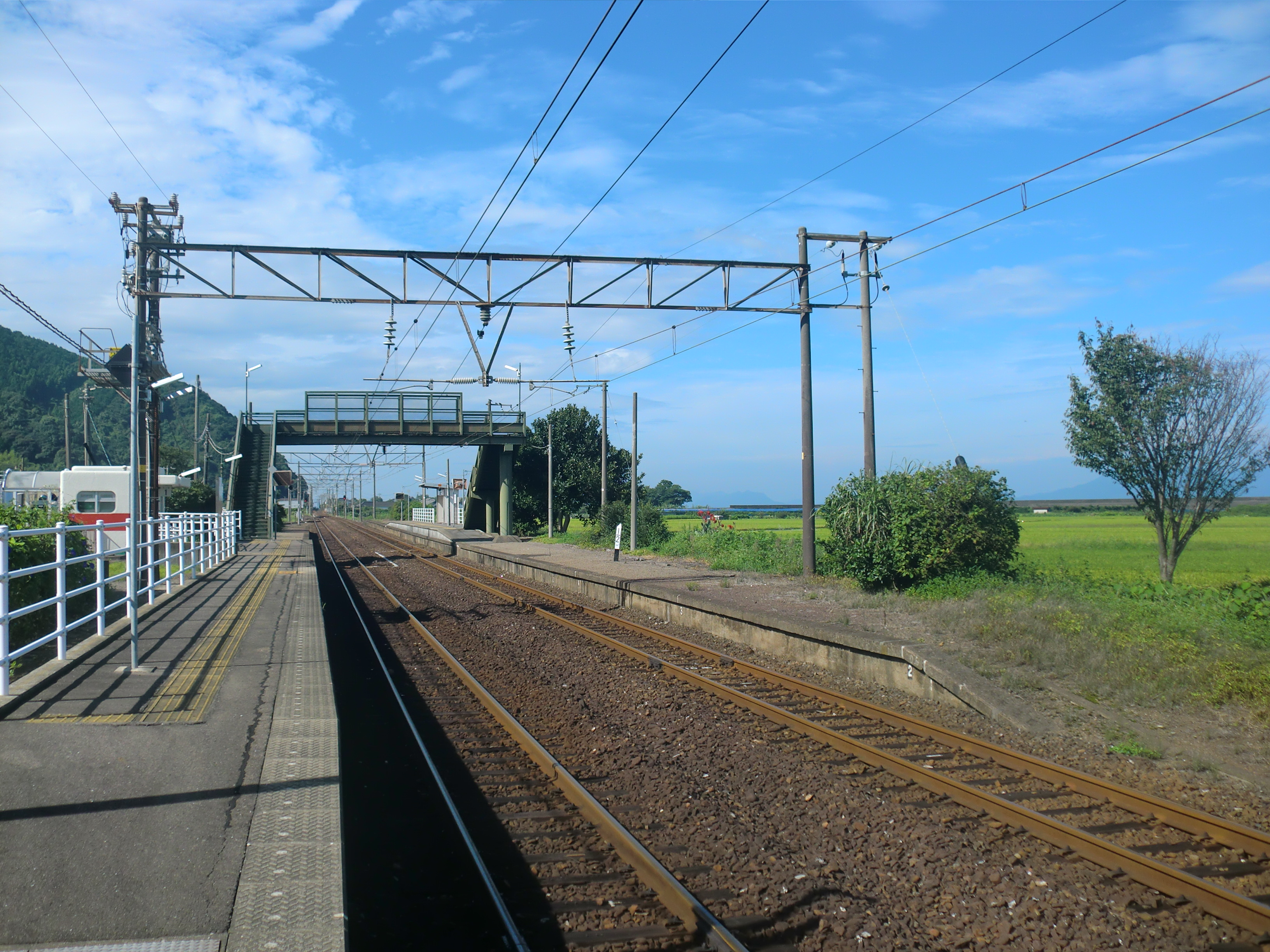
View of station platforms

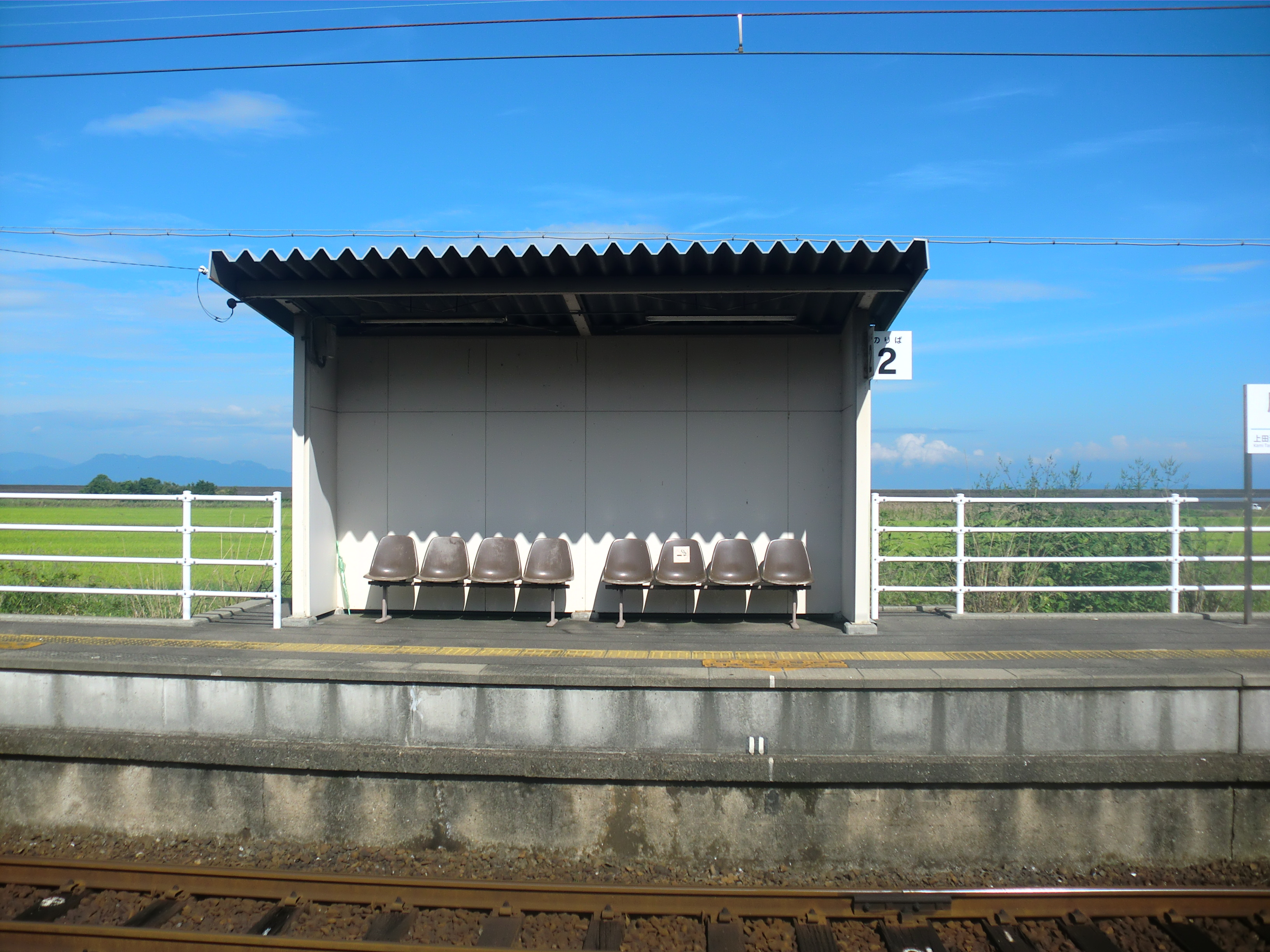
Platform shelter

== Adjacent stations ==
| « | Service | » |
Hisatsu Orange Railway Line
| Hinagu Onsen | – | Kami Tanoura |
Rapid Express Super Orange: Does not stop at this station

== History ==
Higo Futami Station was opened on 15 April 1925 as a station on the Japanese Government Railways Kagoshima Main Line. With the privatization of the Japan National Railways on 1 April 1987, the station was transferred to JR Kyushu. On 13 March 2004, with the opening of the Kyushu Shinkansen, the station was transferred to the Hisatsu Orange Railway. On 1 October 2019 the station name sign was updated with the introduction of station numbering.

== Passenger statistics ==
The average daily passenger traffic in fiscal 2019 was 59 passengers.

== Surrounding area ==
- Japan National Route 3
- Yatsushiro Sea

== See also ==
- List of railway stations in Japan
