= Hinagu Onsen Station =

Railway station in Yatsushiro, Kumamoto Prefecture, Japan

Hinagu-Onsen Station 日奈久温泉駅
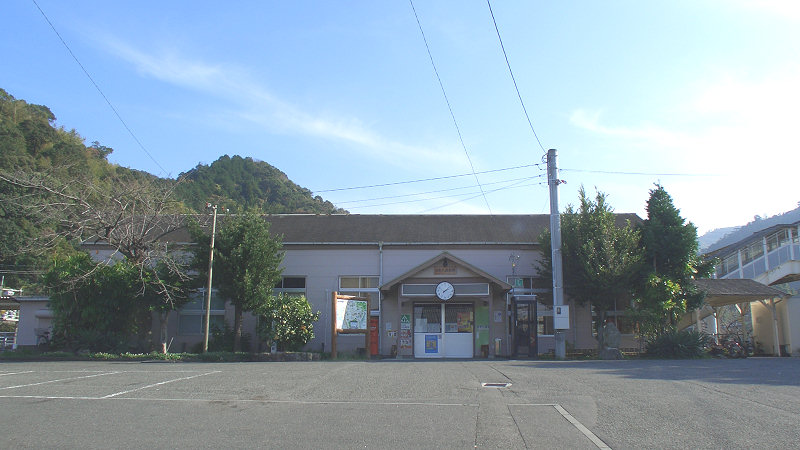
- Hinagu-Onsen Station in 2006

General information
- Location: Hinagushio Kitamachi, Yatsushiro-shi, Kumamoto-ken 869-5142; Japan
- Coordinates: 32.4361683°N 130.5816491°E
- Operator: Hisatsu Orange Railway Co., Ltd.
- Line: Hisatsu Orange Railway
- Distance: 10.1 km from Yatsushiro; 5.3 km from Higo Kouda
- Platforms: 2 side platforms
- Tracks: 3

Construction
- Structure type: At-grade

Other information
- Station code: OR03
- Website: Official (in Japanese)

History
- Opened: 15 July 1923
- Former names: Hinagu (to 2019)
- Original company: Japanese Government Railways
Location
- Location within Kumamoto Prefecture Location within Japan

Hinagu-Onsen Station (日奈久温泉駅, Hinagu-Onsen-eki) is a passenger railway station in the city of Yatsushiro, Kumamoto Prefecture, Japan. It is served by the third-sector railway company Hisatsu Orange Railway

== Lines ==
The station is served by the Hisatsu Orange Railway Line that follows the former coastal route of the JR Kyushu Kagoshima Main Line connecting Yatsushiro and Sendai. It is located 10.1 km from the starting point of the line at Yatsushiro.

== Station layout ==
This station has a wooden station building managed by the Hinagu Okin Women's Association, a resident group for the Hinagu district. This wooden station building was constructed when the station first opened in 1923, and is still in use in its original condition with almost no repairs. It is the oldest station building on the Hisatsu Orange Railway. As the station is located in a hot spring tourist area, it has a large waiting room. In addition to station duties, station staff also provide tourist information for Hinagu Onsen town. The station has two opposed side platforms connected by a footbridge. The station is staffed.

=== Platforms ===
1	■ ■ Hisatsu Orange Railway	for Yatsushiro and Shin-Yatsushiro
2	■ ■ Hisatsu Orange Railway	for Minamata and Izumi

== Gallery ==
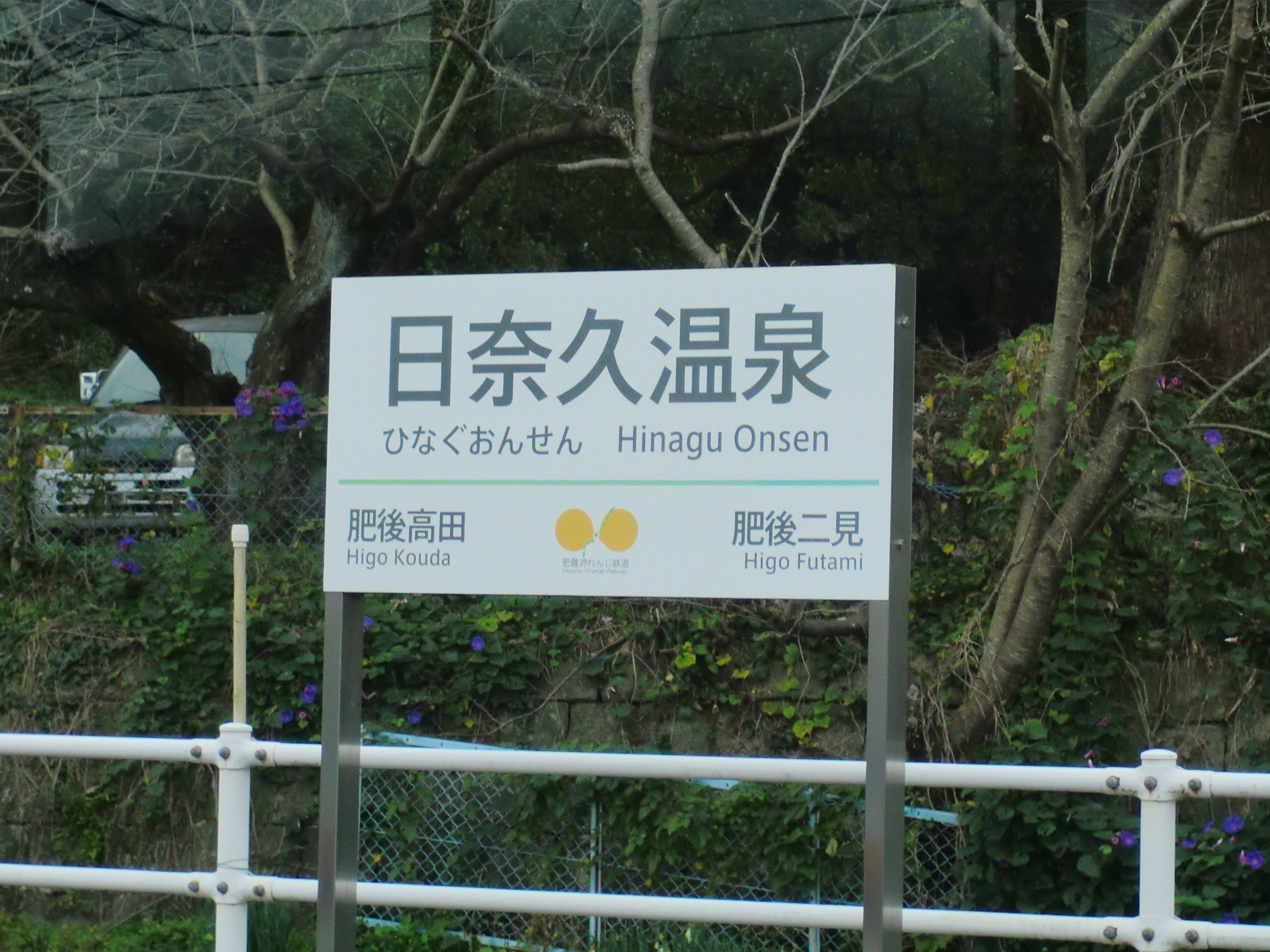
Station sign

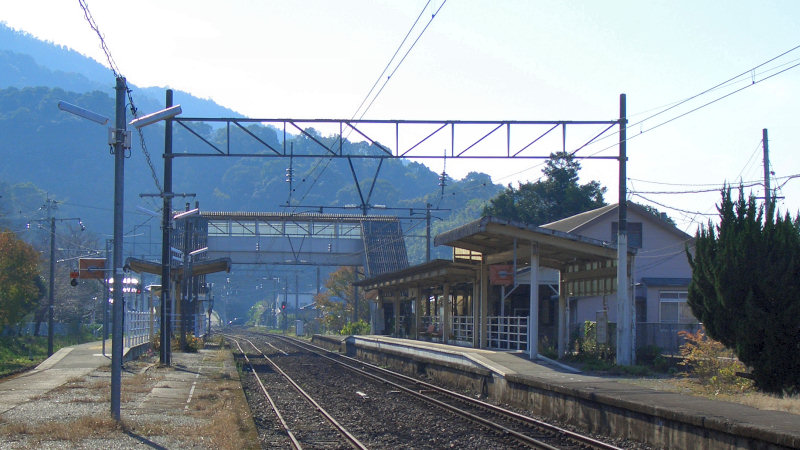
View of platforms

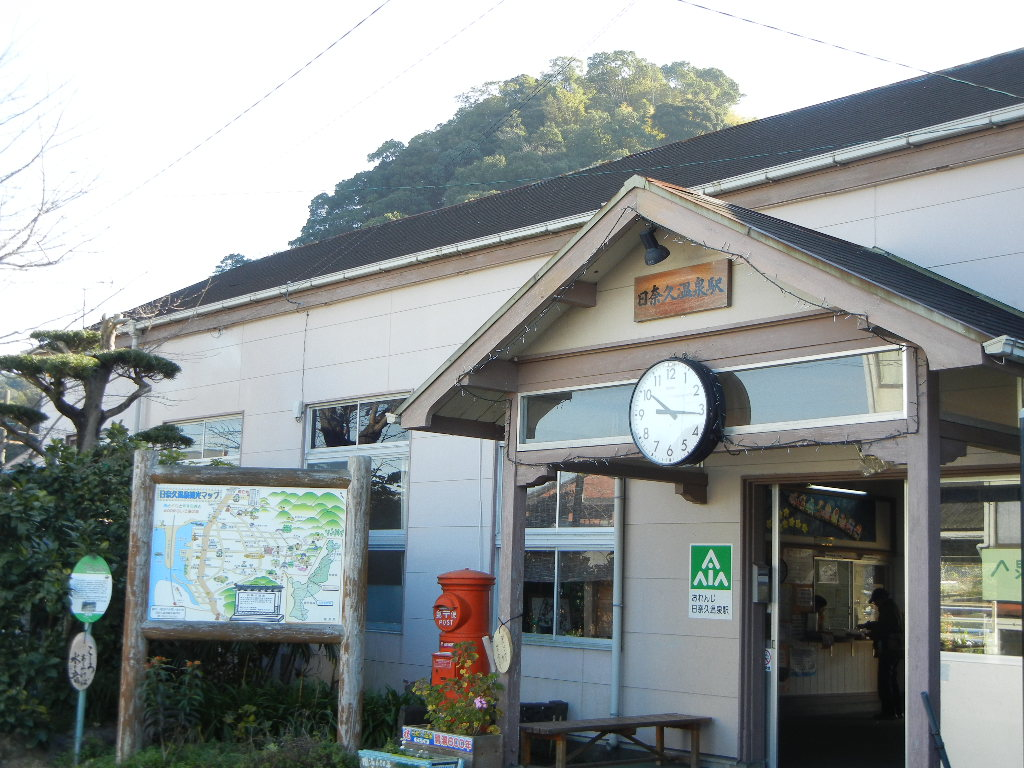
Closer view of station entrance

== Adjacent stations ==
«	Service	»
Hisatsu Orange Railway Line
Higo Kouda	Local	Higo Futami
Yatsushiro	Rapid Express Super Orange	Sashiki

== History ==
Hinagu Onsen Station was opened on 15 July 1923 as a Hinagu Station (日奈久温泉駅, Hinagu Onsen-eki) on the Japanese Government Railways Kagoshima Main Line. With the privatization of the Japan National Railways on 1 April 1987, the station was transferred to JR Kyushu. On 13 March 2004, with the opening of the Kyushu Shinkansen, the station was transferred to the Hisatsu Orange Railway, and it was renamed to its present name. On 1 October 2019 the station name sign was updated with the introduction of station numbering. The English name was changed from "Hinagu Onsen" to "Hinagu-Onsen."

== Passenger statistics ==
The average daily passenger traffic in fiscal 2019 was 78 passengers.

== Surrounding area ==
- Japan National Route 3
- Hinagu Onsen
- Yatsushiro City Hall Hinagu Branch Office

== See also ==
- List of railway stations in Japan
