= Yoshio Station =

Railway station in Ashikita, Kumamoto Prefecture, Japan

Yoshio Station 吉尾駅
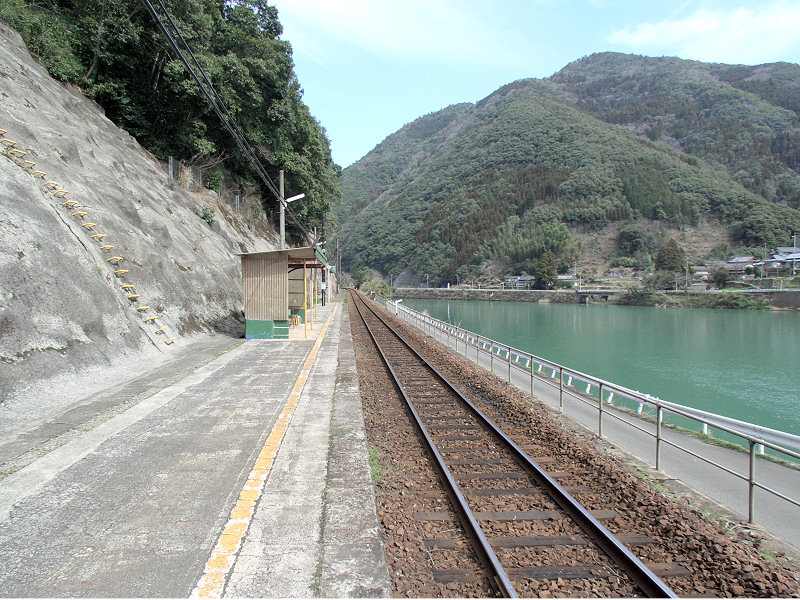
- Yoshio Station in March 2007

General information
- Location: Japan
- Coordinates: 32°19′51″N 130°36′01″E
- Operator: JR Kyushu
- Line: ■ Hisatsu Line

Other information
- Website: Official website
Location
- Location within Japan

Yoshio Station (吉尾駅, Yoshio-eki) is a railway station on the Hisatsu Line in Ashikita, Kumamoto, Japan, operated by Kyushu Railway Company (JR Kyushu). The Kuma River runs on the east side of the tracks. Less than 1 km South of the Yoshio Station runs the Yoshio River.

== Lines ==
Yoshio Station is served by the Hisatsu Line.

== Layout ==
The station has a single side platform serving one bi-directional track.

== Adjacent stations ==
←	Service	→
Hisatsu Line
Kaiji	Local	Shiroishi

== See also ==
- List of railway stations in Japan
