= Sakamoto Station (Kumamoto) =

Railway station in Yatsushiro, Kumamoto Prefecture, Japan

Sakamoto Station 坂本駅
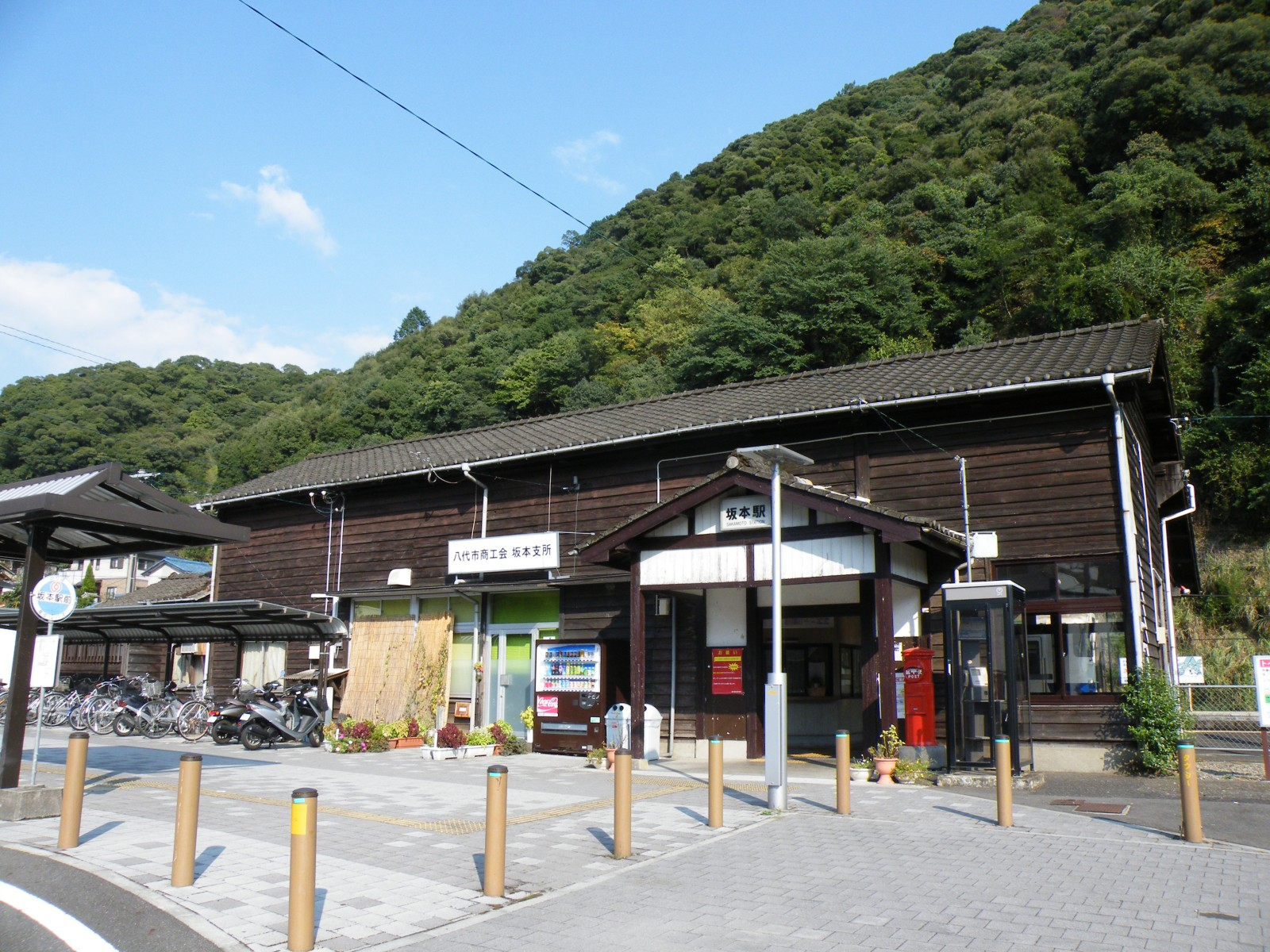
- Sakamoto Station in September 2009

General information
- Location: Yatsushiro, Kumamoto, Japan
- Coordinates: 32.4349°N 130.6579°E
- Operator: JR Kyushu
- Line: ■ Hisatsu Line

Other information
- Website: Official website
Location
- Location within Japan

Sakamoto Station (坂本駅, Sakamoto-eki) is a railway station on the Hisatsu Line in Yatsushiro, Kumamoto, Japan, operated by Kyushu Railway Company (JR Kyushu).

== Lines ==
Sakamoto Station is served by the Hisatsu Line.

== Adjacent stations ==
←	Service	→
Hisatsu Line
Dan	Local	Haki

== See also ==
- List of railway stations in Japan
