= Yatsushiro =

Yatsushiro 八代市
- City
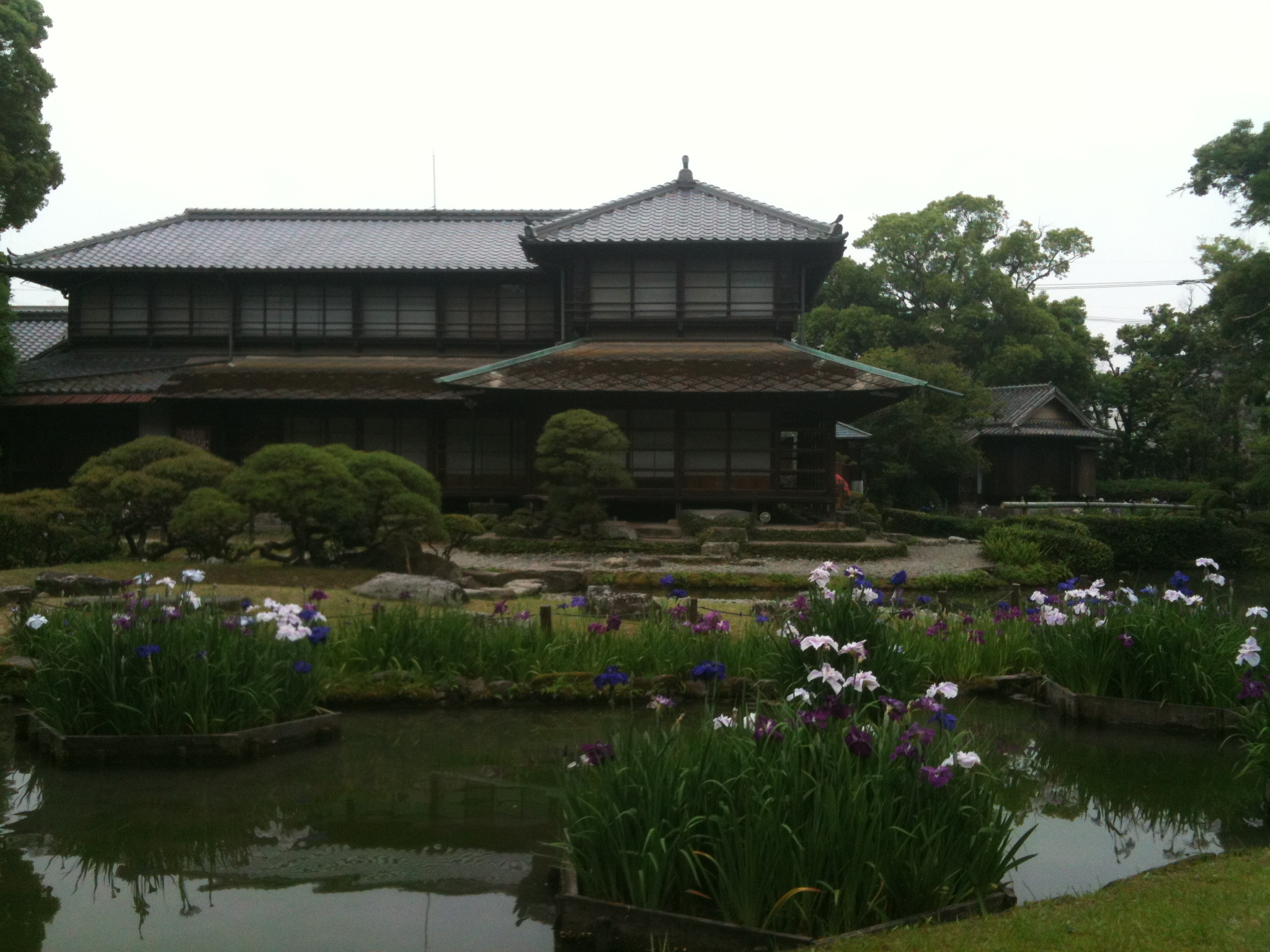
- Shohinken

- Flag Seal
- Location of Yatsushiro in Kumamoto Prefecture

- Location in Japan
- Coordinates: 32°30′27″N 130°36′06″E
- Country: Japan
- Region: Kyūshū
- Prefecture: Kumamoto

Government
  - Mayor: Taisuke Ono

Area
  - Total: 681.29 km^{2} (263.05 sq mi)

Population (August 31, 2024)
  - Total: 120,389
  - Density: 176.71/km^{2} (457.67/sq mi)
- Time zone: UTC+09:00 (JST)
- Phone number: 0965-33-4111
- Address: 1-25 Matsuejōmachi, Yatsushiro-shi, Kumamoto-ken 866-8601
- Climate: Cfa
- Website: Official website
- Symbols
- Bird: Common kingfisher
- Flower: Prunus serrulata
- Tree: Banpeiyu

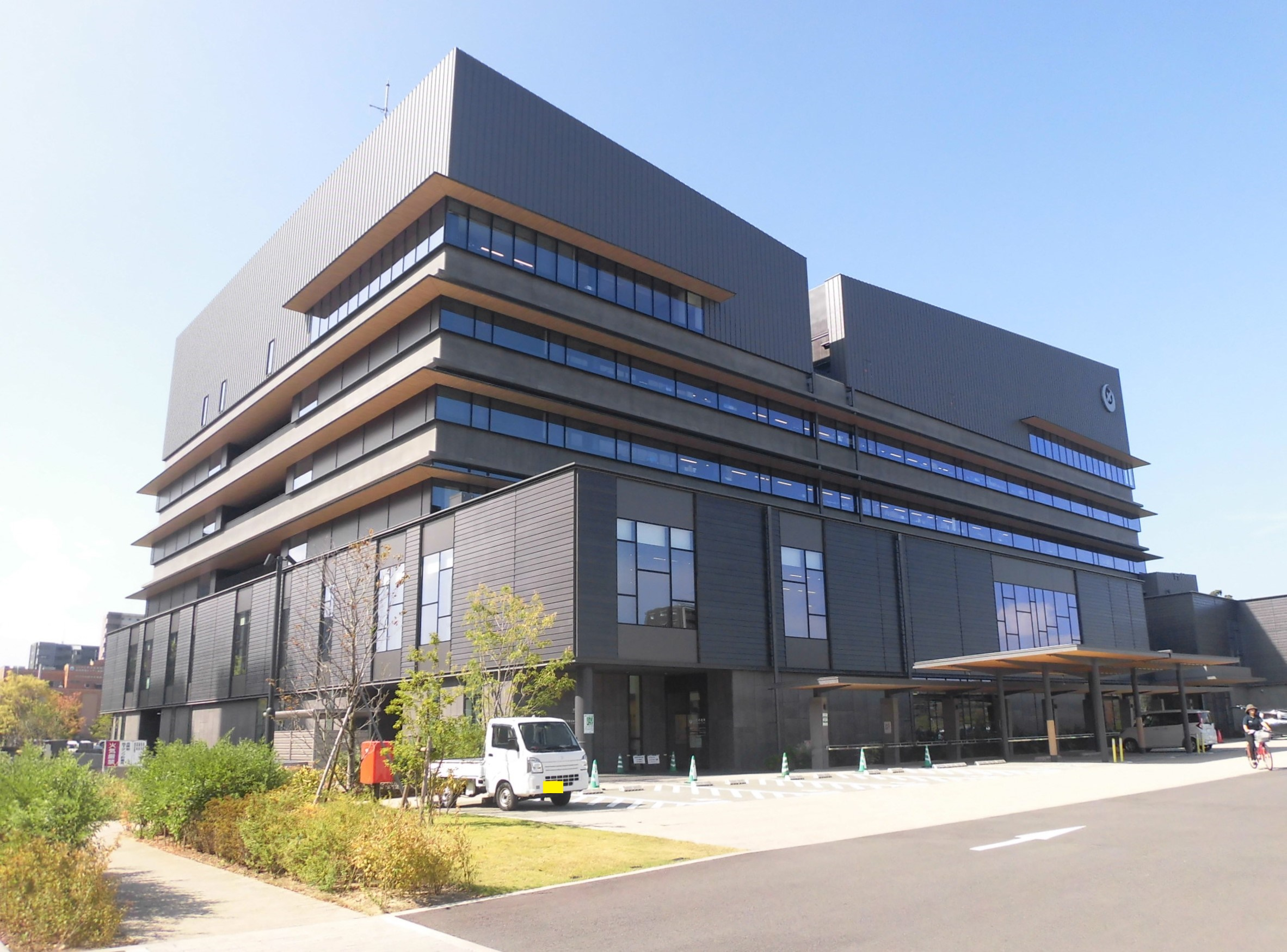
Yatsushiro City Hall

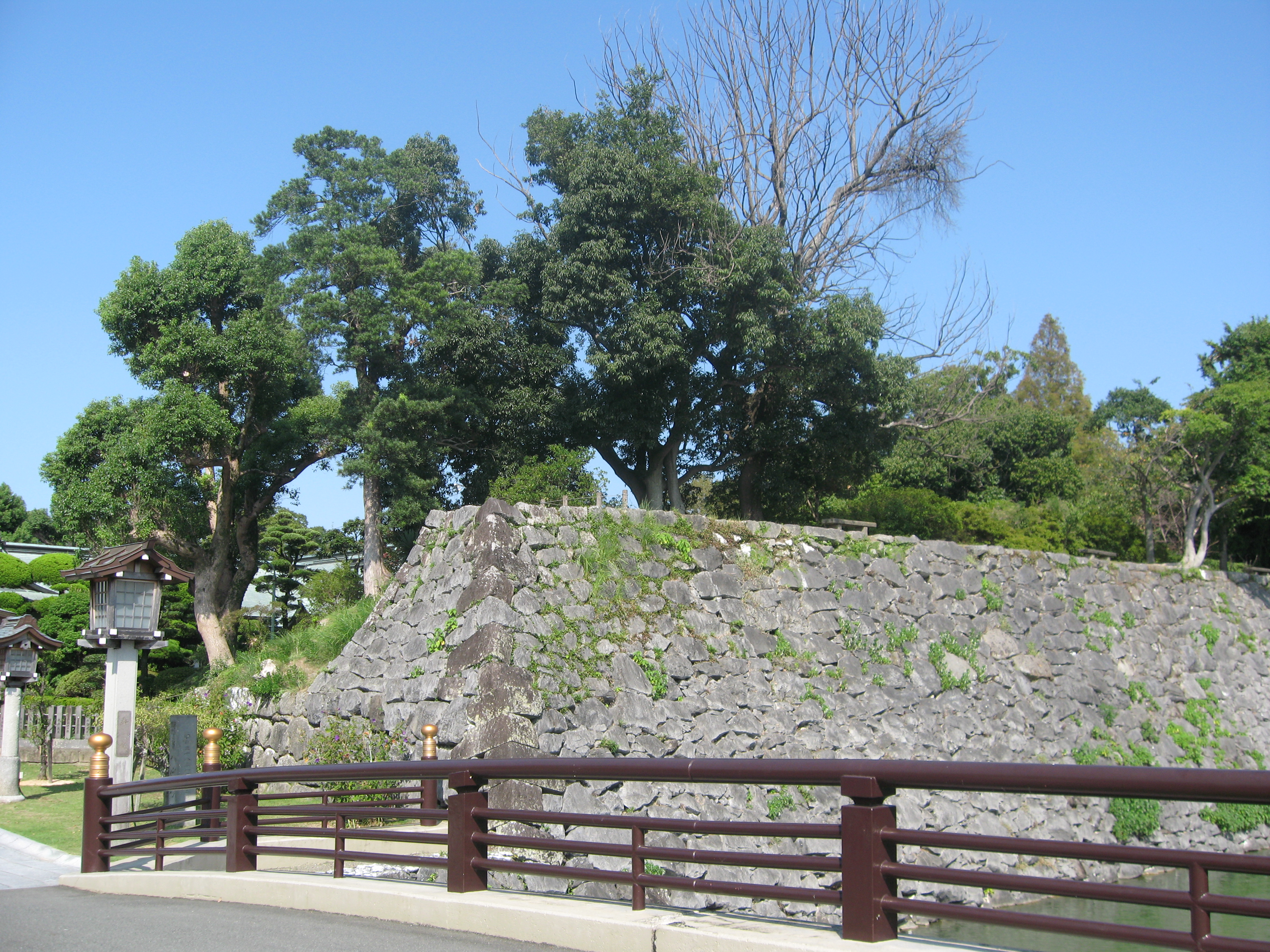
ruins of Yatsushiro Castle

Yatsushiro (八代市, Yatsushiro-shi) is a city located in Kumamoto Prefecture, Japan. As of 1 August 2024, the city had an estimated population of 120,389 in 57,953 households, and a population density of 300 persons per km^{2}. The total area of the city is 681.29 km^{2} (263.05 sq mi).

== Geography ==
Yatsushiro is located at the geographic center of Kyushu, in between Kumamoto and Ashikita. The western part is a plain facing the Shiranui Sea (Yatsushiro Sea), and most of it has expanded through several rounds of reclamation since the Edo period. The eastern and southern areas are deep mountainous areas of the Kyushu Mountains.

=== Neighboring municipalities ===
Kumamoto Prefecture

- Ashikita
- Hikawa
- Itsuki
- Kuma
- Misato
- Mizukami
- Uki
- Yamae
- Yamato

Miyazaki Prefecture

- Shiiba

=== Climate ===
Yatsushiro has a humid subtropical climate (Köppen climate classification Cfa) with hot, humid summers and cool winters. There is significant precipitation throughout the year, especially during June and July. The average annual temperature in Yatsushiro is 17.0 °C (62.6 °F). The average annual rainfall is 2,033.4 mm (80.06 in) with June as the wettest month. The temperatures are highest on average in August, at around 27.8 °C (82.0 °F), and lowest in January, at around 6.4 °C (43.5 °F). The highest temperature ever recorded in Yatsushiro was 39.2 °C (102.6 °F) on 26 August 2026; the coldest temperature ever recorded was −7.3 °C (18.9 °F) on 25 January 2016.

Climate data for Yatsushiro (1991−2020 normals, extremes 1977−present)
Month	Jan	Feb	Mar	Apr	May	Jun	Jul	Aug	Sep	Oct	Nov	Dec	Year
Record high °C (°F)	23.7 (74.7)	25.8 (78.4)	27.6 (81.7)	30.2 (86.4)	33.4 (92.1)	37.0 (98.6)	38.6 (101.5)	39.2 (102.6)	37.8 (100.0)	33.4 (92.1)	29.5 (85.1)	24.8 (76.6)	39.2 (102.6)
Mean daily maximum °C (°F)	10.9 (51.6)	12.4 (54.3)	15.9 (60.6)	21.0 (69.8)	25.4 (77.7)	27.6 (81.7)	31.5 (88.7)	32.8 (91.0)	29.6 (85.3)	24.6 (76.3)	18.8 (65.8)	13.2 (55.8)	22.0 (71.5)
Daily mean °C (°F)	6.4 (43.5)	7.6 (45.7)	10.8 (51.4)	15.5 (59.9)	19.9 (67.8)	23.2 (73.8)	27.1 (80.8)	27.8 (82.0)	24.5 (76.1)	19.2 (66.6)	13.7 (56.7)	8.5 (47.3)	17.0 (62.6)
Mean daily minimum °C (°F)	2.1 (35.8)	2.9 (37.2)	5.8 (42.4)	10.3 (50.5)	15.0 (59.0)	19.7 (67.5)	23.7 (74.7)	24.1 (75.4)	20.6 (69.1)	14.5 (58.1)	9.0 (48.2)	4.0 (39.2)	12.6 (54.8)
Record low °C (°F)	−7.3 (18.9)	−5.5 (22.1)	−1.9 (28.6)	−0.1 (31.8)	6.7 (44.1)	10.5 (50.9)	17.8 (64.0)	18.1 (64.6)	9.3 (48.7)	3.7 (38.7)	−0.4 (31.3)	−3.6 (25.5)	−7.3 (18.9)
Average precipitation mm (inches)	69.9 (2.75)	90.6 (3.57)	118.3 (4.66)	133.1 (5.24)	165.8 (6.53)	426.2 (16.78)	386.7 (15.22)	203.7 (8.02)	196.8 (7.75)	101.1 (3.98)	93.2 (3.67)	73.2 (2.88)	2,033.4 (80.06)
Average precipitation days (≥ 1.0 mm)	8.3	9.1	11.3	10.4	10.0	15.4	13.0	11.2	10.3	7.4	8.5	8.6	123.5
Mean monthly sunshine hours	118.8	131.4	160.8	179.9	187.7	121.5	187.8	209.8	169.9	177.1	143.7	131.1	1,922
Source: Japan Meteorological Agency

== Demographics ==
Per Japanese census data, the population of Yatsushiro in 2020 is 123,067 people. Yatsushiro has been conducting censuses since 1920.

Historical population

Year	Pop.	±%
1920	100,007	—
1925	106,172	+6.2%
1930	108,768	+2.4%
1935	113,963	+4.8%
1940	115,138	+1.0%
1945	147,489	+28.1%
1950	155,373	+5.3%
1955	164,725	+6.0%
1960	164,685	−0.0%
1965	156,277	−5.1%
1970	149,647	−4.2%

Year	Pop.	±%
1975	147,715	−1.3%
1980	150,389	+1.8%
1985	149,421	−0.6%
1990	145,959	−2.3%
1995	143,712	−1.5%
2000	140,655	−2.1%
2005	136,886	−2.7%
2010	132,314	−3.3%
2015	127,472	−3.7%
2020	123,067	−3.5%

Yatsushiro population statistics

== History ==
The name "Yatsushiro" is extremely ancient, and appears in the Nihon Shoki and other Nara period documents. It is said to have been derived from a mountain shrine believed to have been the tomb of Amaterasu. In the Nara and Heian periods, it was a center for trade with Baekje and Song China. During the Sengoku period, the area was contested between the Nawa, Sagara, Shimazu and other warlords before coming under the control of Konishi Yukinaga under the time of Toyotomi Hideyoshi. Konishi built Mugishima Castle in 1588 as a new base for ruling Yatsushiro. After the 1600 Battle of Sekigahara, Kato Kiyomasa, the lord of Kumamoto Castle, became the ruler of Higo Province. Mugishima Castle was an exception to the Tokugawa shogunate's "One Castle per Province" order of 1615 and remained a secondary castle under Kumamoto Domain until its destruction by earthquake in 1619. Yatsushiro Castle was constructed as its replacement. After the Hosokawa clan took control of Higo Province, the castle became the stronghold of their 30,000 koku karō, the Matsue clan, who controlled the castle town to the end of the Edo period. The town of Yatsushiro was established with the creation of the modern municipalities system on April 1, 1889. On September 1, 1940, Yatsushiro annexed the town of Otago, and villages of Ueyanagi, and Matsutaka and was raised to city status. The city continues to expand in the 1950s and 1960 by annexing neighboring villages.

On August 1, 2005, Yatsushiro absorbed the towns of Kagami and Senchō, and the villages of Izumi, Sakamoto and Tōyō (all from Yatsushiro District) to create the new and expanded city of Yatsushiro.

== Government ==
Yatsushiro has a mayor-council form of government with a directly elected mayor and a unicameral city council of 32 members. Yatsushiro, collectively with the town of Hikawa, contributes four members to the Kumamoto Prefectural Assembly. In terms of national politics, the city is part of the Kumamoto 4th district of the lower house of the Diet of Japan.

== Economy ==
Traditionally, the Yatsushiro Plain is a major producer of rice and igusa, which is the raw material for tatami mats. Agriculture remains a major component of the local economy. The banpeiyu fruit bears a resemblance to hugely oversized grapefruits. Karashi Renkon is a specialty which is a lotus root stuffed with a mustard-like sauce called karashi and coated with egg. Basashi is raw horse meat and is considered a delicacy within Japan. It is often served with onion and ginger. Basashi burgers can be found at hamburger restaurants.

In the Meiji era, Yatsushiro Port was developed as a modern port, and in 1890, Kyushu's first cement factory was built there. Local industries include pulp and paper, brewing and food processing.

== Education ==
Yatsushiro has 23 public elementary schools and 15 public junior high schools operated by the city government and one junior high school and five public high schools operated by the Kumamoto Prefectural Board of Education. The prefecture also operates two special education schools for the handicapped. Nakakyushu Junior College is a private junior college located in Yatsushiro.

== Transportation ==
=== Railways ===
JR Kyushu - Kyushu Shinkansen

- Shin-Yatsushiro

JR Kyushu - Trans-Kyushu Limited Express

■ - Yatsushiro

JR Kyushu - Kagoshima Main Line

■ - Arisa - Senchō - Shin-Yatsushiro - Yatsushiro

JR Kyushu - Hisatsu Line

■ - Yatsushiro - Dan - Sakamoto - Haki - Kamase - Setoishi(operations suspended)

Hisatsu Orange Railway

- (Shin-Yatsushiro) - Yatsushiro - Higo Kouda - Hinagu Onsen - Kami Tanoura - Higo Futami

=== Highways ===
- Kyushu Expressway
- Minamikyushu Expressway
- National Route 3
- National Route 219
- National Route 443
- National Route 445

== Local attractions ==
- Yatsushiro Castle ruins, National Historic Site, one of the Continued Top 100 Japanese Castles.
- Yatsushiro-gū, one of the Fifteen Shrines of the Kenmu Restoration.
- Yatsushiro ware ceramics

=== Festivals ===
- Kumagawa Festival: Held in early August, this festival celebrates the Kumagawa River which flows through the city. During the festival, various schools, companies, and groups will dance through the streets to music. Some of the festival goers even come in costume! Food stalls and festival food are also available.
- Kyushu International Three Day March: Held in mid-May, foreigners and locals join in planned walks around the city and its surrounding areas. Various routes are available such as 5, 10, 20, 30, and 40 km courses. Food and beverages can also be purchased at the festival and there is local entertainment at the center stage. There is an English speaking staff on hand for those who need English assistance.
- Myokensai Festival: Yatsushiro is known for its Myokensai festival on November 23 of each year, which includes a parade of horses through the streets of the city. Also, each fall Yatsushiro hosts one of Japan's largest fireworks displays.
- Yatsushiro Fireworks Festival: Usually hosted in late fall, this is one of the largest if not the largest fireworks festival in Kyushu. Firework companies enter into this festival to showcase their designs!

== Media ==
The city has a community radio station called FM Yatsushiro.

== Sports ==
Yatsushiro hosted group matches at the 2019 World Women's Handball Championship.

== Notable people from Yatsushiro ==
- Shoko Asahara, founder of Aum Shinrikyo
- Eiji Ezaki, retired professional wrestler best known as Hayabusa
- Yuki Fukushima, badminton player
- Eri Ishida, actress
- Kimiko Jinnai, badminton player
- Jun Kunimura, actor
- Haruto Kō, poet and novelist
- Nobuhiko Matsunaka, baseball player
- Matsuki Miyazaki, doctor
- Kosuke Noda, baseball player
- Matsui Okinaga, samurai
- Nishiyama Sōin, haikai-no-renga poet
- Aki Yashiro, singer
