= Higo Tanoura Station =

Railway station in Ashikita, Kumamoto Prefecture, Japan

Higo Tanoura Station 肥後田浦駅
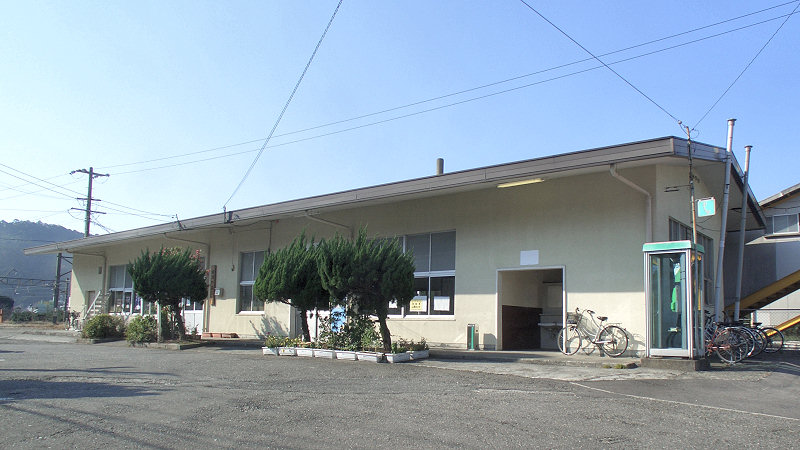
- Higo Tanoura Station in 2006

General information
- Location: Kodanoura, Ashikita-machi, Ashikita-gun, Kumamoto-ken 869-5303; Japan
- Coordinates: 32.3505892°N 130.5047265°E
- Operator: Hisatsu Orange Railway Co., Ltd.
- Line: Hisatsu Orange Railway
- Distance: 23.3 km from Yatsushiro; 1.5 km from Tanoura Otachimisaki Park
- Platforms: 2 side platforms
- Tracks: 2

Construction
- Structure type: At-grade

Other information
- Station code: OR07
- Website: Official (in Japanese)

History
- Opened: 15 April 1925
- Original company: Japanese Government Railways

Passengers
- FY2019: 85
Location
- Location within Kumamoto Prefecture Location within Japan

Higo Tanoura Station (肥後田浦駅, Higo Tanoura-eki) is a passenger railway station in the town of Agukita, Kumamoto Prefecture, Japan. It is served by the third-sector railway company Hisatsu Orange Railway

== Lines ==
The station is served by the Hisatsu Orange Railway Line that follows the former coastal route of the JR Kyushu Kagoshima Main Line connecting Yatsushiro and Sendai. It is located 23.6 km from the starting point of the line at Yatsushiro.

== Station layout ==
The station consists of two opposed side platforms at street level, connected by a footbridge. TIn addition, a freight platform remains and is currently used as a storage track for track maintenance vehicles. The reinforced concrete station building is unattended.

=== Platforms ===
1	■ ■ Hisatsu Orange Railway	for Minamata and Izumi
2	■ ■ Hisatsu Orange Railway	for Yatsushiro and Shin-Yatsushiro

== Gallery ==
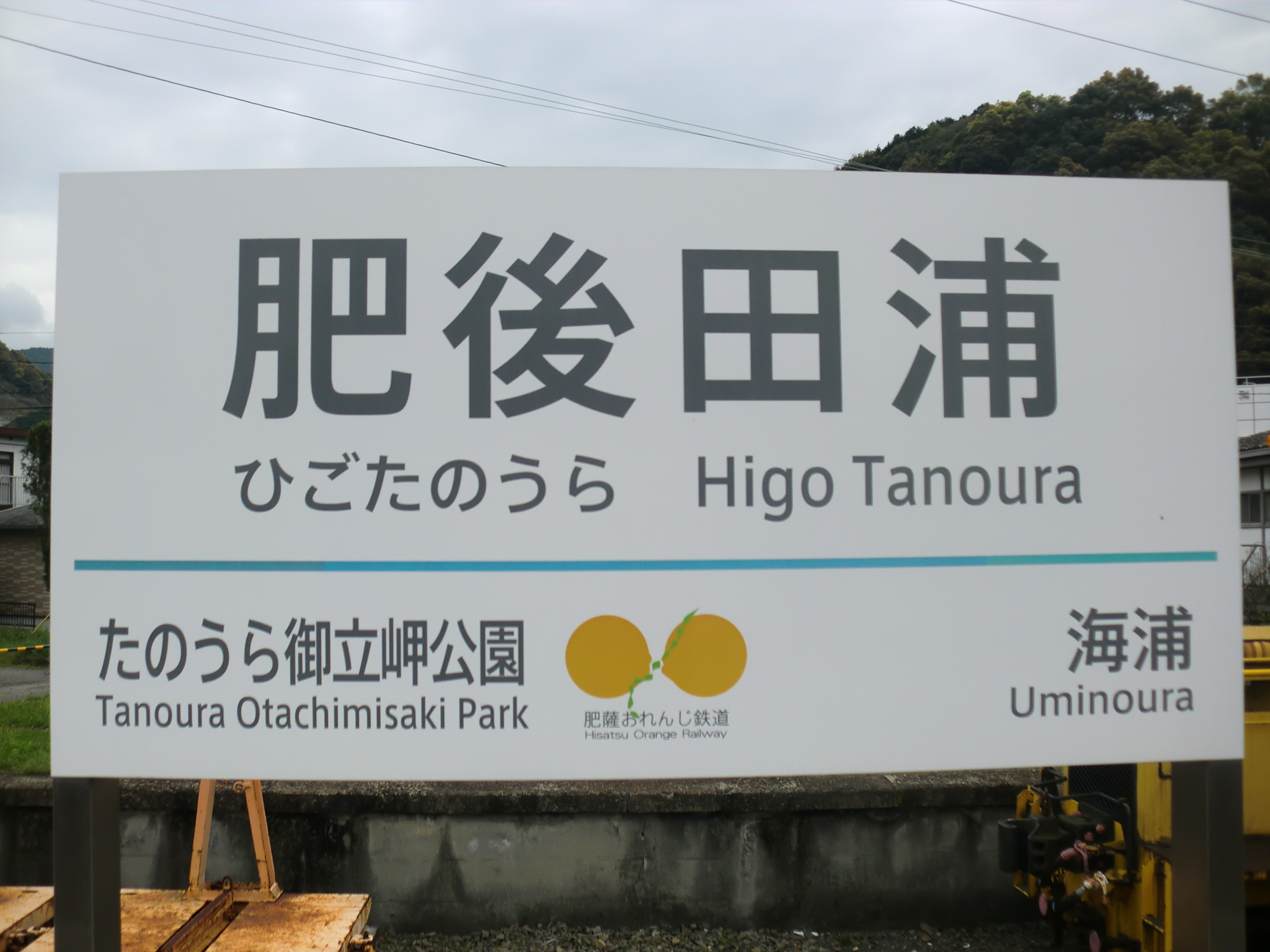
Station sign

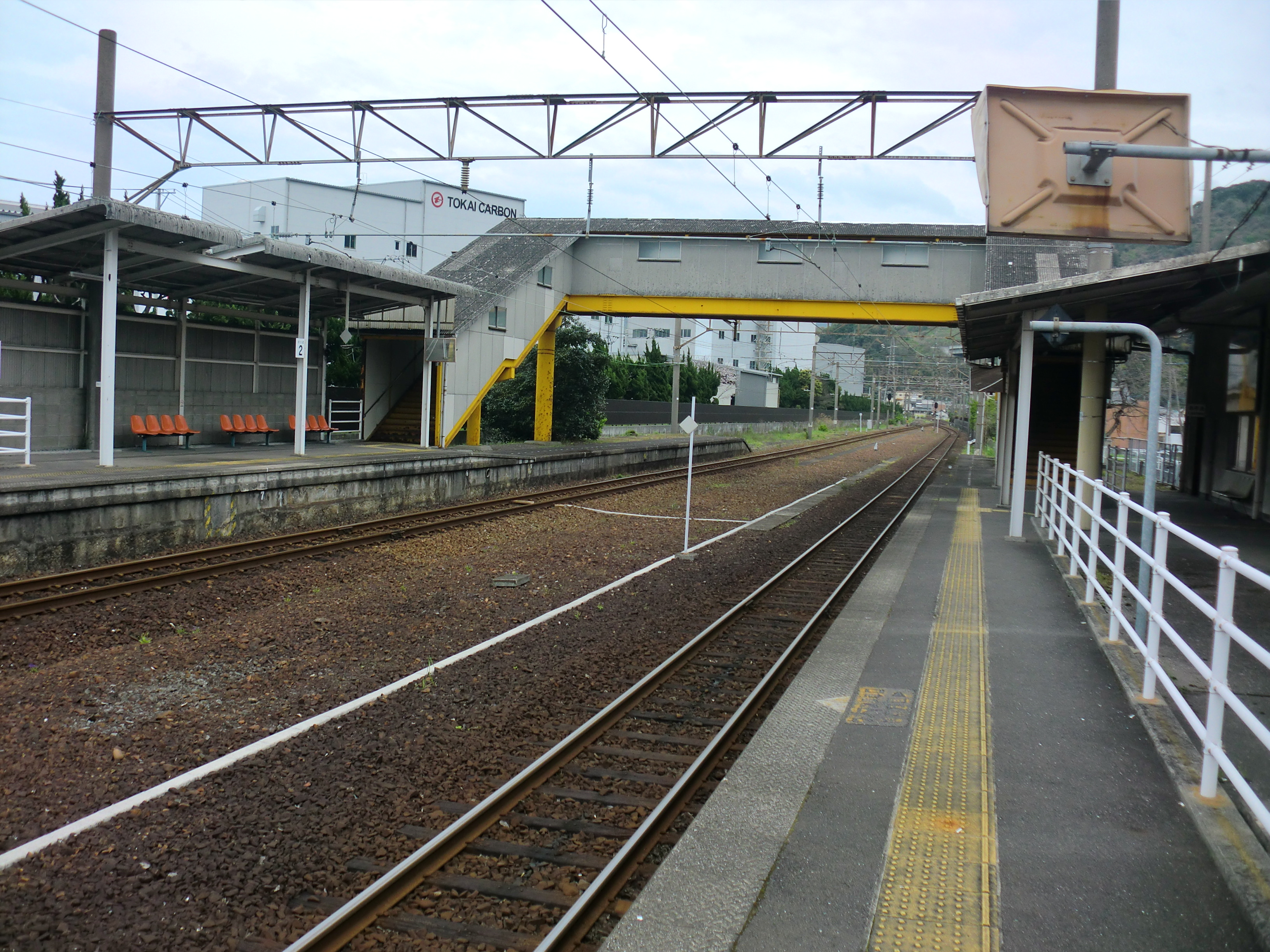
View of platforms

== Adjacent stations ==
«	Service	»
Hisatsu Orange Railway Line
Tanoura Otachimisaki Park	–	Uminoura

== History ==
Higo Tanoura Station was opened on 4 April 1925 as a station on the Japanese Government Railways Kagoshima Main Line. With the privatization of the Japan National Railways on 1 April 1987, the station was transferred to JR Kyushu. On 13 March 2004, with the opening of the Kyushu Shinkansen, the station was transferred to the Hisatsu Orange Railway.

== Passenger statistics ==
The average daily passenger traffic in fiscal 2019 was 85 passengers.

== Surrounding area ==
- Tokai Carbon Tanoura Factory
- Tanoura Port

== See also ==
- List of railway stations in Japan
