= Kami Tanoura Station =

Railway station in Ashikita, Kumamoto Prefecture, Japan

Kami Tanoura Station 上田浦駅
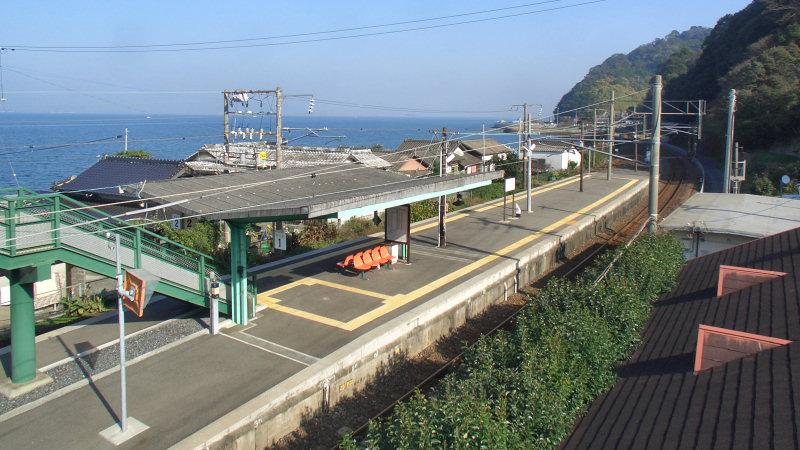
- Kami Tanoura Stationin 2006

General information
- Location: Imuta, Ashikita-mchi, Ashikita-gun, Kumamoto-ken 869-5307; Japan
- Coordinates: 32.3928723°N 130.5185212°E
- Operator: Hisatsu Orange Railway Co., Ltd.
- Line: Hisatsu Orange Railway
- Distance: 18.0 km from Yatsushiro; 4.3 km from Higo Futami
- Platforms: 1 island platform
- Tracks: 2

Construction
- Structure type: At-grade

Other information
- Website: Official (in Japanese)

History
- Opened: 10 October 1952
- Original company: Japanese National Railways

Passengers
- FY2019: 18
Location
- Location within Kumamoto Prefecture Location within Japan

Kami Tanoura Station (上田浦駅, Kami Tanoura-eki) it is a passenger railway station in the town of Agukita, Kumamoto Prefecture, Japan. It is served by the third-sector railway company Hisatsu Orange Railway

== Lines ==
The station is served by the Hisatsu Orange Railway Line that follows the former coastal route of the JR Kyushu Kagoshima Main Line connecting Yatsushiro and Sendai. It is located 18.0 km from the starting point of the line at Yatsushiro.

== Station layout ==
The station consists of one island platform at street level, connected by a footbridge and two tracks. There is no station building, but a i front of the station, there is a log cabin-style bicycle parking lot built in 1990, which is often mistaken for a station building. The station is unattended.

=== Platforms ===
1	■ ■ Hisatsu Orange Railway	for Minamata and Izumi
2	■ ■ Hisatsu Orange Railway	for Yatsushiro and Shin-Yatsushiro

== Gallery ==
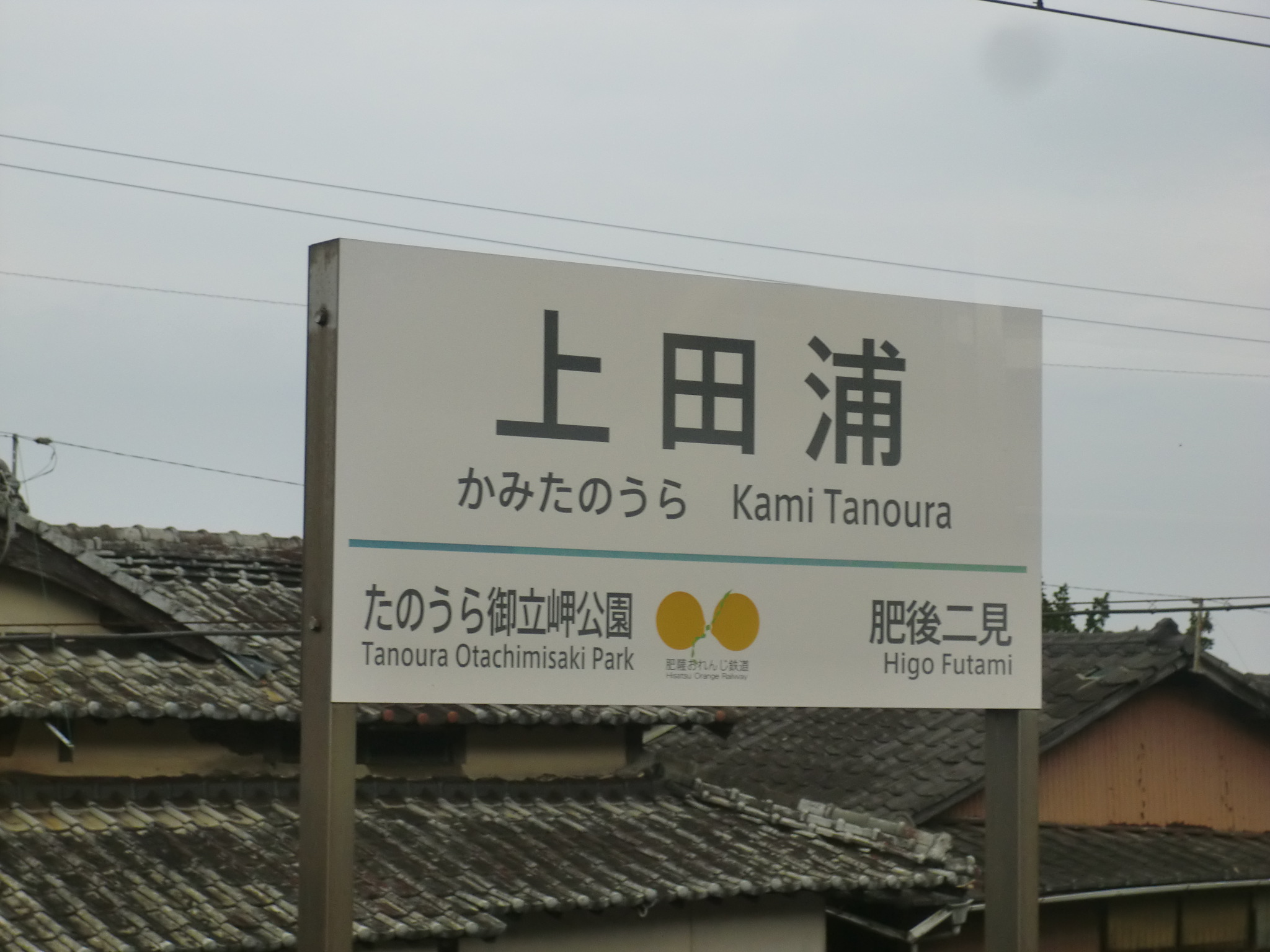
Station sign

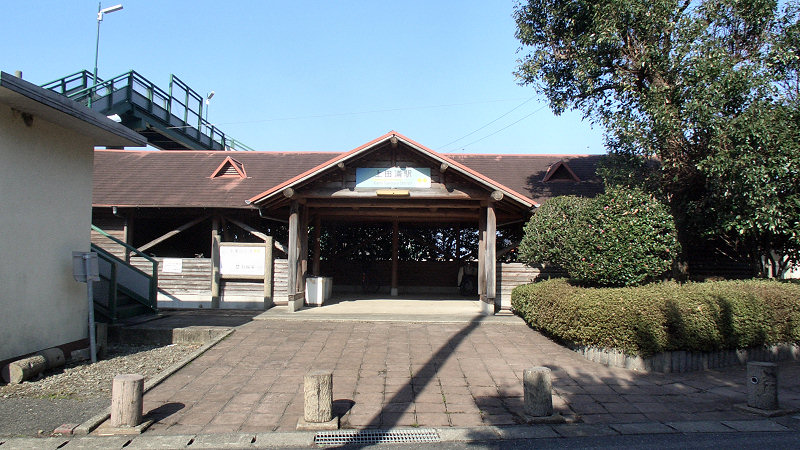
Bicycle garage

== Adjacent stations ==
«	Service	»
Hisatsu Orange Railway Line
Higo Futami	–	Tanoura Otachimisaki Park
Rapid Express Super Orange: Does not stop at this station

== History ==
Kami Tanoura Station was opened on 10 October 1952 as a station on the Japan National Railways (JNR) Kagoshima Main Line. With the privatization of the JNR on 1 April 1987, the station was transferred to JR Kyushu. On 13 March 2004, with the opening of the Kyushu Shinkansen, the station was transferred to the Hisatsu Orange Railway.

== Passenger statistics ==
The average daily passenger traffic in fiscal 2019 was 18 passengers.

== Surrounding area ==
- Koganegahama Beach

== See also ==
- List of railway stations in Japan
