= Sashiki Station =

Railway station in Ashikita, Kumamoto Prefecture, Japan

Sashiki Station 佐敷駅
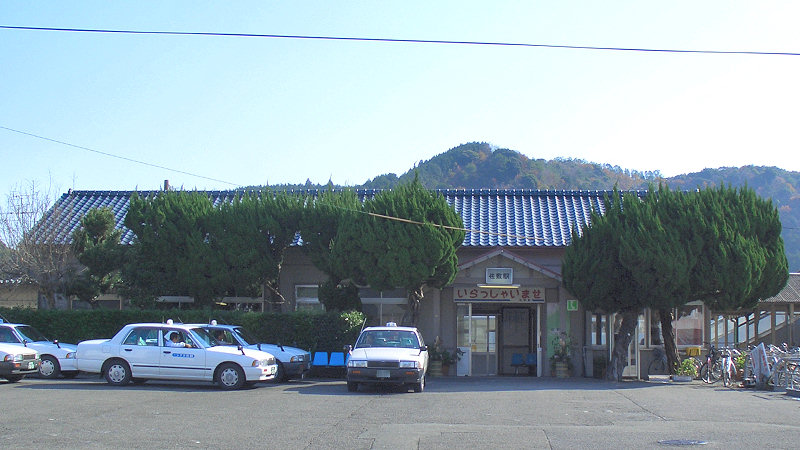
- Sashiki Station in 2006

General information
- Location: Hanaoka, Ashikita-machi, Ashikita-gun, Kumamoto-ken 869-5442; Japan
- Coordinates: 32.3023952°N 130.4971453°E
- Operator: Hisatsu Orange Railway Co., Ltd.
- Line: Hisatsu Orange Railway
- Distance: 29.8 km from Yatsushiro; 3.1 km from Uminoura
- Platforms: 1 side + 1 island platform
- Tracks: 3

Construction
- Structure type: At-grade

Other information
- Station code: OR09
- Website: Official (in Japanese)

History
- Opened: 15 April 1925
- Original company: Japanese Government Railways

Passengers
- FY2019: 573
Location
- Location within Kumamoto Prefecture Location within Japan

Sashiki Station (佐敷駅, Sashiki-eki) is a passenger railway station in the town of Agukita, Kumamoto Prefecture, Japan. It is served by the third-sector railway company Hisatsu Orange Railway

== Lines ==
The station is served by the Hisatsu Orange Railway Line that follows the former coastal route of the JR Kyushu Kagoshima Main Line connecting Yatsushiro and Sendai. It is located 29.8 km from the starting point of the line at Yatsushiro.

== Station layout ==
The station consists of one island platform and one side platform at street level, connected by a footbridge; however, only platform 1 is in normal operation. The station building is a wooden building built when the station was first opened in 1925, and is the second oldest station building on the Hisatsu Orange Railway after Hinagu Onsen Station, which was built in 1923. It is unattended.

=== Platforms ===
1	■ ■ Hisatsu Orange Railway	for Minamata and Izumi for Yatsushiro and Shin-Yatsushiro
2, 3	■ ■ Hisatsu Orange Railway	<siding>

== Gallery ==
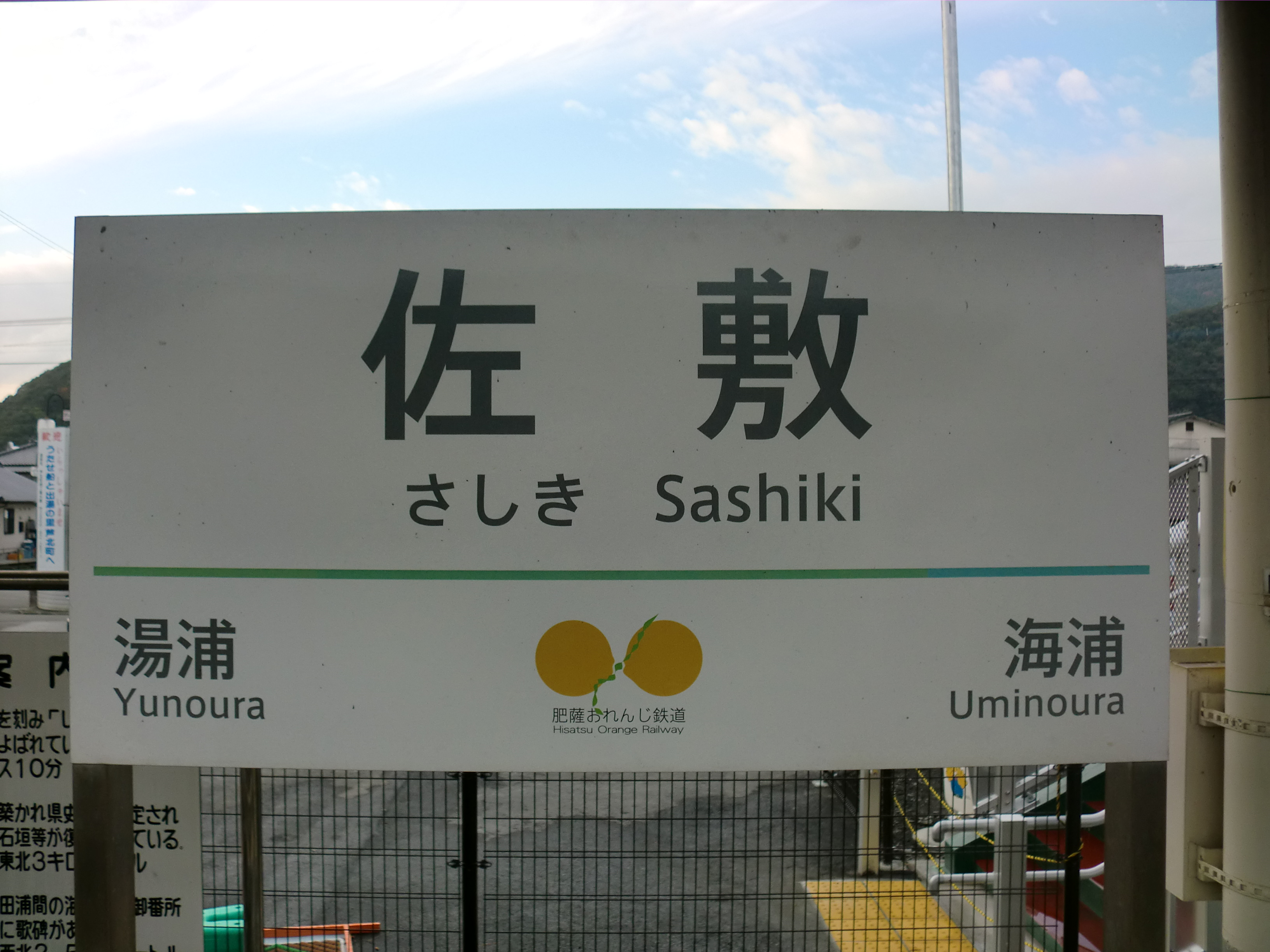
Station sign

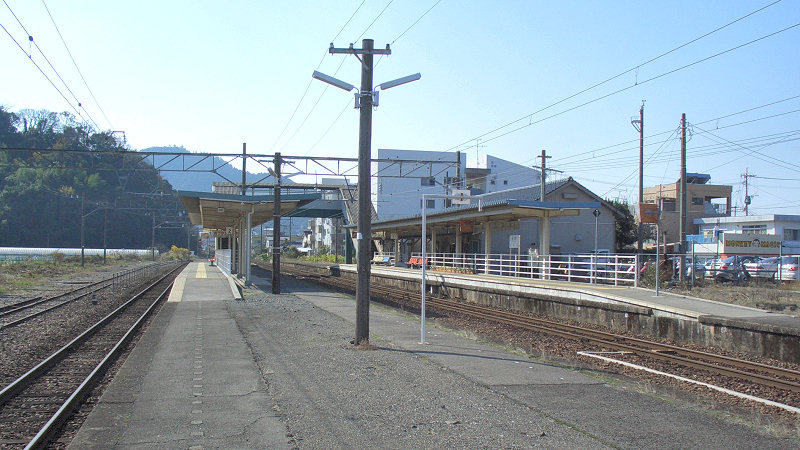
View of platforms and approach in 2006

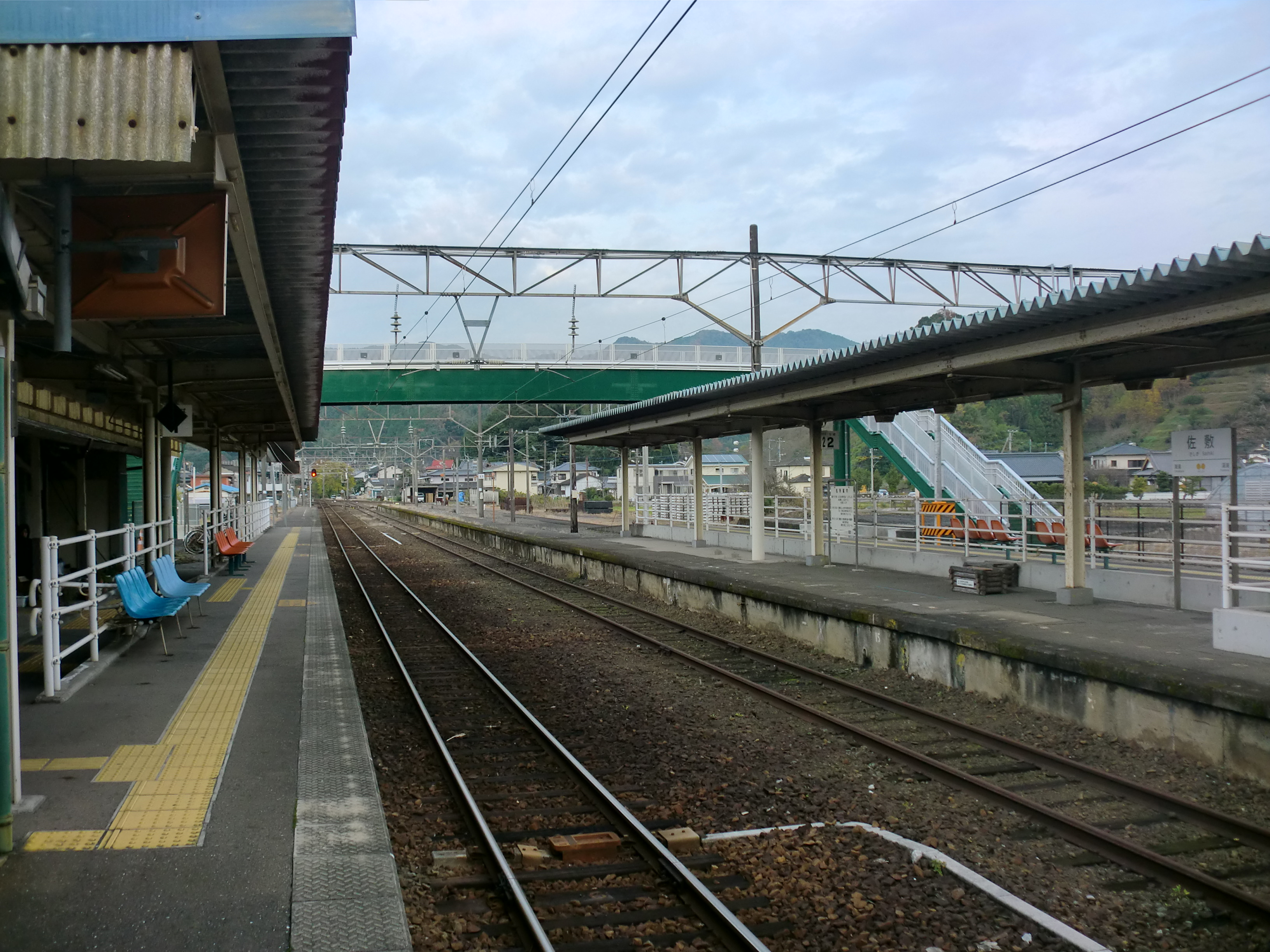
Double platforms in 2012

== Adjacent stations ==
«	Service	»
Hisatsu Orange Railway Line
Uminoura	–	Yunoura
Hinagu Onsen	Rapid Express Super Orange	Minamata

== History ==
Sashiki Station was opened on 15 April 1925 as a station on the Japanese Government Railways Kagoshima Main Line. With the privatization of the Japan National Railways on 1 April 1987, the station was transferred to JR Kyushu. On 13 March 2004, with the opening of the Kyushu Shinkansen, the station was transferred to the Hisatsu Orange Railway.

== Passenger statistics ==
The average daily passenger traffic in fiscal 2019 was 573 passengers.

== Surrounding area ==
- Ashikita Town Hall
- Ashikita Town Sashiki Junior High School
- Kumamoto Prefectural Ashikita Special Needs School

== See also ==
- List of railway stations in Japan
