= Nishi-Izumi Station =

Railway station in Izumi, Kagoshima Prefecture, Japan

Coordinates: 32.0753°N 130.3392°E

Nishi-Izumi Station 西出水駅
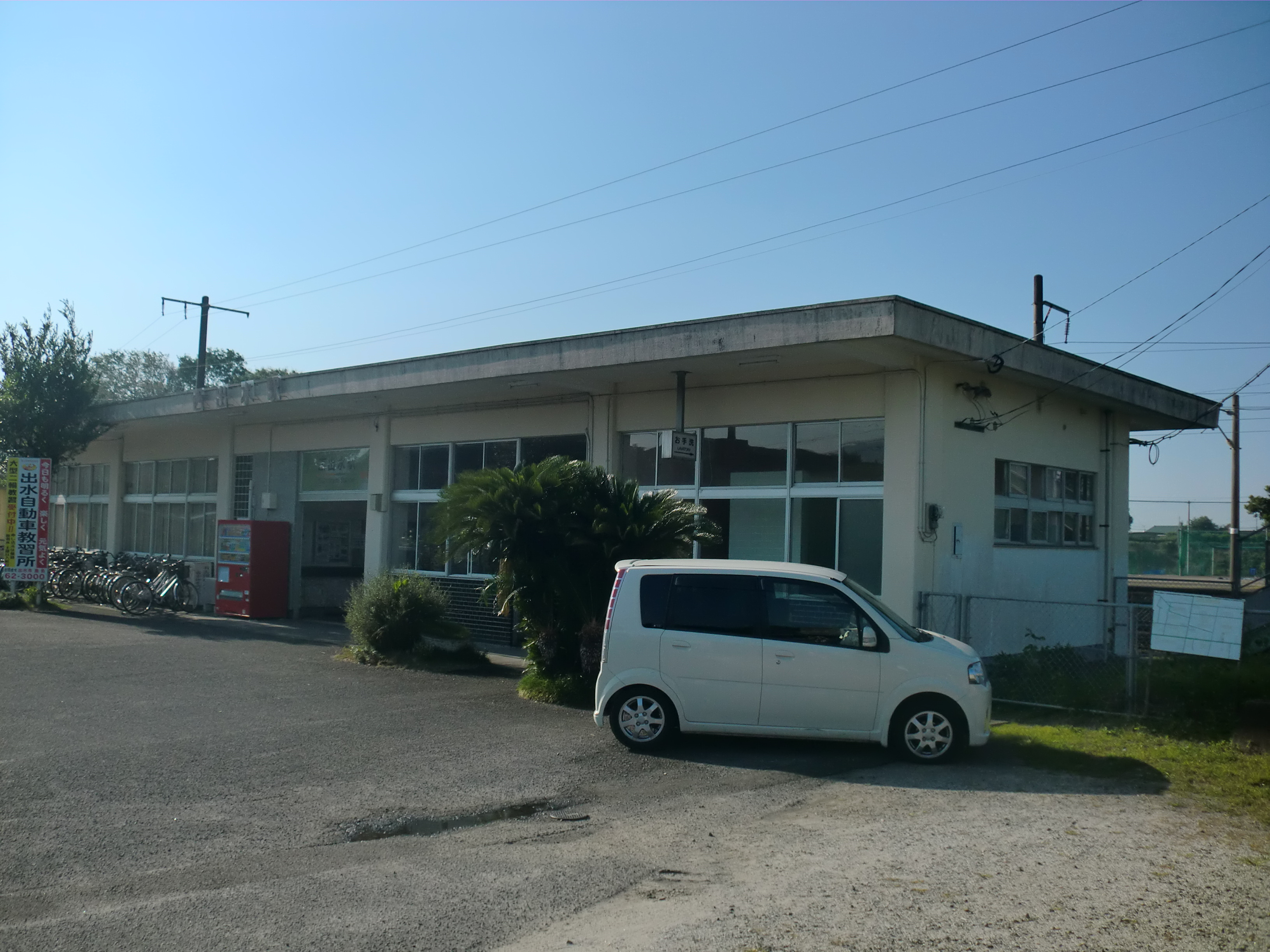
- Nishi-Izumi Station in 2012

General information
- Location: Nishiizumicho, Izumi-shi, Kagoshima-ken 899-0213; Japan
- Operator: Hisatsu Orange Railway
- Line: ■ Hisatsu Orange Railway Line
- Distance: 68.3 km from Yatsushiro
- Platforms: 1 island platform
- Tracks: 2

Construction
- Structure type: At-grade

Other information
- Station code: OR17
- Website: Official website (in Japanese)

History
- Opened: October 15, 1923
- Former names: Takemoto (until 1928)

Passengers
- FY2019: 439
Location
- Location within Kagoshima Prefecture Location within Japan

Nishi-Izumi Station (西出水駅, Nishi-Izumi-eki) is a passenger railway station located in Izumi, Kagoshima, Kagoshima Prefecture, Japan. It is operated by the third-sector railway company Hisatsu Orange Railway.

== Lines ==
The station is served by the Hisatsu Orange Railway Line, following the former coastal route of the JR Kyushu Kagoshima Main Line connecting Yatsushiro and Sendai. It is located 68.3 km from the starting point of the line at Yatsushiro.

== Station layout ==
The station consists of one island platform at street level. It has a reinforced concrete station building with a level crossing.

=== Platforms ===
1	■ ■ Hisatsu Orange Railway	for Akune and Sendai
2	■ ■Hisatsu Orange Railway	for Izumi, Minamata, and Yatsushiro

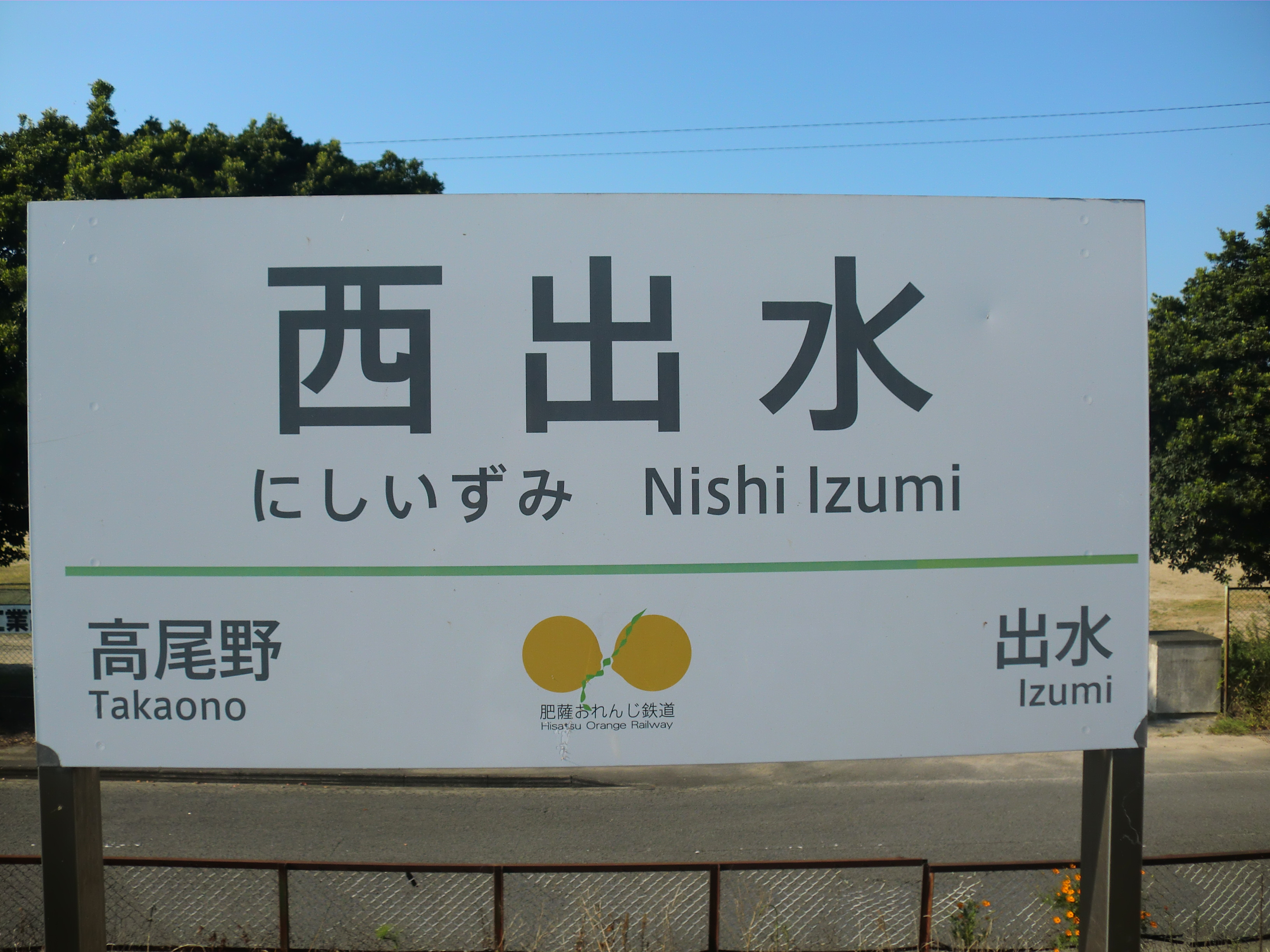
Station sign

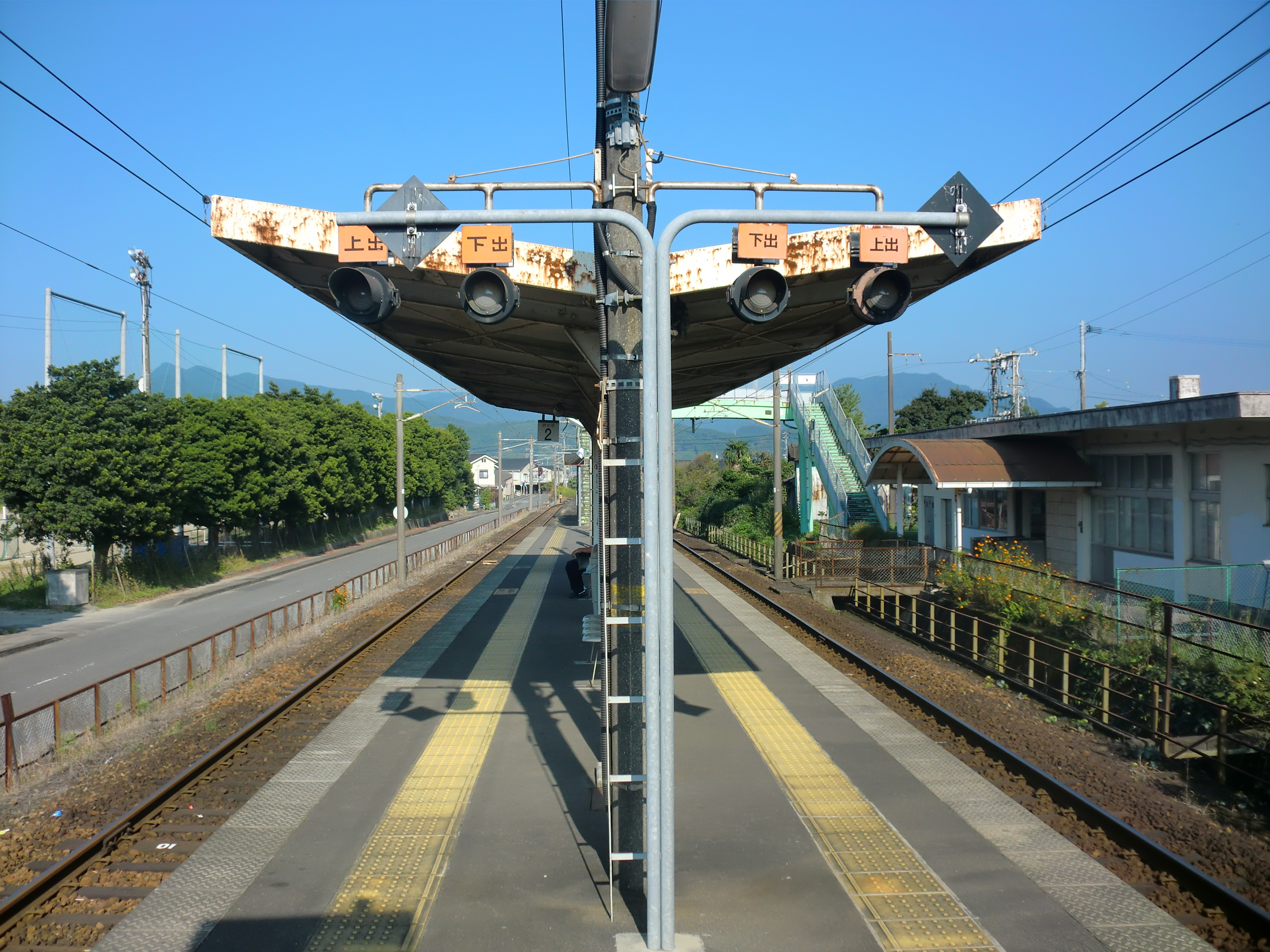
View of station platforms

== Adjacent stations ==
←	Service	→
Hisatsu Orange Railway Line
Izumi	-	Takaono

== History ==
The station opened as Takemoto Station (武本駅, Takemoto-eki) on October 15, 1923, on the Japanese Government Railways Sendai Line, which was incorporated into the Kagoshima Main Line on 17 October 1927. With the privatization of the Japan National Railways on 1 April 1987, the station was transferred to JR Kyushu. On 13 March 2004, with the opening of the Kyushu Shinkansen, the station was transferred to the Hisatsu Orange Railway. The station name was changed to the present one on July 11, 1928.

== Passenger statistics ==
The average daily passenger traffic in the 2019 fiscal year was 439 people.

== Surrounding area ==
- Izumi Chuo High School
- Kagoshima Prefectural Izumi High School
- Kagoshima Prefectural Izumi Technical High School
- Izumi City Nishi-Izumi Elementary School

== See also ==
- List of railway stations in Japan
