= Uminoura Station =

Railway station in Ashikita, Kumamoto Prefecture, Japan

Uminoura Station 海浦駅
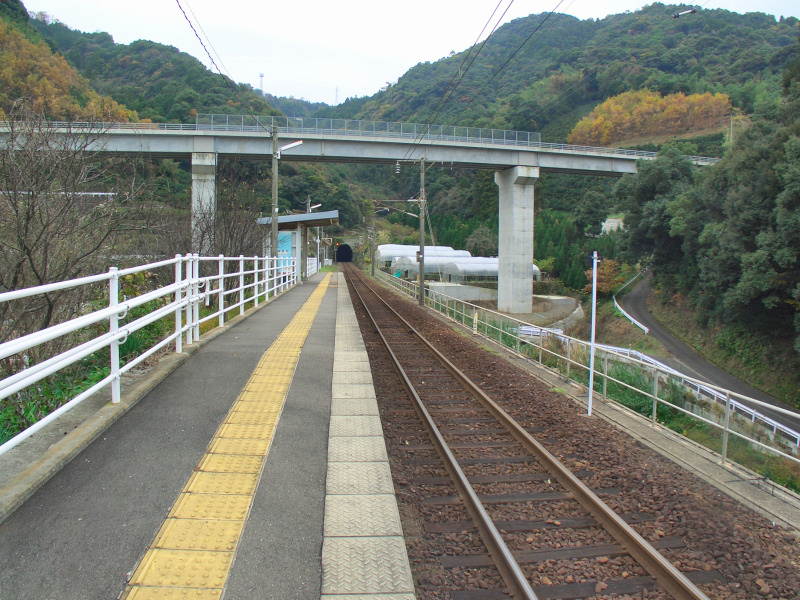
- Uminoura station platform and track in 2008

General information
- Location: Uminoura, Ashikita-machi, Ashikita-gun, Kumamoto-ken 869-5304; Japan
- Coordinates: 32.32797°N 130.48869°E
- Operator: Hisatsu Orange Railway Co., Ltd.
- Line: Hisatsu Orange Railway
- Distance: 26.7 km from Yatsushiro; 3.1 km from Higo Tanoura
- Platforms: 1 side platform
- Tracks: 1

Construction
- Structure type: At-grade

Other information
- Station code: OR08
- Website: Official (in Japanese)

History
- Opened: 1 June 1959
- Original company: Japanese National Railways

Passengers
- FY2019: 29
Location
- Location within Kumamoto Prefecture Location within Japan

Uminoura Station (海浦駅, Uminoura-eki) is a passenger railway station in the town of Agukita, Kumamoto Prefecture, Japan. It is served by the third-sector railway company Hisatsu Orange Railway

== Lines ==
The station is served by the Hisatsu Orange Railway Line that follows the former coastal route of the JR Kyushu Kagoshima Main Line connecting Yatsushiro and Sendai. It is located 26.7 km from the starting point of the line at Yatsushiro.

== Station layout ==
The station consists of oneside platform at street level, serving a single bi-directional tracks. There is no station building, but only an open-fronted shelter on the platform. It is unattended.

== Gallery ==
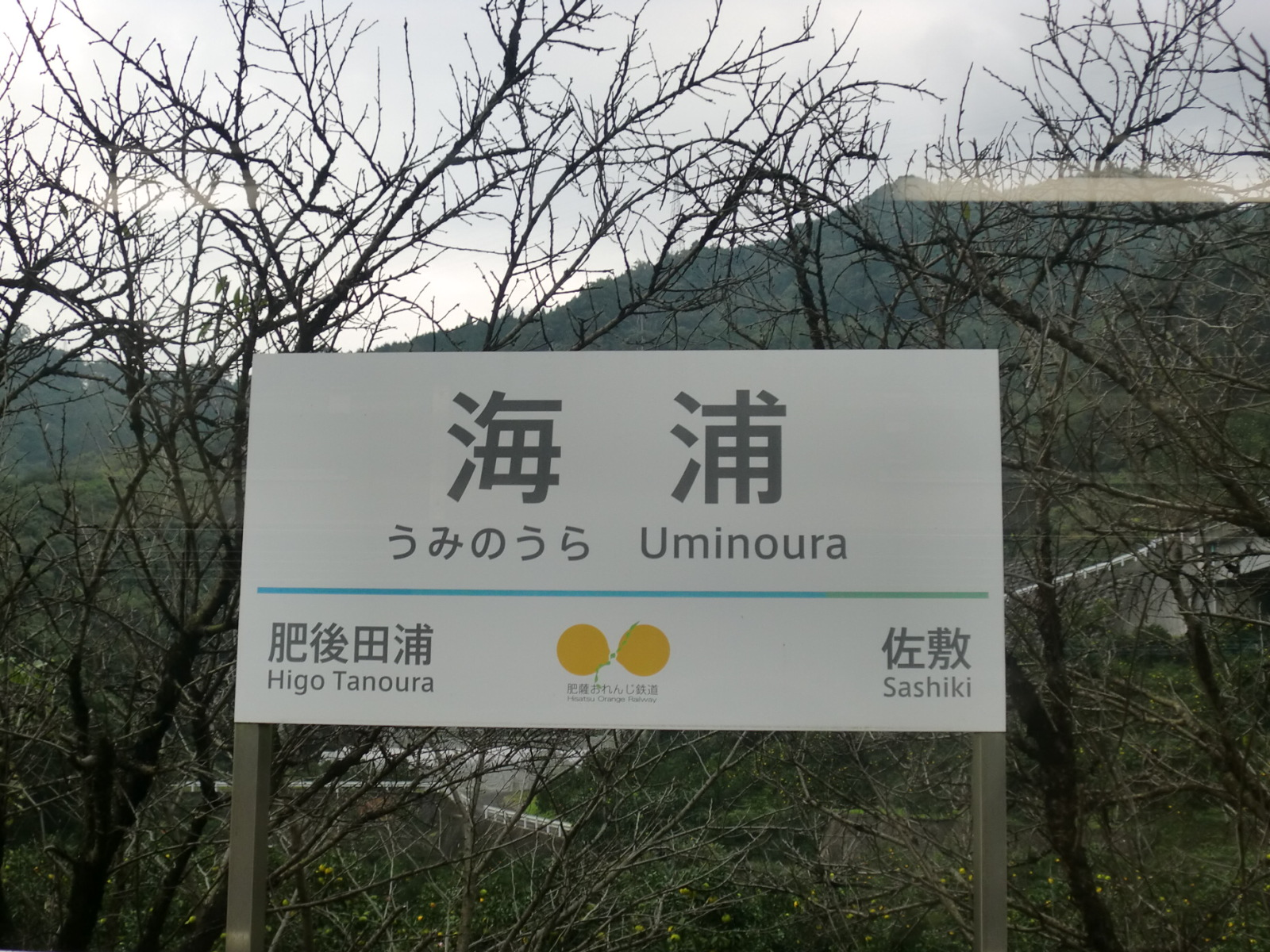
Station sign

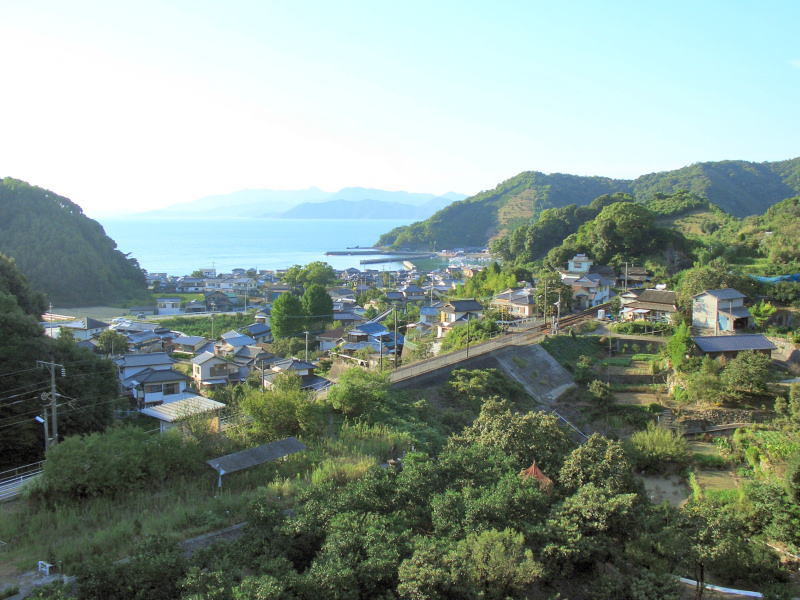
Landscape surrounding station

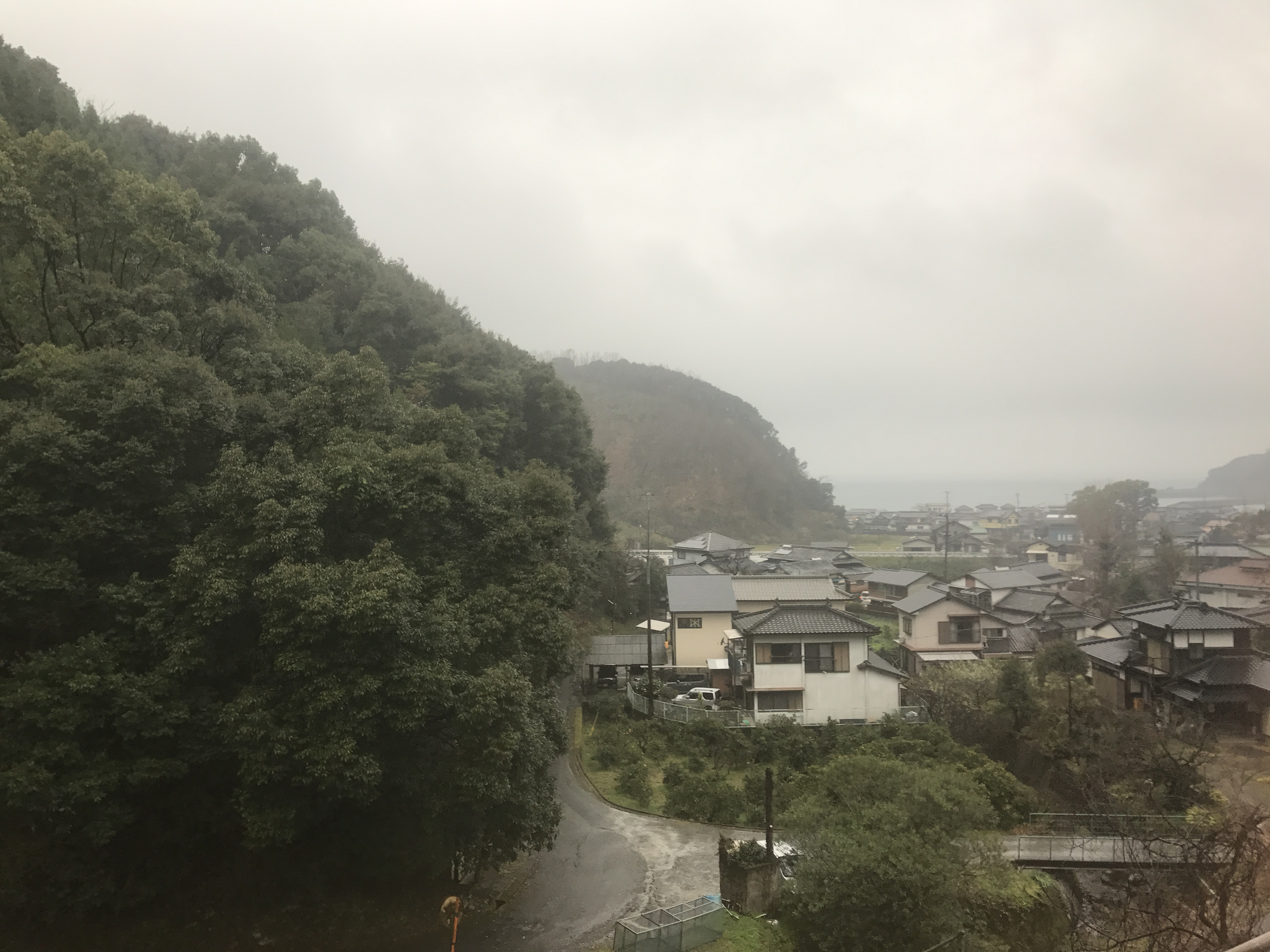
View from train approaching station

== Adjacent stations ==
«	Service	»
Hisatsu Orange Railway Line
Higo Tanoura	–	Sashiki
Rapid Express Super Orange: Does not stop at this station

== History ==
Umiura Station was opened on 1 June 1959 as a station on the Japan National Railways (JNR) Kagoshima Main Line. With the privatization of the JNR on 1 April 1987, the station was transferred to JR Kyushu. On 13 March 2004, with the opening of the Kyushu Shinkansen, the station was transferred to the Hisatsu Orange Railway.

== Passenger statistics ==
The average daily passenger traffic in fiscal 2019 was 29 passengers.

== Surrounding area ==
- Umiura Fishing Port
- Japan National Route 3

== See also ==
- List of railway stations in Japan
