= Hisatsu Orange Railway =

Japanese third-sector railway company

Hisatsu Orange Railway Line
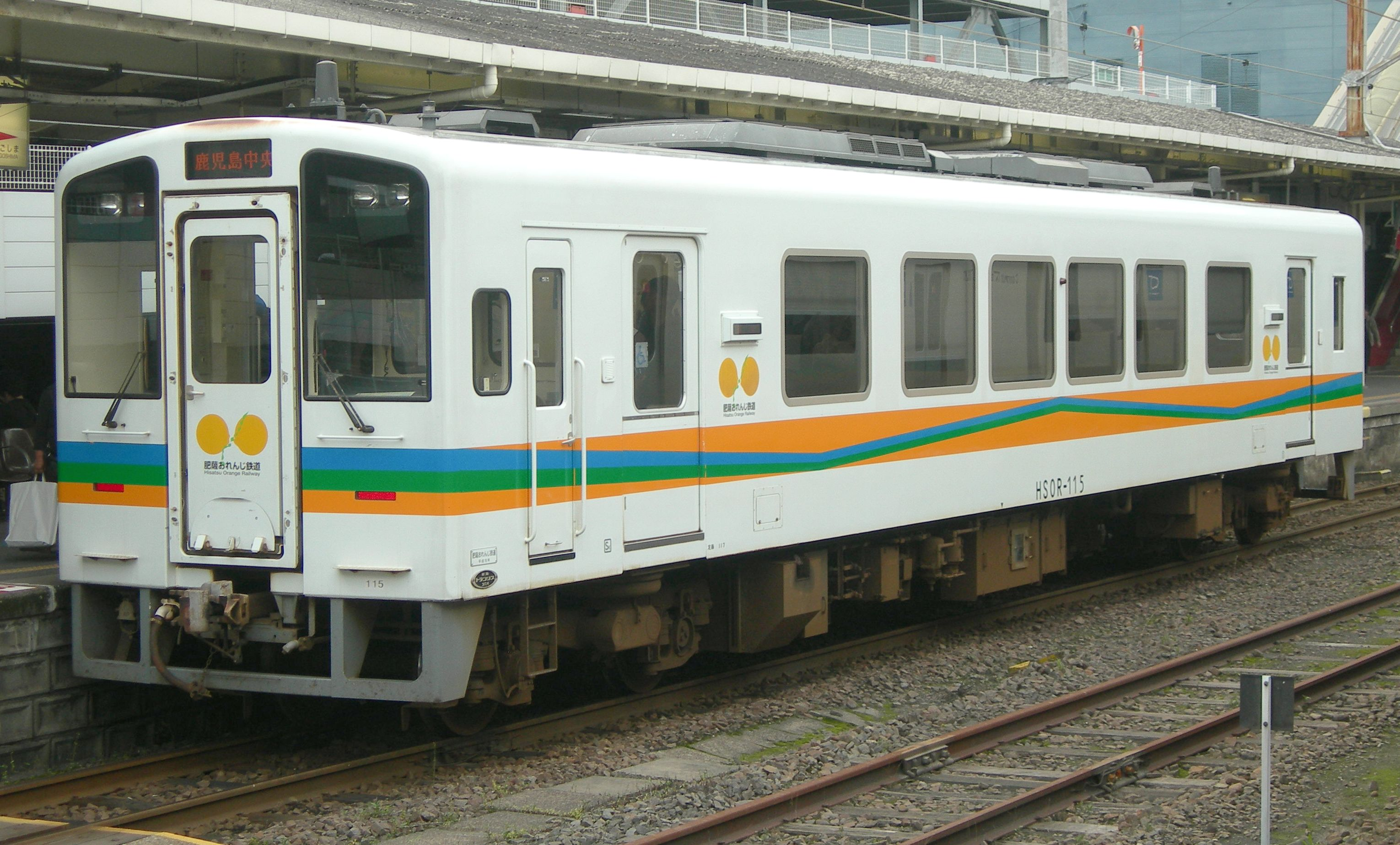
- Hisatsu Orange Railway 100 series train

Hisatsu Orange Railway Co., Ltd. (肥薩おれんじ鉄道株式会社, Hisatsu Orenji Tetsudō Kabushiki-gaisha) is a third-sector railway company which operates Hisatsu Orange Railway Line in Kumamoto and Kagoshima Prefecture. The line follows the former part of the JR Kyushu Kagoshima Main Line that connected Yatsushiro and Sendai in the Kumamoto and Kagoshima Prefectures, known historically as the Higo and Satsuma Provinces. The length of the line is 116.9 km.

Hisatsu Orange Railway went into service on 13 March 2004, when ownership was transferred from JR and the high speed Kyushu Shinkansen service began. The Hisatsu Orange Railway runs close to the Yatsushiro Sea and East China Sea and connects to the Kagoshima Main Line on both ends. The route is indirect and winding, but connects several cities along the coast.

Although the line is electrified and used by electric freight trains, due to budgetary limitations, passenger service is provided by diesel railcars.

Shareholders in the railway include the prefectures of Kumamoto and Kagoshima, the cities of Yatsushiro, Minamata, Izumi, Akune and Satsumasendai, the towns of Tsunagi and Ashikita, and the Japan Freight Railway Company.

== History ==
The Sendai–Yatsushiro section was built by the (then) Japanese Imperial Railway and opened between 1922 and 1927, at which time this route replaced the Hisatsu Line to become the southern part of the Kagoshima Main Line.

The Yunoura–Tsunagi section was duplicated between 1966 and 1968. CTC signalling was commissioned from Yatsushiro–Sendai in 1969/70, and the line was electrified in 1970.

In 2004, following the opening of the Kagoshima–Shin Yatsushiro section of the Kyushu Shinkansen, operation of the section was transferred under the Third Sector arrangements.

=== Former connecting lines ===
Minamata Station: The first section of the Yamano line was opened from Kurino (on the Hisatsu Line) 24 km to Yamano in 1921. The 14 km Minamata–Kugino section opened in 1934, and the 10 km Yamato–Satsuma section the following year. In 1937 the 8 km Kugino–Satsuma section, including the Okawa spiral opened. Freight services ceased in 1986, and the line closed in 1988.

== Hisatsu Orange Railway Line ==
JR Freight operates the Hisatsu Orange Railway Line as a Category-2 operator.

=== Overview ===
- Length: 116.9 km
- Gauge: 1,067 mm (3 ft 6 in)
- Number of Stations: 28
- Track
  - Double: between Yunoura and Tsunagi
  - Single: the rest of the line
- Electrification: 20 kV AC, 60 Hz

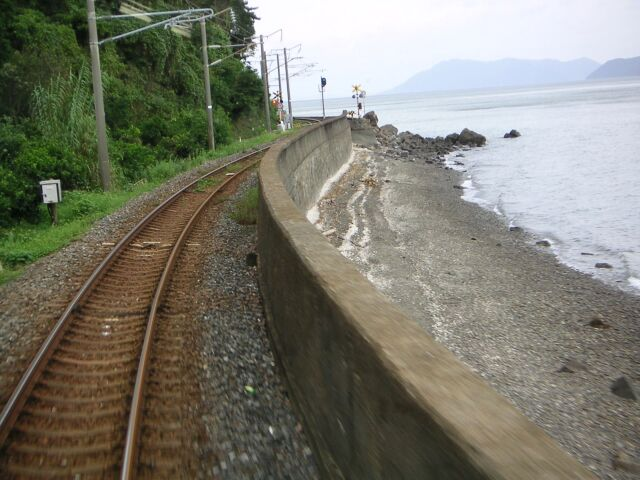
Hisatsu Orange Railway Line, between Higo-Futami and Kami-Tanoura

=== Stations ===
- ● = Trains stop
- | = Trains pass
- The stations are going to be stopped by all trains from 13 March 2021.

| No. | Station | | Distance (km) | Rapid Express Super Orange | Rapid Express Ocean Liner Satsuma | Connections | Location | |
|---|---|---|---|---|---|---|---|---|
| Kagoshima Main Line | | | | | | | Kumamoto; Prefecture | Yatsushiro |
| through to | | | | Kumamoto | | | Kumamoto; Prefecture | Yatsushiro |
| | Shin-Yatsushiro | 新八代 | 2.8 | ｜ | | Kyushu Shinkansen ■ Kagoshima Main Line | Kumamoto; Prefecture | Yatsushiro |
| Hisatsu Orange Railway Line | | | | | | | Kumamoto; Prefecture | Yatsushiro |
| OR01 | Yatsushiro | 八代 | 0.0 | ● | | ■ Kagoshima Main Line ■ Hisatsu Line (Ebi-no-kōgen Line) | Kumamoto; Prefecture | Yatsushiro |
| OR02 | Higo Kouda | 肥後高田 | 4.8 | ｜ | | | Kumamoto; Prefecture | Yatsushiro |
| OR03 | Hinagu Onsen | 日奈久温泉 | 10.1 | ● | | | Kumamoto; Prefecture | Yatsushiro |
| OR04 | Higo Futami | 肥後二見 | 13.7 | ｜ | | | Kumamoto; Prefecture | Yatsushiro |
| OR05 | Kami Tanoura | 上田浦 | 18.0 | ｜ | | | Kumamoto; Prefecture | Ashikita |
| OR06 | Tanoura Otachimisaki Park | たのうら御立岬公園 | 22.1 | ｜ | | | Kumamoto; Prefecture | Ashikita |
| OR07 | Higo Tanoura | 肥後田浦 | 23.6 | ｜ | | | Kumamoto; Prefecture | Ashikita |
| OR08 | Uminoura | 海浦 | 26.7 | ｜ | | | Kumamoto; Prefecture | Ashikita |
| OR09 | Sashiki | 佐敷 | 29.8 | ● | | | Kumamoto; Prefecture | Ashikita |
| OR10 | Yunoura | 湯浦 | 33.7 | ｜ | | | Kumamoto; Prefecture | Ashikita |
| OR11 | Tsunagi | 津奈木 | 42.4 | ｜ | | | Kumamoto; Prefecture | Tsunagi |
| OR12 | Shin-Minamata | 新水俣 | 45.8 | ｜ | | Kyushu Shinkansen | Kumamoto; Prefecture | Minamata |
| OR13 | Minamata | 水俣 | 49.6 | ● | | | Kumamoto; Prefecture | Minamata |
| OR14 | Fukuro | 袋 | 55.4 | ｜ | | | Kumamoto; Prefecture | Minamata |
| OR15 | Komenotsu | 米ノ津 | 61.3 | ｜ | | | Kagoshima; Prefecture | Izumi |
| OR16 | Izumi | 出水 | 65.6 | ● | ● | Kyushu Shinkansen | Kagoshima; Prefecture | Izumi |
| OR17 | Nishi-Izumi | 西出水 | 68.3 | | ｜ | | Kagoshima; Prefecture | Izumi |
| OR18 | Takaono | 高尾野 | 72.1 | | ● | | Kagoshima; Prefecture | Izumi |
| OR19 | Nodagou | 野田郷 | 75.3 | | ● | | Kagoshima; Prefecture | Izumi |
| OR20 | Origuchi | 折口 | 80.7 | | ｜ | | Kagoshima; Prefecture | Akune |
| OR21 | Akune | 阿久根 | 86.2 | | ● | | Kagoshima; Prefecture | Akune |
| OR22 | Ushinohama | 牛ノ浜 | 92.2 | | ｜ | | Kagoshima; Prefecture | Akune |
| OR23 | Satsuma Ohkawa | 薩摩大川 | 95.7 | | ｜ | | Kagoshima; Prefecture | Akune |
| OR24 | Nishikata | 西方 | 99.6 | | ｜ | | Kagoshima; Prefecture | Satsumasendai |
| OR25 | Satsuma Taki | 薩摩高城 | 102.3 | | ｜ | | Kagoshima; Prefecture | Satsumasendai |
| OR26 | Kusamichi | 草道 | 107.3 | | ｜ | | Kagoshima; Prefecture | Satsumasendai |
| OR27 | Kami Sendai | 上川内 | 113.7 | | ● | | Kagoshima; Prefecture | Satsumasendai |
| OR28 | Sendai | 川内 | 116.9 | | ● | Kyushu Shinkansen ■ Kagoshima Main Line | Kagoshima; Prefecture | Satsumasendai |
| through to | | | | | Kagoshima-Chūō | | | |

== Discount tickets ==
Hisatsu Orange Railway's Orange 18 Free Kippu, priced at 2100 yen, is sold to customers carrying JR's corresponding Seishun 18 Kippu.

== See also ==
- List of railway lines in Japan
