= Ashikita, Kumamoto =

Ashikita 芦北町
- Town
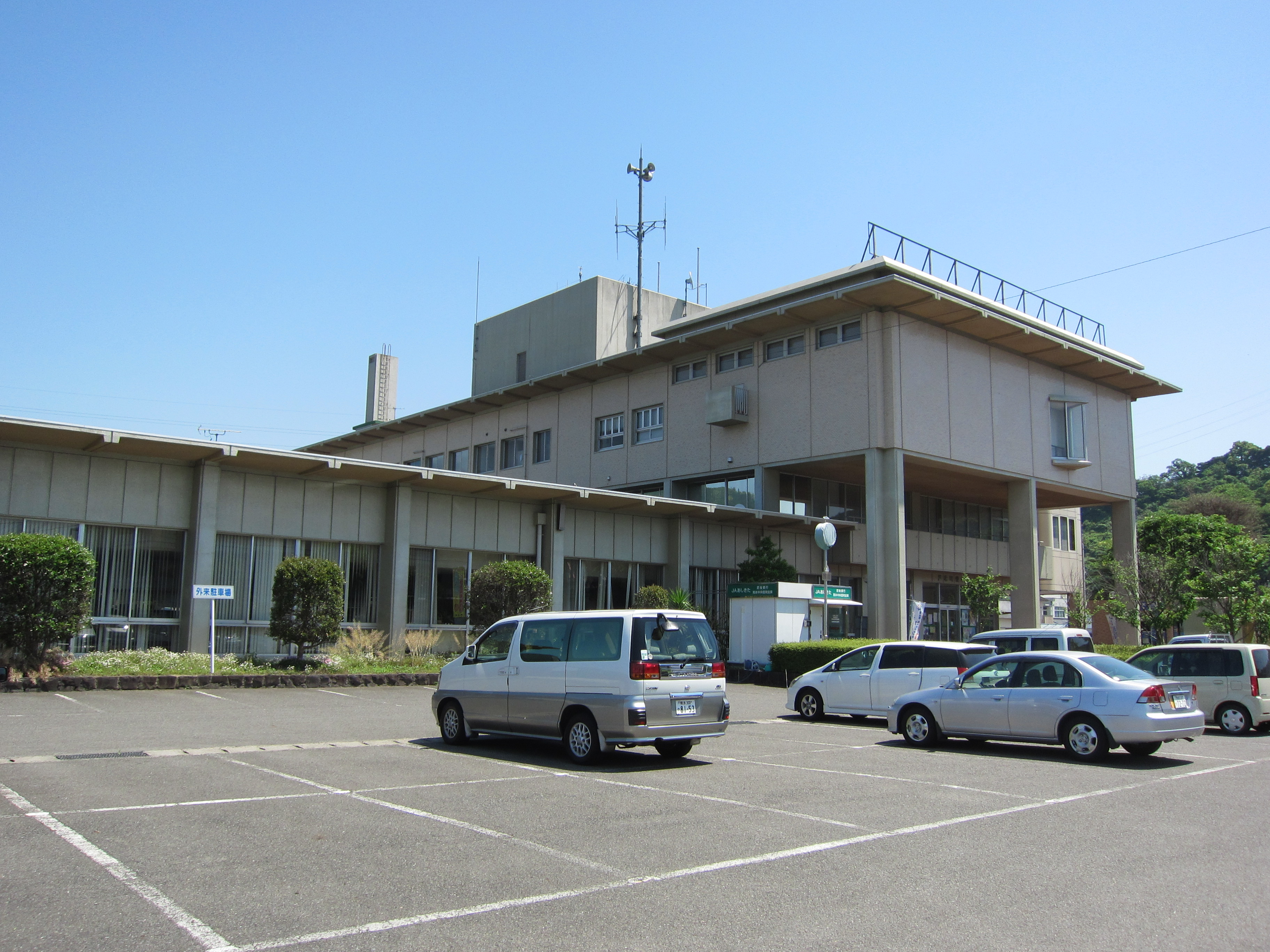
- Ashikita Town Hall

- Flag Emblem
- Interactive map of Ashikita
- Location in Japan
- Coordinates: 32°17′58″N 130°29′35″E
- Country: Japan
- Region: Kyushu
- Prefecture: Kumamoto
- District: Ashikita

Government
  - Mayor: Mr. Kazunari Takezaki

Area
  - Total: 234.01 km^{2} (90.35 sq mi)

Population (August 1, 2024)
  - Total: 15,024
  - Density: 64.202/km^{2} (166.28/sq mi)
- Time zone: UTC+09:00 (JST)
- City hall address: 2015 Ashikita, Ashikita-machi, Ashikita-gun, Kumamoto-ken 869-5498
- Website: Official website

Ashikita (芦北町, Ashikita-machi) is a town located in Ashikita District (葦北郡, Ashikita-gun), Kumamoto Prefecture, Japan.As of 1 August 2024, the town had an estimated population of 15,024 in 6909 households, and a population density of 64 persons per km^{2}. The total area of the town is 34.08 km^{2} (13.16 sq mi).

== Geography ==
Ashikita is located in southwest Kumamoto Prefecture, approximately 60 km southwest of the prefectural capital at Kumamoto City. It faces the Yatsushiro Sea to the west, and the Kuma RIver flows through the town.The municipality governs the 7th largest area within the prefecture.

=== Neighboring municipalities ===
Kumamoto Prefecture

- Kuma
- Minamata
- Tsunagi
- Yatsushiro

== Climate ==
Ashikita has a humid subtropical climate (Köppen Cfa) characterized by warm summers and cool winters with light to no snowfall. The average annual temperature in Ashikita is 16.2 °C. The average annual rainfall is 2213 mm with September as the wettest month. The temperatures are highest on average in August, at around 26.4 °C, and lowest in January, at around 5.9 °C. Ashikita, like all regions of Kumamoto, sees the most rainfall on the island of Kyushu, particularly during the rainy season between June and July. Like most of Japan, Ashikita experiences all four seasons, including cherry blossoms from late March to April, and Autumn colors from November or December depending on the warmth of the weather. Typhoon season generally occurs between August and September, and typhoons occasionally reach Ashikita, though they often make landfall over Miyazaki or Kagoshima Prefectures to the south.

Average Annual Climate of Ashikita Town, Kumamoto, Japan
Month	Average Temperature (Celsius)		Average Rainfall	
	High	Low	Days of Rain	Rainfall (ml)
January	11	0	6	71.6
February	13	1	8	116.3
March	17	4	11	155.7
April	22	9	10	191.7
May	26	14	9	225.3
June	28	19	15	538.2
July	32	23	14	447.7
August	33	23	10	196.7
September	30	19	9	205.9
October	25	13	7	107.4
November	19	7	7	85.4
December	13	2	7	74.6

(Data from NOAA: https://www.ncdc.noaa.gov/)

=== Demographics ===
Per Japanese census data, the population of Ashikita is as shown below

Historical population
Year	Pop.	±%
1940	28,931	—
1950	37,724	+30.4%
1960	35,777	−5.2%
1970	29,370	−17.9%
1980	27,413	−6.7%
1990	25,024	−8.7%
2000	22,373	−10.6%
2010	19,316	−13.7%
2020	15,681	−18.8%

== History ==
The area of Ashikita was part of ancient Higo Province. During the Edo Period it was part of the holdings of Kumamoto Domain, and the village of Sashiki was a post station on a highway which connected southern Kyushu with Edo. After the Meiji restoration, the villages of Sashiki, Ono, Yoshio, Yunoura and Tanoura were established in Ashikita District, Kumamoto with the creation of the modern municipalities system on April 1, 1889. On November 18, 1903, Sashiki was elevated to town status, followed by Yunoura on October 1, 1951. Sashiki merged with Ono and Yoshio on January 1, 1955, to form the town of Ashikita. Tanoura was elevated to town status on April 1, 1958. Ashikita annexed Yunoura on November 1, 1970, and merged with Tanoura on January 1, 2005.

== Government ==
Ashikita has a mayor-council form of government with a directly elected mayor and a unicameral city council of 16 members. Ashikita, together with the town of Tsunagi contributes one member to the Kumamoto Prefectural Assembly. In terms of national politics, the town is part of the Kumamoto 4th district of the lower house of the Diet of Japan.

=== Areas within Ashikita ===
Ashikita is divided into 44 areas. Communities are often spread along rivers, following the Kuma River between Yatsushiro City and Hitoyoshi City, and following the many streams that originate in Ashikita's mountains and flow out into the Yatsushiro Sea, along the town's extensive coastline. These areas include:

- Northern Tanoura region along the coast
  - Kami-Tanoura (上田浦) and Hatato (波多島) serviced by Kami-Tanoura Station on the Hisatsu Orange Railway.
  - Kodanoura (小田浦) serviced by Higo-Tanoura Station on the Hisatsu Orange Railway.
  - Imuta (井牟田)
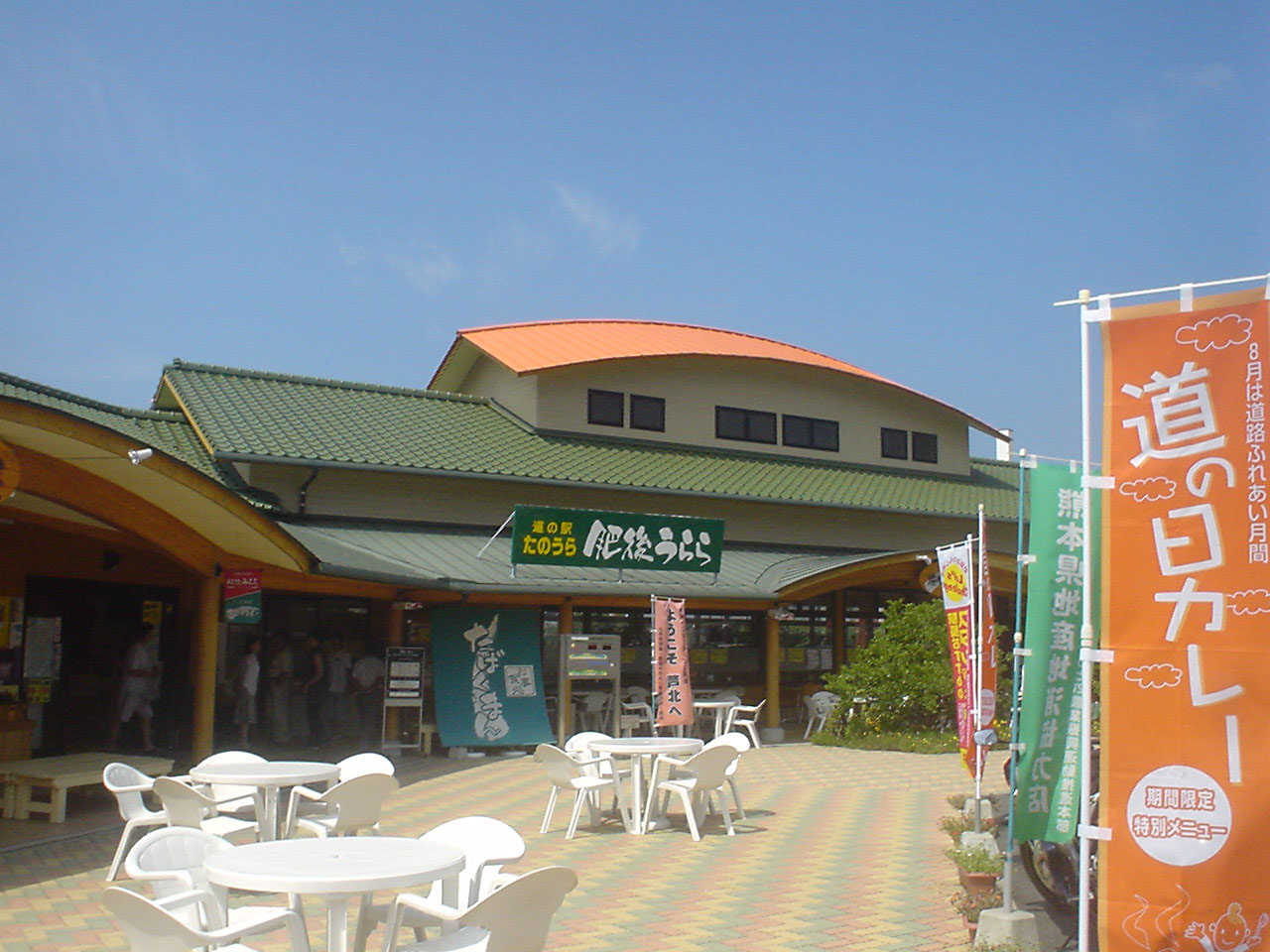
    Tanoura Rest Area
- Central Tanoura region
  - Tanouramachi (田浦町) and Tanoura (田浦) which can be accessed by the Tanoura IC, or by the Hisatsu Orange Railway from Otachimisaki Koen Station. Otachimisaki Park is located on the cape, with beaches, Otachimisaki Onsen, Ashikita Symbol Tower and recreational facilities. Tanoura Rest Area offers a food shop and restaurant for travelers. Tanoura Elementary School and Tanoura Junior High School can be found there.

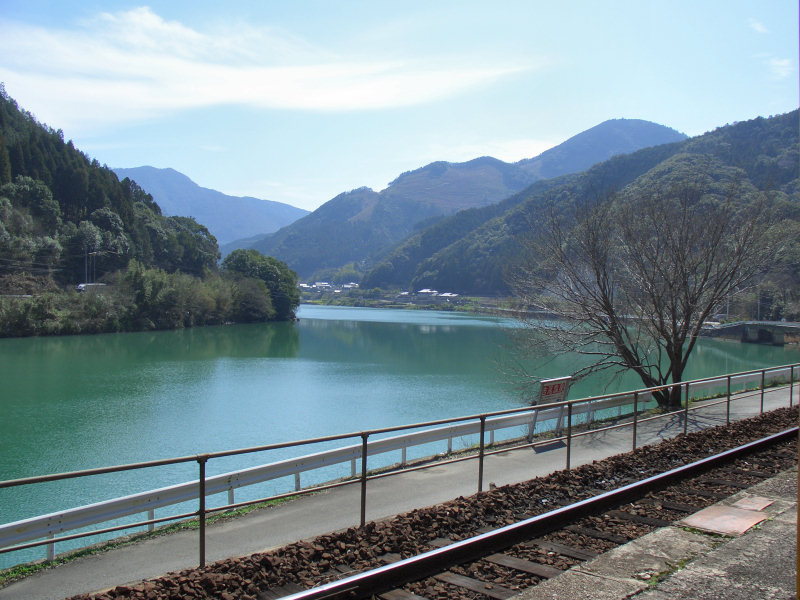
Yoshio Station

Mountainous region east of Tanoura

- Oiwa (大岩) and Kuroiwa (黒岩)
- Tachikawa (立川), Yokoigi (横居木) and Uwabara (上原)
- Region along the Kuma River
  - Yoshio (吉尾) and Ebirase (箙瀬) serviced by Yoshio Station along the JR Hisatsu Line; Yoshio Elementary School and Yoshio Onsen are located there.
  - Kaiji (海路) serviced by Kaiji Station on the JR Hisatsu Line; the location of Kaiji Elementary School.
  - Ono (大野) and Tsuge (告) - Ono Onsen Center offers an onsen, food shop and restaurant along the road to Hitoyoshi City. Ono Elementary School is located there.

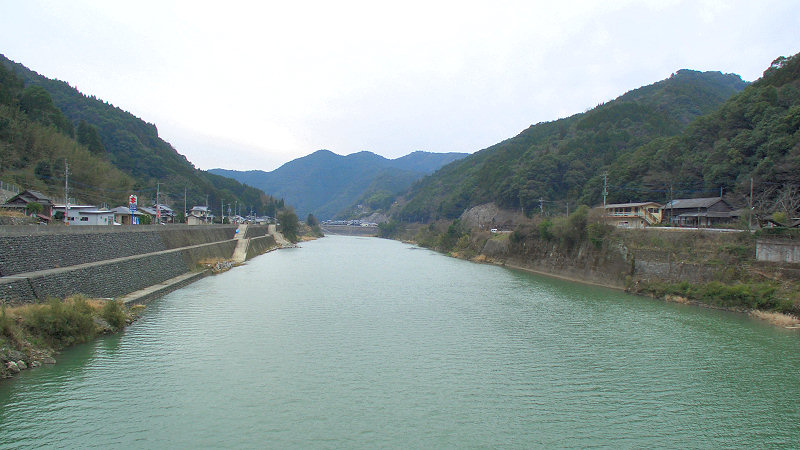
View from Shiroishi Station

- Northern Ashikita region
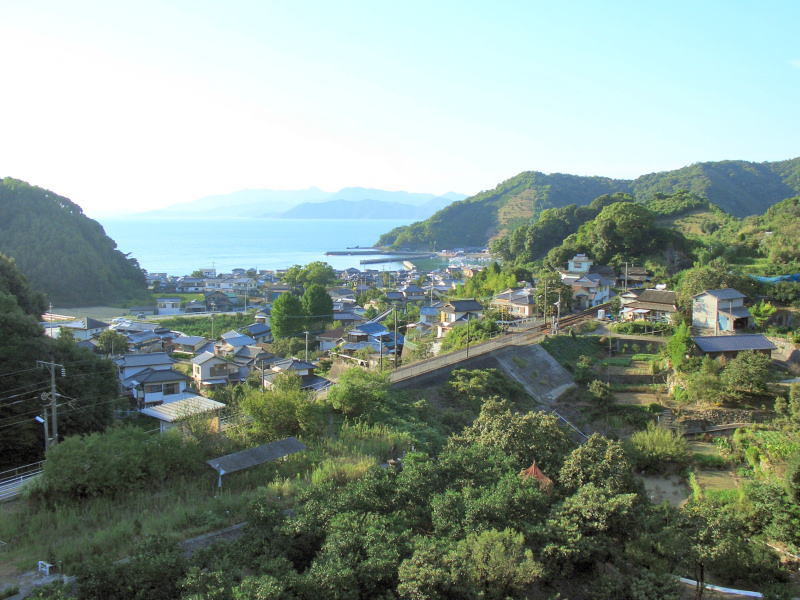
  Uminoura Station
  - Michigawachi (道川内), Fushiki (伏木氏), Matsubae (松生), Onita (大尼田) and Shiroishi (白石) with Shiroishi Station along the JR Hisatsu Line
  - Otojiya (乙千屋) where Ashikita High School is located.
- Western Ashikita region
  - Uminoura (海浦) serviced by Uminoura Station on the Hisatsu Orange Railway
  - Hakariishi (計石) and Tsurugiyama (鶴木山) with Ebi-An shrimp restaurant, Ashikita Utasebune sailing fishing boat docks, Ashikita Total Seaside Park, Tsurugiyama Swimming Beach and Ashikita Youth Center

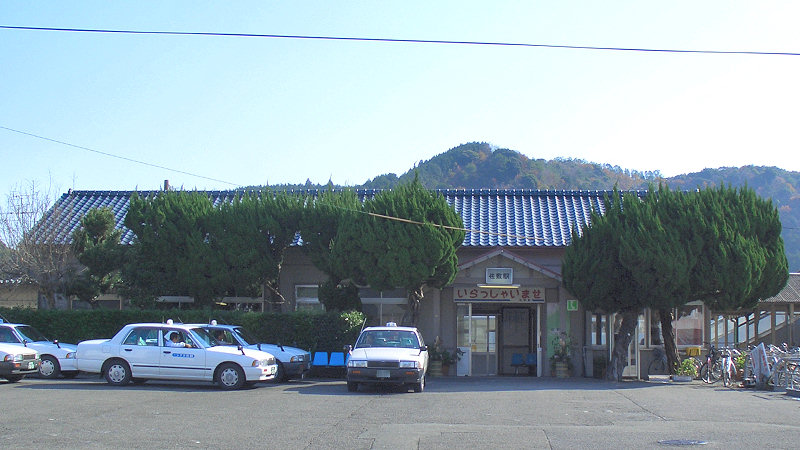
Sashiki Station

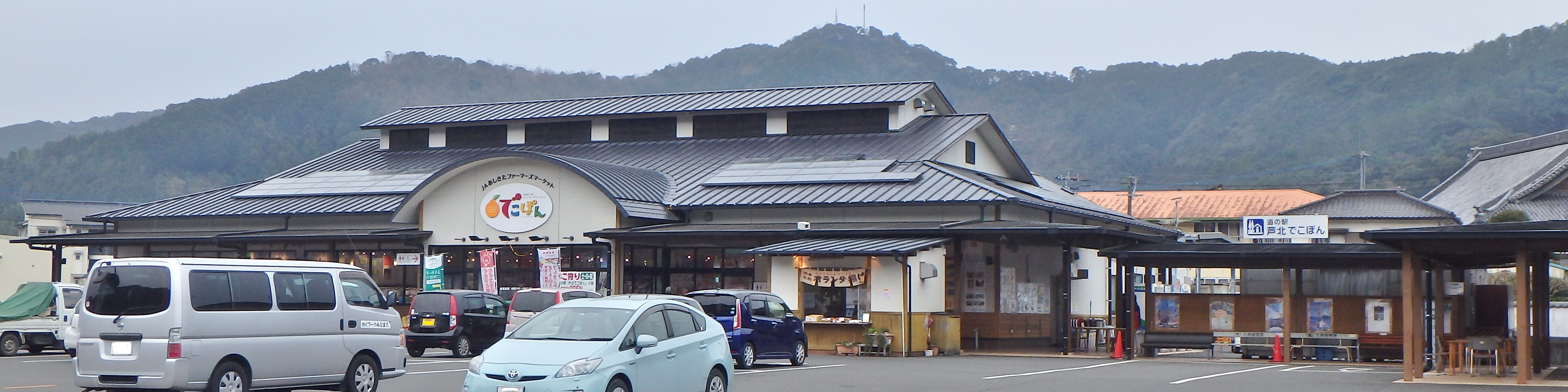
JA Ashikita Farmers' Market Dekopon Rest Area

- Central Ashikita region
  - Hanaoka (花岡)
  - Sashiki (佐敷) is accessible by the Ashikita IC, and has the Ashikita Farmers' Market Dekopon Rest Area, where travelers can buy fresh produce and local delicacies. Sashiki Station lies along the Hisatsu Orange Railway, and on nearby Shiroyama Hill sit the Shiroyama Skydome and the Sashiki Castle Ruins Historical Park. Sashiki Elementary School and Sashiki Junior High School are also located here.
  - Ashikita (芦北) is the location of the Ashikita Town Hall and the Bayside Ashikita area, where a park and a wooden boulevard can be found.

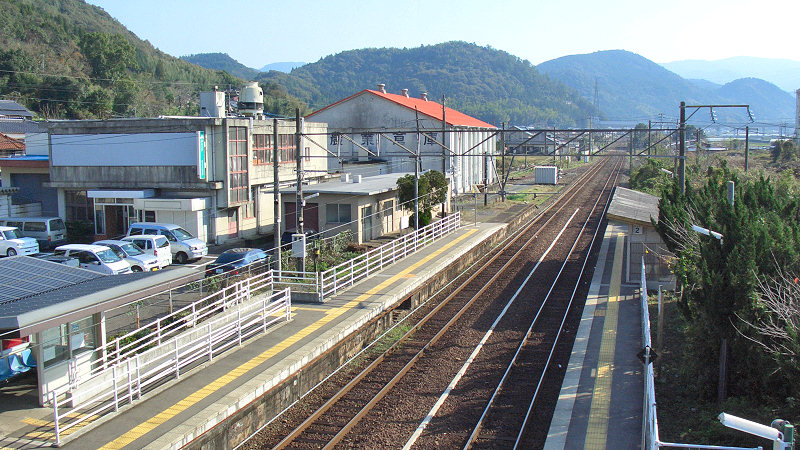
Yunoura Station

- Southern Ashikita region
  - Yunoura (湯浦) is a residential area along the Yunoura river, serviced by Yunoura Station along the Hisatsu Orange Railway. It has both Yunoura Elementary School and Yunoura Junior High School. Yunoura Onsen and Healthy Park pool and onsen can also be found there.
  - Meshima (女島) has the Meshima Yumemoyai Center.
- Eastern Ashikita mountainous region
  - Amatsuki (天月), Shiraki (白木), Ichinose (市野瀬), Kuwabara (桑原), Shioshitashi (塩浸), Miyanoura (宮浦) and Yahata (八幡).
- Region east of Yunoura
  - Tagawa (田川), Miyazaki (宮﨑) and Toyooka (豊岡)
  - Okawachi (大川内) where Uchino Elementary School is located.
- Region south of Ono
  - Yoneda (米田), Takaoka (高岡), Furuishi (古石), Kunimi (国見) and Maruyama (丸山).

== Economy ==
The economy of Ashikita is mainly agriculture and commercial fishing. Ashikita is famous for its fresh local produce, in particular dekopon oranges (also known as shiranui), and amanatsu oranges. It also has iconic sailboats called utasebune (打たせ船) which fish for famous cutlassfish (太刀魚 tachiuo) and red-footed shrimp (足赤海老 ashiaka ebi). Other local delicacies include Ashikita beef, Otachimisaki salt, Ozeki rice and Ozeki shochu (sake).

== Education ==
Ashikita has five public elementary school and three public junior high school operated by the town government, and one public high school operated by the Kumamoto Prefectural Board of Education. The prefecture also operates one special education school for the handicapped.

High Schools:

- Ashikita High School (熊本県立芦北高等学校)

Junior High Schools:

- Tanoura Junior High School (田浦中学校)
- Sashiki Junior High School (佐敷中学校)
- Yunoura Junior High School (湯浦中学校)

Elementary Schools:

- Tanoura Elementary School (田浦小学校)
- Sashiki Elementary School (佐敷小学校)
- Ono Elementary School (大野小学校)
- Yunoura Elementary School (湯浦小学校)
- Uchino Elementary School (内野小学校)

Special needs schools:

- Ashikita Special Needs School (熊本県立芦北支援学校) (for students with disabilities)

== Transportation ==
=== Railways ===
JR Kyushu - Hisatsu Line

■ - Kaiji - Yoshio - Shiroishi (operations suspended)

Hisatsu Orange Railway

- Kami Tanoura - Tanoura Otachimisaki Park - Higo-Tanoura - Uminoura - Sashiki - Yunoura

=== Highways ===
- Minamikyushu Expressway
- National Route 3
- National Route 219

== Local attractions ==
- Utasebune fishing boat tours
- Sashiki Castle Ruins, National Historic Site
- Otachimisaki Park Beach
- Ashikita Marine Park Beach
- Ashikita Hoshino Tomihiro Art Museum - sister museum to Midori City Hoshino Tomihiro Art Museum
- Sekishokan (赤松館) cultural heritage site
- Nozaka Bay
- Sashiki Suwa Jinja Shrine
- Yunoura Suwa Jinja Shrine
- Tanoura Aso Jinja Shrine

The town was listed on Anime Tourism 88's list of anime sightseeing spots. Ashikita is the setting for the fishing anime and manga Diary of Our Days at the Breakwater. Some notable places are the Tsurugiyama Harbor (the location of the club room and titular breakwater), Tsurugiyama Beach, and the Tenguya Fishing Store.

=== Festivals and events ===
- January: New Year shrine celebrations, Ashikita Town School Music Festival
- February: Utase-hai Junior Karate Competition, Ashikita Marathon, Ashikita Utasebune Festival
- March: Dekopon Festival, Ashikita Utase Marathon
- April: Yunoura Suwa Jinja Shrine Festival, Sashiki Suwa Jinja Shrine Festival
- May: Golf Tournament
- June: Volleyball Tournament, Table Tennis Tournament
- July: Ashikita Summer Festival Celebrations, Bowling Tournament, Clay Pigeon Shooting Tournament, Softball Tournament, Croquet Tournament, Sports Festival
- August: Ashikita Summer Festival Celebrations, Town Dance and Fireworks Display, Baseball Tournament, Swimming Tournament, Badminton Tournament, Beach Volleyball Tournament
- September: Golf Tournament
- October: Ashikita International Festival, Athletics Tournament, Moon Viewing Festival Noh Performance
- November: Ashikita Culture Festival

== See also ==
- 2020 Kyushu floods
