= Tanoura Otachimisaki Park Station =

Railway station in Ashikita, Kumamoto Prefecture, Japan

Tanoura Otachimisaki Park Station たのうら御立岬公園駅
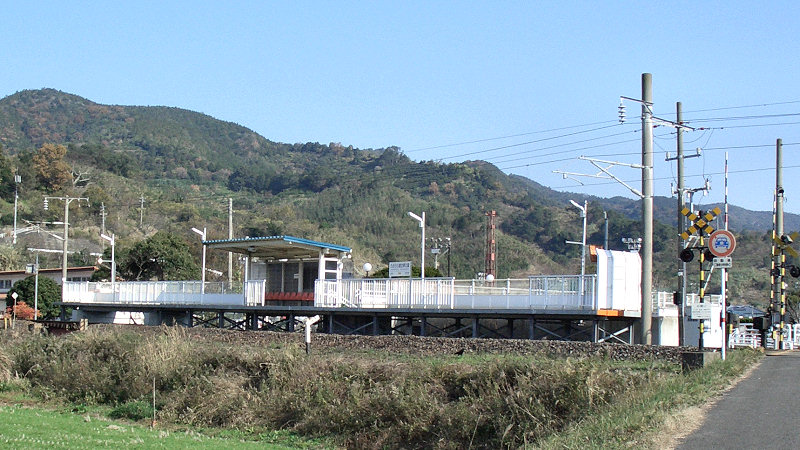
- Tanoura Otachimisaki Park Station and platform in 2006

General information
- Location: Tanouramachi, Ashikita-machi, Ashikita-gun, Kumamoto-ken 869-5305; Japan
- Coordinates: 32.36342°N 130.50659°E
- Operator: Hisatsu Orange Railway Co., Ltd.
- Line: Hisatsu Orange Railway
- Distance: 22.1 km from Yatsushiro; 4.1 km from Kami Tanoura
- Platforms: 1 side platform
- Tracks: 1

Construction
- Structure type: At-grade

Other information
- Station code: OR06
- Website: Official (in Japanese)

History
- Opened: 1 March 2005
- Original company: Hisatsu Orange Railway

Passengers
- FY2019: 131
Location
- Location within Kumamoto Prefecture Location within Japan

Tanoura Otachimisaki Park Station (たのうら御立岬公園駅, Tanoura Otachimisaki Kōen-eki) is a passenger railway station in the town of Agukita, Kumamoto Prefecture, Japan. It is served by the third-sector railway company Hisatsu Orange Railway

== Lines ==
The station is served by the Hisatsu Orange Railway Line that follows the former coastal route of the JR Kyushu Kagoshima Main Line connecting Yatsushiro and Sendai. It is located 22.1 km from the starting point of the line at Yatsushiro.

== Station layout ==
The station consists of one side platform serving a single bi-directional track. There is no station building. The station is usually unattended all day, but during the beach season, it becomes crowded with beachgoers at the nearby Misaki Beach, mainly during the summer vacation period and until the COVID crisis was attended during that period.

== Gallery ==
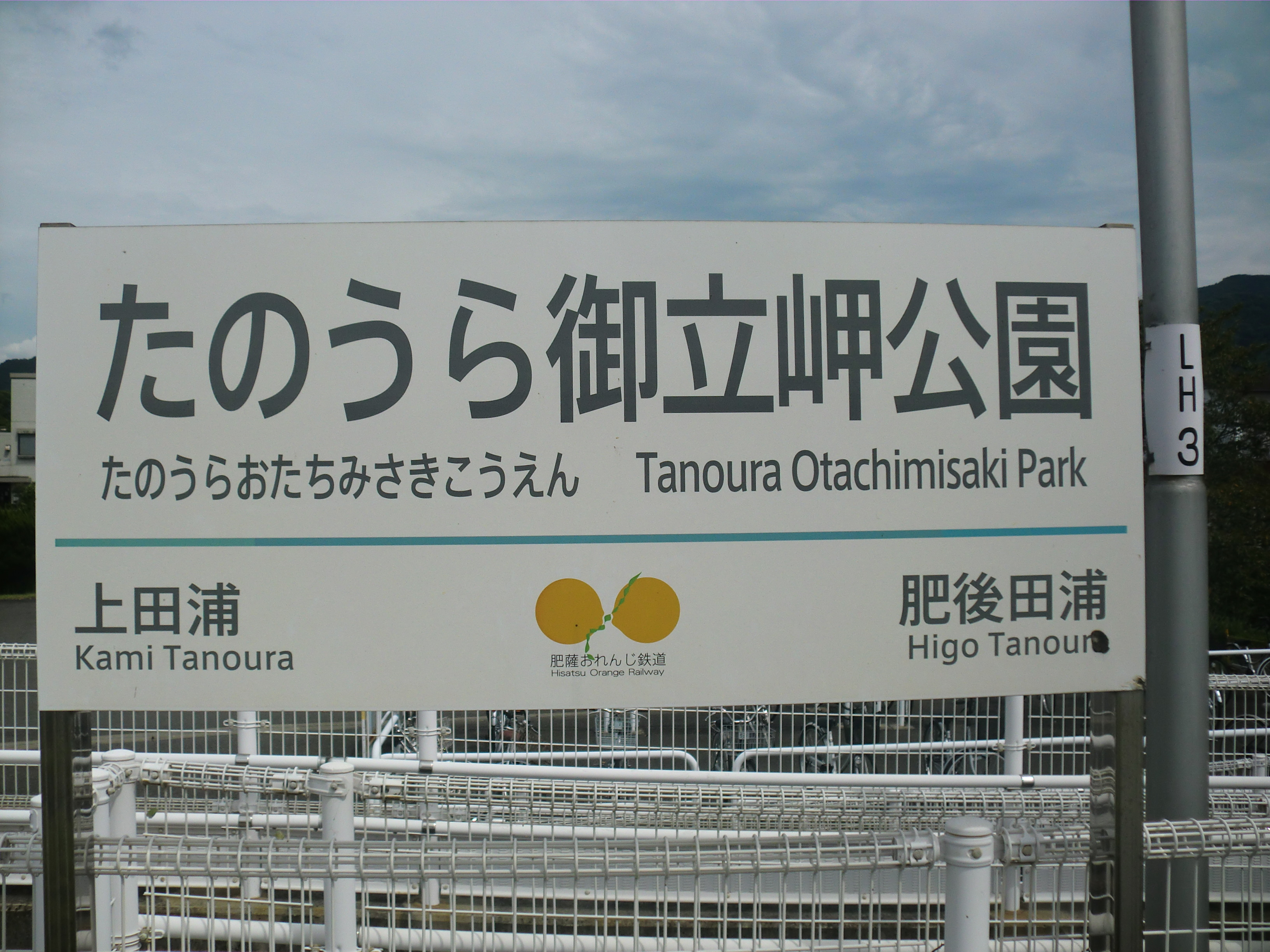
Station sign

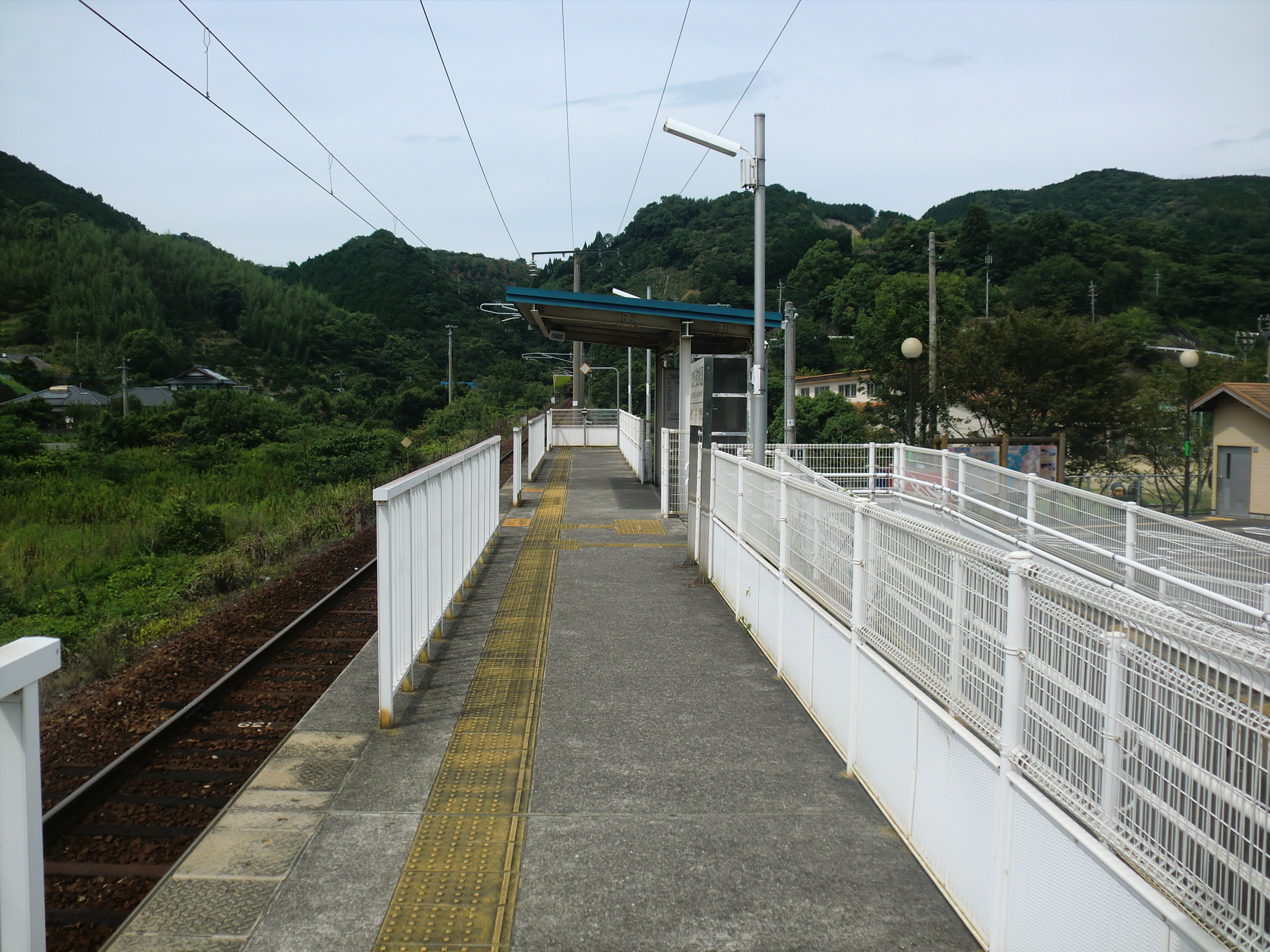
View of single platform

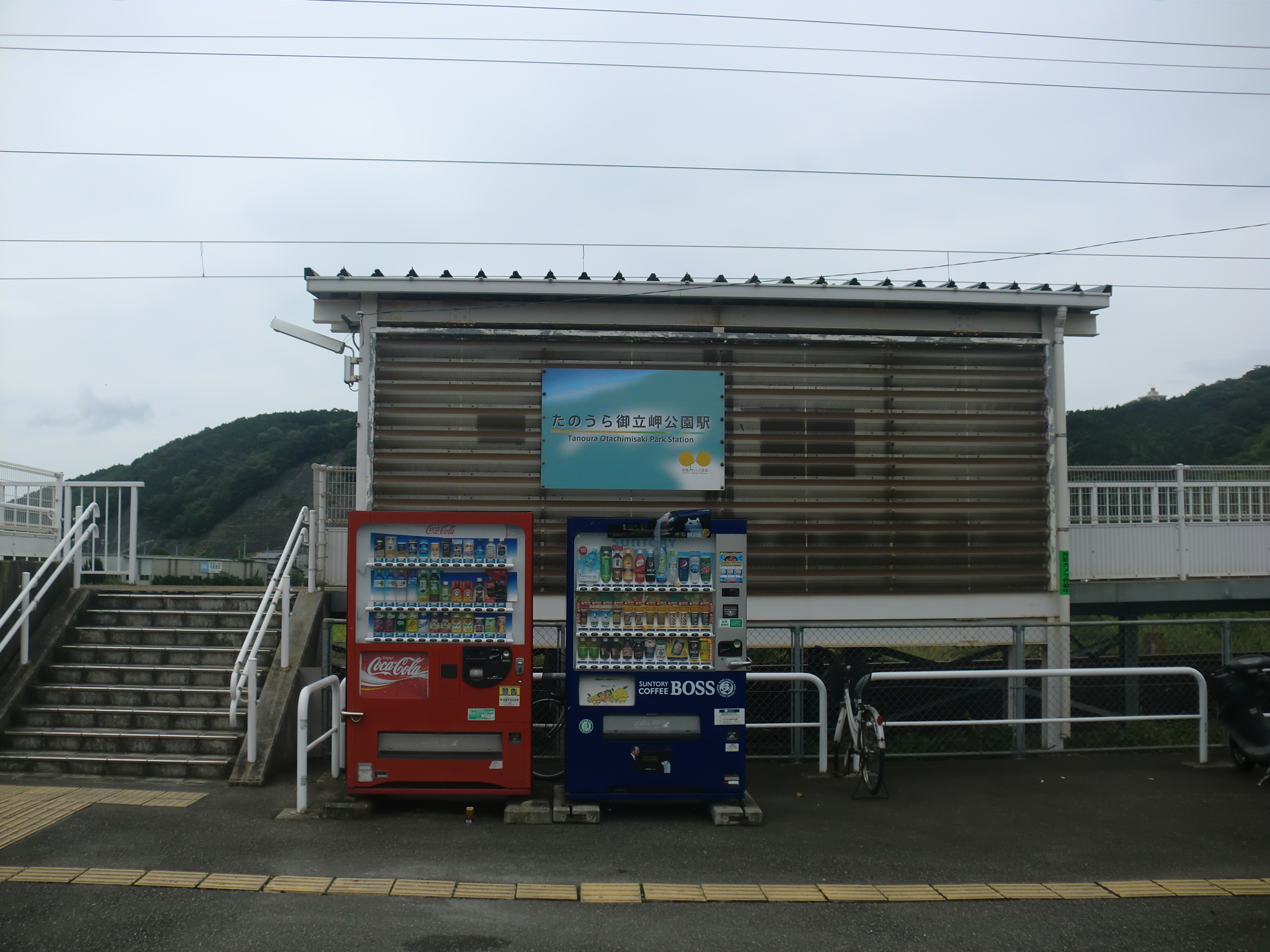
Station building

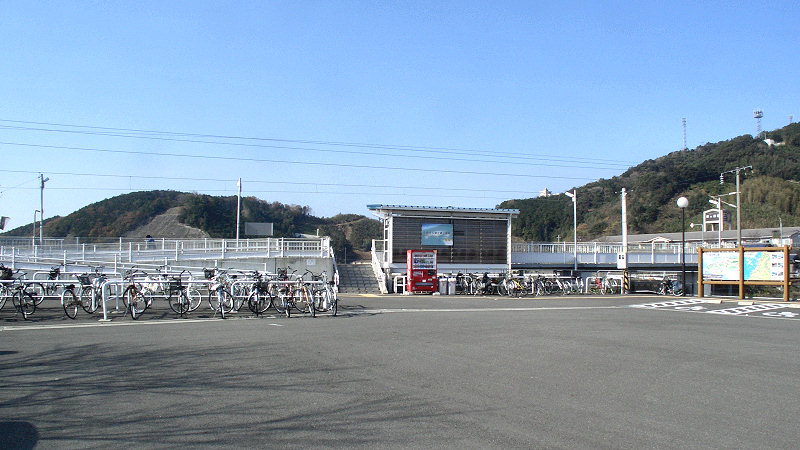
Cycle parking outside station building

== Adjacent stations ==
| « | Service | » |
Hisatsu Orange Railway Line
| Kami Tanoura | – | Higo Tanoura |

== History ==
Tanoura Otachimisaki Park Station was opened on 1 March 2005.

== Passenger statistics ==
The average daily passenger traffic in fiscal 2019 was 131 passengers.

== Surrounding area ==
- Ashikita Town Tanoura Branch Office
- Tanoura Roadside Station
- Mitakemisaki Beach

== See also ==
- List of railway stations in Japan
