= Minamata Station =

Railway station in Minamata, Kumamoto Prefecture, Japan

Minamata Station 水俣駅
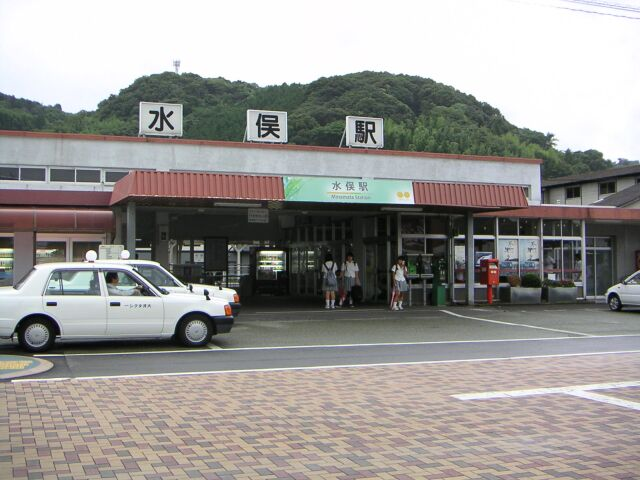
- Station entrance showing large kanji sign in 2004

General information
- Location: 1-chōme-1 Sakuraichō, Minamata-shi, Kumamoto-ken 867-0045; Japan
- Coordinates: 32.2047340°N 130.3956968°E
- Operator: Hisatsu Orange Railway Co., Ltd.
- Line: Hisatsu Orange Railway
- Distance: 49.6 km from Yatsushiro; 3.8 km from Shin-Minamata
- Platforms: 2 side platforms
- Tracks: 4

Construction
- Structure type: At-grade

Other information
- Station code: OR13
- Website: Official (in Japanese)

History
- Opened: 21 July 1926
- Original company: Japanese Government Railways

Passengers
- FY2019: 360
Location
- Location within Kumamoto Prefecture Location within Japan

Minamata Station (水俣駅, Minamata-eki) is a passenger railway station in the city of Minamata, Kumamoto Prefecture, Japan. It is served by the third-sector railway company Hisatsu Orange Railway

== Lines ==
The station is served by the Hisatsu Orange Railway Line that follows the former coastal route of the JR Kyushu Kagoshima Main Line connecting Yatsushiro and Sendai. It is located 49.6 km from the starting point of the line at Yatsushiro.

== Station layout ==
The station consists of one island platform with two tracks, one side platform with one track, and a center track (passing track). However, the center track and the outer track 3 of the island platform are currently out of service, and the station is operated as a two-side platform station, with the platforms connected by a footbridge. The station building is staffed.

=== Platforms ===
1, 2	■ ■ Hisatsu Orange Railway	for Izumi and Sendai for Yatsushiro
3	■ ■ Hisatsu Orange Railway	<not in operation>

== Gallery ==
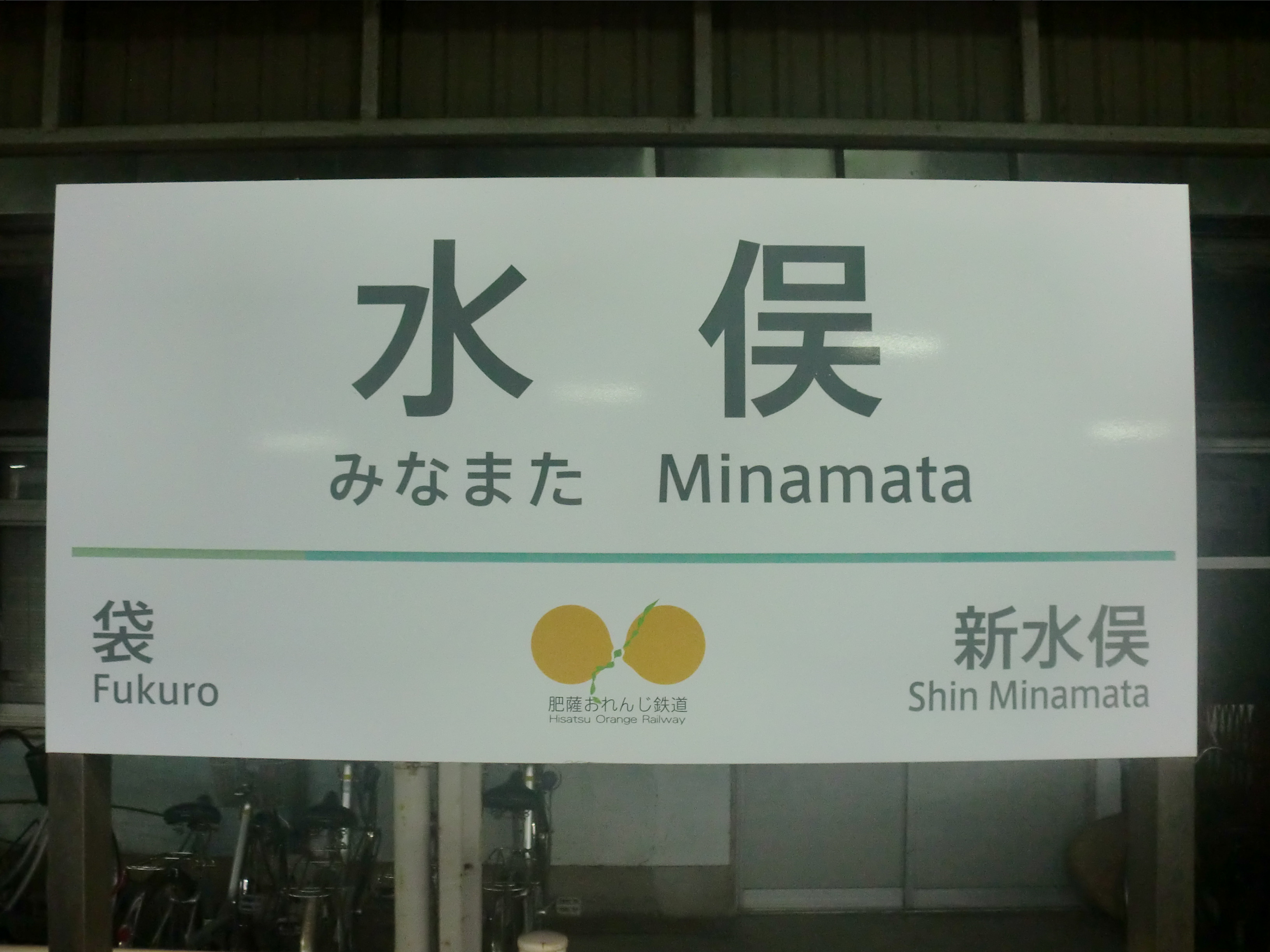
Station sign

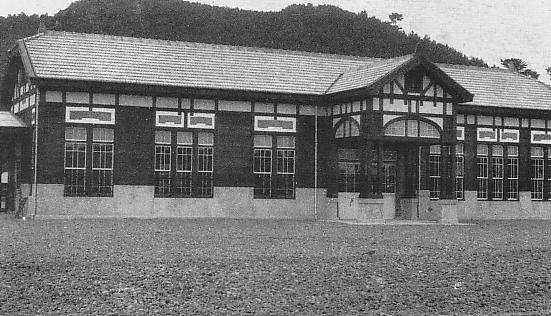
Building in Tasho and pre-war Showa era

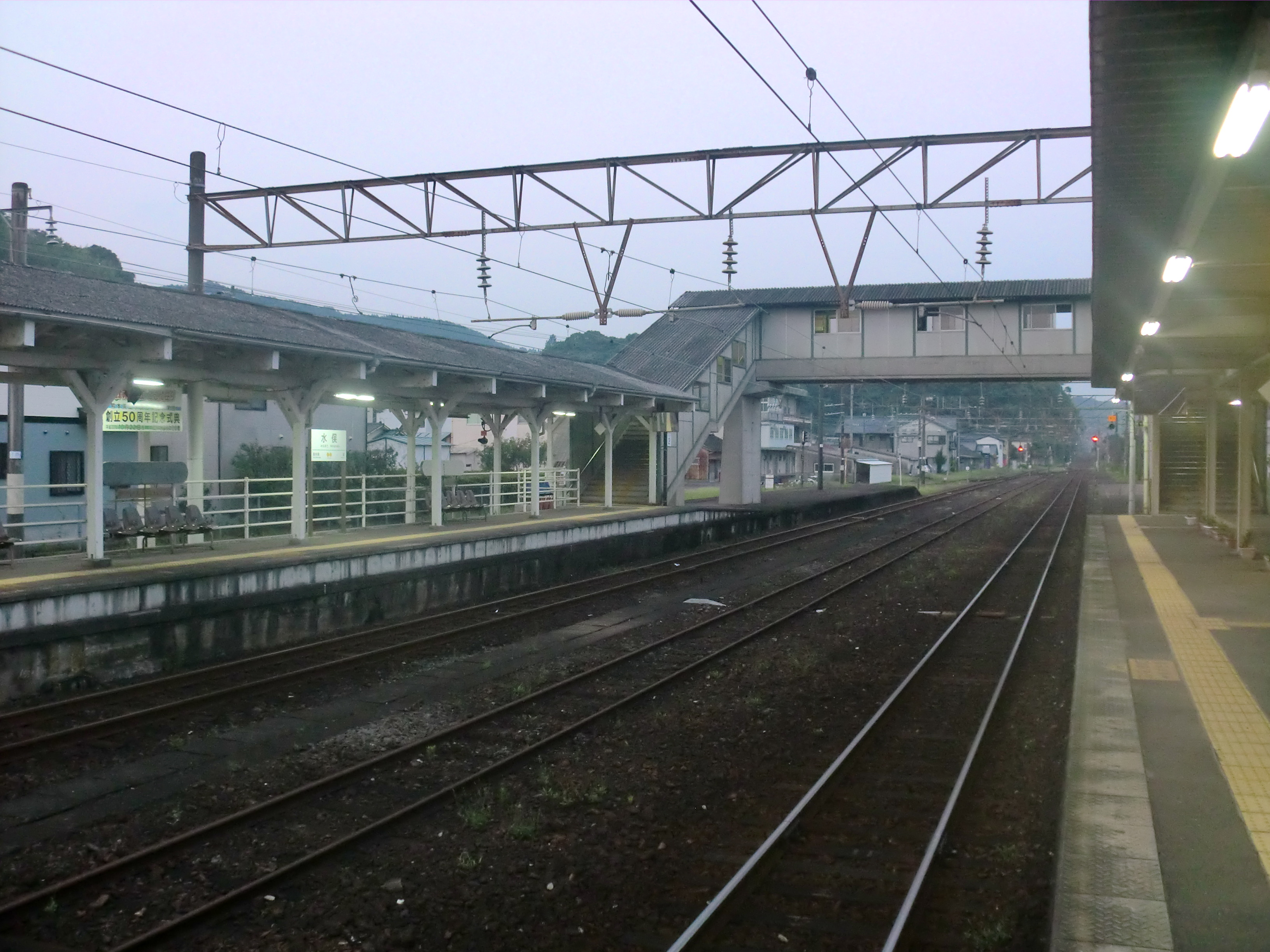
View of station platforms

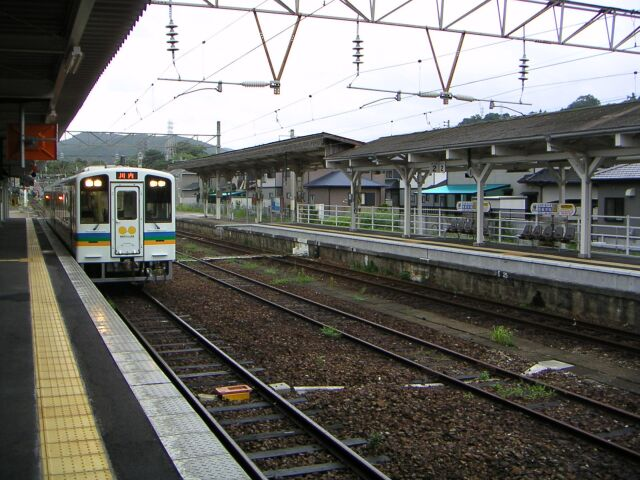
Approaching 100 series train

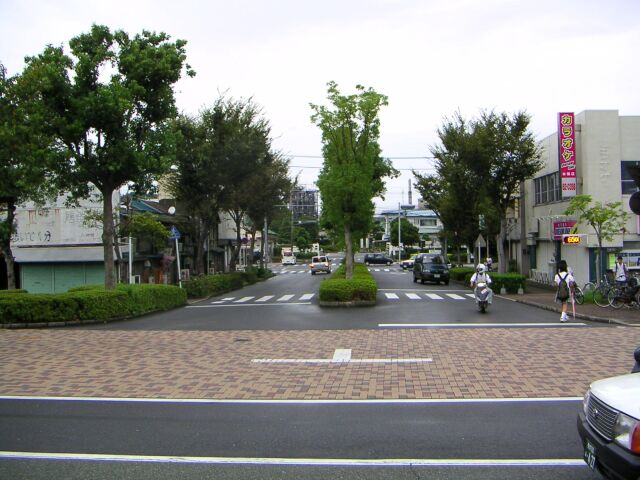
Intersection outside station

== Adjacent stations ==
«	Service	»
Hisatsu Orange Railway Line
Shin-Minamata	–	Fukuro
Sashiki	Rapid Express Super Orange	Izumi

== History ==
Minamata Station was opened on 21 July 1926 as a station on the Japanese Government Railways Kagoshima Main Line. With the privatization of the Japan National Railways on 1 April 1987, the station was transferred to JR Kyushu. On 13 March 2004, with the opening of the Kyushu Shinkansen, the station was transferred to the Hisatsu Orange Railway.

== Passenger statistics ==
The average daily passenger traffic in fiscal 2019 was 360 passengers.

== Surrounding area ==
- Minamata City Hall
- Tokutomi Soho Memorial Museum
- Minamata Port - Shishijima Kisen Ferry departs and arrives from here

== See also ==
- List of railway stations in Japan
