= Izumi Station (Kagoshima) =

Railway station in Izumi, Kagoshima Prefecture, Japan

Izumi Station 出水駅
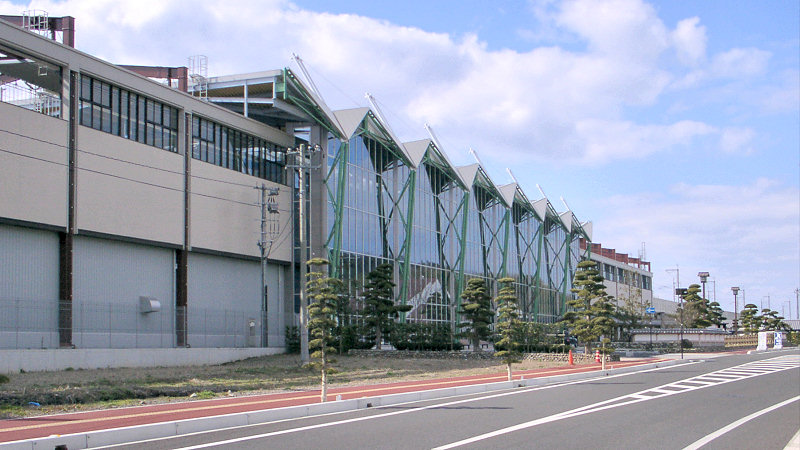
- East entrance of the Izumi Station

General information
- Location: 715-6 Kamisababuchi, Izumi-shi, Kagoshimaken
- Operator: JR Kyushu; Hisatsu Orange Railway
- Lines: Kyūshū Shinkansen; ■ Hisatsu Orange Railway Line
- Platforms: 3 side + 1 island platforms

Other information
- Station code: OR16

History
- Opened: 15 October 1923

Services
Preceding station	JR Kyushu	Following station
Sendai towards Kagoshima-Chūō	Kyūshū Shinkansen Sakura Tsubame	Shin-Minamata towards Hakata
Location
- Location within Kumamoto Prefecture Location within Japan

Izumi Station (出水駅, Izumi-eki) is a passenger railway station located in the city of Izumi, Kagoshima Prefecture, Japan. It is jointly operated by JR Kyushu and the third-sector railway company Hisatsu Orange Railway.

== Lines ==
The station is served by the Kyushu Shinkansen and is 210.0 kilometers from the starting point of the line at Hakata and 832.4 kilometers from Shin-Osaka. The station is also served by the Hisatsu Orange Railway Line that follows the former coastal route of the JR Kyushu Kagoshima Main Line connecting Yatsushiro and Sendai. It is located 65.6 km from the starting point of the line at Yatsushiro.

== Layout ==
The JR Kyushu portion of the station consists of two elevated opposed tracks, with the station facilities underneath. There are no passing tracks, so platform safety barriers are installed. The station has a Midori no Madoguchi staffed ticket office. The Hisatsu Orange Railway portion of the station consists of one side platform and one island platform. It is staffed. The two portions of the station are connected by a footbridge.

== Platforms ==
=== Hisatsu Orange Railway ===
1, 2, 3	■ ■ Hisatsu Orange Railway	for Akune and Sendai for Minamata, and Yatsushiro

=== JR Kyushu ===
11	Kyushu Shinkansen	for Kumamoto, Hakata, and Shin-Ōsaka
12	Kyushu Shinkansen	for Sendai and Kagoshima-Chūō

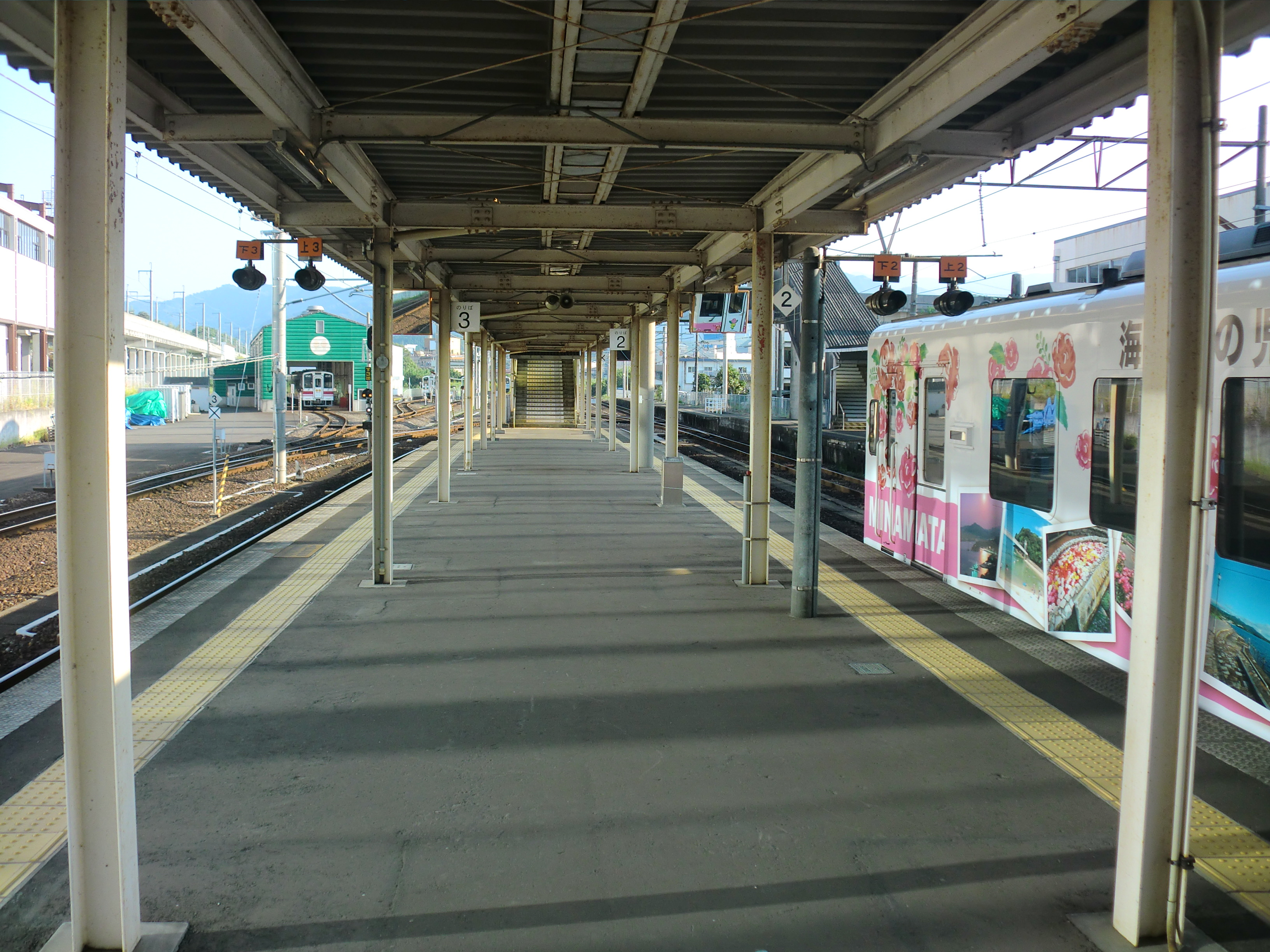
Hisatsu Orange platforms

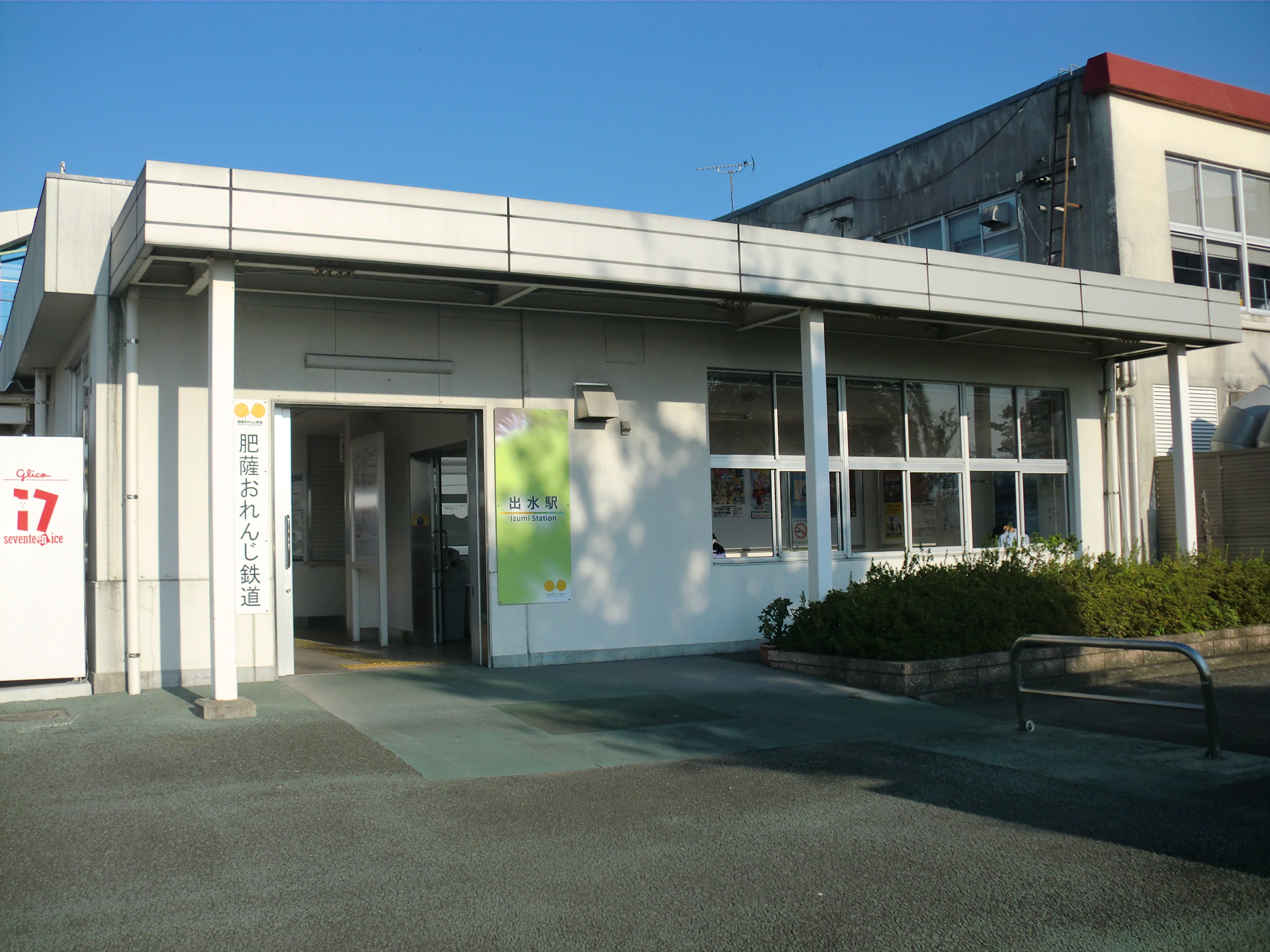
Hisatsu Orange station building

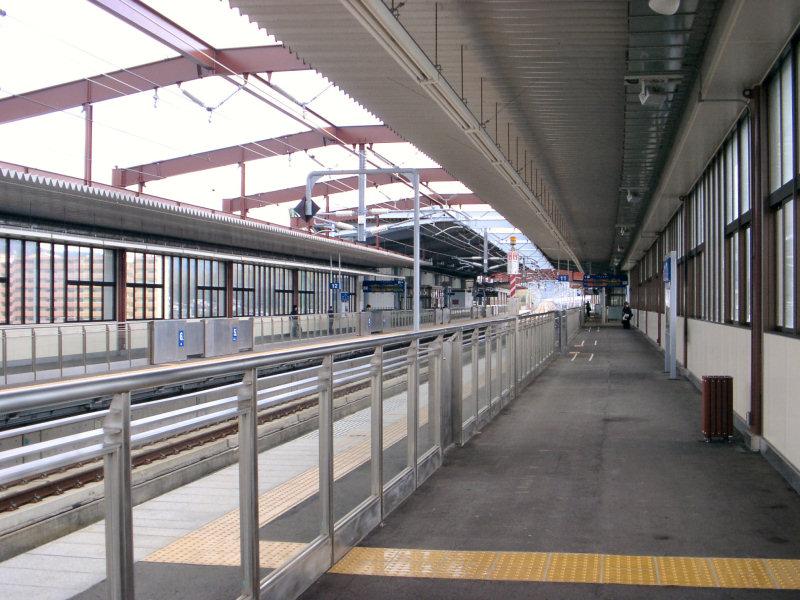
JR Kyyushu station

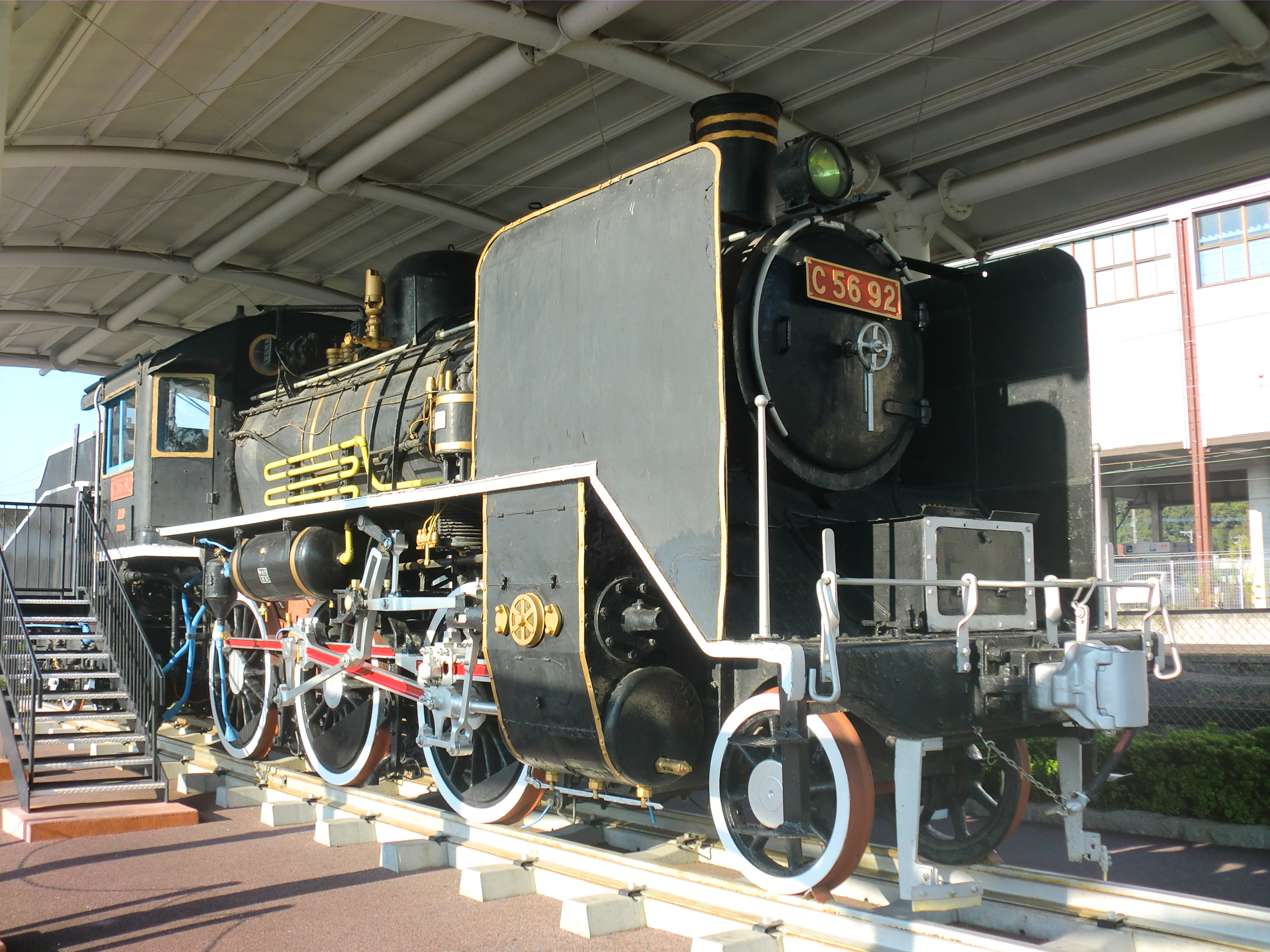
JNR Class C56

== Adjacent stations ==
←	Service	→
Hisatsu Orange Railway Line
Komenotsu	-	Nishi-Izumi

== History ==
Izumi Station was opened on 15 October 1923 as a station on the Japanese Government Railways Sendai Line, which was incorporated into the Kagoshima Main Line on 17 October 1927. With the privatization of the Japan National Railways on 1 April 1987, the station was transferred to JR Kyushu. On 13 March 2004, with the opening of the Kyushu Shinkansen, the station was transferred to the Hisatsu Orange Railway.

== Passenger statistics ==
The average daily passenger traffic in fiscal 2019 was 1125 passengers for the JR portion and 158 people for the Hisatsu portion of the station.

== Surrounding area ==
- Izumi City Hall

== See also ==
- List of railway stations in Japan
