= SL Hitoyoshi =

Japanese excursion train service

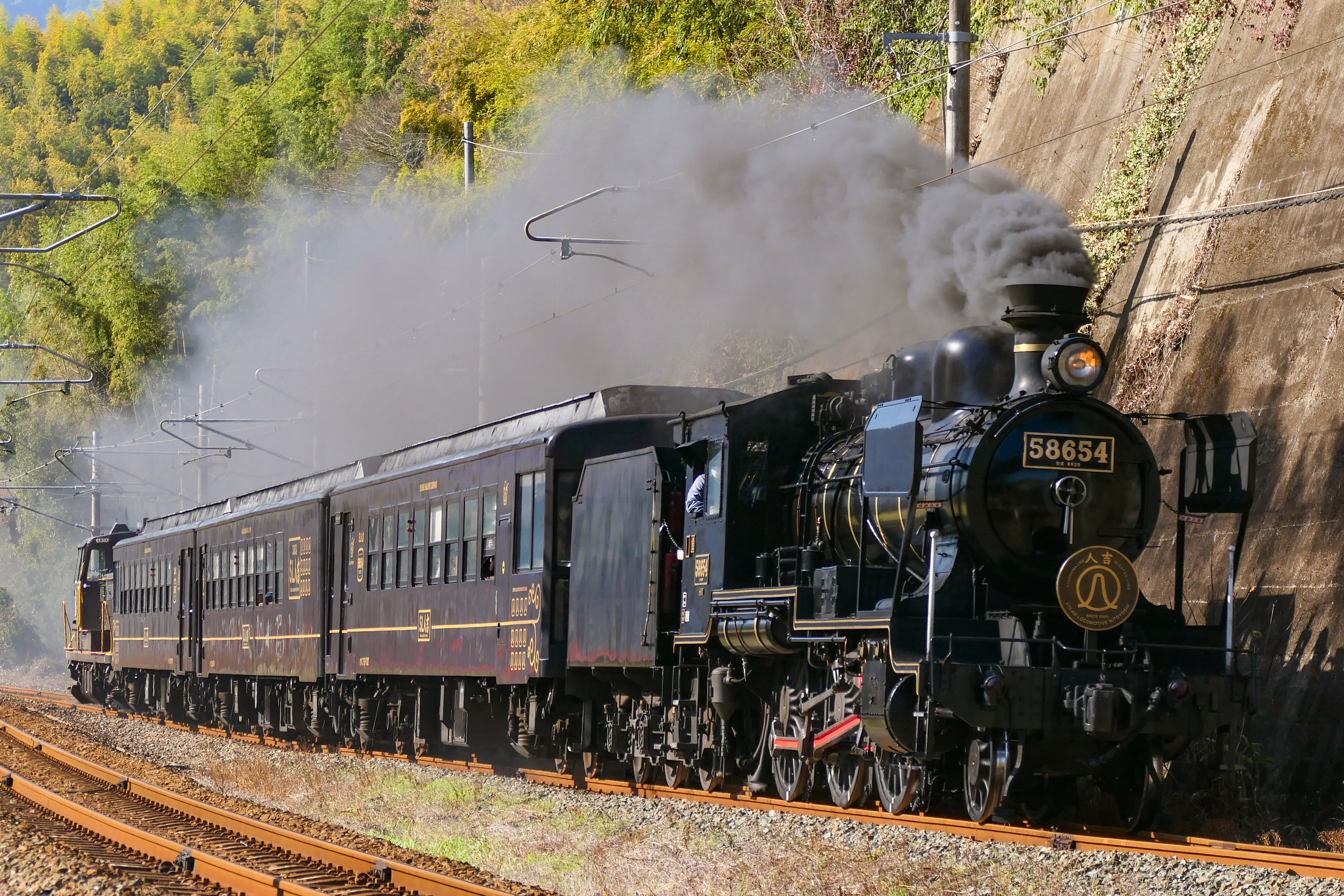
- 58654 on an SL Hitoyoshi service

Overview
- Service type: Joyful Train
- Status: Abolished
- Locale: Kyushu, Japan
- First service: 25 April 2009
- Last service: 23 March 2024
- Former operator: JR Kyushu

Route
- Termini: Kumamoto; Hitoyoshi
- Distance travelled: 84 km
- Average journey time: 2 hrs 50 min
- Service frequency: 1 return trip daily

On-board services
- Class: Standard
- Seating arrangements: 2+2 (standard)
- Catering facilities: Car 2
- Observation facilities: Cars 1 and 3

Technical
- Rolling stock: 50 series coaches
- Track gauge: 1,067 mm (3 ft 6 in)

The SL Hitoyoshi (SL 人吉) was a named steam hauled excursion train operated by the Kyushu Railway Company (JR Kyushu) on the Kagoshima Main Line and the Hisatsu Line between April 2009 and March 2024.

== Overview ==
The SL Hitoyoshi ran a return journey between Kumamoto and Hitoyoshi once a day on weekends and national holidays from March to November. The train was inaugurated to celebrate the 100th anniversary of the completion of the Hisatsu Line. A reserved seat must have been made prior to boarding. The train stopped at Shin-Yatsushiro, Yatsushiro, Sakamoto, Shiroishi, Isshōchi, and Watari.

Since the damage of the 2020 Kyushu floods to the Hisatsu Line, the SL Hitoyoshi temporarily ran between Kumamoto and Tosu Station.

== Rolling stock ==
The SL Hitoyoshi consists of an 8620 (8620形) Class steam locomotive and three specially modified OHa 50 series (オハ50系) carriages. The interior design of the carriages was done by industrial designer Eiji Mitooka. On occasion the train was assisted or hauled by a Class DE10 (DE10形) diesel locomotive.

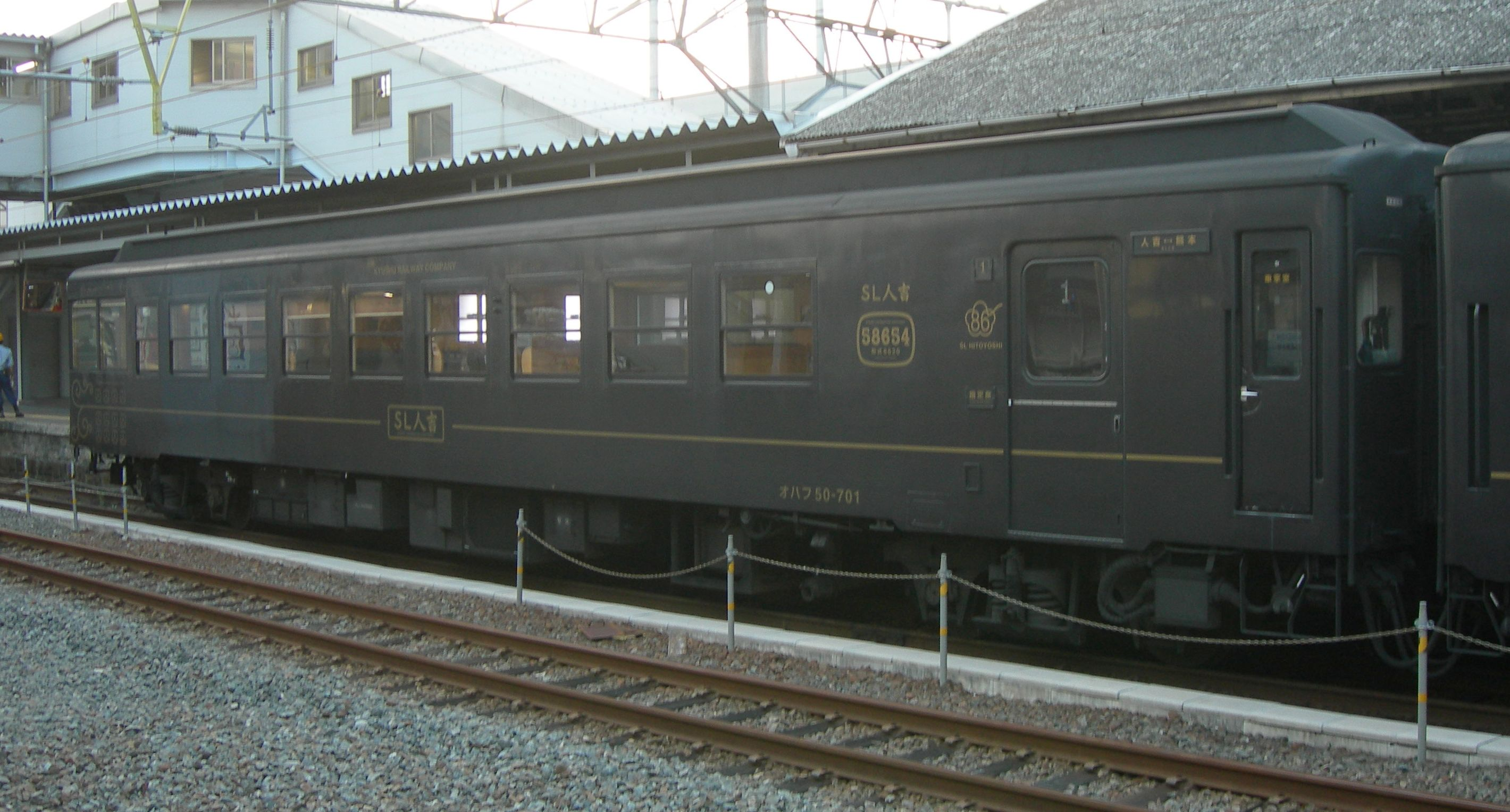

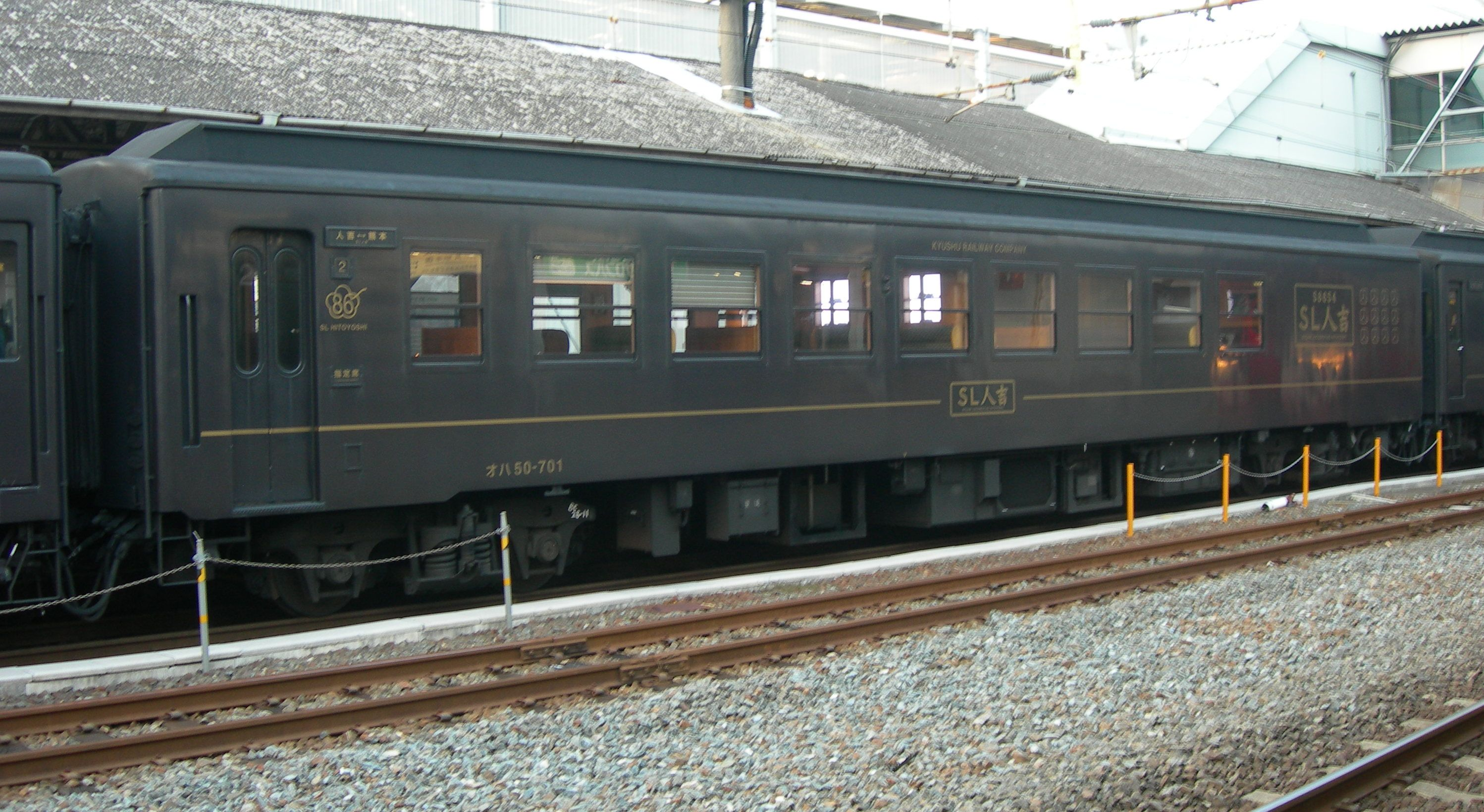

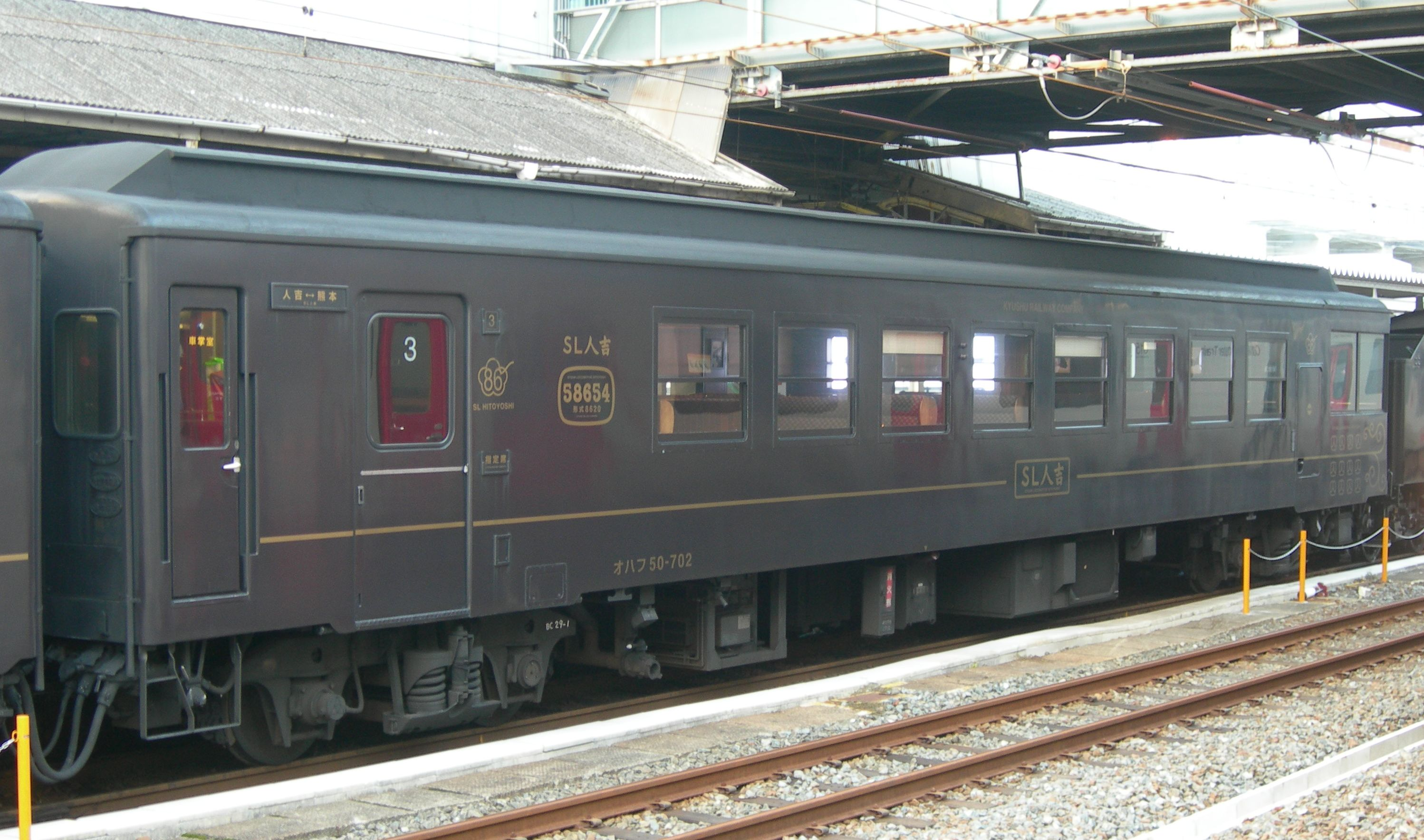

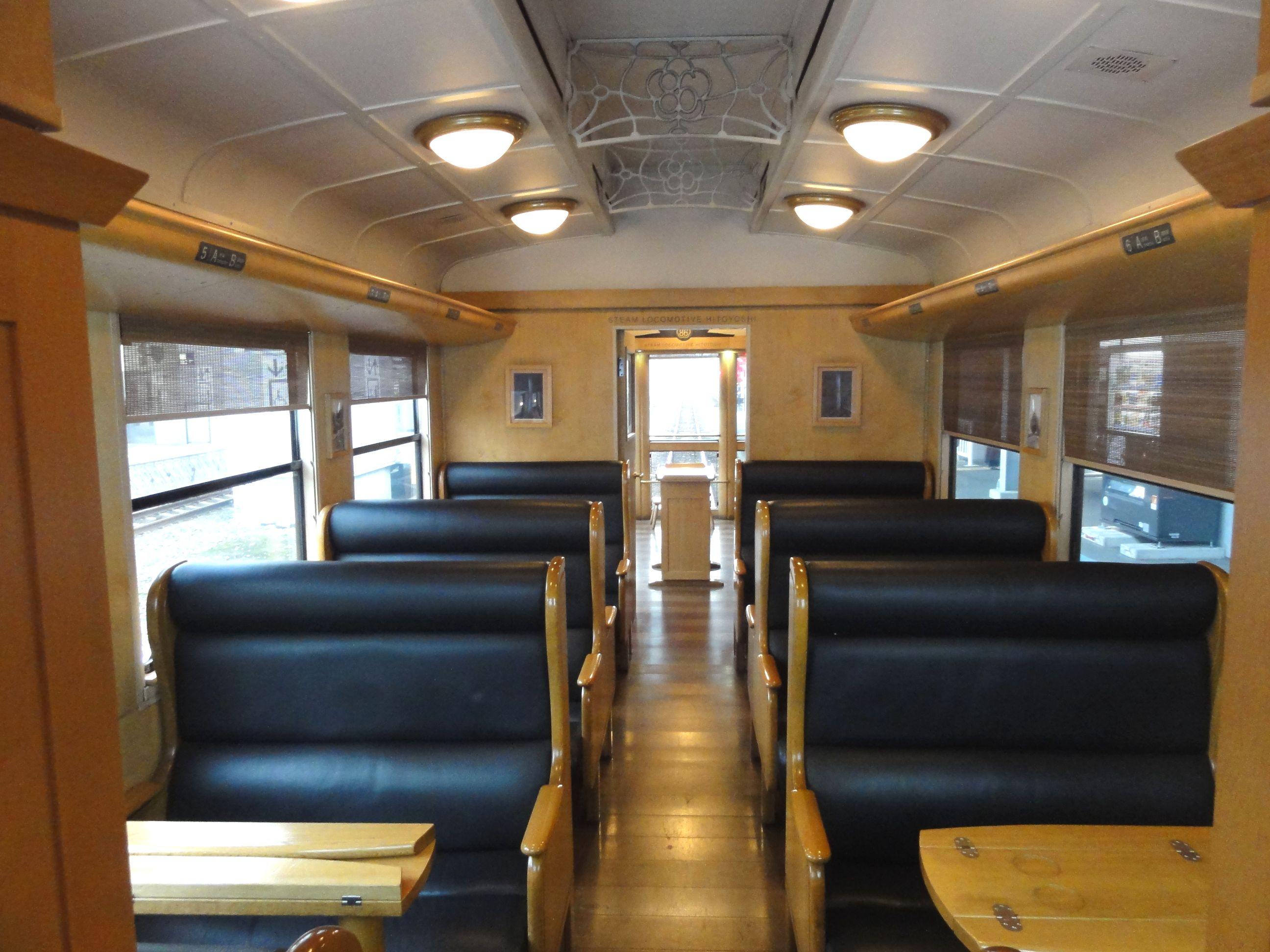
JR Kyushu Ohafu50-701 inside

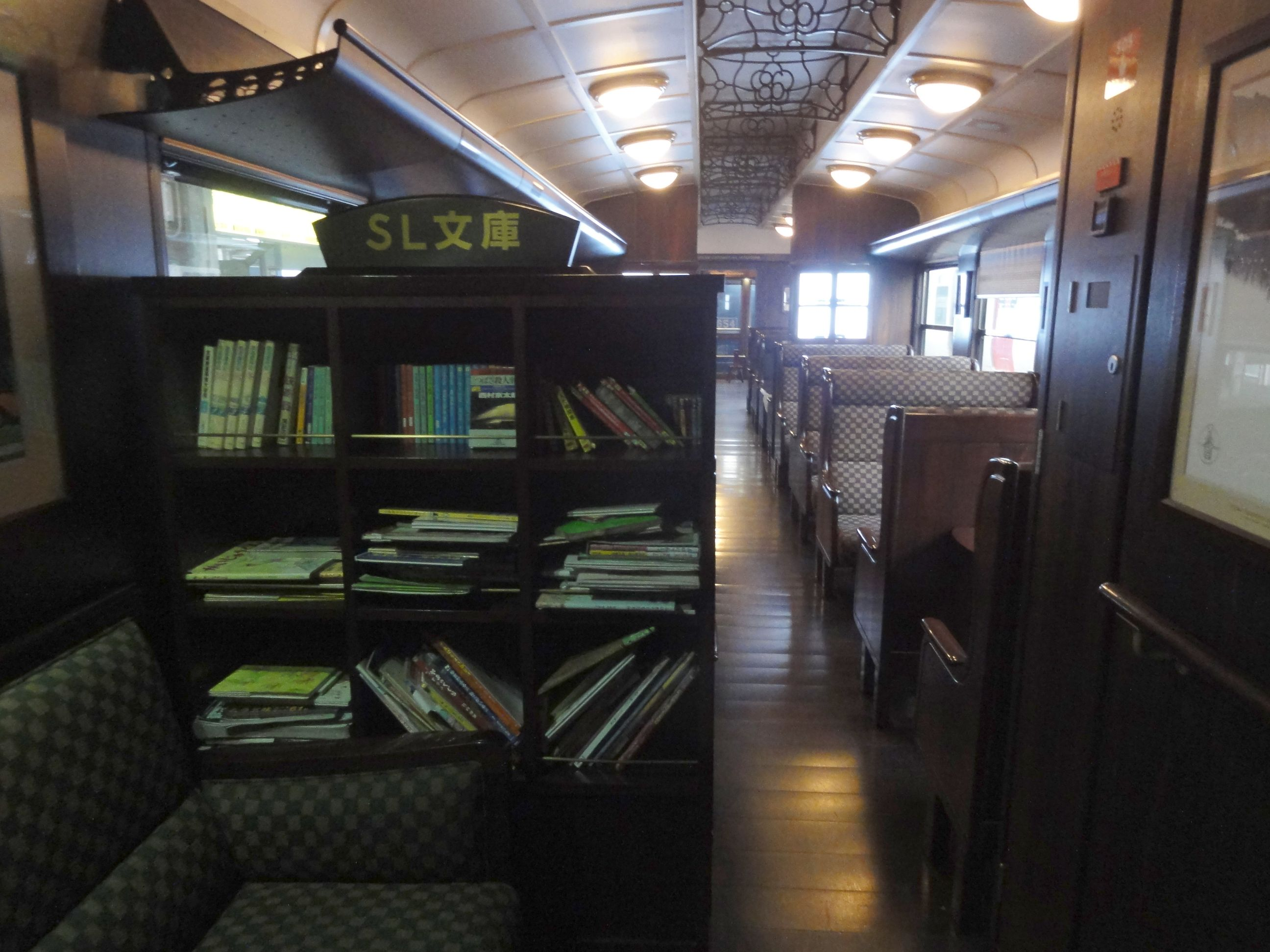
JR Kyushu Ohafu50-702 inside showing children's library

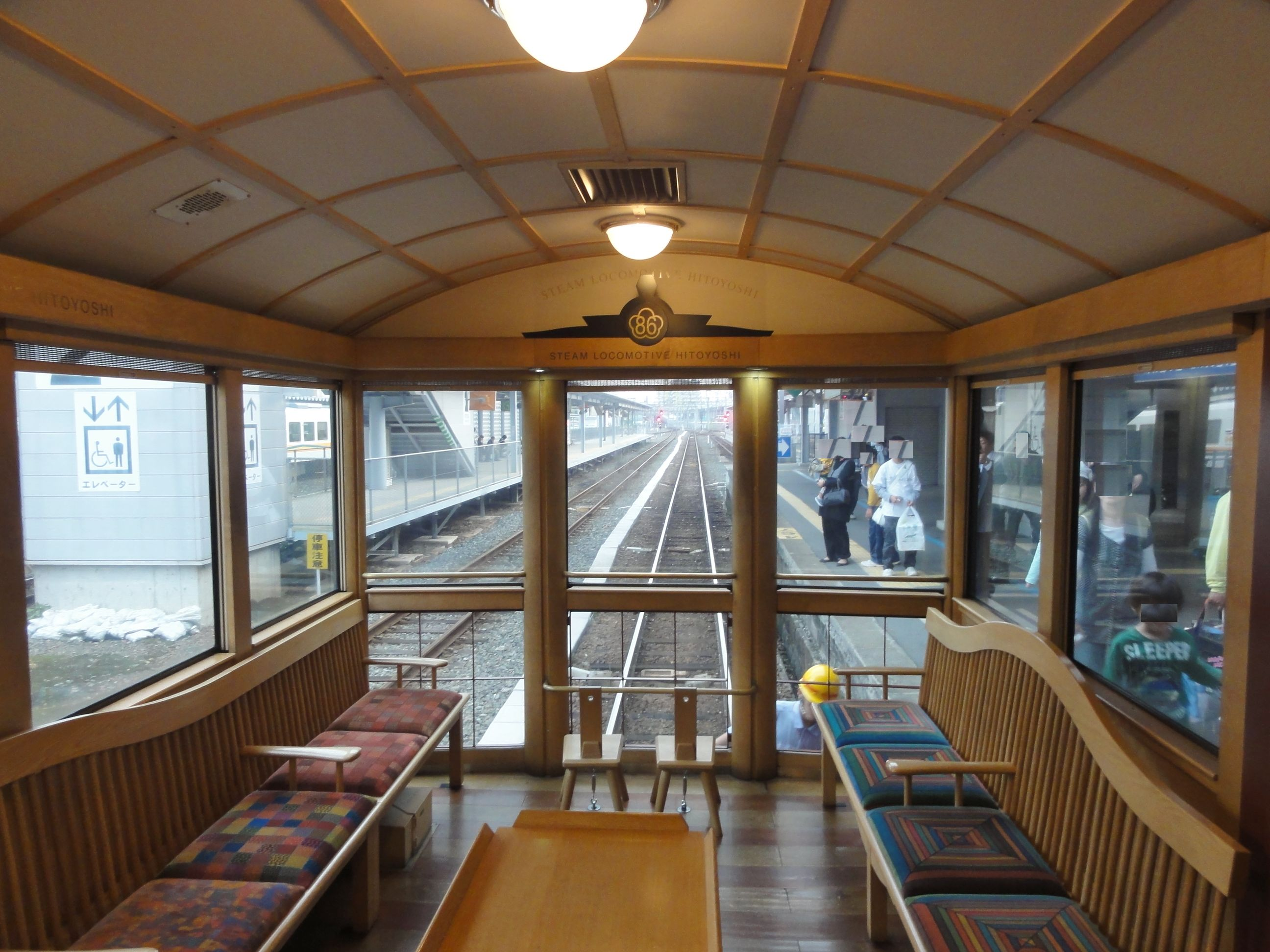
Ohafu50-701 Prospects Lounge

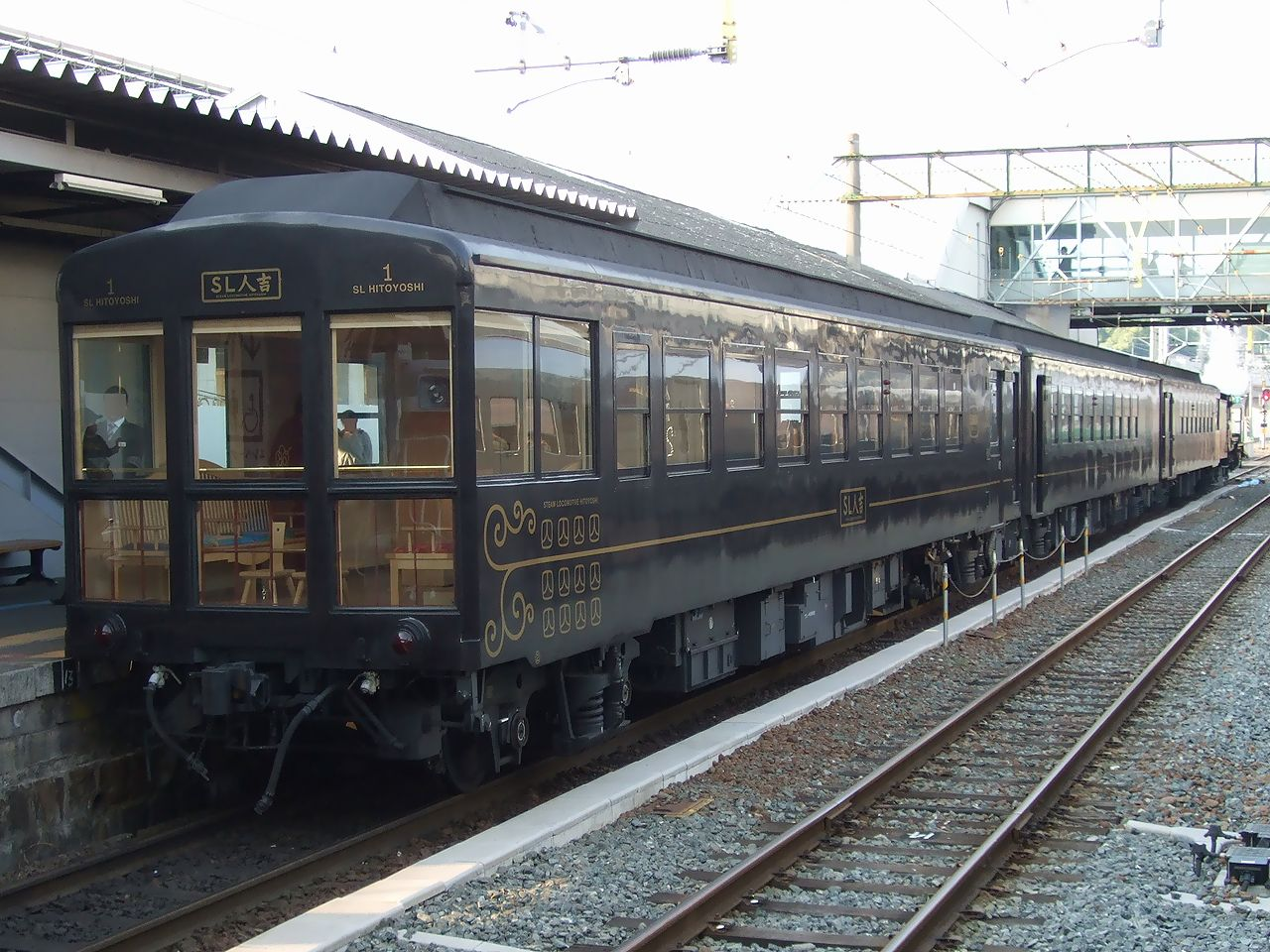
JR Kyushu PC SL Hitoyoshi

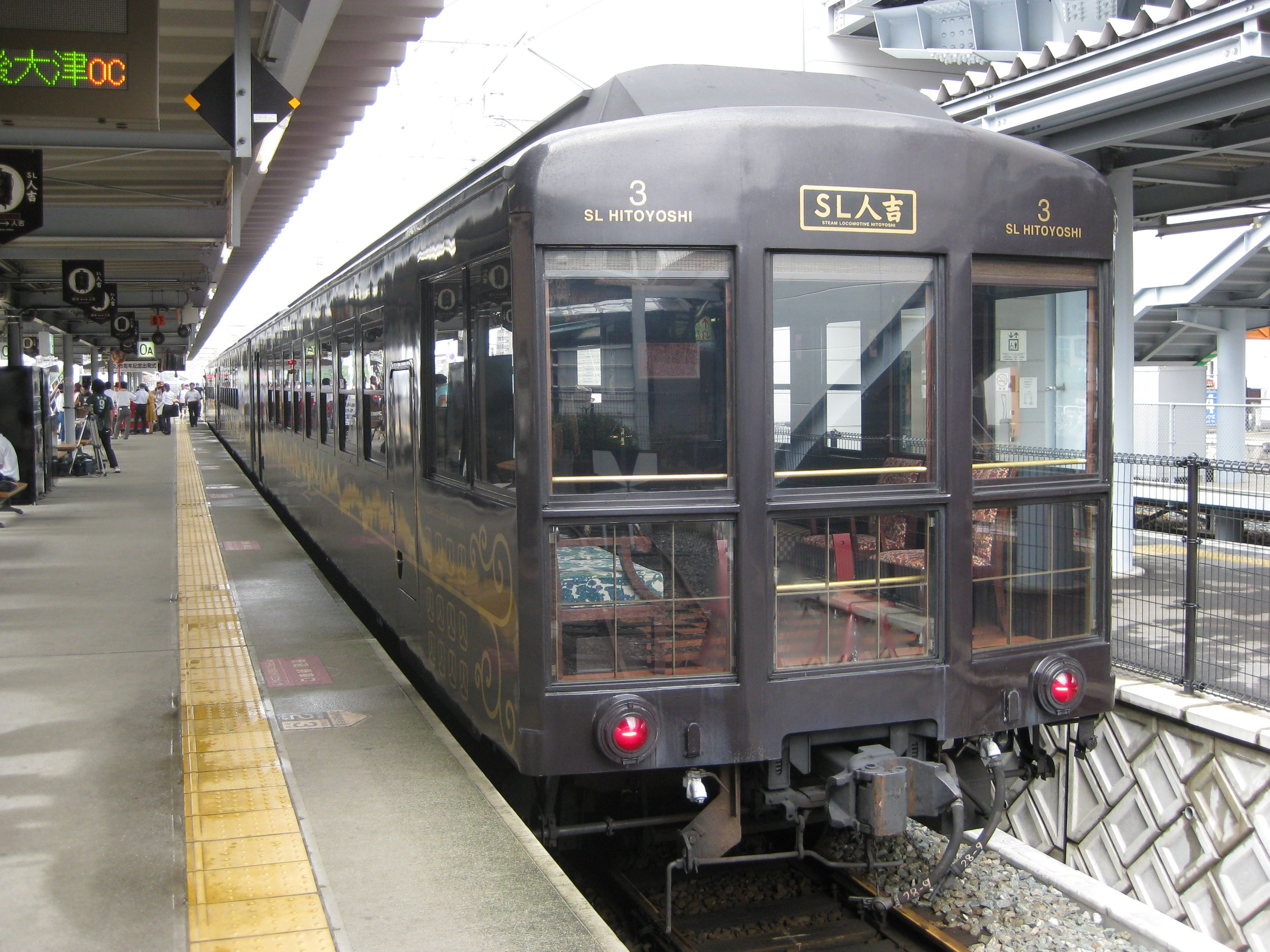

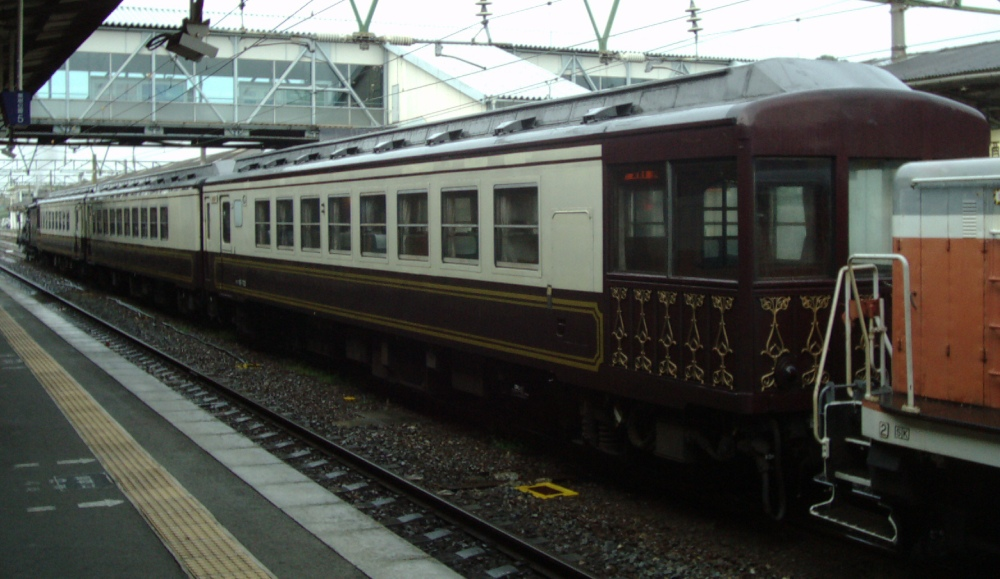
The carriages in their original SL Aso Boy livery.

=== Exterior ===
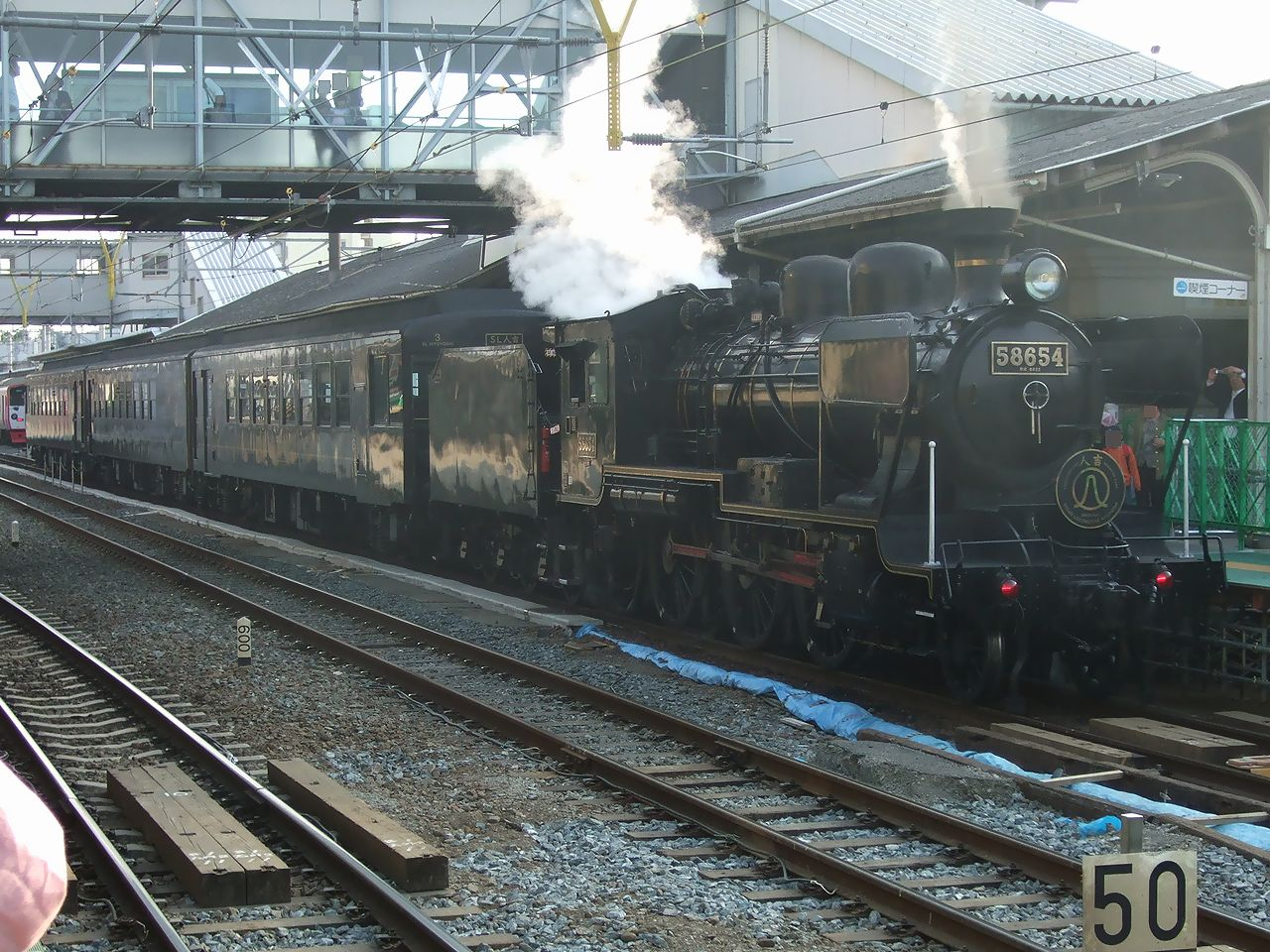
JR Kyushu train SL Hitoyoshi

The train livery is painted chocolate with grey roofs and SL Hitoyoshi motifs and lettering in gold.

In 2020, JR Kyushu repainted the SL Hitoyoshi black to replicate the Mugen Train from the anime film Demon Slayer: Kimetsu no Yaiba the Movie: Mugen Train for a limited run from Kumamoto Station to Hakata Station from 1 to 26 November.

== See also ==
- List of named passenger trains of Japan
- Joyful Train, the generic name for excursion and charter trains in Japan.
- History of rail transport in Japan
- List of operational steam locomotives in Japan
- Japan Railways locomotive numbering and classification
