= Watari Station =

Watari Station is the name of multiple train stations in Japan:

- Watari Station (Kumamoto) - (渡駅) in Kumamoto Prefecture
- Watari Station (Miyagi) - (亘理駅) in Miyagi Prefecture
