= Kyūsendō Station =

Railway station in Kuma, Kumamoto Prefecture, Japan

Kyūsendō Station 球泉洞駅
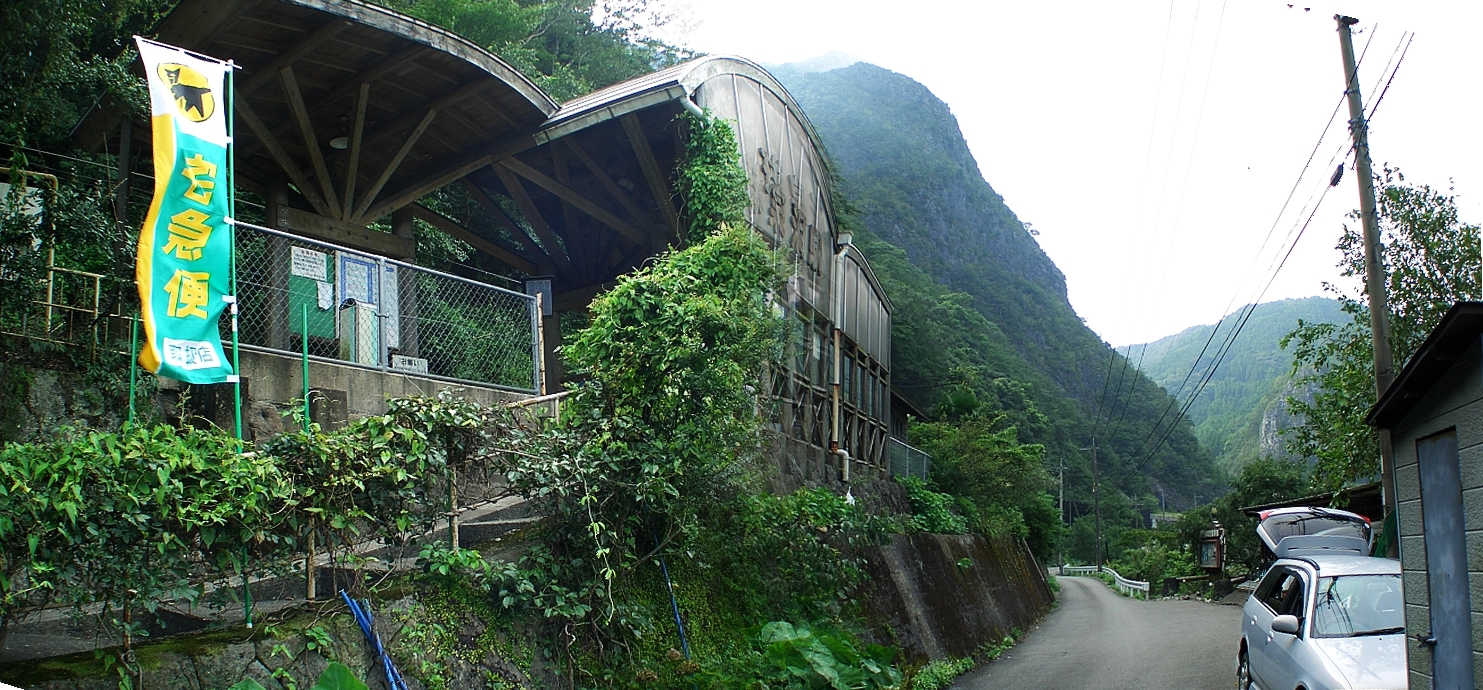
- Kyūsendō Station building

General information
- Location: Japan
- Coordinates: 32°16′05″N 130°36′29″E
- Operator: JR Kyushu
- Line: ■ Hisatsu Line

Other information
- Website: Official website
Location
- Location within Japan

Kyūsendō Station (球泉洞駅, Kyūsendō-eki) is a railway station on the Hisatsu Line in Kuma, Kumamoto, Japan, operated by Kyushu Railway Company (JR Kyushu).

== Lines ==
Kyūsendō Station is served by the Hisatsu Line.

== Adjacent stations ==
←	Service	→
Hisatsu Line
Shiroishi	Local	Isshōchi

== See also ==
- List of railway stations in Japan
