= JGR Class 8620 =

Class of Japanese 2-6-0 steam locomotives

JGR Class 8620 Taiwan Railways Class CT150
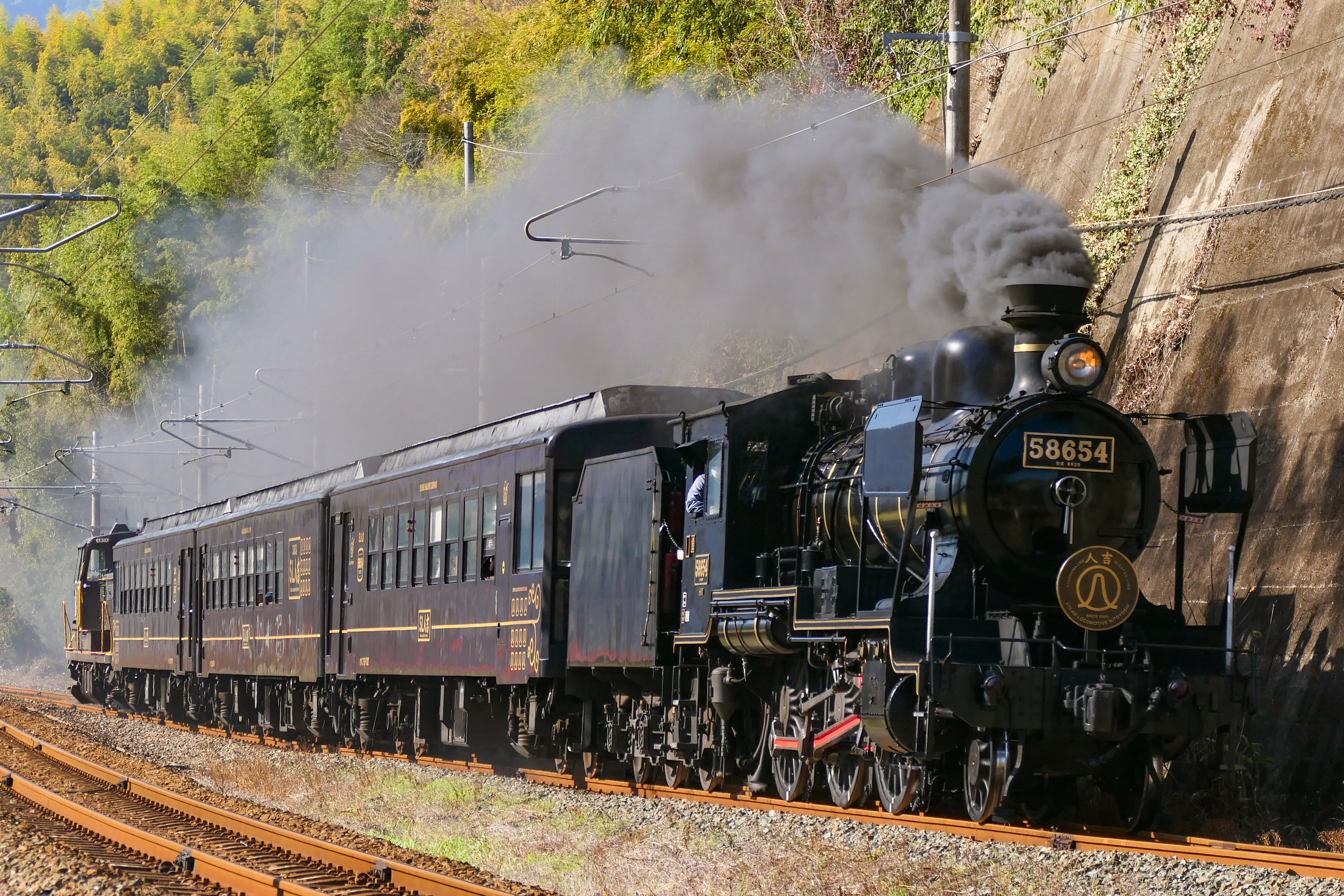
- 58654 in January 2024
Type and origin
- Power type: Steam
- Builder: Mitsubishi Heavy Industries, Hitachi, Nippon Sharyo, Kawasaki Heavy Industries Rolling Stock Company, Kisha Seizo
- Build date: 1914-1929
- Total produced: 672
Specifications
- Configuration
  - Whyte: 2-6-0
- Gauge: 1,067 mm (3 ft 6 in)
- Leading dia.: 940 mm (3 ft 1 in)
- Driver dia.: 1,600 mm (5 ft 3 in)
- Length
  - Over couplers: 16,765 mm (55 ft 0 in)
- Width: 2,581 mm (8 ft 5.6 in)
- Height: 3,785 mm (12 ft 5.0 in)
- Frame type: Plate
- Loco weight: 48.83 t (48.06 long tons; 53.83 short tons)
- Tender weight: 34.50 t (33.96 long tons; 38.03 short tons)
- Cylinder size: 470 mm × 610 mm (19 in × 24 in)
- Valve gear: Walschaerts
Performance figures
- Maximum speed: 90 km/h (56 mph) (?)
- Power output: 558 kW (748 hp) (?)
- Tractive effort: 89.2 kN (20,100 lbf)
Career
- Operators: JNR; JR Kyushu; Taiwan Railways
- Number in class: 672
- Numbers: 8620 - 88651, CT151 - CT192
- Nicknames: Hachiroku, Mugen Train
- Retired: 1975
- Preserved: 21

The Class 8620 (8620形) is a type of 2-6-0 steam locomotive built in Japan from 1914 to 1929. It was Japan's first mass-produced passenger locomotive. A total of 672 Class 8620 locomotives were built. Originally they had a symmetry of line with shapely cast iron chimneys which gave way to plainer chimneys and smoke deflectors were added in later years.

A total of 42 Class 8620 locomotives were built for Imperial Taiwan Railway from 1919 to 1928. After World War II, they were taken over by Taiwan Government Railways, and were classified CT150.

== Preserved examples ==
As of 2014, 20 Class 8620 locomotives have been preserved in Japan and one in Taiwan, as follows.

=== Japan ===
- 8620: Preserved at the Ome Railway Park in Ome, Tokyo
- 8630: Preserved in working order at the Kyoto Railway Museum in Kyoto
- 28651: Preserved in Ono, Fukui
- 48624: Preserved in a park in Otofuke, Hokkaido
- 48640: Preserved in Hirosaki, Aomori
- 48647: Preserved in Takachiho, Miyazaki
- 48650: Preserved in Miyoshi, Hiroshima
- 48696: Preserved at the municipal zoo in Omuta, Fukuoka
- 58623: Preserved in Toyokawa, Aichi
- 58654: Preserved on display at Hitoyoshi Station. From 2009 to 2024, it was in working order as the SL Hitoyoshi at Kumamoto Depot in Kumamoto.
- 58680: Preserved in a park in Mobara, Chiba
- 58683: Preserved in a park in Sakura, Chiba
- 58685: Preserved in front of Tadotsu Station in Tadotsu, Kagawa
- 68691: Preserved in a park in Yamagata, Yamagata
- 68692: Preserved in a park in Tokushima, Tokushima
- 78626: Preserved in a park in Onga, Fukuoka
- 78653: Preserved at Wespa Tsubakiyama in Fukaura, Aomori
- 78675: Preserved in a park in Gojo, Nara
- 78693: Preserved at Koriyama Depot in Koriyama, Fukushima
- 88622: Preserved in Iki, Nagasaki

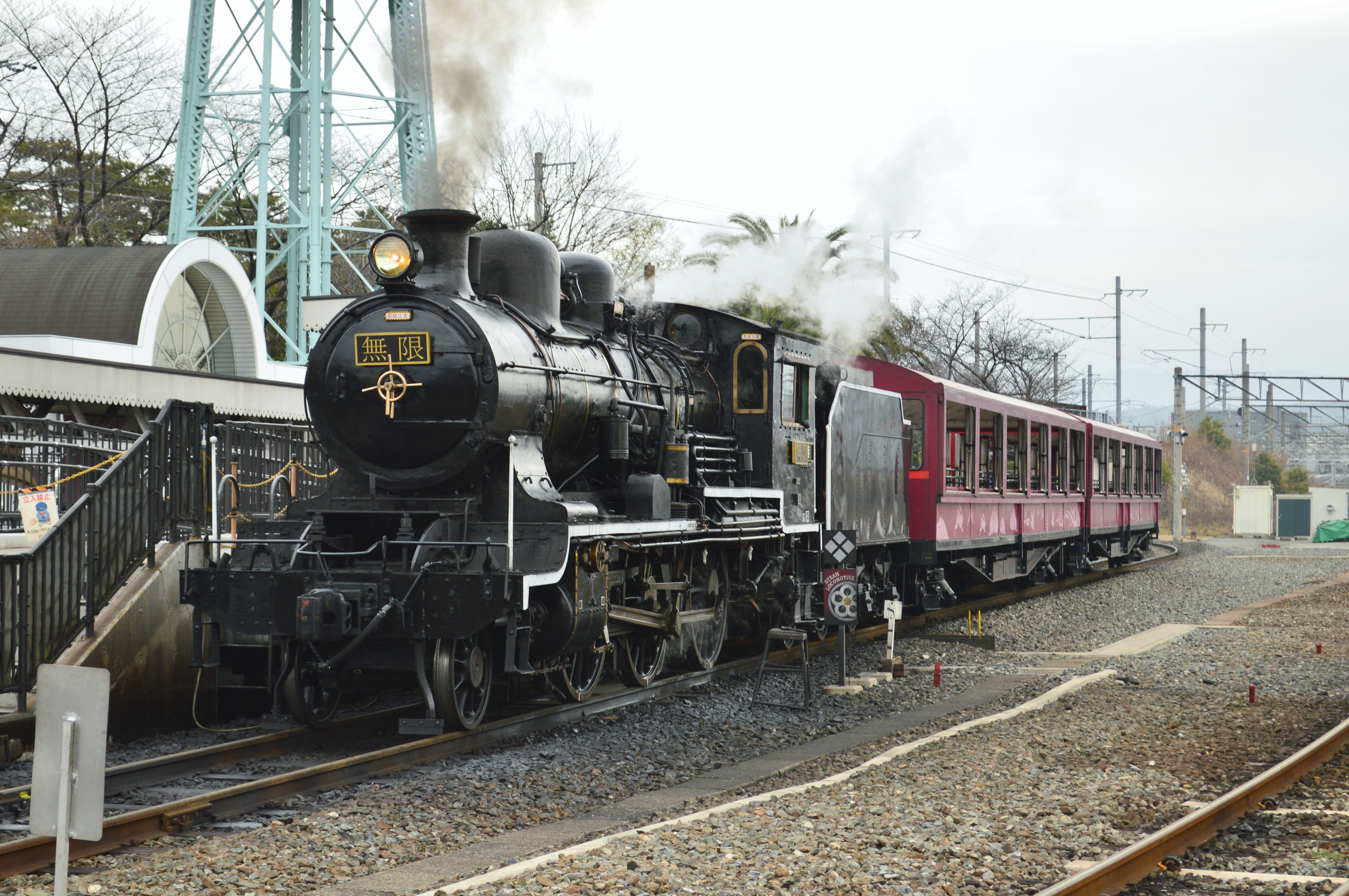
8620 No. 8630 dressed as Mugen Train in the Kyoto Railway Museum

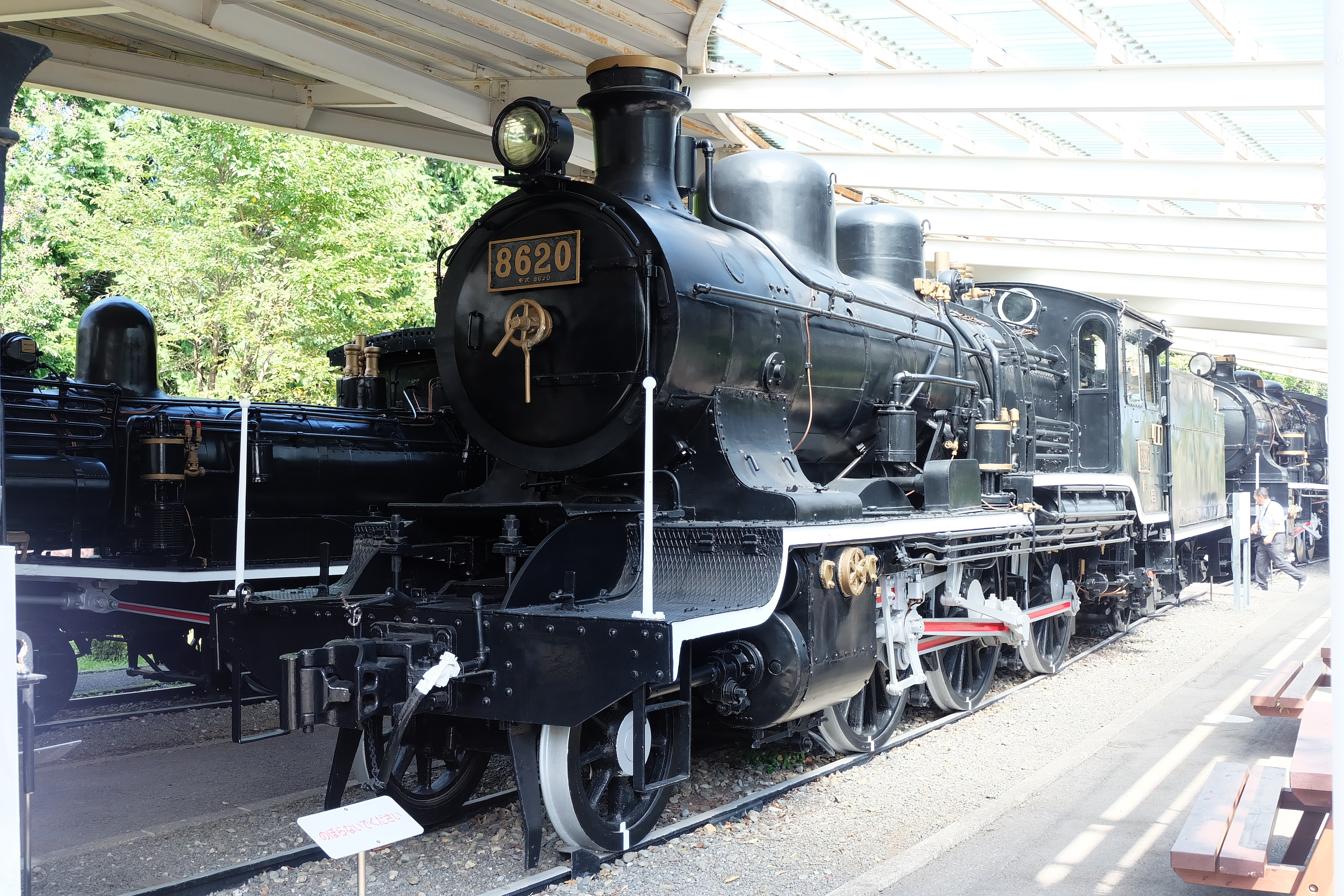
8620 at the Ome Railway Park in September 2015

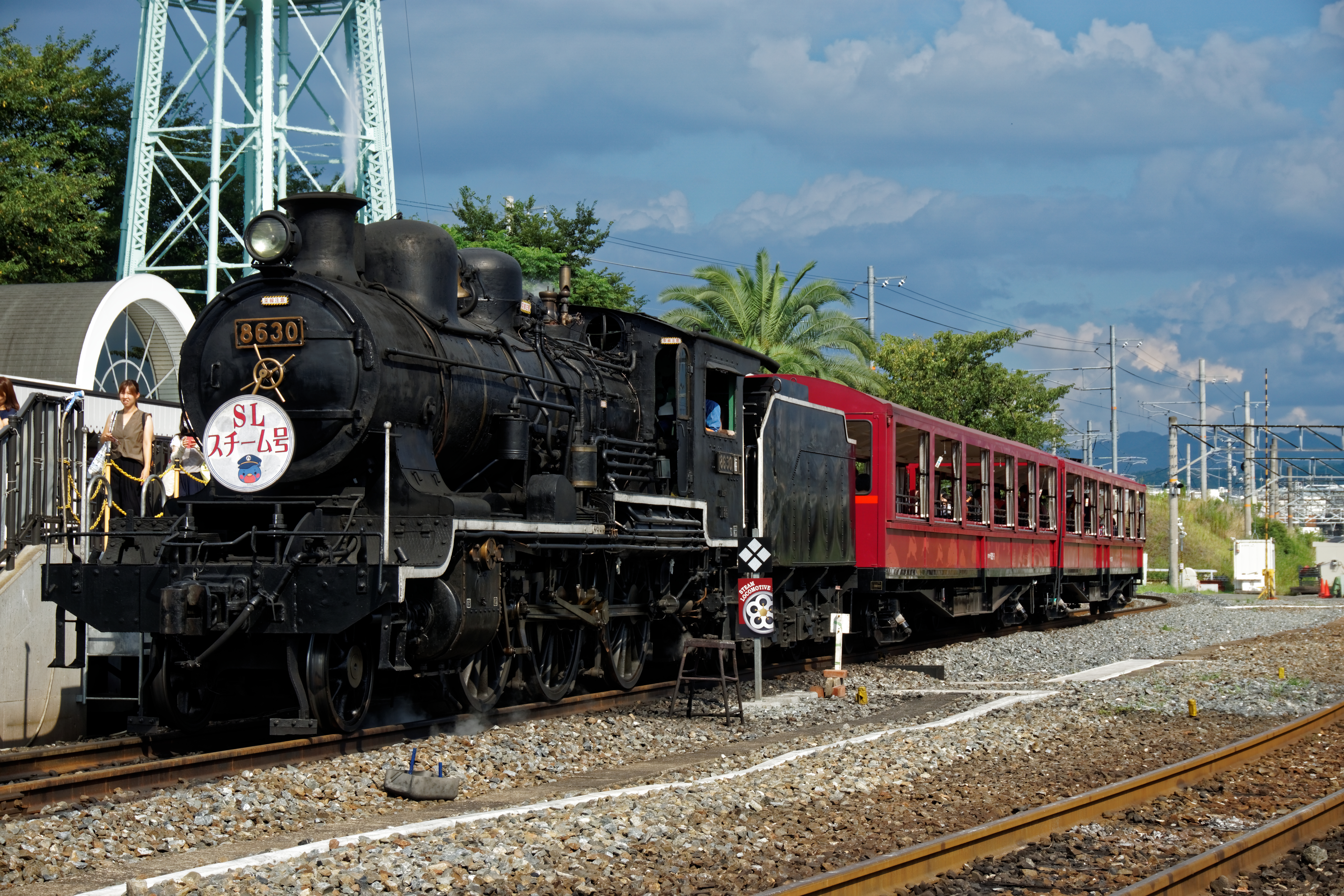
Preserved 8630 in operation at the Kyoto Railway Museum in August 2016

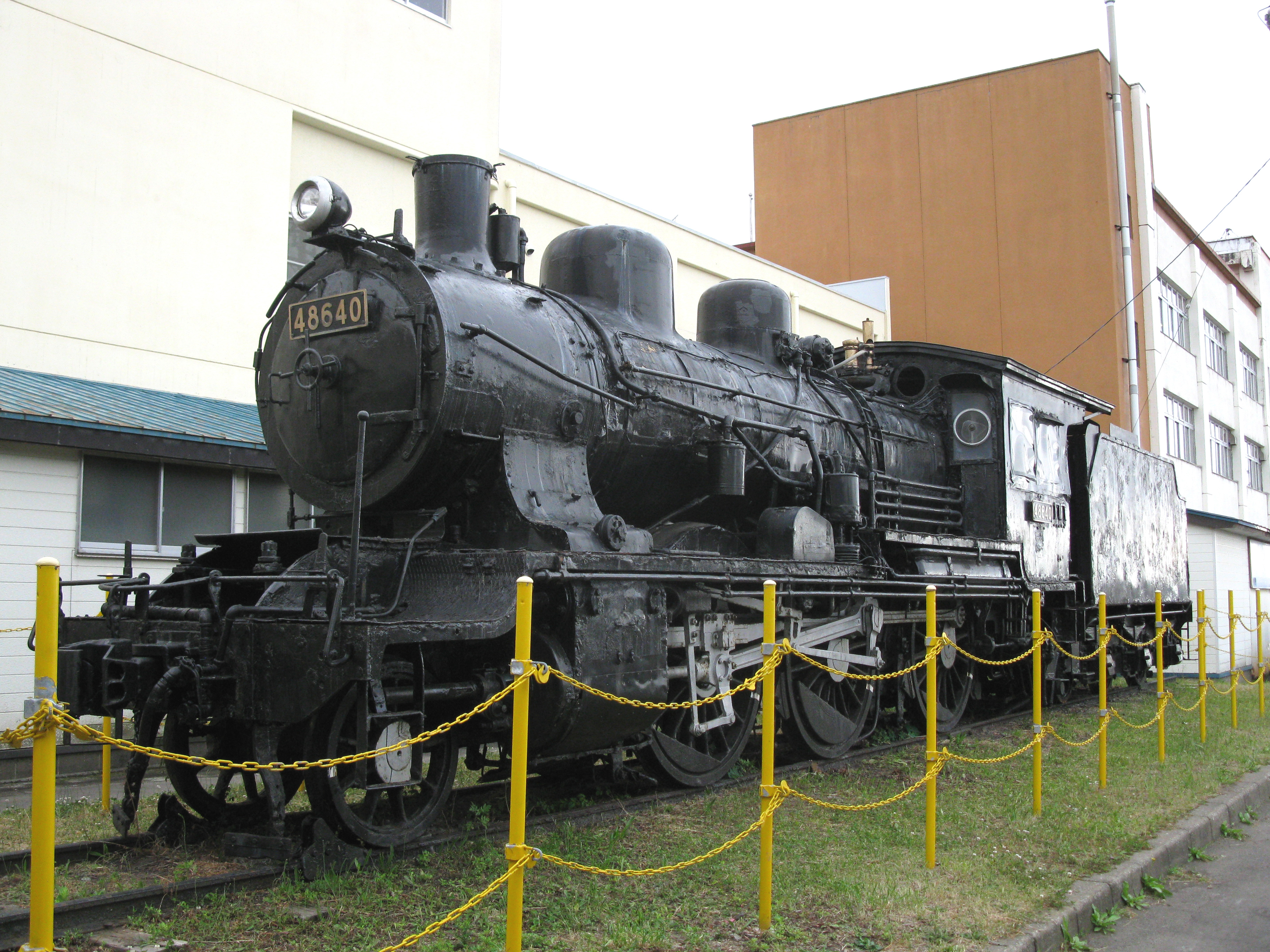
48640 in Aomori Prefecture in June 2011

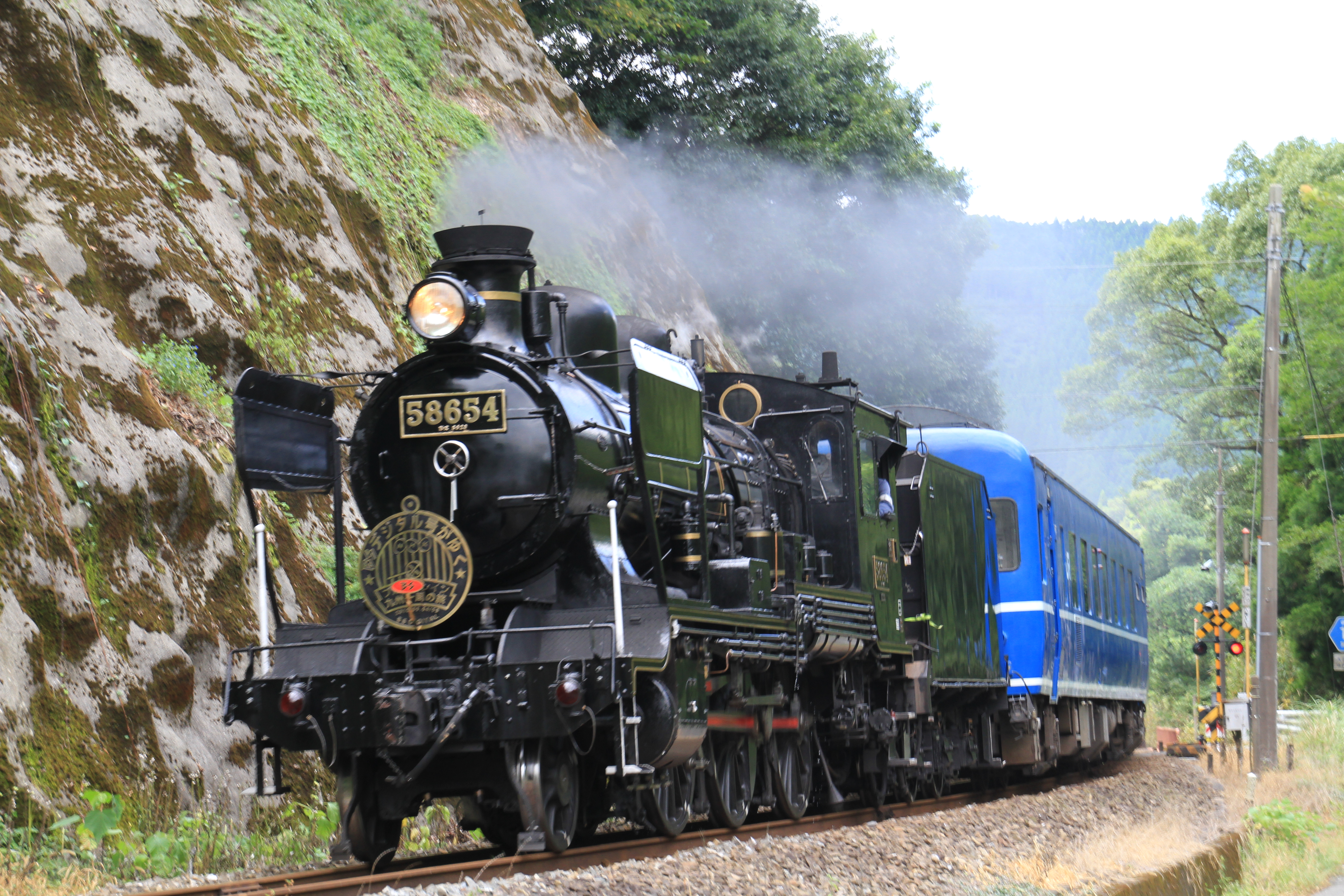
Preserved 58654 in operation in September 2010

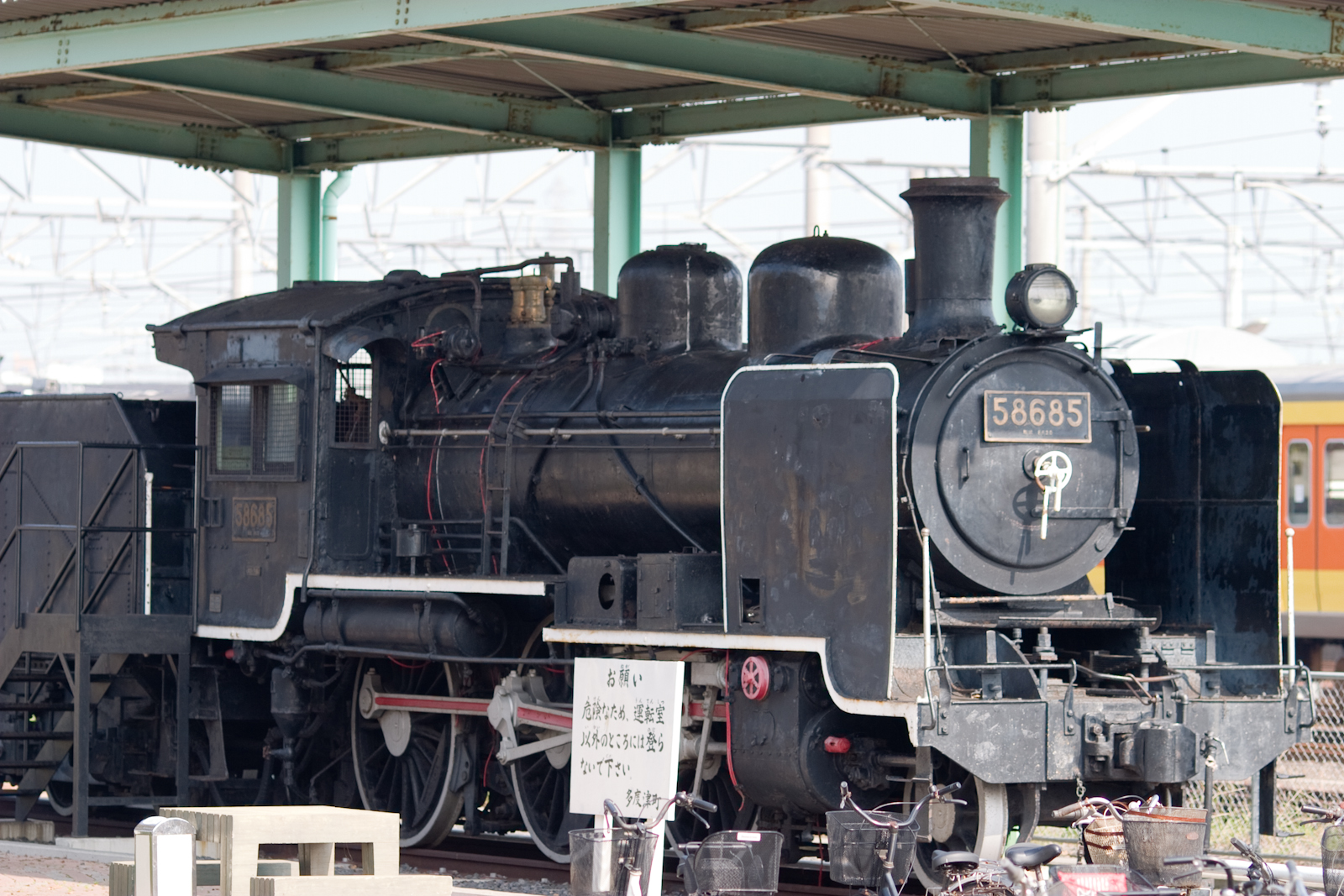
58685 in Tadotsu in October 2004

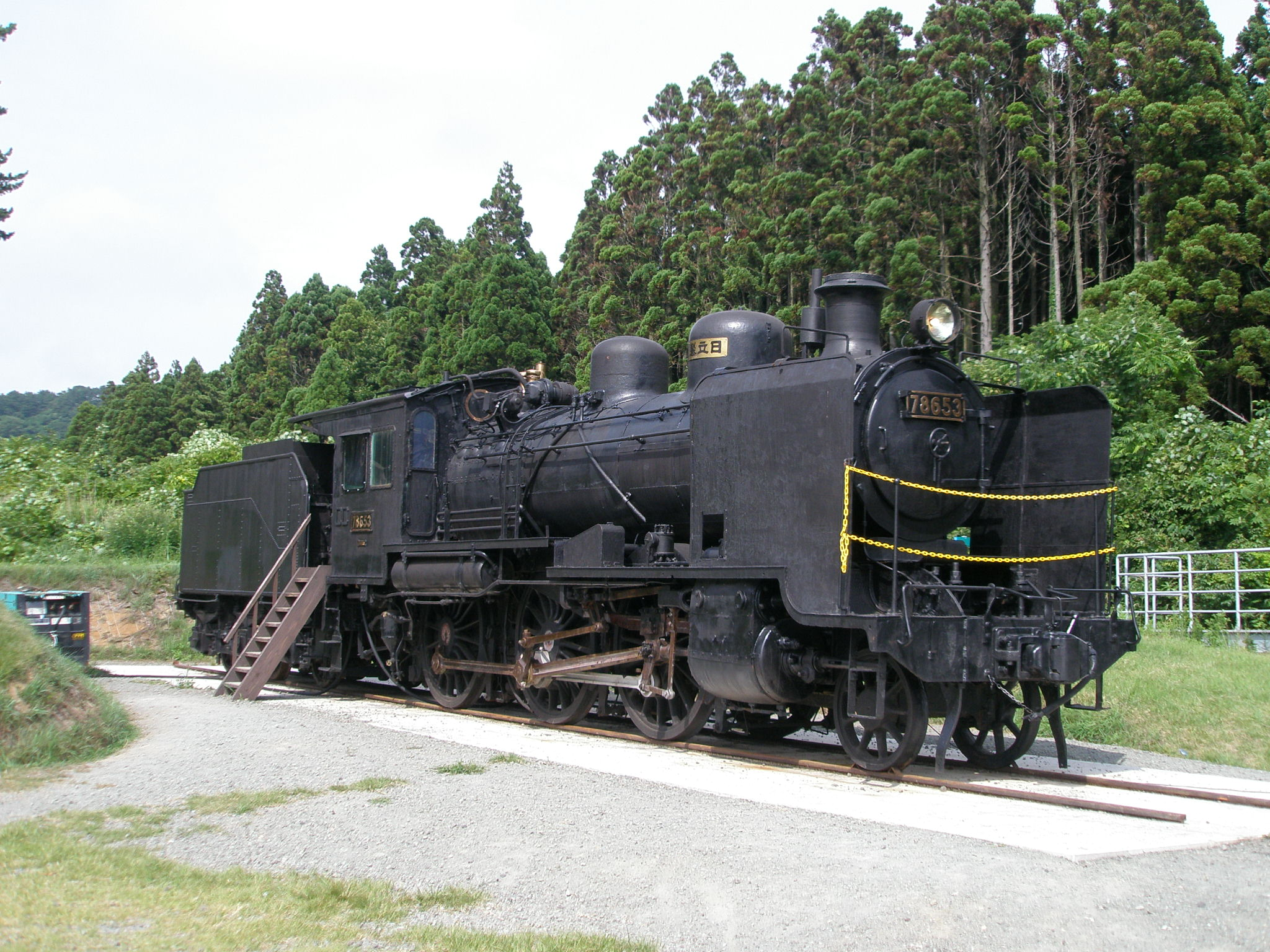
78653 in August 2007

=== Taiwan ===
- CT152: Preserved at Miaoli Railway Museum in Miaoli
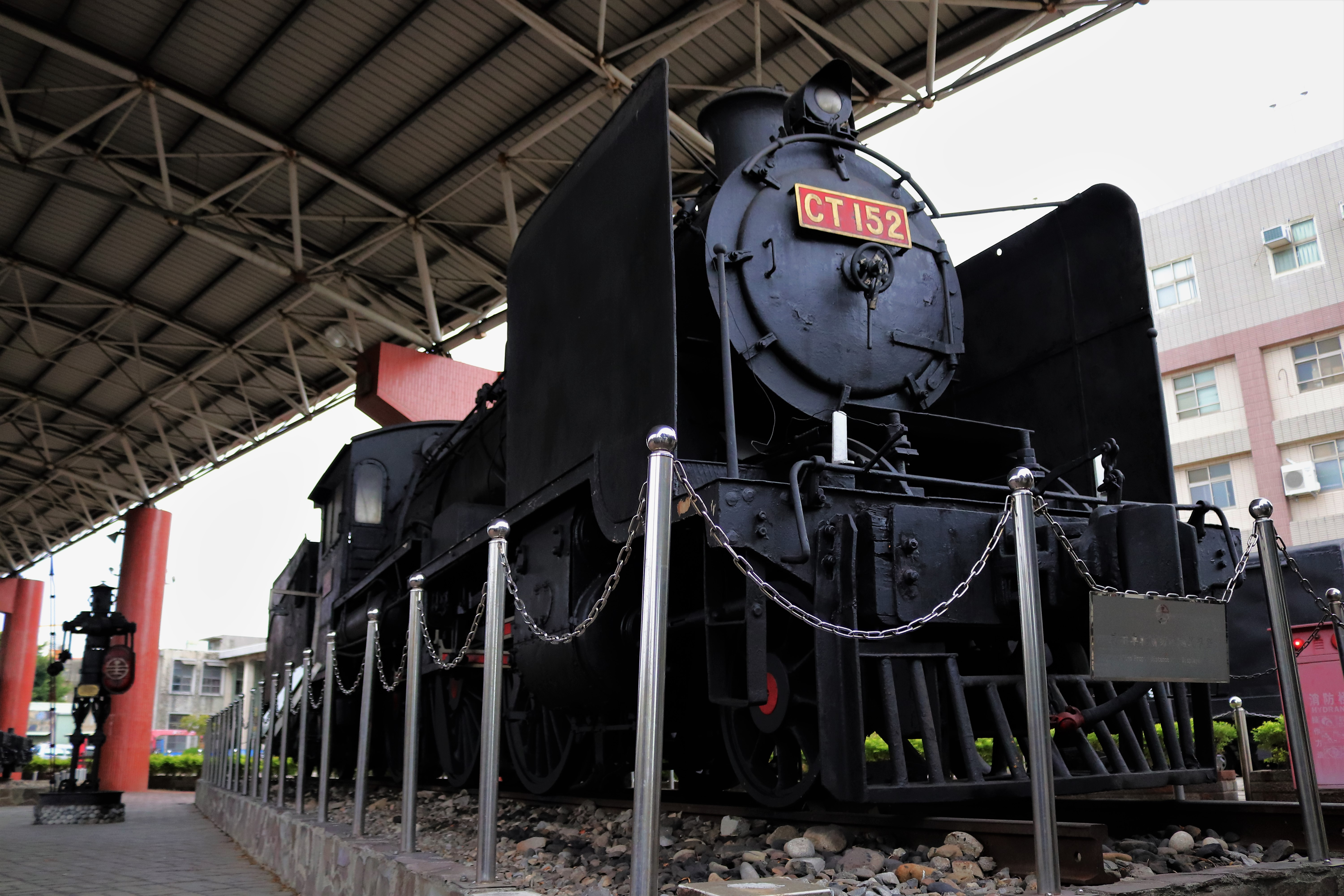
Taiwan Railway CT152 in October 2020

== In popular culture ==
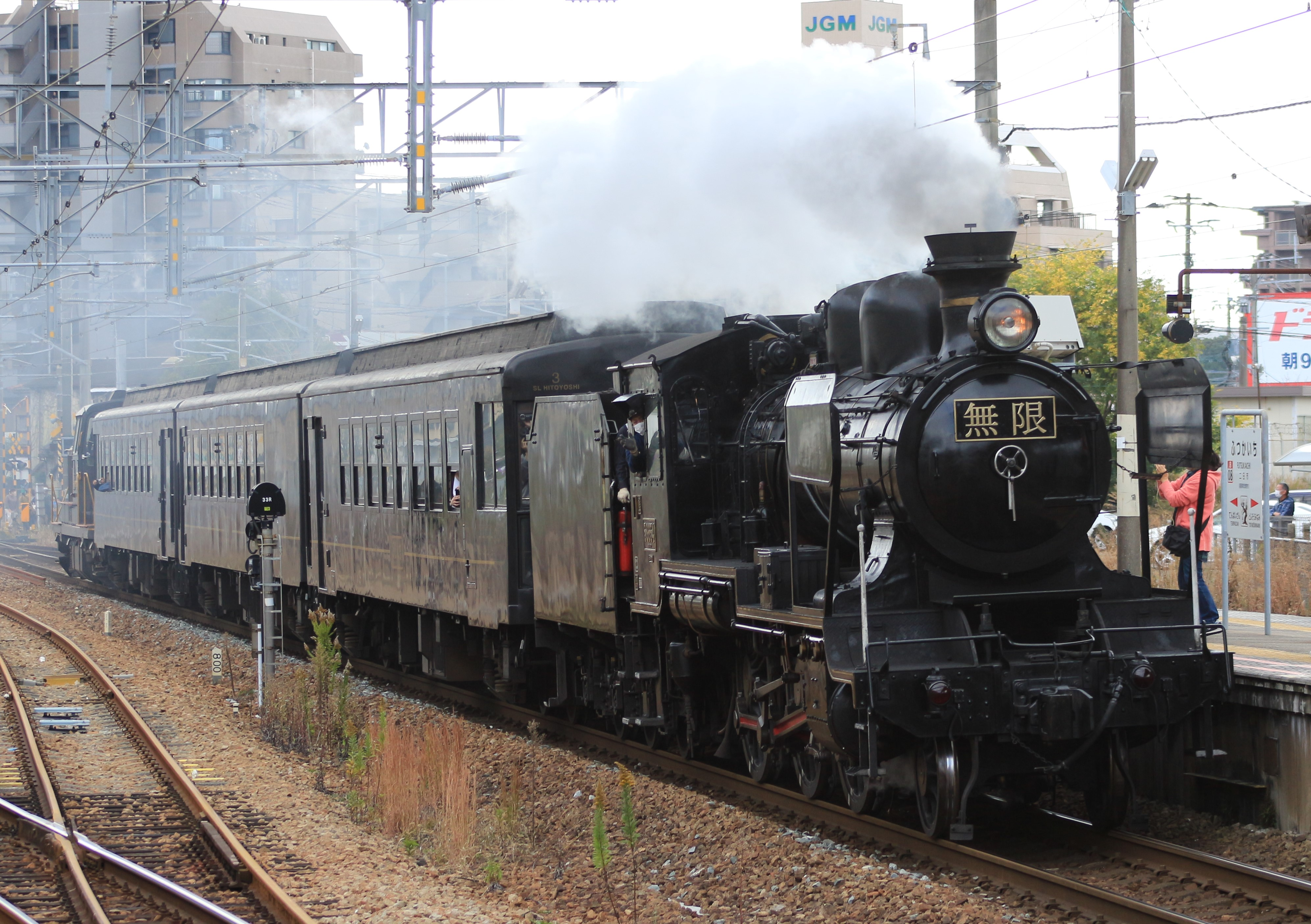
Steam locomotive 58654 operated by Kyushu Railway Co. during the film's release for publicity.

KATO have made models in N gauge of the 8620 in the Tohoku region as well as SL Hitoyoshi in a special 4-car limited edition boxed set. Plarail have also depicted the 8620 in the form of SL Hitoyoshi and SL Aso Boy.

The Class 8620 has made appearances in notable forms of Japanese media. Maitetsu, a visual novel developed by now-disbanded visual novel developer Lose, featuring anthropomorphic depictions of steam locomotives known as "Raillords". Hachiroku, a depiction of class leader No. 8620, is the main heroine of the novel.

The Class 8620's popularity would rise when the locomotive would be featured in the movie Demon Slayer: Kimetsu no Yaiba – The Movie: Mugen Train, taking place on a train pulled by the Mugen Train, modeled after the real No. 8620 on display at the Ome Railway Park. The two operational Class 8620s, 8630 and 58654, were cosmetically modified to match the train as seen in the movie and operated with these cosmetic modifications.

== See also ==
- Japan Railways locomotive numbering and classification
- JNR Class C50
- JNR Class C56
- List of operational steam locomotives in Japan
