= JNR Class C50 =

Class of 158 Japanese 2-6-0 steam locomotives

JNR Class C50 Taiwan Railways Class CT230
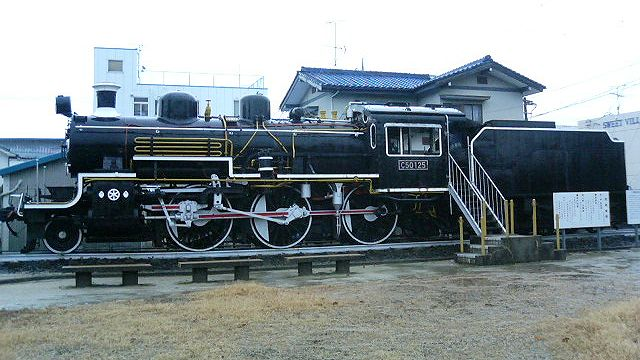
- Preserved C50 125 in January 2006
Type and origin
- Power type: Steam
- Builder: Kawasaki Heavy Industries, Kisha Seizo, Nippon Sharyo, Hitachi, and Mitsubishi
- Build date: 1929-1933
Specifications
- Configuration
  - Whyte: 2-6-0
- Gauge: 1,067 mm (3 ft 6 in)
- Driver dia.: 1,600 mm (5 ft 3 in)
- Length: 16,680 mm (54 ft 9 in)
- Height: 3,885 mm (12 ft 9.0 in)
- Loco weight: 52.8 t (52.0 long tons; 58.2 short tons)
- Total weight: 87.7 t (86.3 long tons; 96.7 short tons)
- Fuel type: Coal
- Cylinder size: 470 mm × 610 mm (19 in × 24 in)
Career
- Operators: JNR; Taiwan Railways
- Number in class: JNR: 154; TRA: 5
- Numbers: JNR: C50 1−154; TRA: CT231−CT235
- Preserved: 6
- Disposition: Withdrawn

The Class C50 (C50形) is a type of 2-6-0 steam locomotive built in Japan from 1929 to 1933. A total of 154 Class C50 locomotives were built, with manufacturing shared by Kawasaki Heavy Industries, Kisha Seizo, Nippon Sharyo, Hitachi, and Mitsubishi. They were designed by Hideo Shima.

Five were supplied to the Taiwan Government Railway, where they were classified class CT230.

== Preserved examples ==
As of 2014, six Class C50 locomotives have been preserved in Japan, as follows.

- C50 75: Preserved in Kitashikahama Transport Park in Adachi, Tokyo
- C50 96: Preserved in Koishikawa Park in Yaizu, Shizuoka
- C50 103: Preserved at the Minamisoma Museum in Minamisoma, Fukushima
- C50 123: Preserved in Station East Park in Oyama, Tochigi
- C50 125: Preserved in Station South Park in Yanai, Yamaguchi
- C50 154: Preserved in Kannonzan Park in Kameyama, Mie
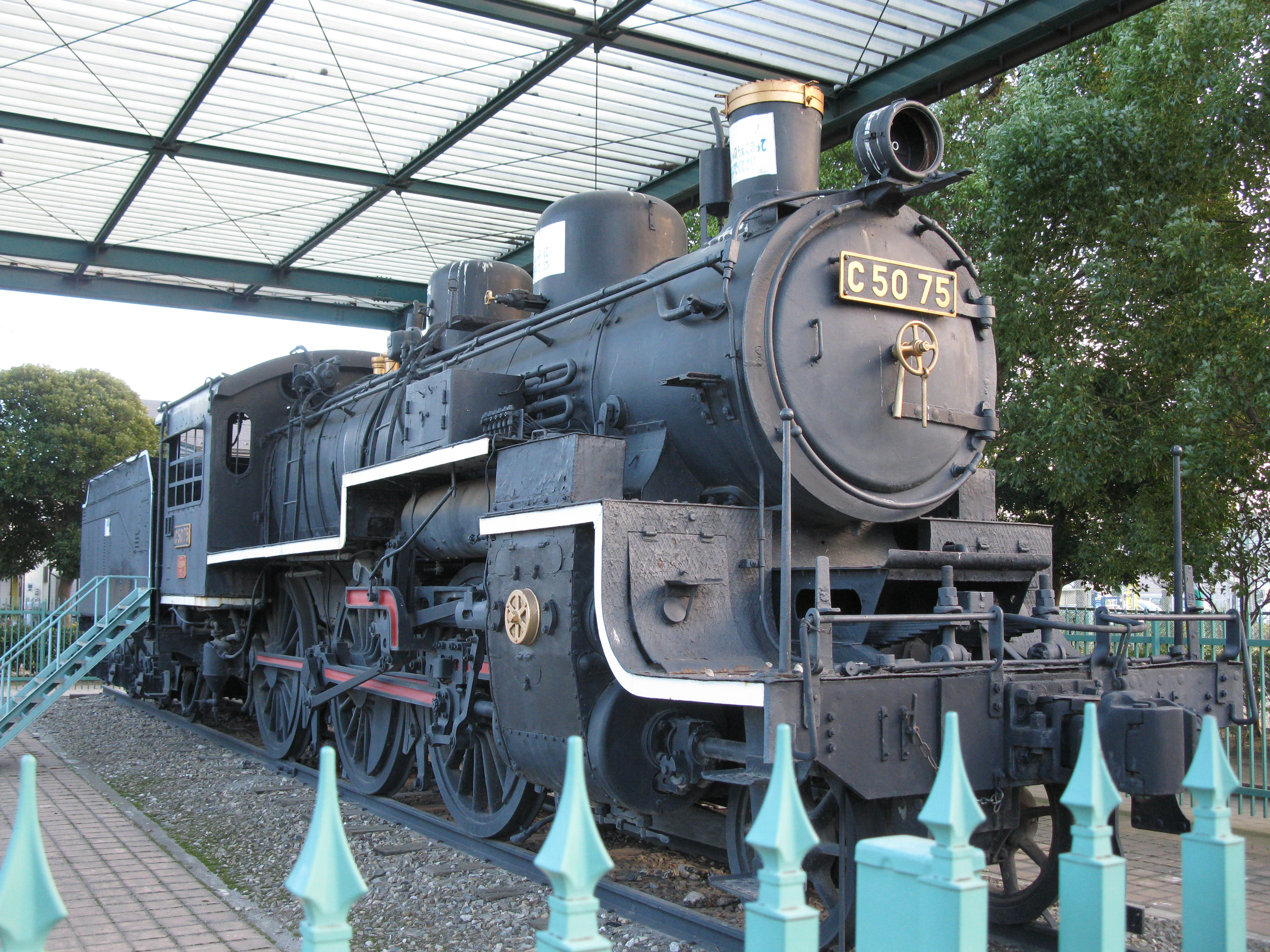
Preserved C50 75 in January 2011

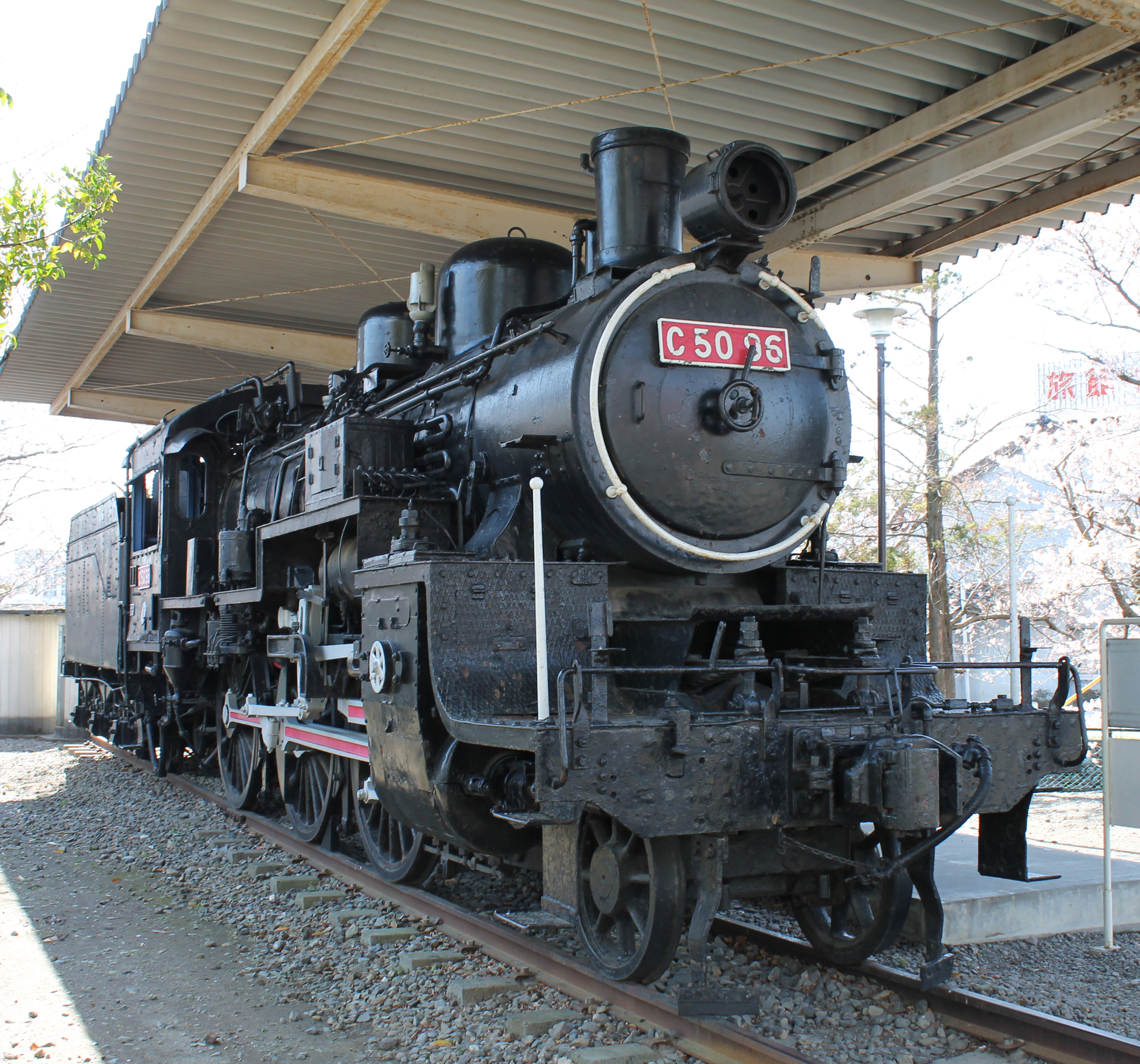
Preserved C50 96 in April 2012

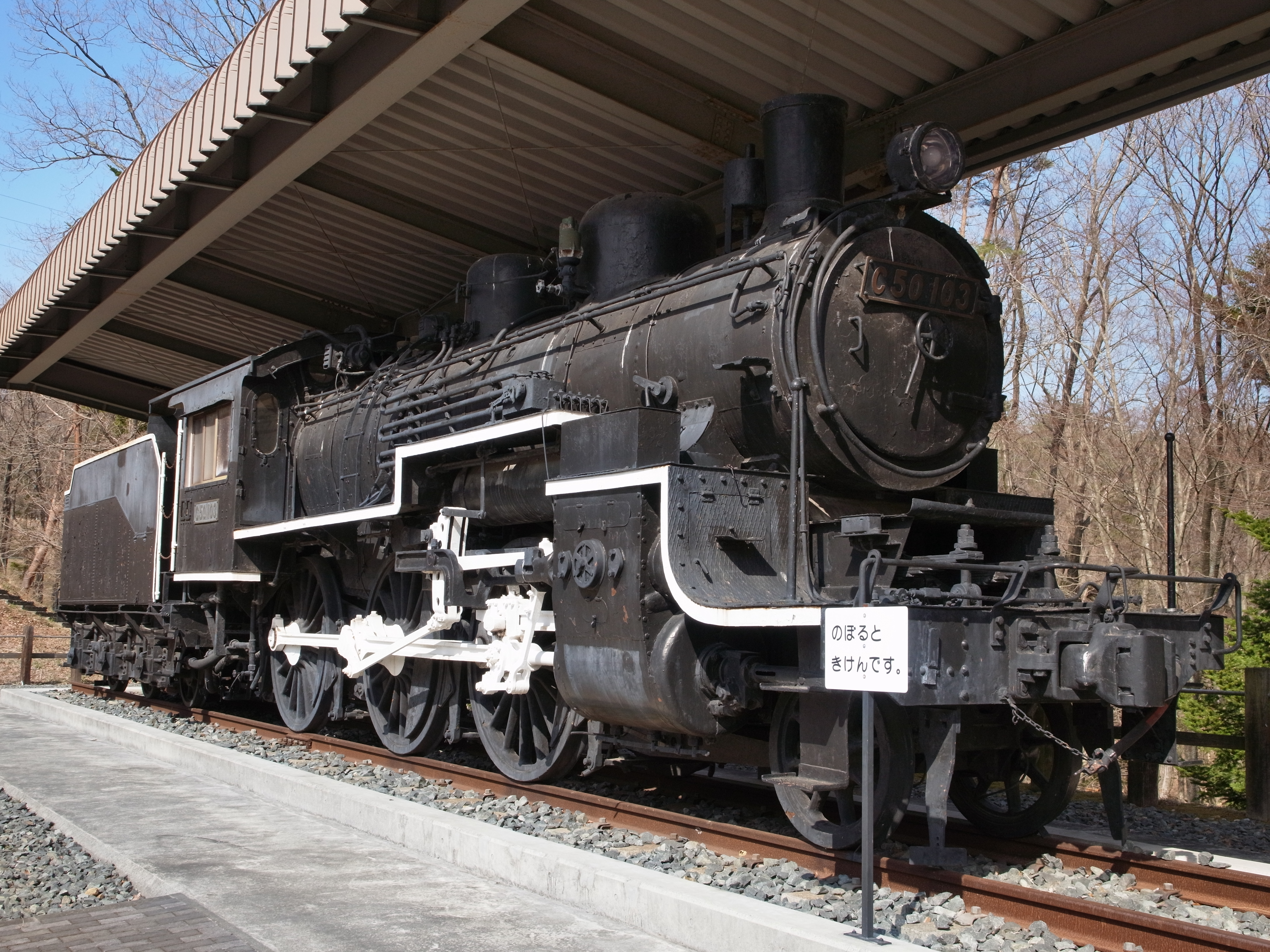
Preserved C50 103 in Minamisoma in April 2012

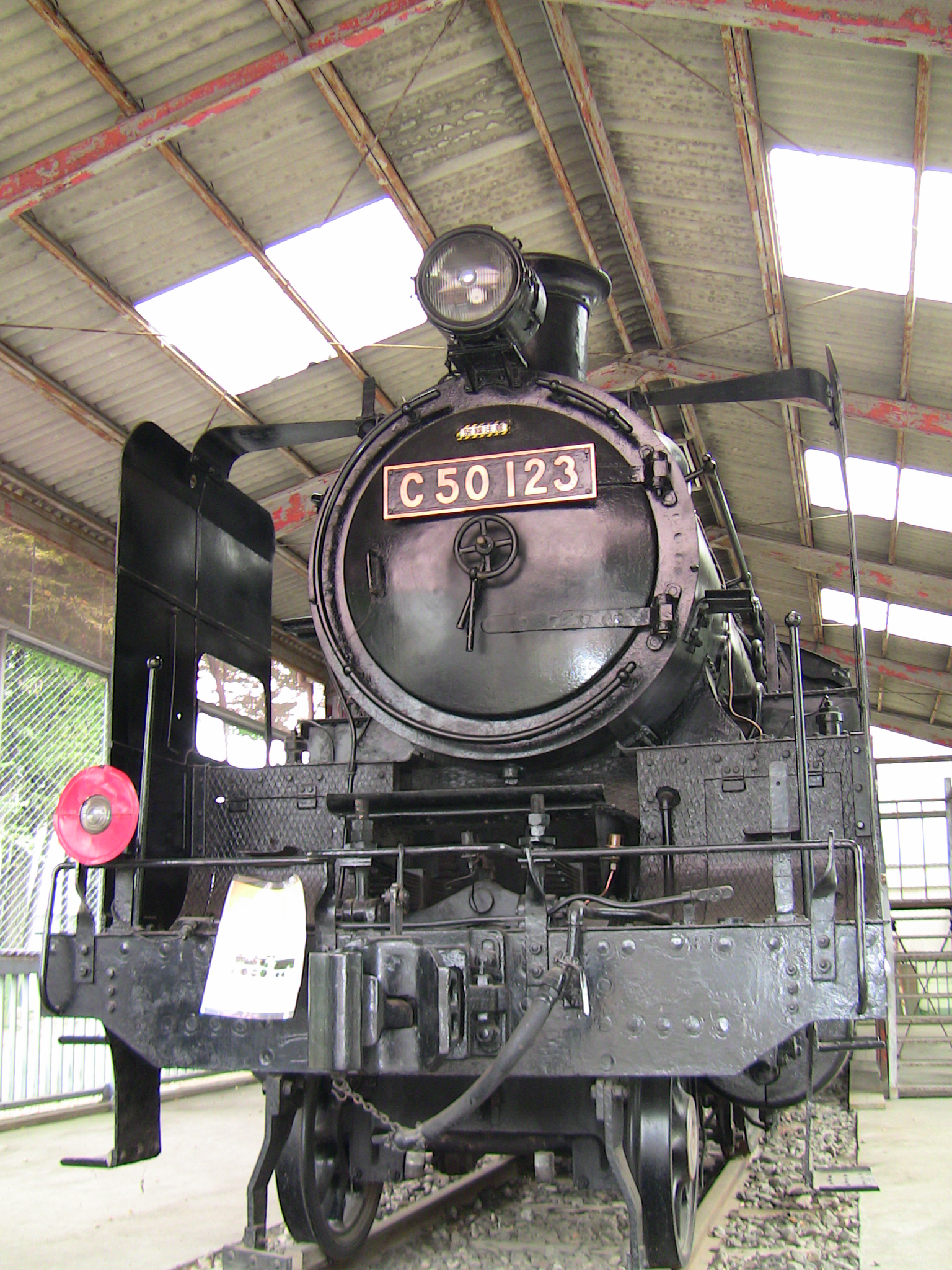
Preserved C50 123 preserved in Oyama

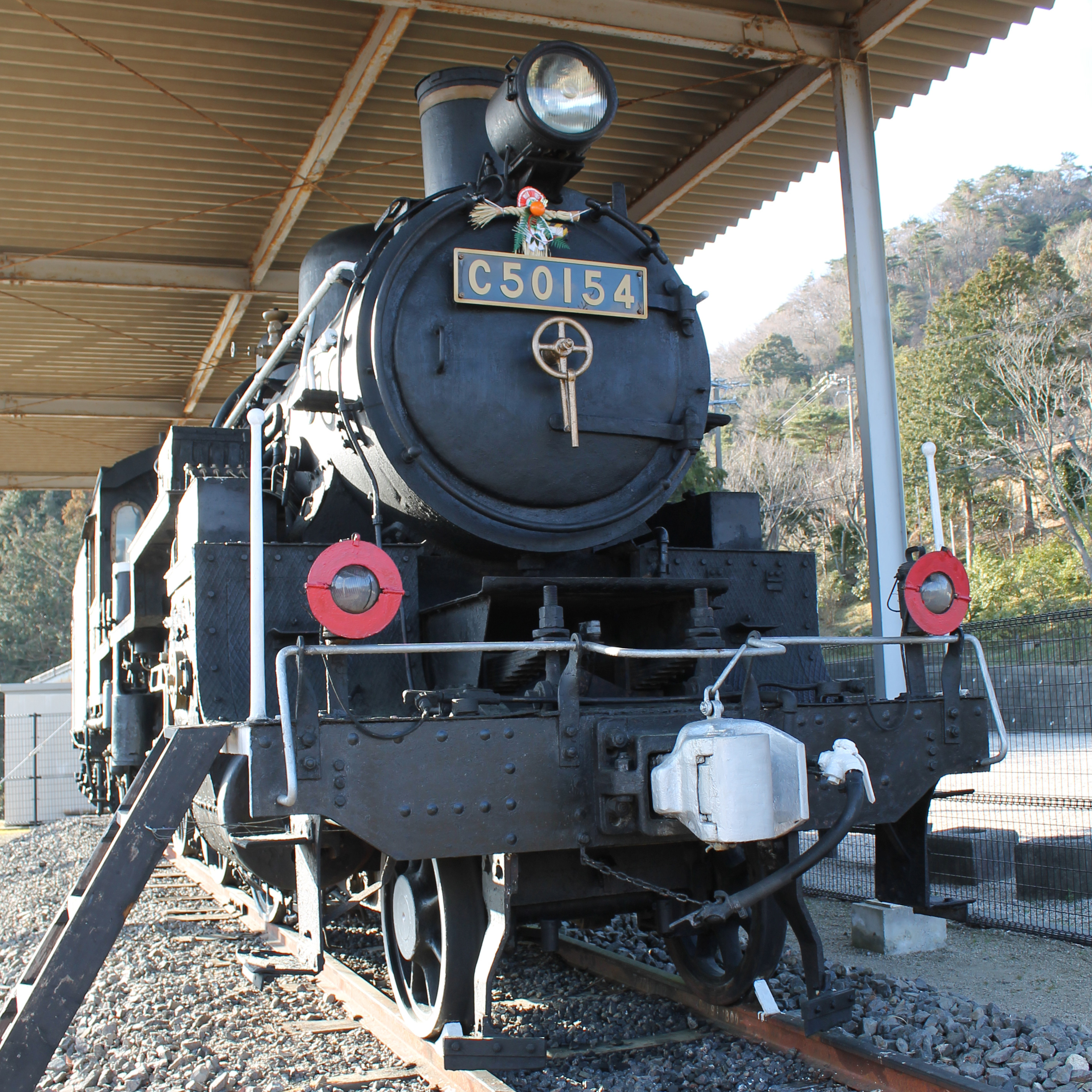
Preserved C50 154 in March 2012

== See also ==
- Japan Railways locomotive numbering and classification
- JGR Class 8620
- JNR Class C56
