= Naraguchi Station =

Railway station in Kuma, Kumamoto Prefecture, Japan

Naraguchi Station 那良口駅
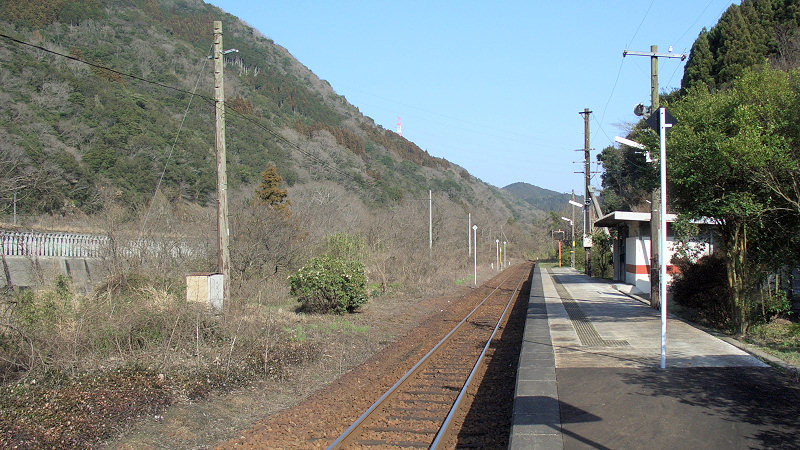
- Naraguchi Station in February 2007

General information
- Location: Japan
- Coordinates: 32°14′37″N 130°40′04″E
- Operator: JR Kyushu
- Line: ■ Hisatsu Line
- Platforms: 1 side platform
- Tracks: 1

Other information
- Website: Official website
Location
- Location within Japan

Naraguchi Station (那良口駅, Naraguchi-eki) is a railway station on the Hisatsu Line in Kuma, Kumamoto, Japan, operated by Kyushu Railway Company (JR Kyushu). It has a single side platform serving one bi-directional track.

== Adjacent stations ==
←	Service	→
Hisatsu Line
Isshōchi	Local	Watari

== See also ==
- List of railway stations in Japan
