= Kuma, Kumamoto =

Village in Kyushu, Japan

Kuma 球磨村
- Village
- Flag Emblem

- Location of Kuma in Kumamoto Prefecture

- Location in Japan
- Coordinates: 32°15′N 130°39′E
- Country: Japan
- Region: Kyushu
- Prefecture: Kumamoto Prefecture
- District: Kuma

Area
  - Total: 207.58 km^{2} (80.15 sq mi)

Population (May 1, 2024)
  - Total: 2,723
  - Density: 13.12/km^{2} (33.98/sq mi)
- Time zone: UTC+09:00 (JST)
- City hall address: 1730 Ōaza Watarihei, Kuma-mura, Kuma-gun, Kumamoto-ken; 869-6401
- Website: www.kumamura.com
- Symbols
- Bird: Common kingfisher
- Flower: Sakura
- Tree: Cryptomeria

Kuma (球磨村, Kuma-mura) is a village located in Kuma District, Kumamoto Prefecture, Japan.

As of May 1, 2024 the village had an estimated population of 2,723 and a population density of 13 persons per km^{2}. The total area is 207.58 km^{2}.

Located in the southern portion of Kumamoto Prefecture, the Kuma River flows through the center. 90% of the village is covered by forests.

One of Japan's largest limestone caves, Kyūsen-dō, is located in Kuma. There are two large mountains located near Kuma village. In addition, there are several mountains measuring under 700 meters whose tributaries feed into the Kuma river. The average rain fall in Kuma Mura is roughly 2,300 millimeters.

Kuma village has a variety of symbols including the Japanese cedar tree, the mountain cherry blossoms, the kingfisher, and the sweet fish.

The main industries of Kuma Village are forestry and agriculture.

Kuma village can be accessed by rail via the JR Kyushu Hisatsu Line. There are three train stations located in the Kuma district: Watari Station, Naraguchi Station and Isshōchi Station.

== See also ==
- 2020 Kyushu floods
