= Isshōchi Station =

Railway station in Kuma, Kumamoto Prefecture, Japan

Isshōchi Station 一勝地駅
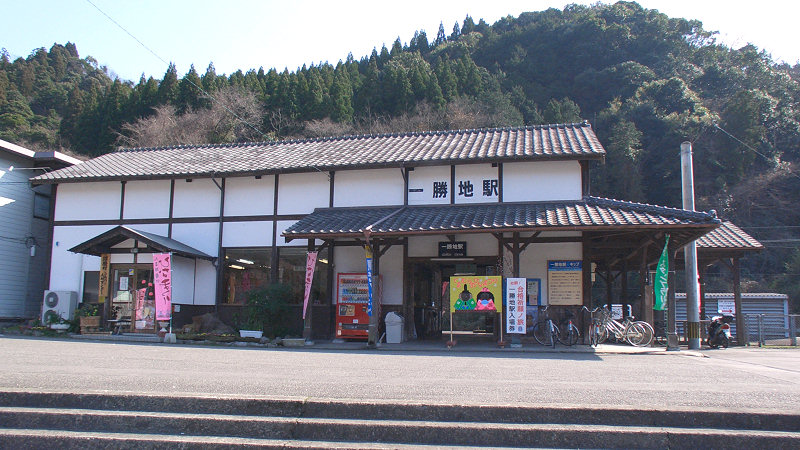
- Isshōchi Station in February 2007

General information
- Location: Japan
- Coordinates: 32°15′01″N 130°39′09″E
- Operator: JR Kyushu
- Line: ■ Hisatsu Line

Other information
- Website: Official website
Location
- Location within Japan

Isshōchi Station (一勝地駅, Isshōchi-eki) is a railway station on the Hisatsu Line in Kuma, Kumamoto, Japan, operated by Kyushu Railway Company (JR Kyushu); the station also houses the Kuma Village Tourist Information Center.

== Lines ==
Isshōchi Station is served by the Hisatsu Line.

== Adjacent stations ==
←	Service	→
Hisatsu Line
Kyūsendō	Local	Naraguchi

== See also ==
- List of railway stations in Japan
