= Shiroishi Station (Kumamoto) =

Railway station in Ashikita, Kumamoto Prefecture, Japan

Shiroishi Station 白石駅
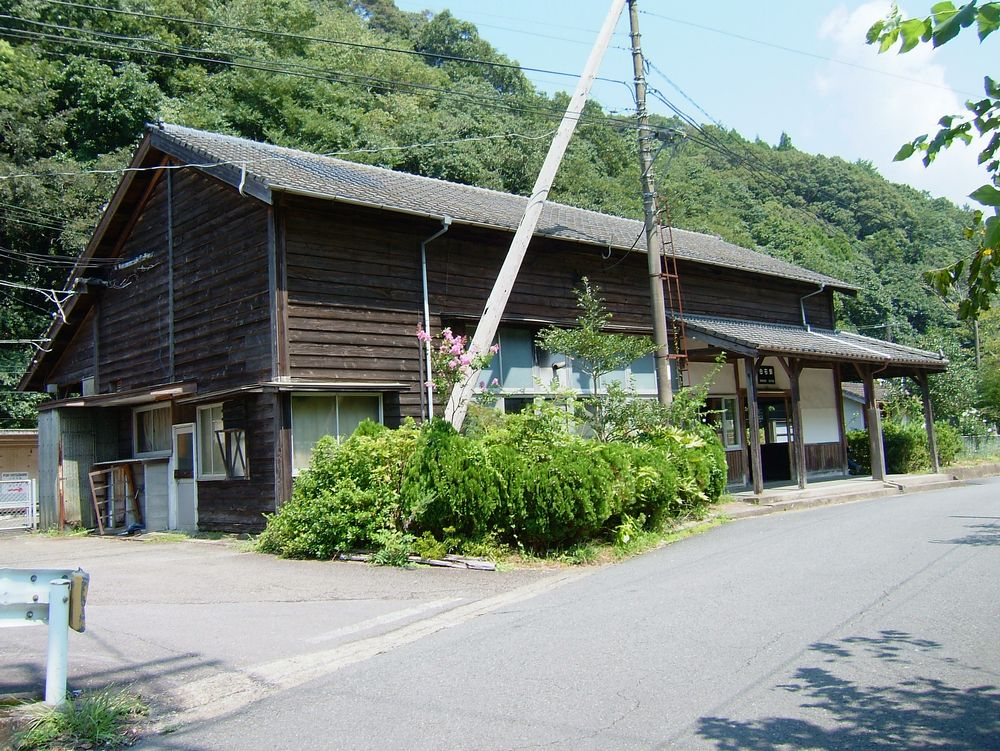
- Shiroishi Station in August 2006

General information
- Location: Japan
- Coordinates: 32°18′21″N 130°36′30″E
- Operator: JR Kyushu
- Line: ■ Hisatsu Line

Other information
- Website: Official website
Location
- Location within Japan

Shiroishi Station (白石駅, Shiroishi-eki) is a railway station on the Hisatsu Line in Ashikita, Kumamoto, Japan, operated by Kyushu Railway Company (JR Kyushu).

== Lines ==
Shiroishi Station is served by the Hisatsu Line.

== Adjacent stations ==
←	Service	→
Hisatsu Line
Yoshio	Local	Kyūsendō

== See also ==
- List of railway stations in Japan
