= Watari Station (Kumamoto) =

Railway station in Kuma, Kumamoto Prefecture, Japan

Watari Station 渡駅
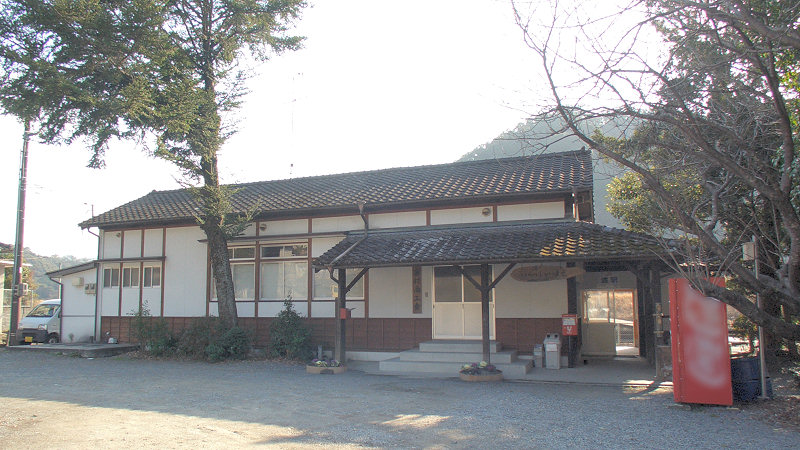
- Watari Station in February 2007

General information
- Location: Kuma, Kumamoto; Japan
- Coordinates: 32°14′12″N 130°41′41″E
- Operator: JR Kyushu
- Line: ■ Hisatsu Line

Other information
- Website: Official website
Location
- Location within Japan

Watari Station (渡駅, Watari-eki) is a railway station on the Hisatsu Line in Kuma, Kumamoto, Japan, operated by Kyushu Railway Company (JR Kyushu).

== Lines ==
Watari Station is served by the Hisatsu Line.

== Adjacent stations ==
←	Service	→
Hisatsu Line
Naraguchi	Local	Nishi-Hitoyoshi

== See also ==
- List of railway stations in Japan
