= Yunoura Station =

Railway station in Ashikita, Kumamoto Prefecture, Japan

Yunoura Station 湯浦駅
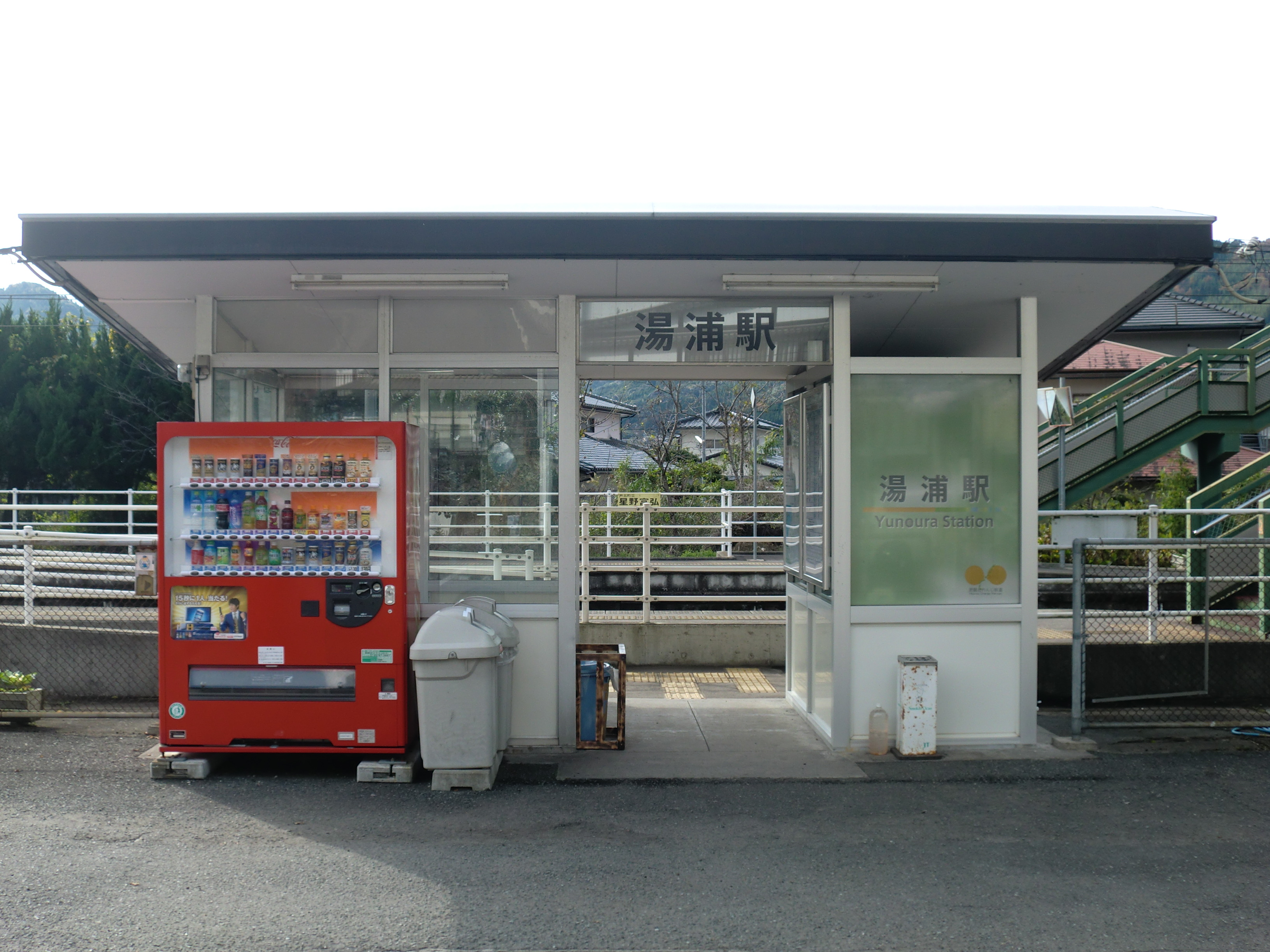
- Small station building in 2010

General information
- Location: Miyazaki, Ashikita-machi, Ashikita-gun, Kumamoto-ken 869-5562; Japan
- Coordinates: 32.27135°N 130.50454°E
- Operator: Hisatsu Orange Railway Co., Ltd.
- Line: Hisatsu Orange Railway
- Distance: 33.7 km from Yatsushiro; 3.9 km from Sashiki
- Platforms: 2 side platforms
- Tracks: 2

Construction
- Structure type: At-grade

Other information
- Website: Official (in Japanese)

History
- Opened: 12 September 1926
- Original company: Japanese Government Railways

Passengers
- FY2019: 156
Location
- Location within Kumamoto Prefecture Location within Japan

Yunoura Station (湯浦駅, Yunoura-eki) is a passenger railway station in the town of Agukita, Kumamoto Prefecture, Japan. It is served by the third-sector railway company Hisatsu Orange Railway

== Lines ==
The station is served by the Hisatsu Orange Railway Line that follows the former coastal route of the JR Kyushu Kagoshima Main Line connecting Yatsushiro and Sendai. It is located 33.7 km from the starting point of the line at Yatsushiro.

== Station layout ==
The station consists of two opposed side platforms at street level, connected by a footbridgeand two tracks. There is no station building, but a simple concrete waiting room. It is unattended.

=== Platforms ===
1	■ ■ Hisatsu Orange Railway	for Minamata and Izumi
2	■ ■ Hisatsu Orange Railway	for Yatsushiro and Shin-Yatsushiro

== Gallery ==
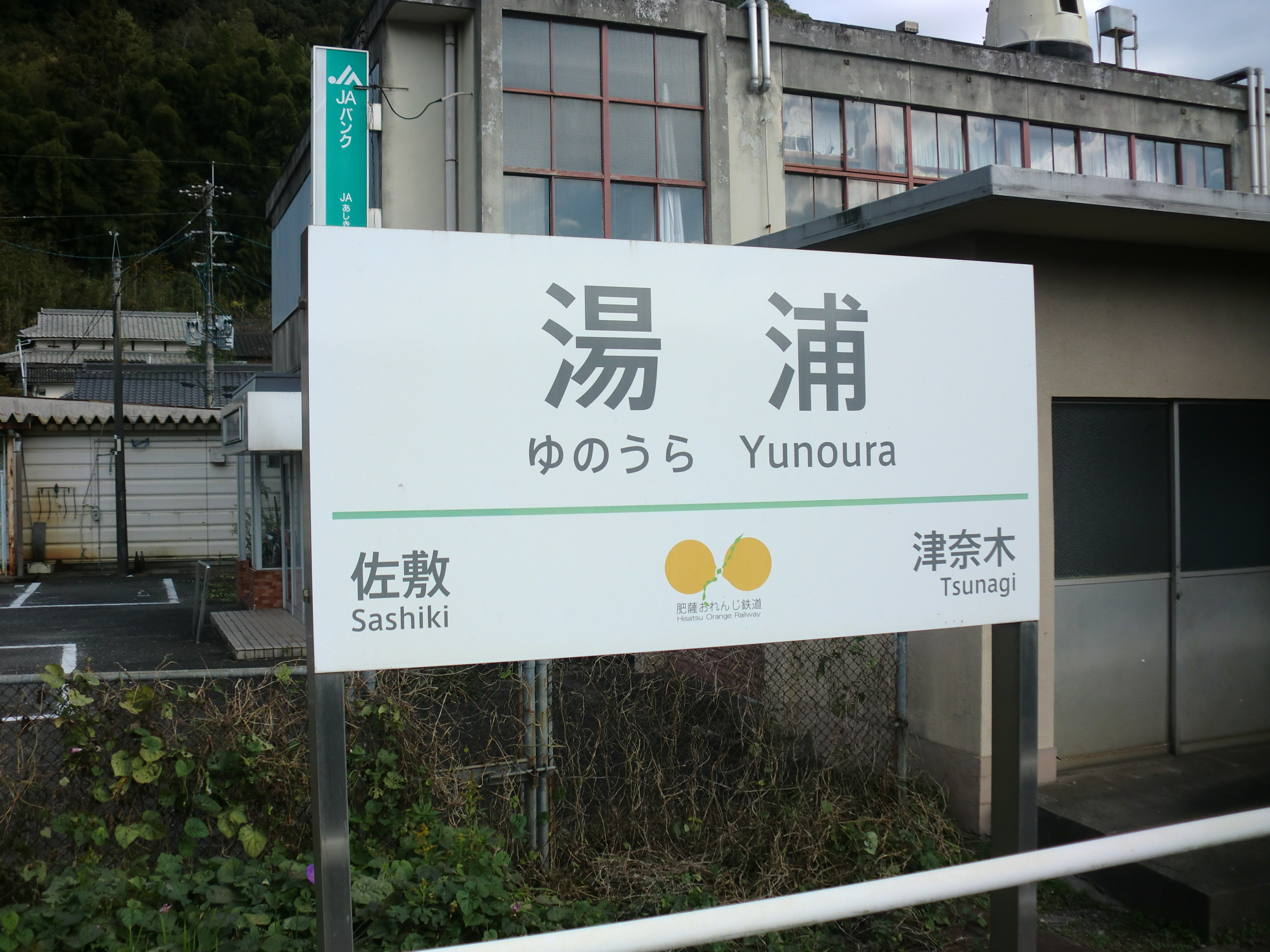
Station sign

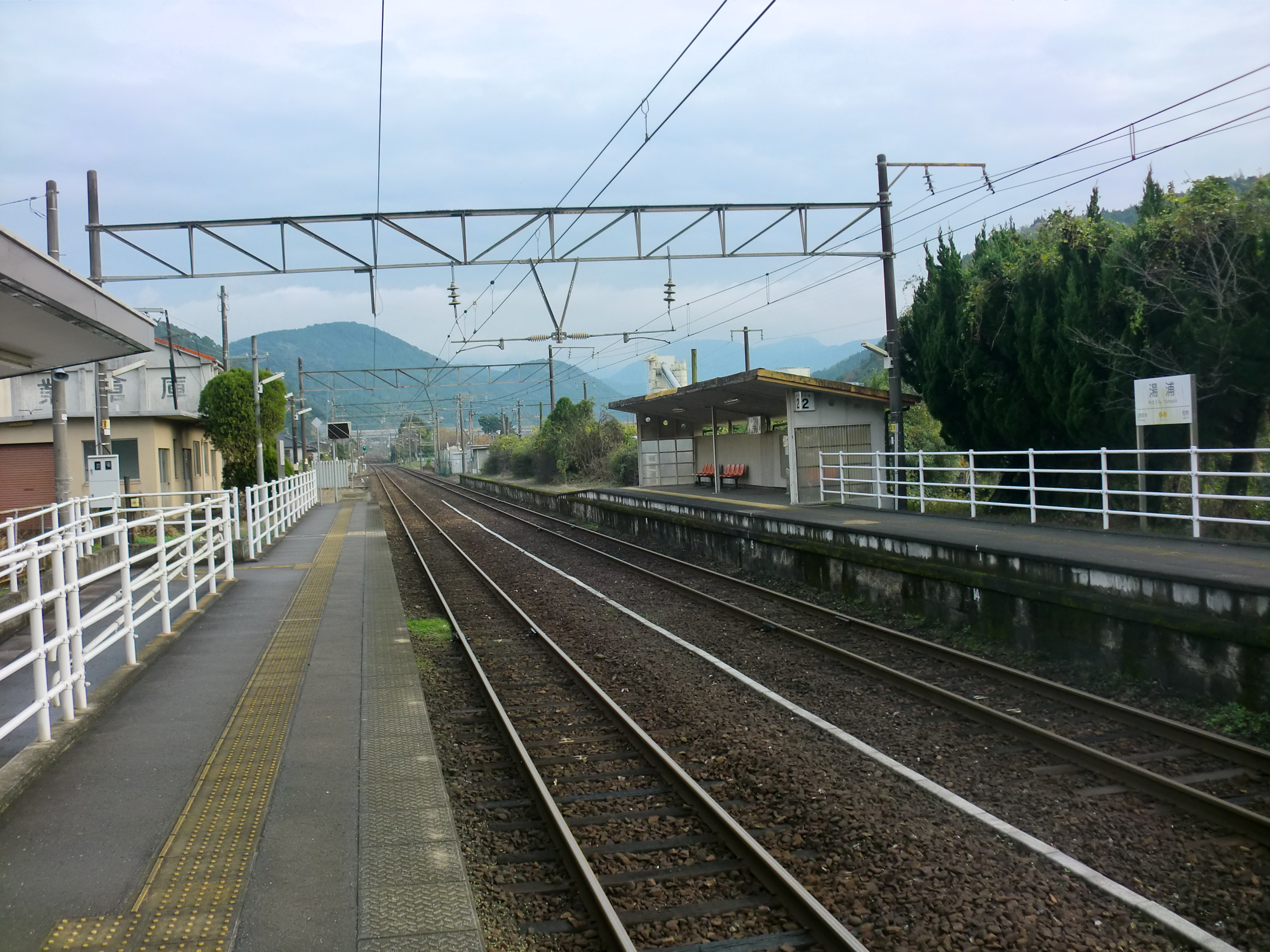
View of station platforms

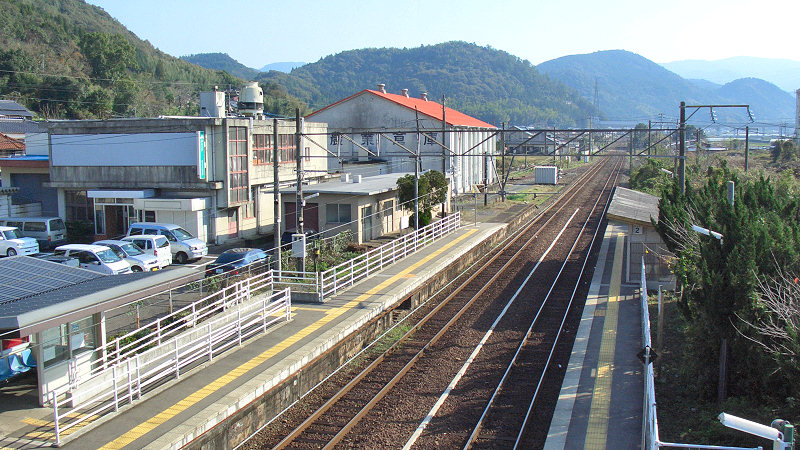
Station platforms and main building

== Adjacent stations ==
«	Service	»
Hisatsu Orange Railway Line
Sashiki	–	Tsunagi
Rapid Express Super Orange: Does not stop at this station

== History ==
Yunoura Station was opened on 12 September 1926 as a station on the Japanese Government Railways Kagoshima Main Line. With the privatization of the Japan National Railways on 1 April 1987, the station was transferred to JR Kyushu. On 13 March 2004, with the opening of the Kyushu Shinkansen, the station was transferred to the Hisatsu Orange Railway.

== Passenger statistics ==
The average daily passenger traffic in fiscal 2019 was 156 passengers.

== Surrounding area ==
- Yunoura onsen
- Ashikita Town Office Yuura Branch
- Ashikita Town Yuura Junior High School
- Ashikita Town Yuura Elementary School

`Ashikita Town Tomihiro Hoshino Art Museum

== See also ==
- List of railway stations in Japan
