= Tsunagi Station =

Railway station in Tsunagi, Kumamoto Prefecture, Japan

Tsunagi Station 津奈木駅
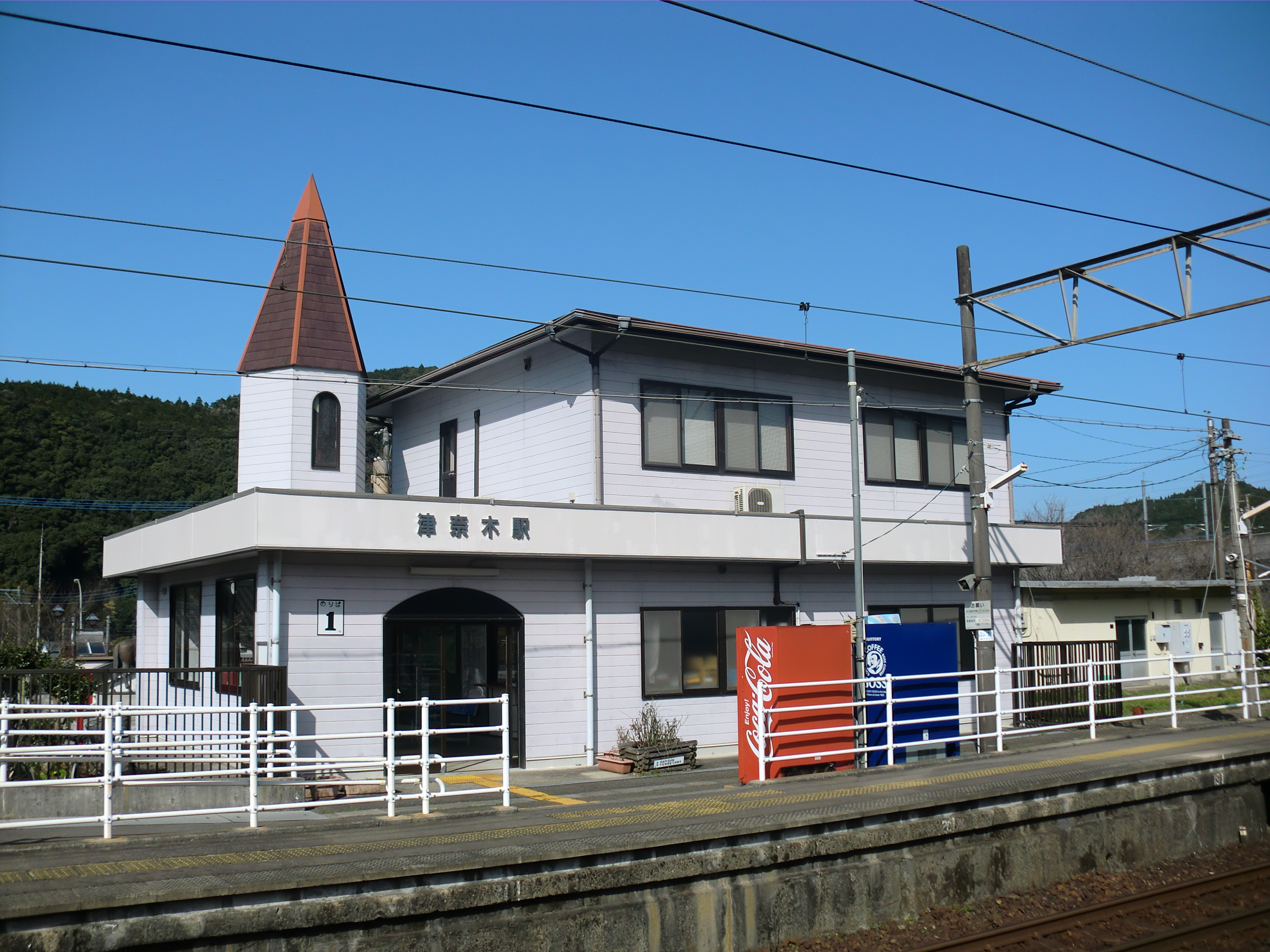
- Station building, platform, and vending machines in 2012

General information
- Location: Iwaki, Tsunagi-machi, Ashikita-gun, Kumamoto-ken 869-5603; Japan
- Coordinates: 32.2324°N 130.45021°E
- Operator: Hisatsu Orange Railway Co., Ltd.
- Line: Hisatsu Orange Railway
- Distance: 42.4 km from Yatsushiro; 8.7 km from Yunoura
- Platforms: 2 side platforms
- Tracks: 2

Construction
- Structure type: At-grade

Other information
- Station code: OR11
- Website: Official (in Japanese)

History
- Opened: 17 October 1927
- Original company: Japanese Government Railways

Passengers
- FY2019: 113
Location
- Location within Kumamoto Prefecture Location within Japan

Tsunagi Station (津奈木駅, Tsunagi-eki) is a passenger railway station in the town of Tsunagi, Kumamoto Prefecture, Japan. It is served by the third-sector railway company Hisatsu Orange Railway

== Lines ==
The station is served by the Hisatsu Orange Railway Line that follows the former coastal route of the JR Kyushu Kagoshima Main Line connecting Yatsushiro and Sendai. It is located 42.4 km from the starting point of the line at Yatsushiro.

== Station layout ==
The station consists of two opposed side platforms at street level, connected by a footbridge. The area from Yunoura Station to this station is double track. The station building is adjacent to the Tsunagi Town Chamber of Commerce.

=== Platforms ===
1	■ ■ Hisatsu Orange Railway	for Yatsushiro
2	■ ■ Hisatsu Orange Railway	for Minamata and Izumi

== Gallery ==
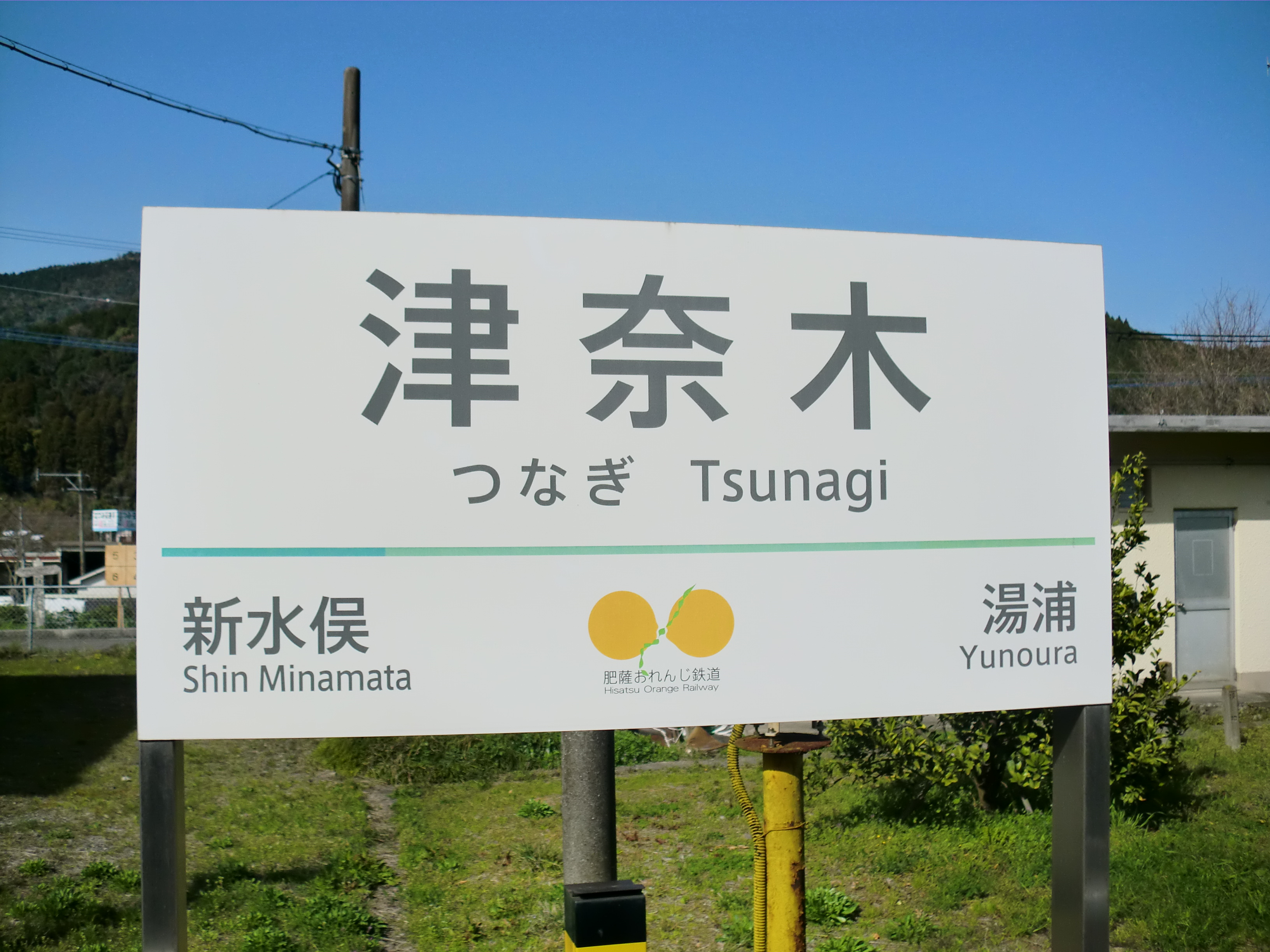
Station sign

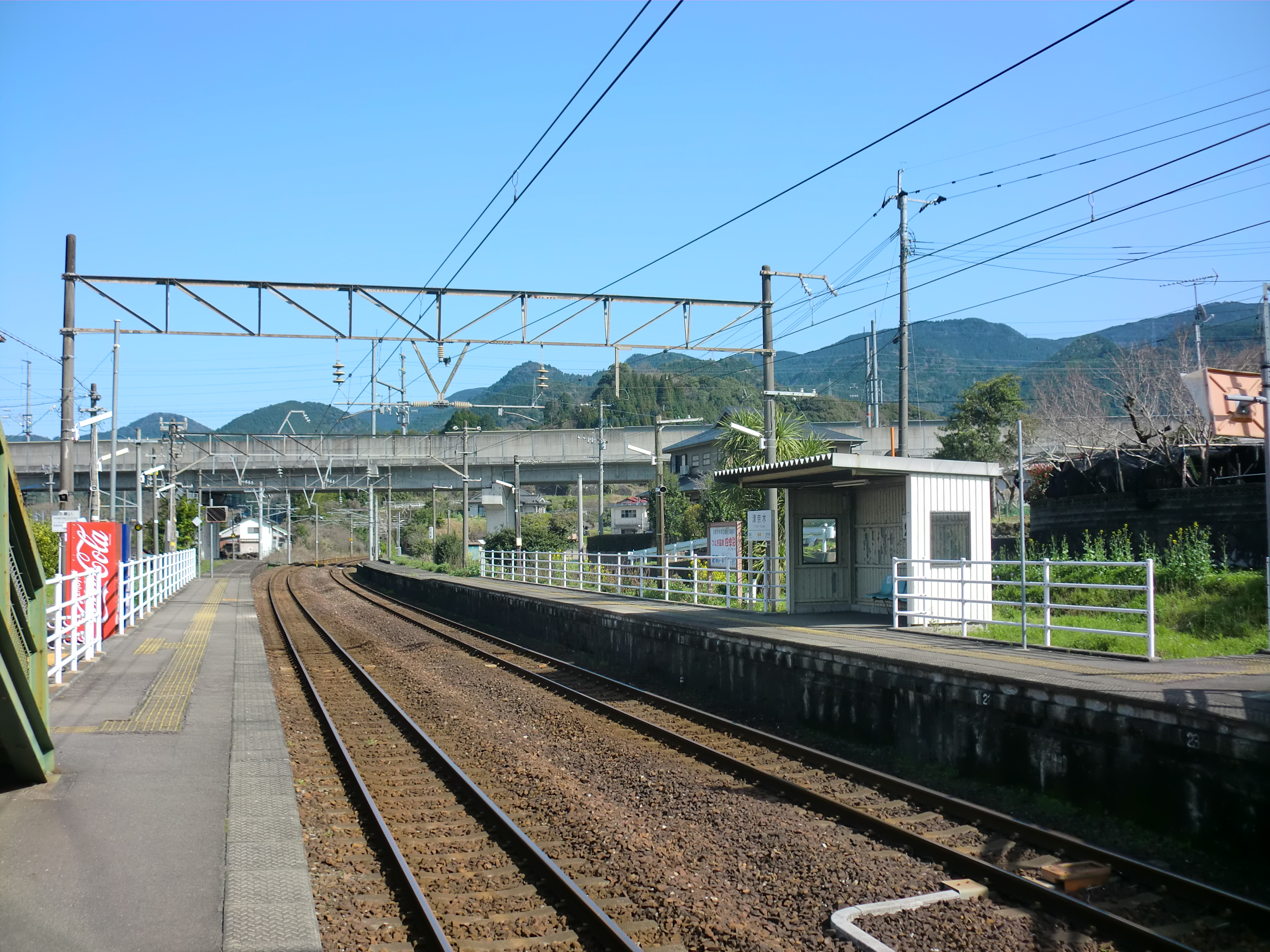
View of station platforms

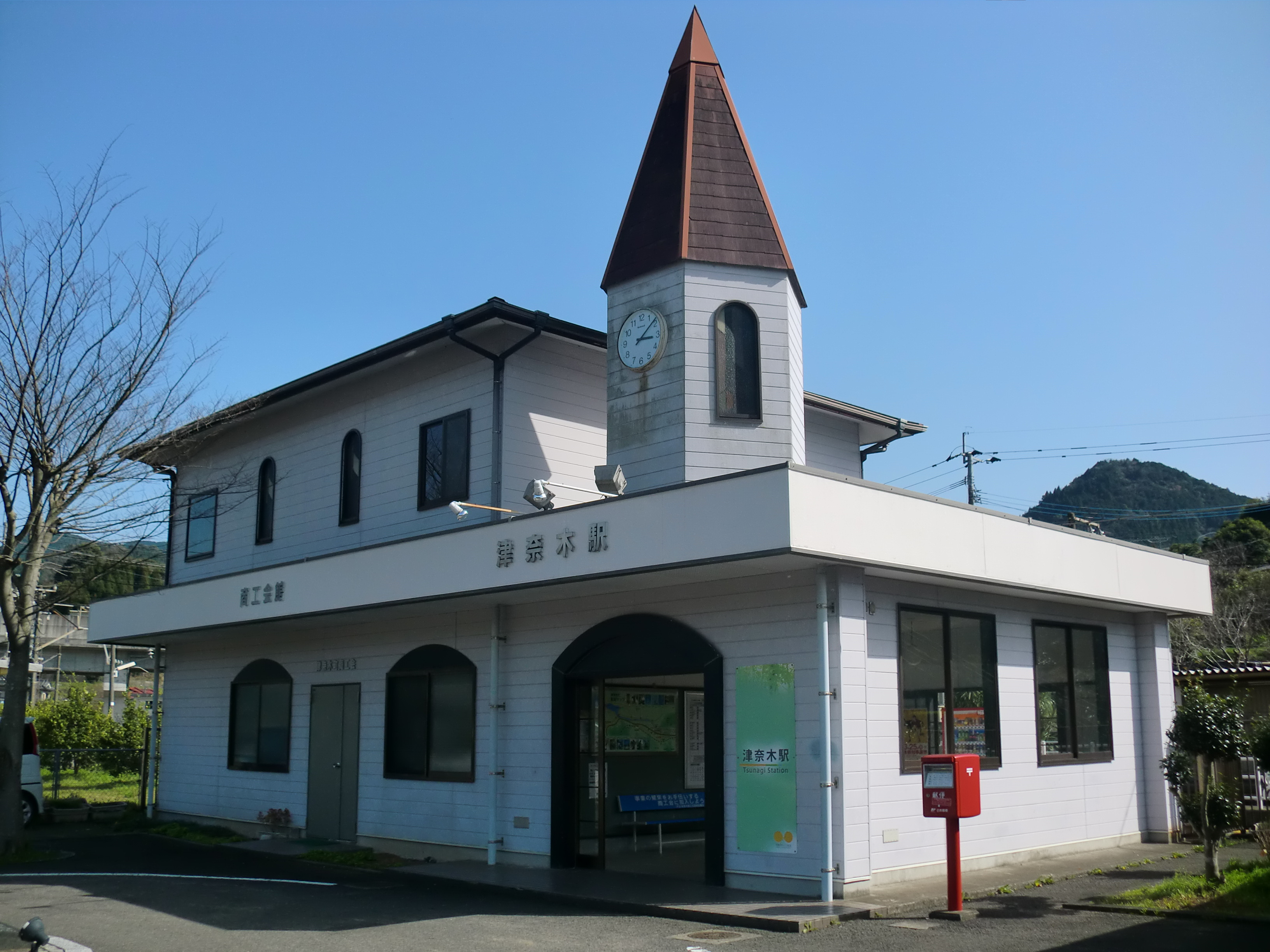
Road-side view of building

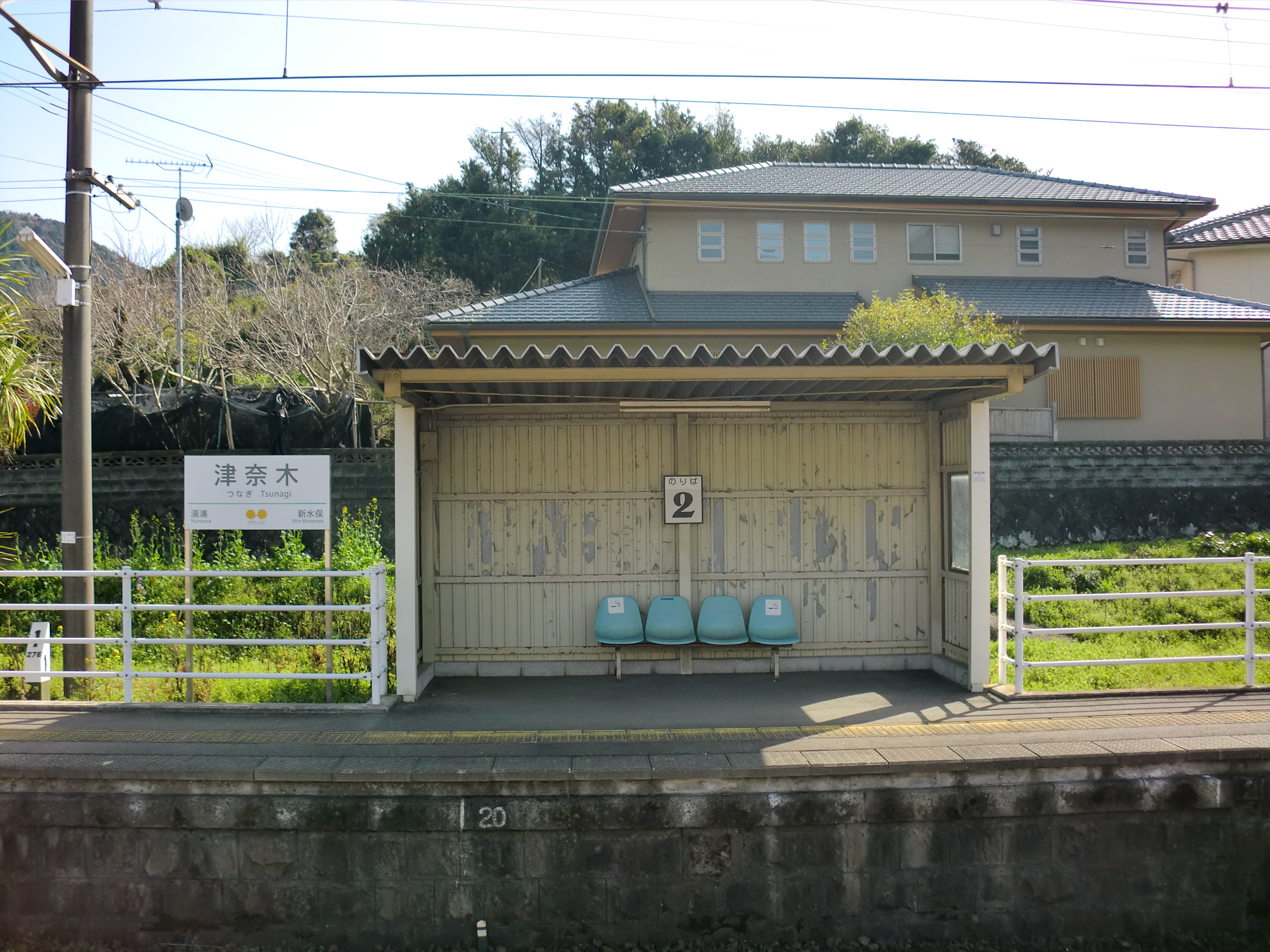
Platform shelter

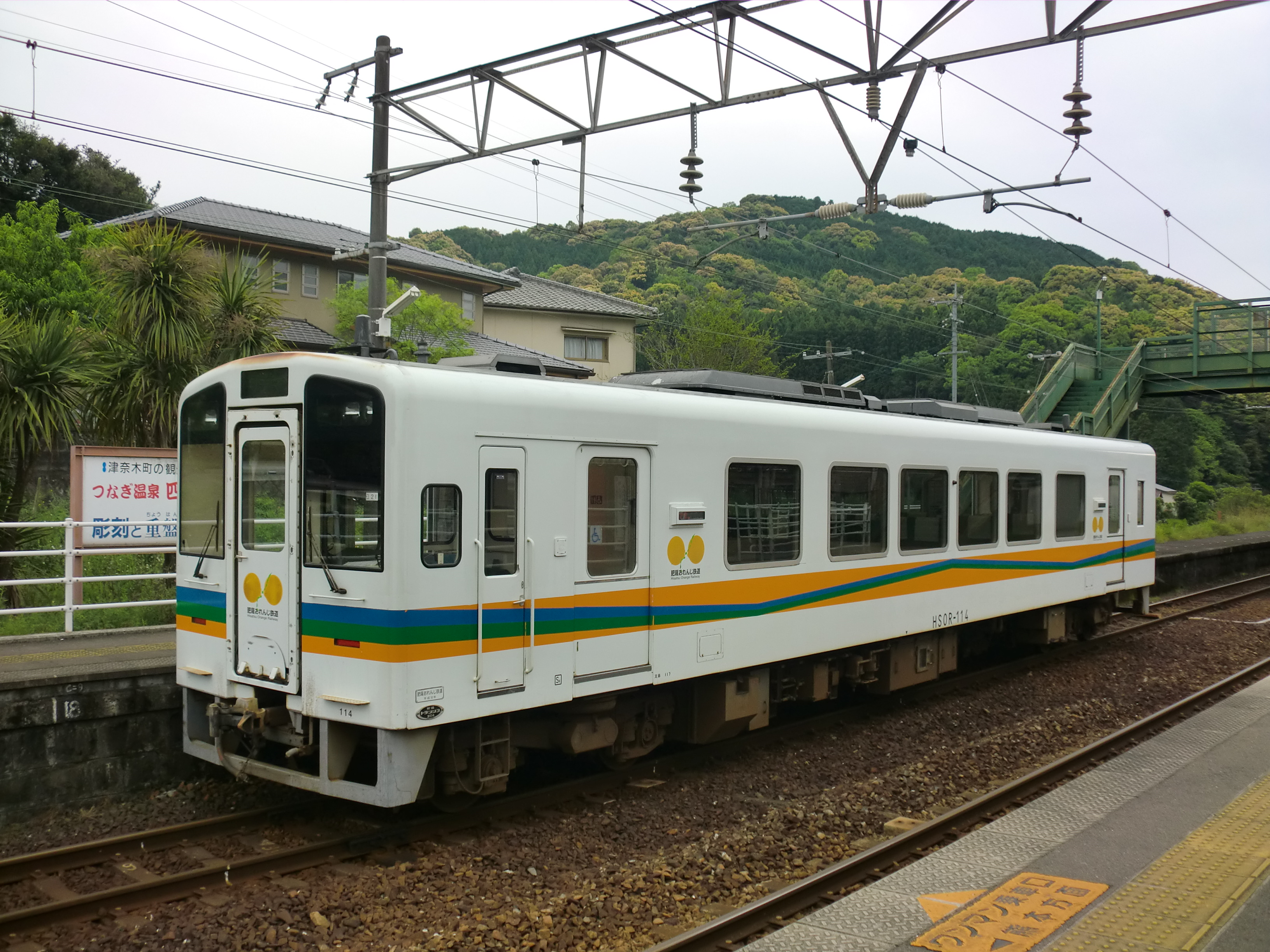
100 series train at station

== Adjacent stations ==
«	Service	»
Hisatsu Orange Railway Line
Yunoura	–	Shin-Minamata
Rapid Express Super Orange: Does not stop at this station

== History ==
Tsunagi Station was opened on 17 October 1927 as a station on the Japanese Government Railways Kagoshima Main Line. With the privatization of the Japan National Railways on 1 April 1987, the station was transferred to JR Kyushu. On 13 March 2004, with the opening of the Kyushu Shinkansen, the station was transferred to the Hisatsu Orange Railway.

== Passenger statistics ==
The average daily passenger traffic in fiscal 2019 was 113 passengers.

== Surrounding area ==
- Japan National Route 3
- Tsunagi Town Tsunagi Elementary School
- Tsunagi Town Tsunagi Junior High School

== See also ==
- List of railway stations in Japan
