= Joyful Train =

Japanese train sets used for charters, special events and tourist excursions

Joyful Train (ジョイフルトレイン, joifuru torein) is the name given to railway rolling stock or train sets operated by the JR Group in Japan primarily for charters, special events, tourist excursions, and other similar purposes. Traditionally, this term is only used for chartered trains dedicated to large group travel, but in recent years, it has expanded to include sightseeing trains and tourist trains as well, often called notte tanoshii ressha (のってたのしい列車; lit. 'fun-to-ride train') in Japanese, and their distinctions are made ambiguous. This page includes all trains considered "Joyful trains" and "Sightseeing trains".

== History ==
=== Origins ===
The "Joyful Train" concept can be traced back to 1960, when a 1935-vintage SuHaShi 29 dining car was converted into a Japanese-style o-zashiki train with tatami flooring and shoji paper screens on the windows. This could be coupled to regular service trains for use by charter parties. A second car was similarly modified in April 1961.

The first train to directly be called "Joyful Train" was the Salon Express Tokyo, a European styled train. The term has since been applied in retrospect to all trains produced before then that fits the descriptions. Many conversions of trains were done due to surplus rolling stock after the abolishment of certain express lines, and purpose-built Joyful Trains are rare. All cars on a Joyful Train are considered Green Cars.

=== Recent years ===
Since the bursting of Japan's Bubble Economy, small group travel using buses have become more mainstream, and opportunities to use group trains have decreased, and so have been the demand of European style salon trains. Some JR companies such as JR Kyushu once completely abolished chartered trains in order to save costs, and European-styled Salon Trains disappeared from JR Central's rolling stock after the retirement of the Euroliner in 2004.

On the other hand, this shift has led JR companies to target individual travellers directly with sightseeing trains, in an attempt to increase regional development. The first JR-operated train to be referred to as a 'tourist train' was the Nostalgic View Train, launched by JR East in 1990. Unlike previous Group trains, the Nostalgic View Train exclusively operated on the Gono Line as a primarily sightseeing-oriented service. Due to the popularity of the train, it was later supplanted and replaced by the Resort Shirakami which continue to operate today, and other JR East lines followed suit with Kirakira Uetsu on the Uetsu Line (later replaced by the Kairi) and Kirakira Michinoku in the Nanbu area of Aomori. Onboard such tourist-oriented trains, one can enjoy local products, famous sake, or other activities. Sometimes, JR companies has not used the term "Joyful Train" to refer to tourist trains, but since tourist trains are often operated as group trains as well, railway hobby magazines often use both terms, if not use them interchangeably.

== Lines in operation ==
=== JR Hokkaido ===
==== DMU ====
Name	Japanese	Classification	No. of cars	Accommodation	Introduced	Converted from	Depot/region	Remarks
Dōhoku Ryūhyō no Megumi	道北 流氷の恵み	KiHa 40 series	1	Seating	2018	KiHa 40	-	Part of the Hokkaidō no Megumi (Blessings of Hokkaido) set. Name means "Northern Hokkaido: Blessing of Drift Ice".
Dōtō Mori no Megumi	道東 森の恵み	KiHa 40 series	1	Seating	2018	KiHa 40	-	Part of the Hokkaidō no Megumi (Blessings of Hokkaido) set. Name means "Eastern Hokkaido: Blessing of the Forest".
Dōnan Kai no Megumi	道南 海の恵み	KiHa 40 series	1	Seating	2018	KiHa 40	-	Part of the Hokkaidō no Megumi (Blessings of Hokkaido) set. Name means "Southern Hokkaido: Blessing of the Sea".
Dōō Hana no Megumi	道央 花の恵み	KiHa 40 series	1	Seating	2018	KiHa 40	-	Part of the Hokkaidō no Megumi (Blessings of Hokkaido) set. Name means "Central Hokkaido: Blessing of Flowers".
Sanmei	山明	KiHa 40 series	1	Seating	2019	KiHa 40	-	Part of the Sanshisuimei set. Both converted due to popular demand after the unveiling of the Hokkaido no Megumi trains.
Shisui	紫水	KiHa 40 series	1	Seating	2019	KiHa 40	-	Part of the Sanshisuimei set.
Ryuhyu Monogatari	流氷物語	KiHa 40 series	2	Seating	2017	KiHa 40	Abashiri	Originally ran by a KiHa 54 series train. Currently runs using two of the aforementioned Hokkaido no Megumi trainsets, being Dohoku Ryuhyo no Megumi and Doto Mori no Megumi.

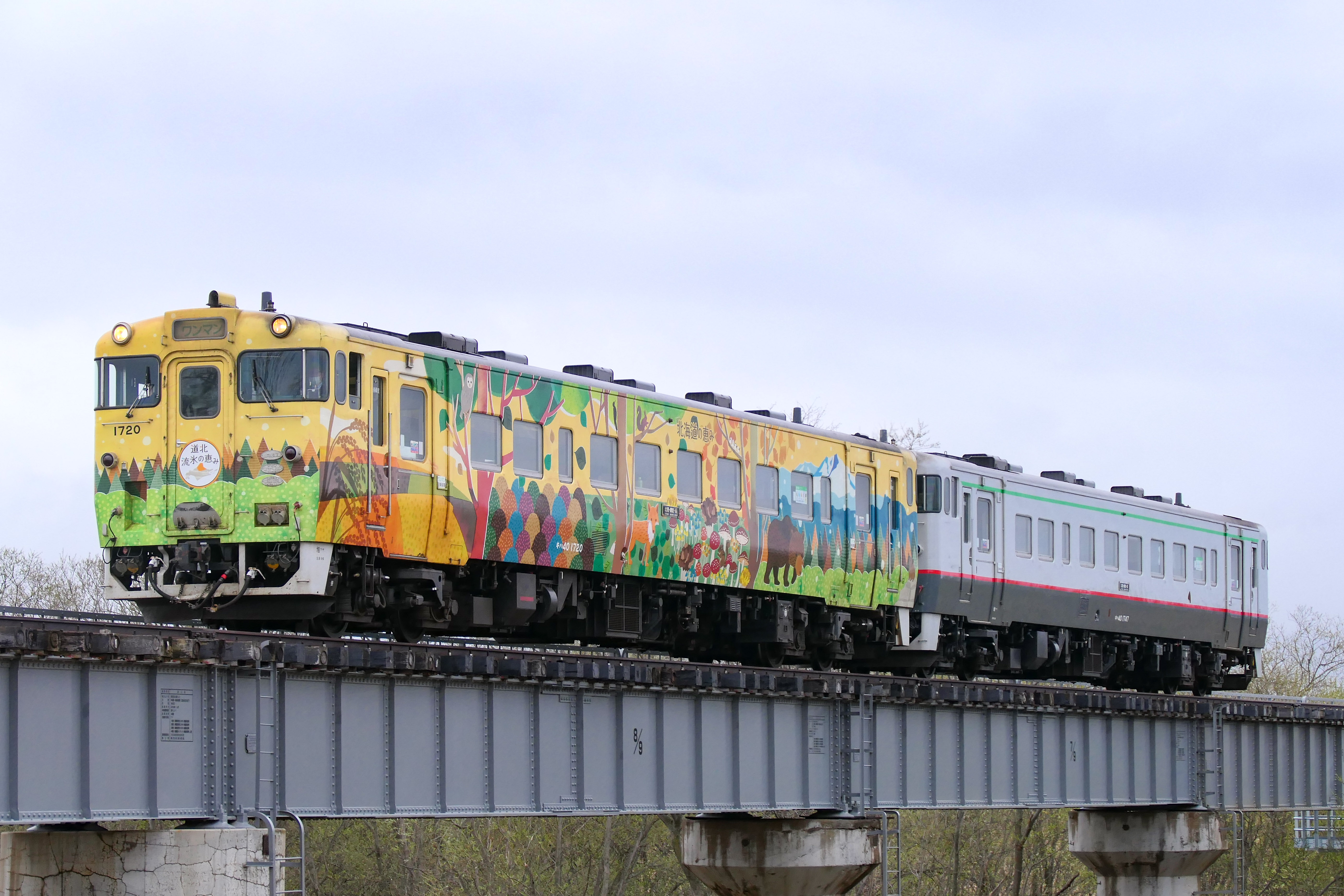
Dōhoku Ryūhyō no Megumi

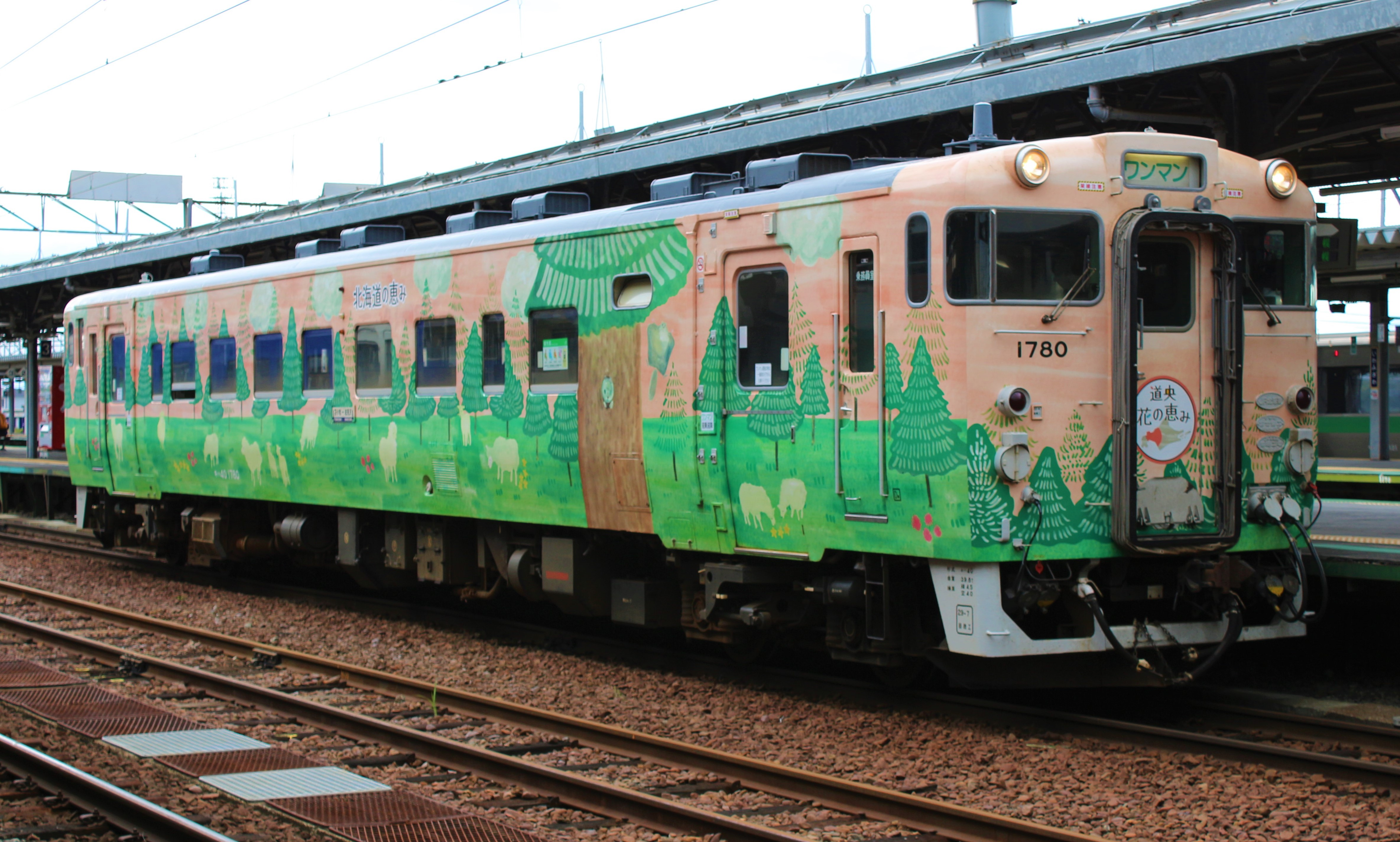
Dōō Hana no Megumi

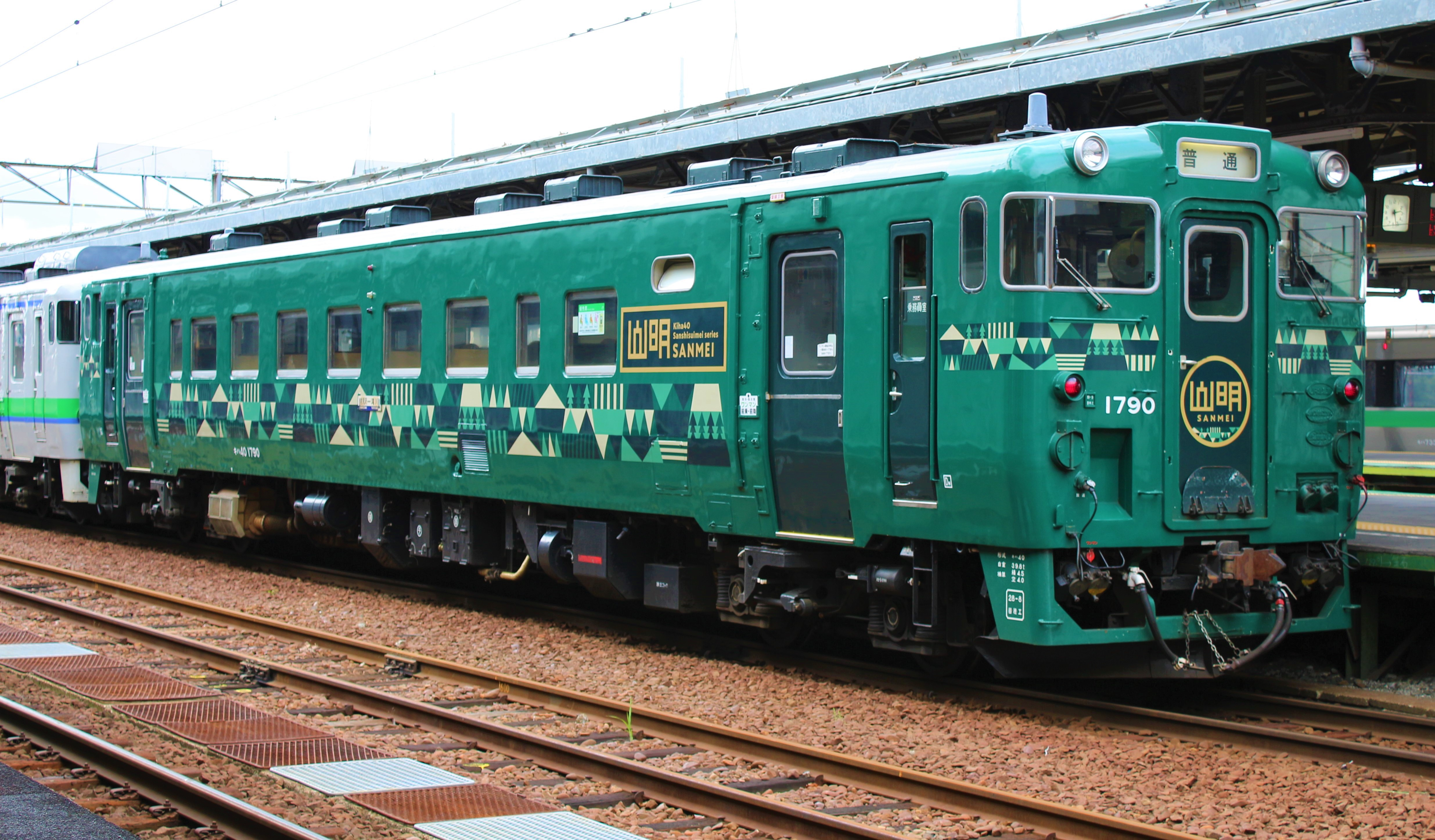
Sanmei, 2020

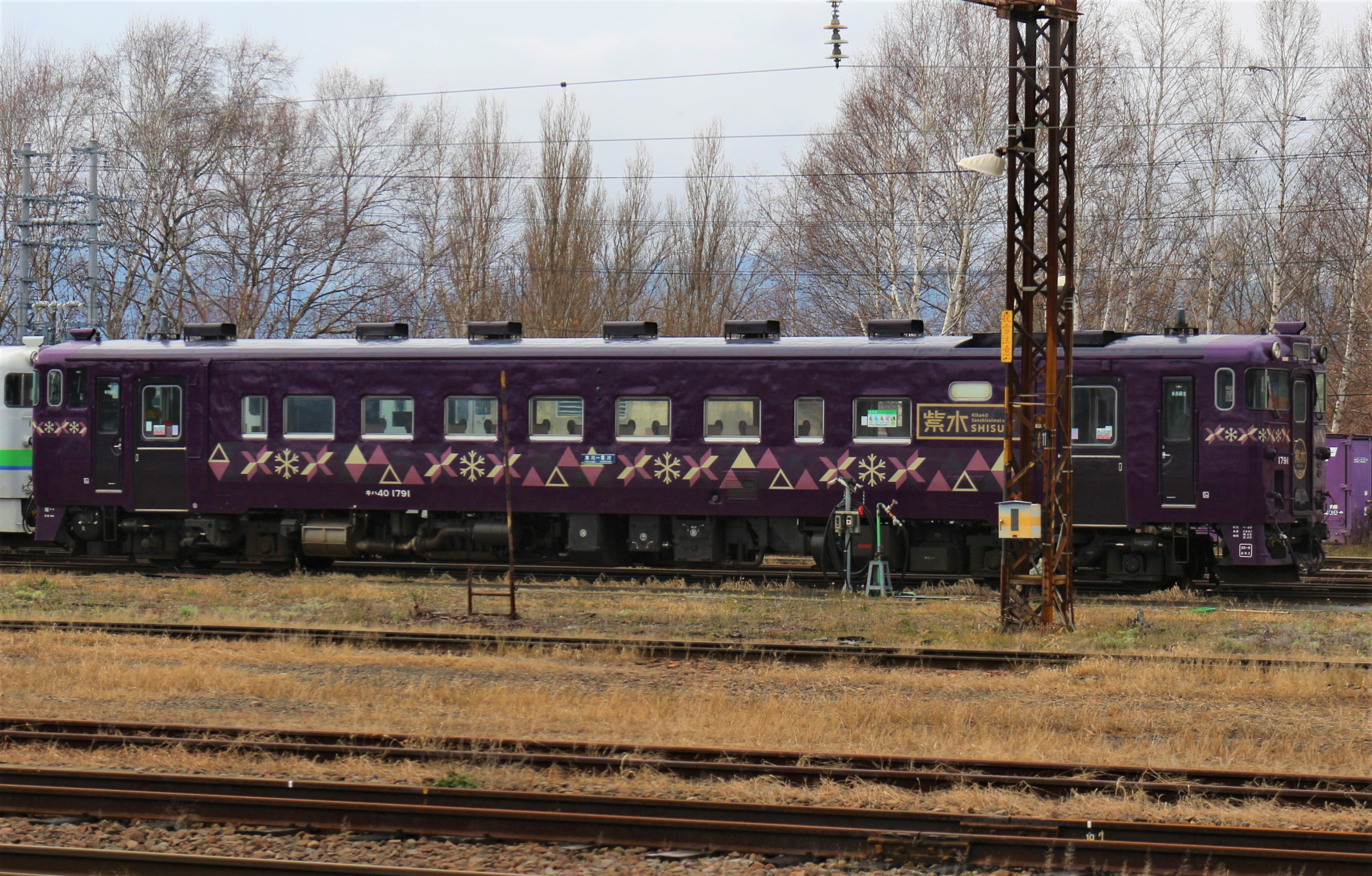
Shisui, 2021

==== Loco hauled ====
Name	Japanese	Classification	No. of cars	Accommodation	Introduced	Converted from	Depot/region	Remarks
Furano Biei Norokko	富良野・美瑛・ノロッコ	510 Series	3	Seating	1998	50 Series	Furano	Ends in 2026
Kushiro Shitsugen Norokko	くしろ湿原ノロッコ号	510 Series	4	Seating	1989	50 Series	Kushiro	Ends in 2026. Has a dedicated DE10 Class locomotive.
SL Fuyu-no-Shitsugen	SL冬の湿原	?	5	Seating	8 January 2000	14 Series, SuHa 43	Kushiro	Only runs in January and February every year. Equipped with a grill that passengers could use to grill seafood.

=== JR East ===
==== EMU ====
Name	Japanese	Classification	No. of cars	Accommodation	Introduced	Converted from	Depot/region	Remarks
Nagomi	和	E655 series	5	Seating	July 2007	Purpose-built	Tokyo	Also used as the train of the Emperor of Japan
The Royal Express	ザ・ロイヤルエクスプレス	Izukyu 2100 series	8	Seating	July 2017	Izukyu 2100 Series	Izu	Jointly operated by Tokyu Corporation, JR East and Izukyu Corporation
B.B.Base	BOSO BICYCLE BASE	209-2200 series	6	Seating	2018	209 series	Makuhari	

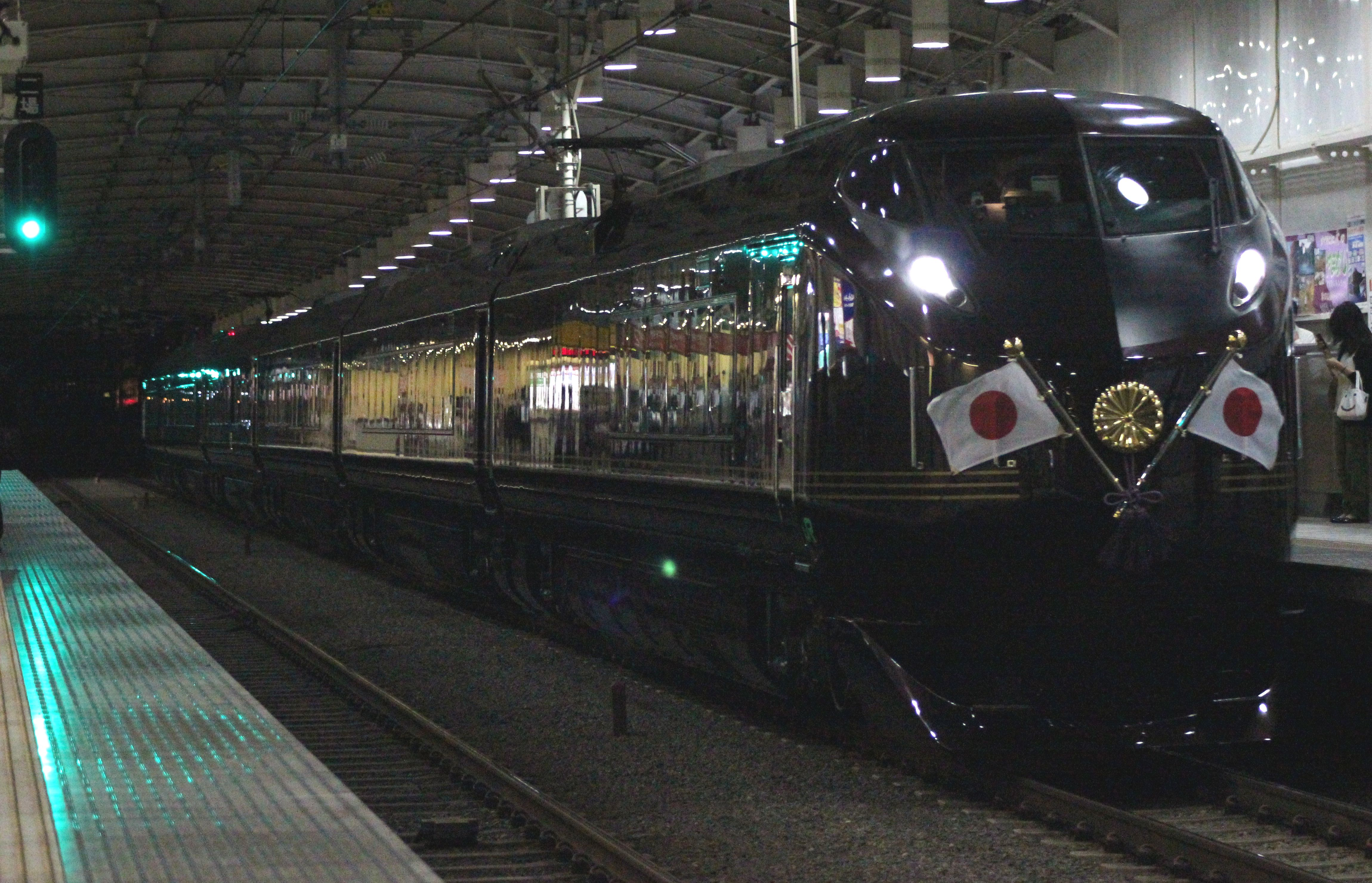
Nagomi on an Imperial Train run, 2012

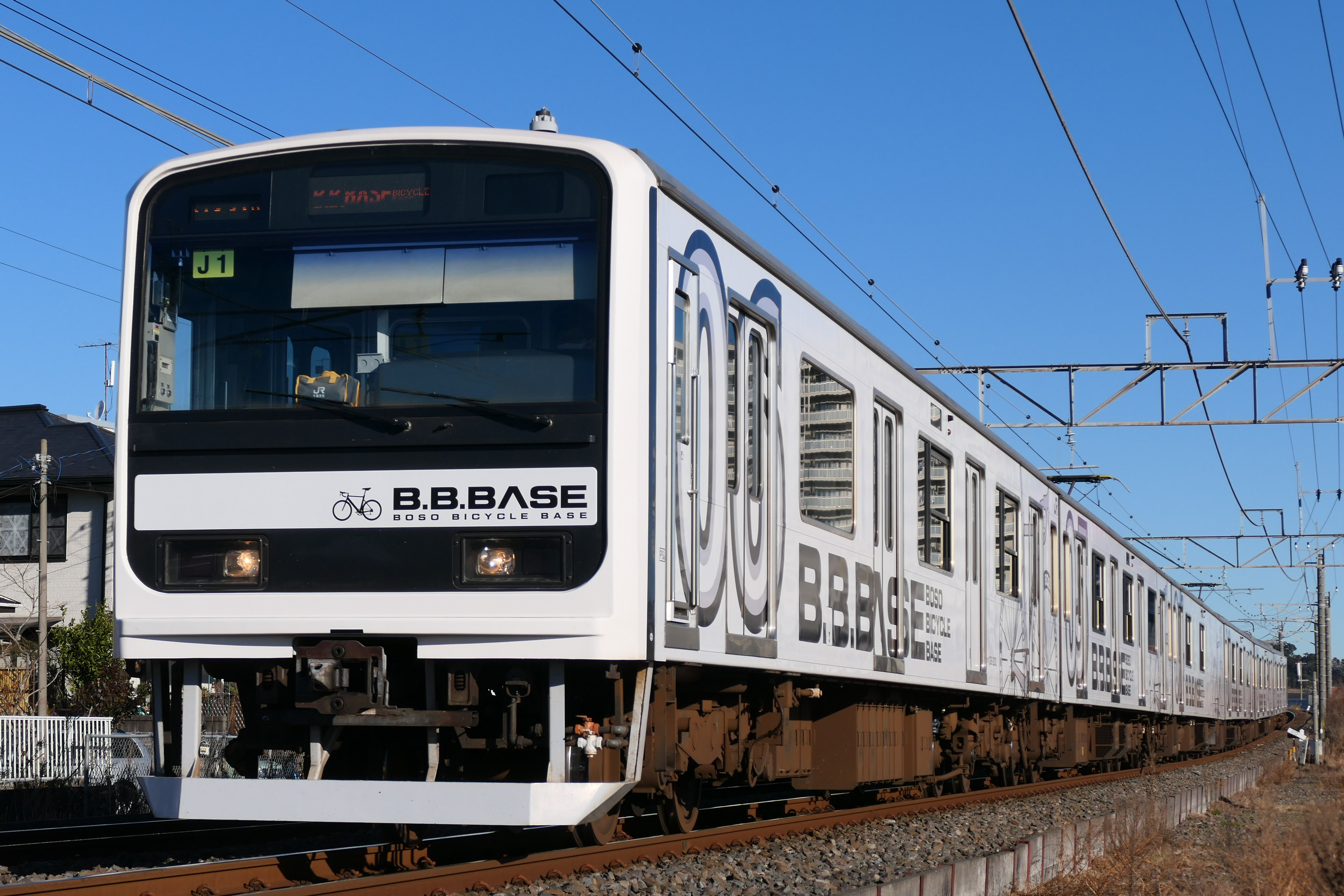
B.B.Base, January 2021

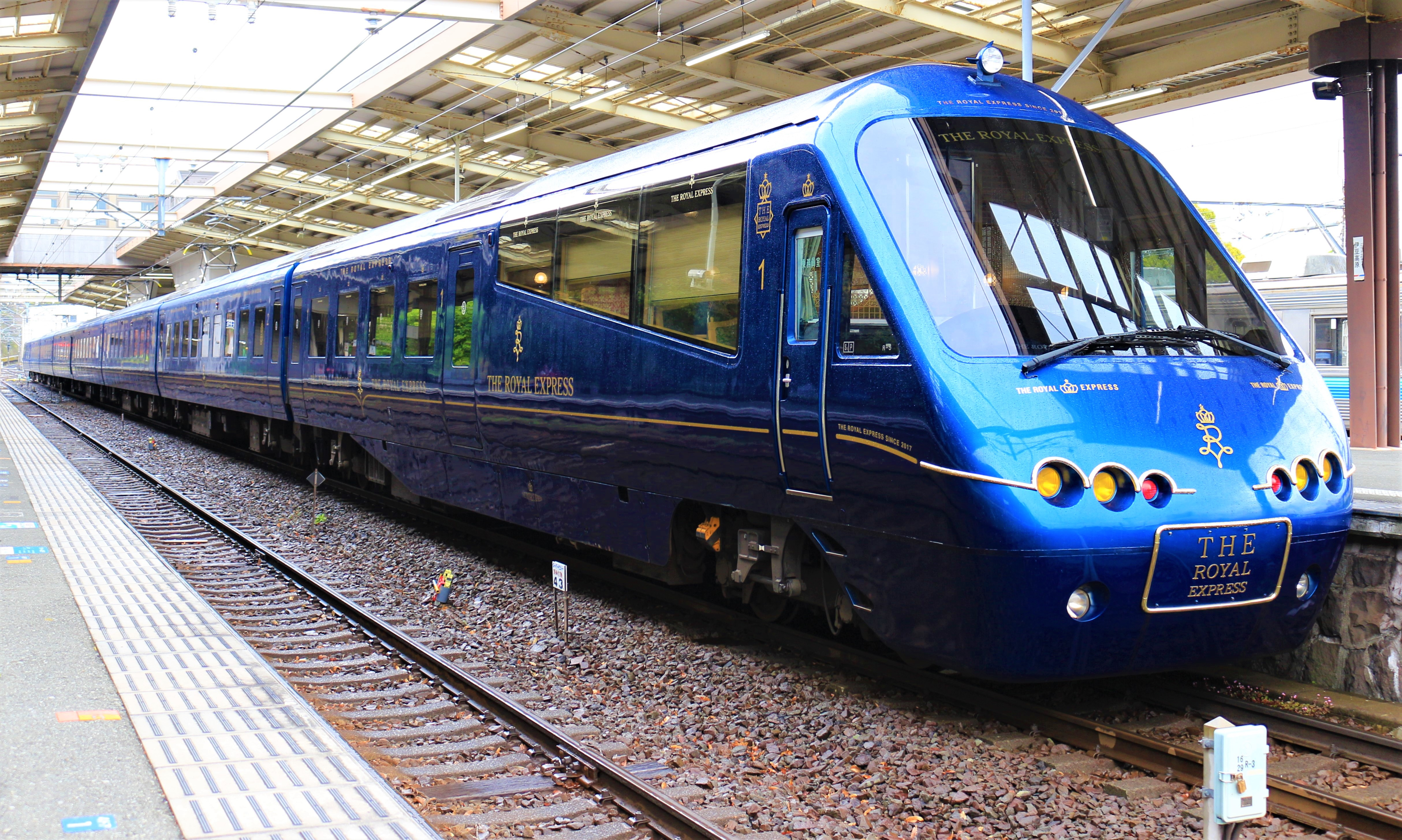
The Royal Express in 2022

==== DMU ====
Name	Japanese	Classification	No. of cars	Accommodation	Introduced	Converted from	Depot/region	Remarks
Koshino Shu*Kura	越乃Shu*Kura	KiHa 40/48	3	Seating	2014	KiHa 40/48 series	Niitsu	
Oykot	おいこっと	KiHa 110 series	2	Seating	2015	KiHa 110 series	Nagano	The name "Oykot" comes from a letter reversal of "Tokyo", intending to create a sense of rural Japan, opposite to Tokyo.
POKÉMON with YOU Train	POKÉMON with YOU Train	KiHa 100	2	Seating	2012	KiHa 100	Ichinoseki	
Resort Shirakami "Aoike"	リゾートしらかみ「青池」	HB-E300	4	Seating/semi-open compartments	2010	Purpose-built	Akita	Replaced KiHa 48 series.
Resort Shirakami "Buna"	リゾートしらかみ「橅」	HB-E300	4	Seating/semi-open compartments	2016	Purpose-built	Akita	Replaced KiHa 48 series.
Resort Shirakami "Kumagera"	リゾートしらかみ「くまげら」	KiHa 48	4	Seating/semi-open compartments	April 2006	KiHa 48	Akita	
Resort View Furusato	リゾートビューふるさと	HB-E300	2	Seating	2010	Purpose-built	Nagano	
Tohoku Emotion	TOHOKU EMOTION	KiHa 110-700 series	3	Seating	19 October 2013	KiHa 110 series	Morioka	KiHa 110-701 + KiHa 111-701 + KiKuShi 112-701
High Rail 1375	はいれーる いちさんななご	KiHa 110 series	2	Seating	1 July 2017	KiHa 110 series	Nagano	
View Coaster Kazekko	びゅうコースター風っこ	KiHa 48	2	Seating	June 2000	KiHa 48	Sendai	Side windows are removed, and metal bars were installed with plastic covering.
Kairi	海里	HB-E300 series	4	Seating	2019	Purpose-built	Niigata	Features a different headlight design than the sets used on Resort Shirakami services. Successor to 'Kirakira Uetsu'.
Hinabi	ひなび	HB-E300 series	2	Seating	December 2023	HB-E300 Series	Iwate	Converted from former Resort Asunaro set
Satono	SATONO	HB-E300 series	2	Seating	April 2024	HB-E300 Series	Yamagata	Converted from former Resort Asunaro set

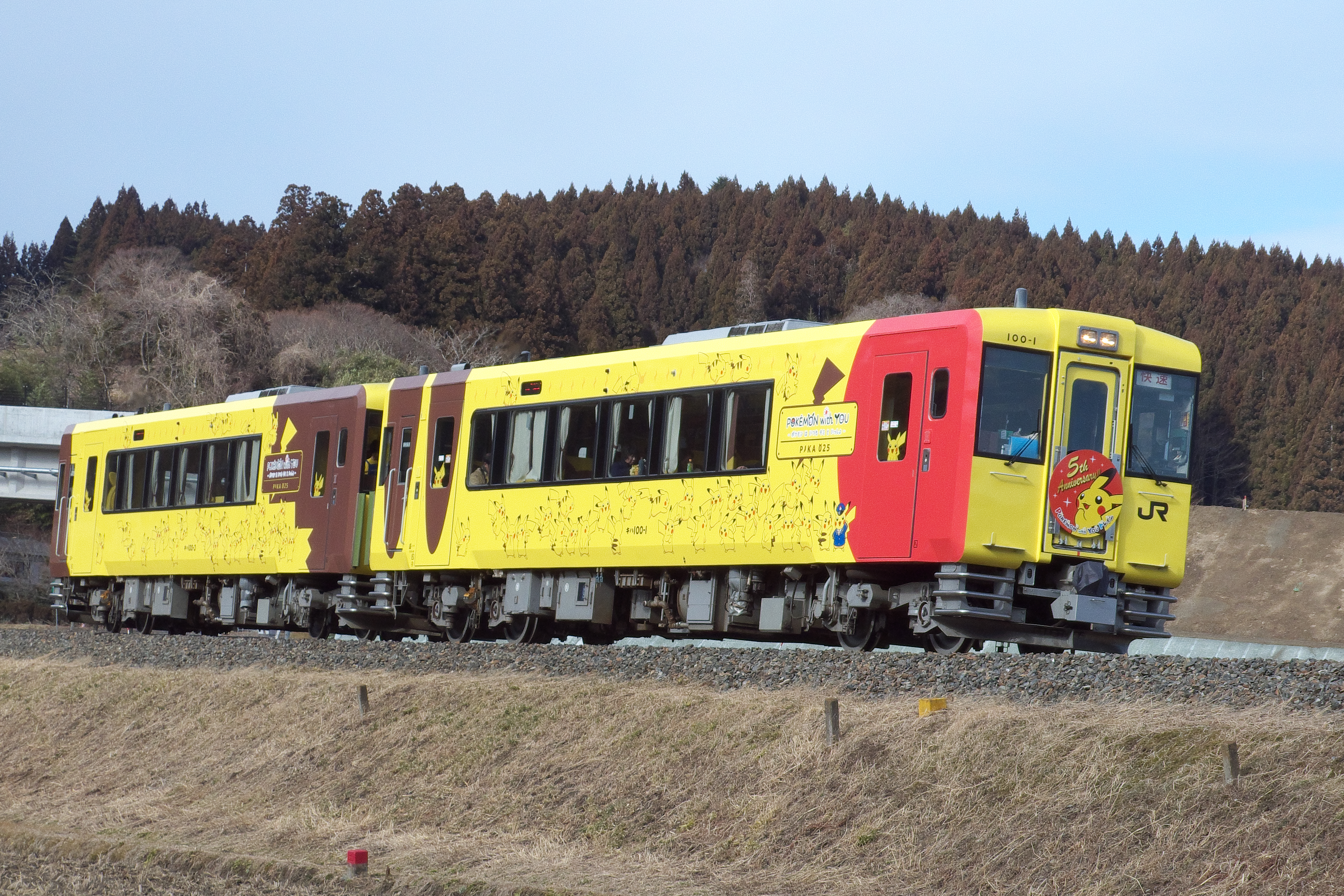
Pokemon With You Train in updated livery, January 2018

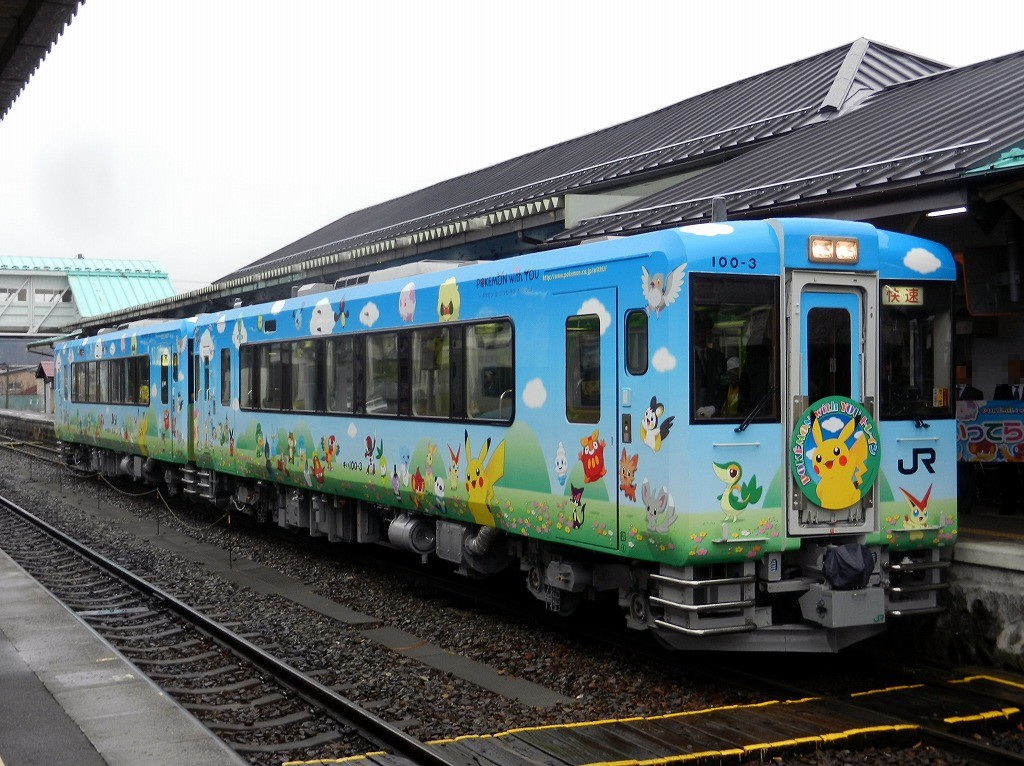
Pokemon With You Train in initial livery, December 2012

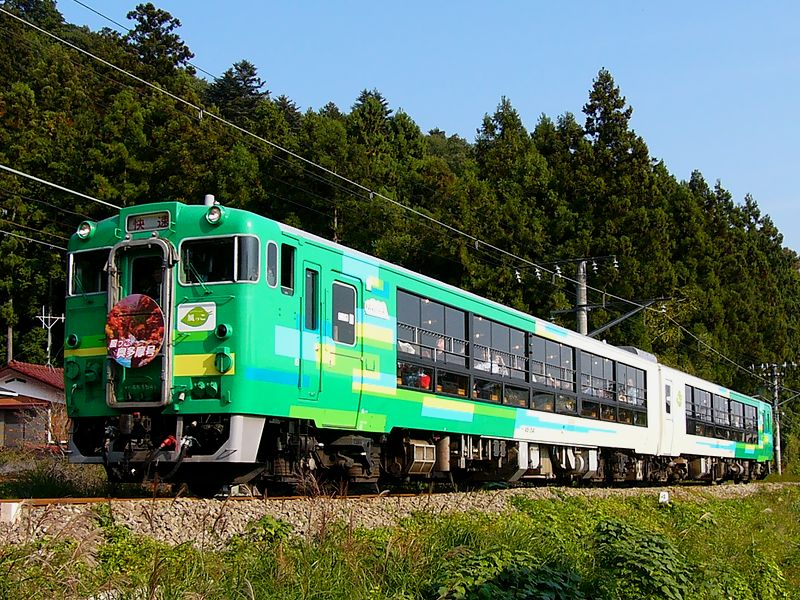
View Coaster Kazekko, November 2005

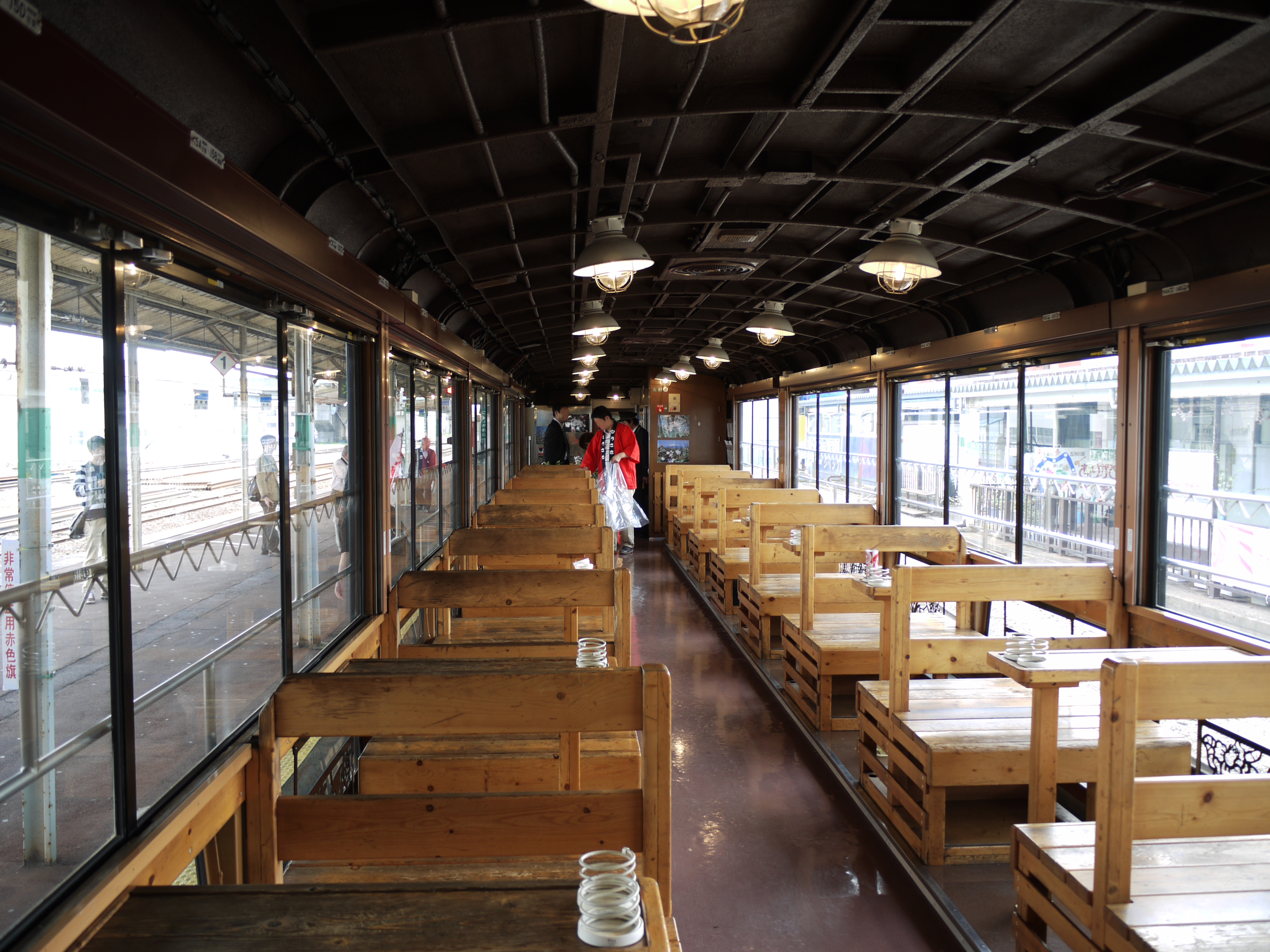
Interior of View Coaster Kazekko

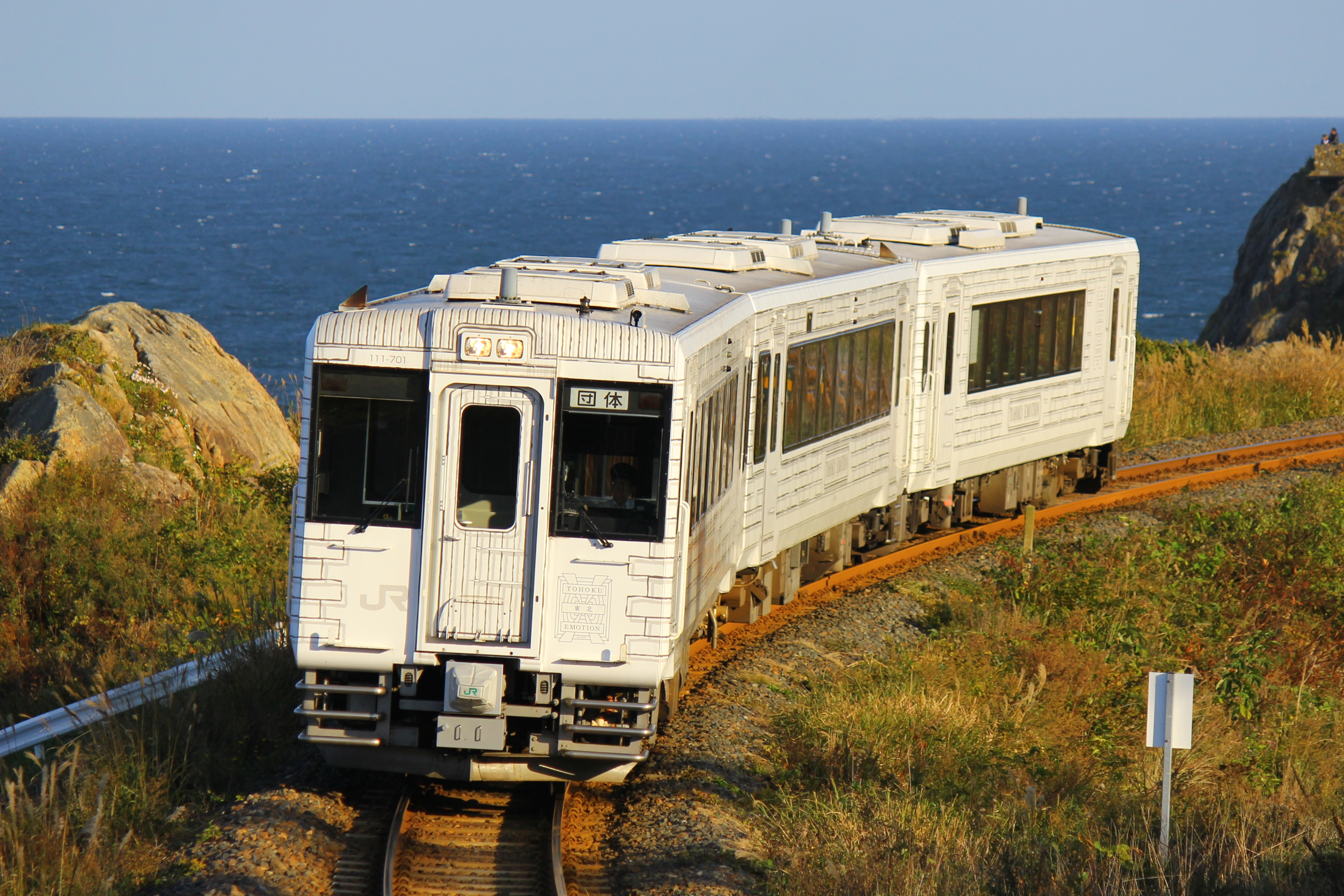
Tohoku Emotion, 2014

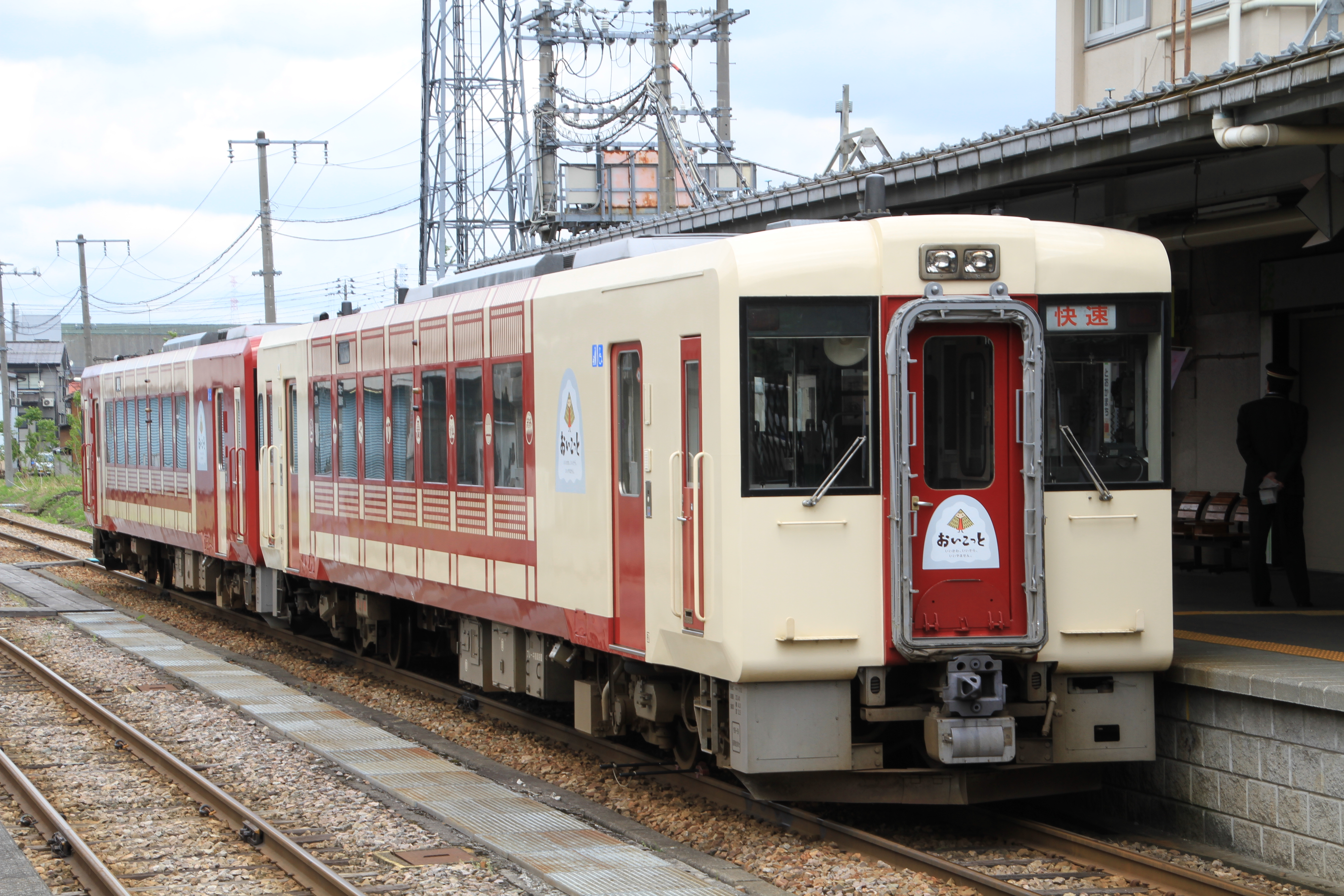
Oykot, 2015

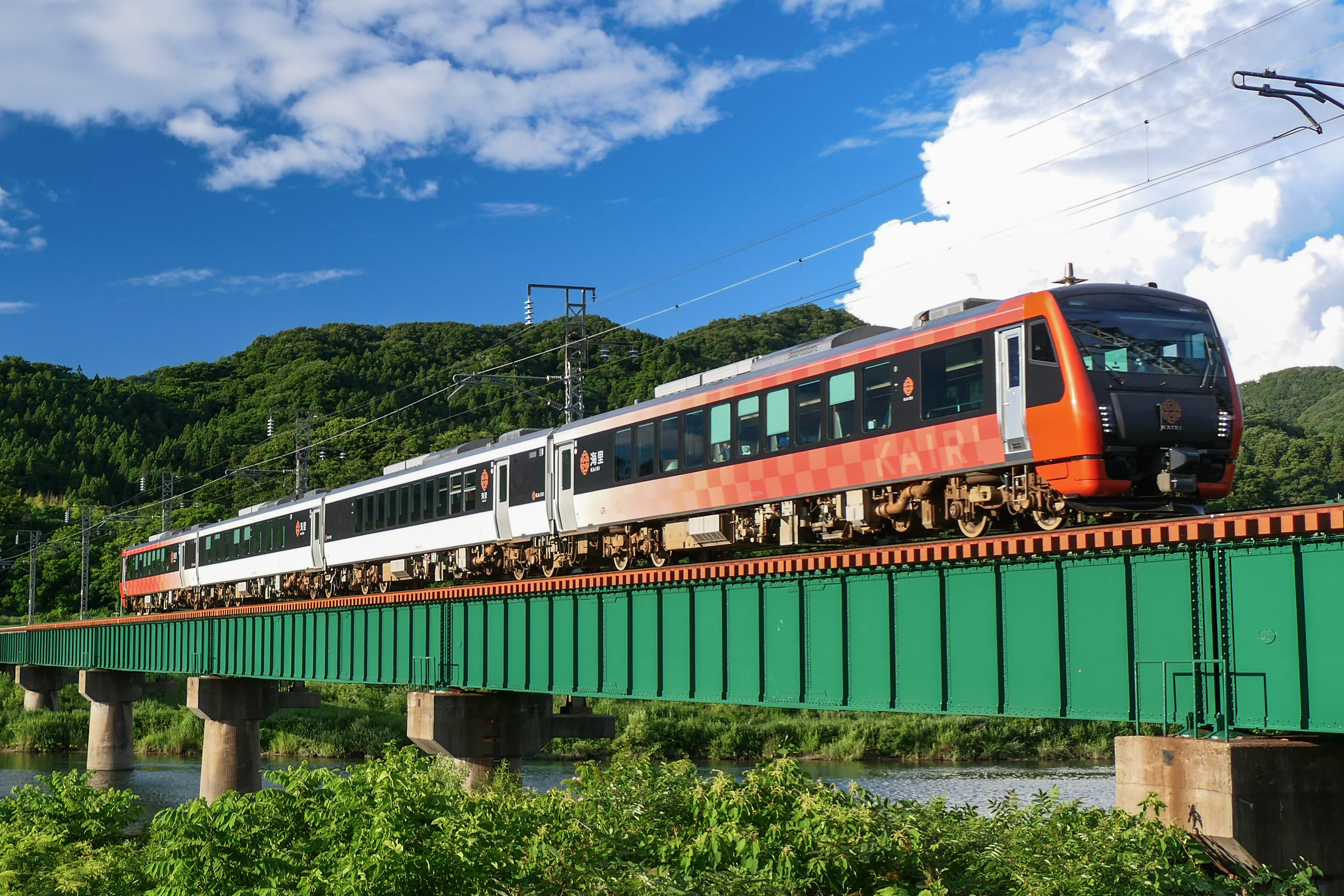
Kairi, July 2022

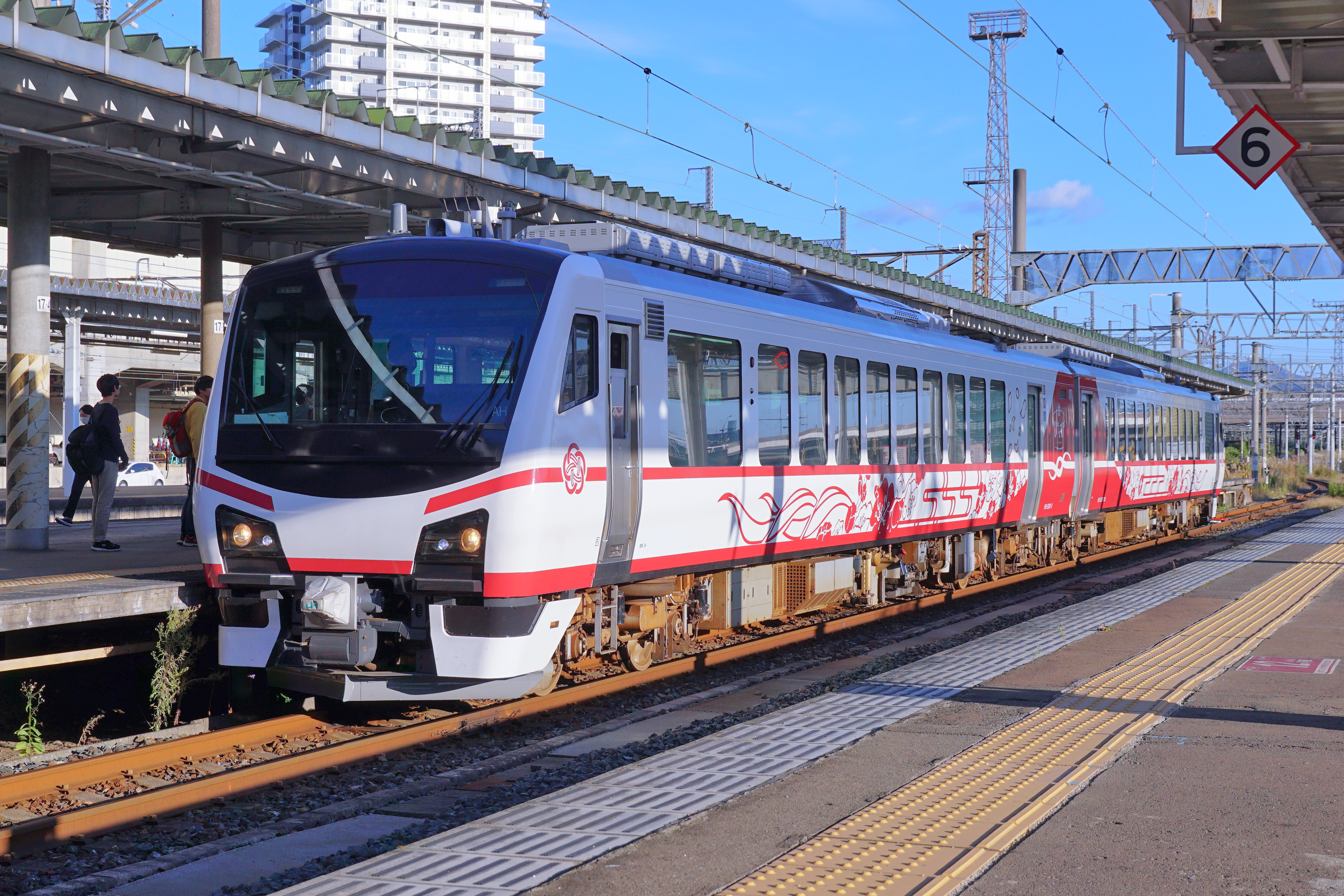
Hinabi, October 2023

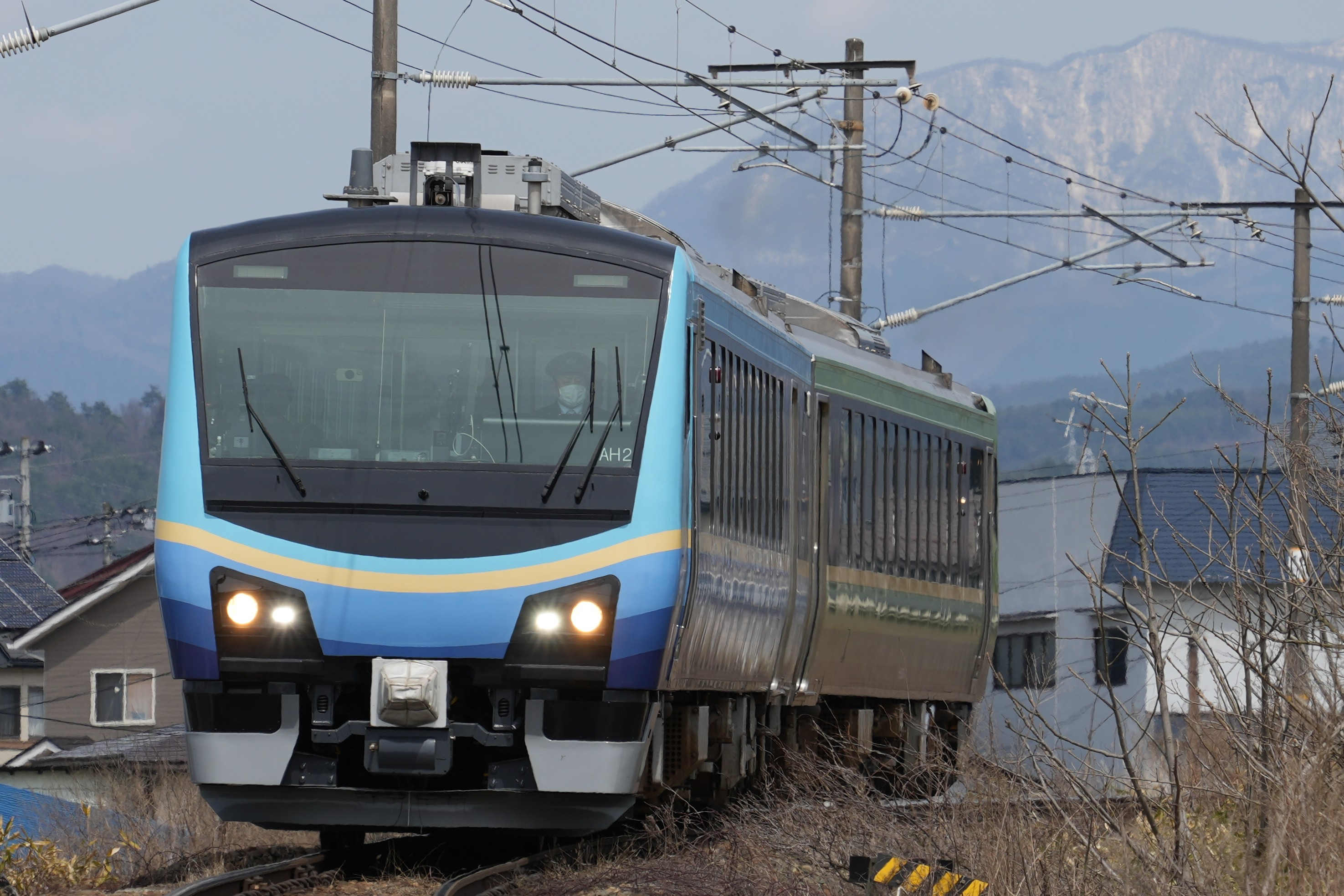
Satono, April 2024

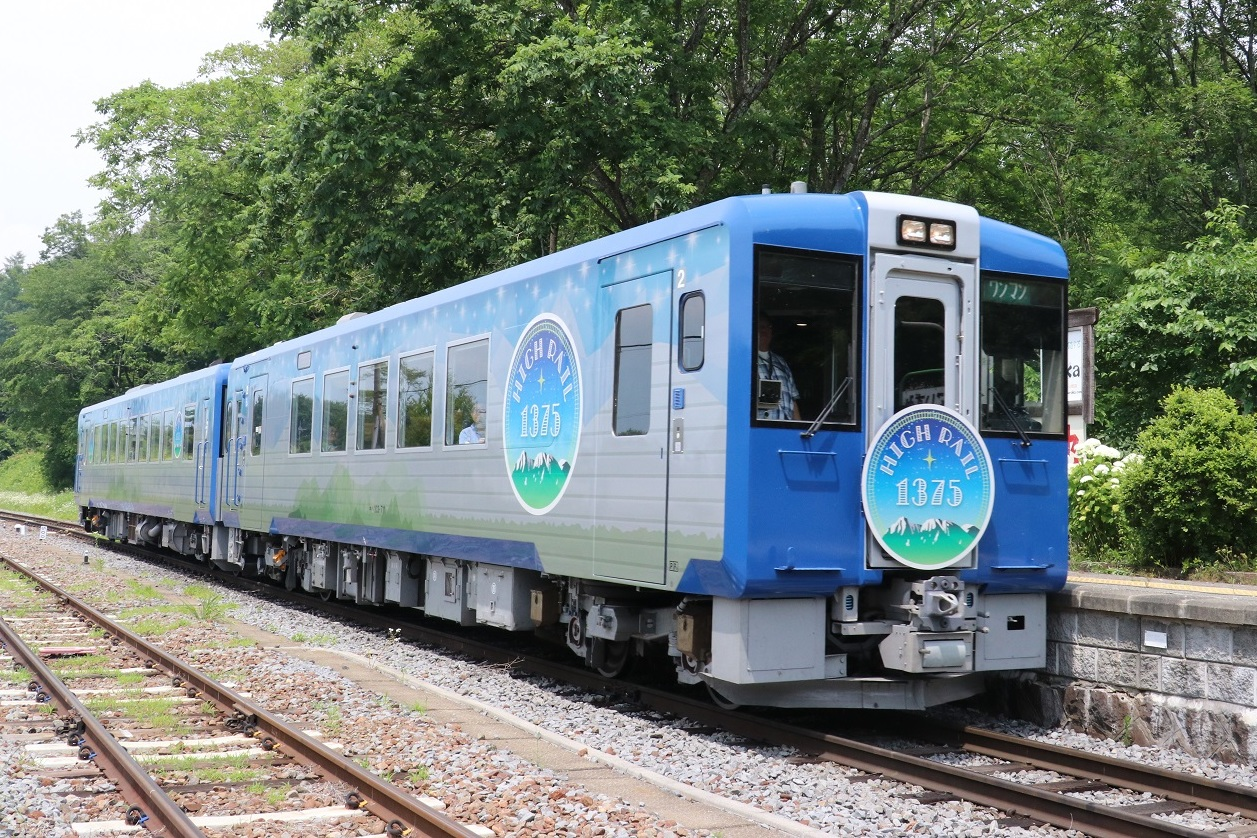
High Rail 1375, July 2017

==== Loco hauled ====
Name	Japanese	Classification	No. of cars	Accommodation	Introduced	Converted from	Depot/region	Remarks
SL Banetsu Monogatari	SLばんえつ物語	12 series	7	Seating	29 April 1999	12	Niigata	
SL Gunma	SLぐんま	12 series	7	Seating	?	12	Gunma	Refurbished in April 2020.

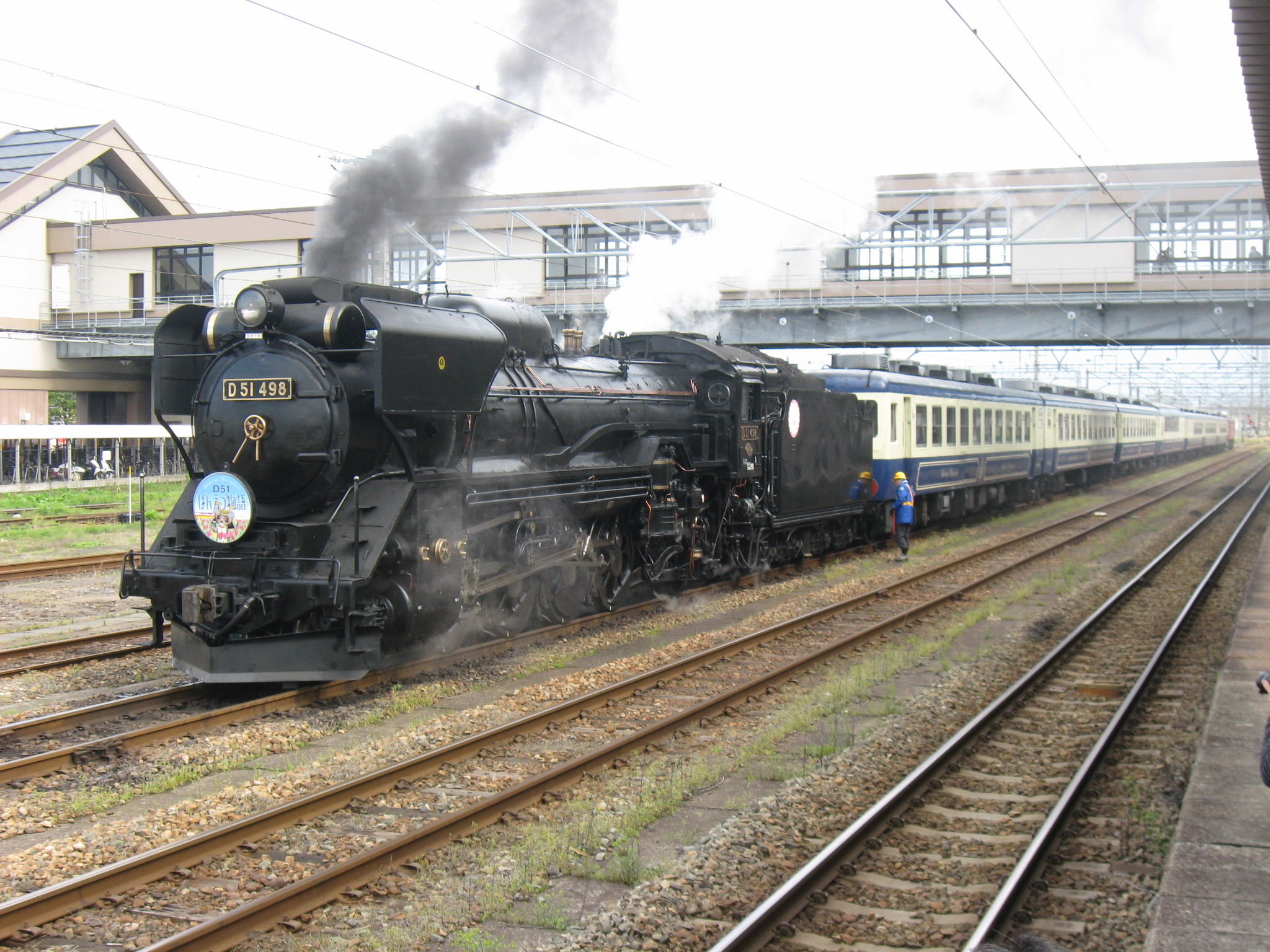
The Banetsu Monogatari trainset hauled by D51 498, April 2011

=== JR West ===
==== EMU ====
Name	Japanese	Classification	No. of cars	Accommodation	Introduced	Converted from	Depot/region	Remarks
La Malle de Bois	La Malle de Bois	213 series	2	Seating	Spring 2016	213 series	Okayama	
WEST EXPRESS Ginga	WEST EXPRESS 銀河	117 series	6	Seating/compartments/Sleeping car	May 2020	117 series	Kyoto	

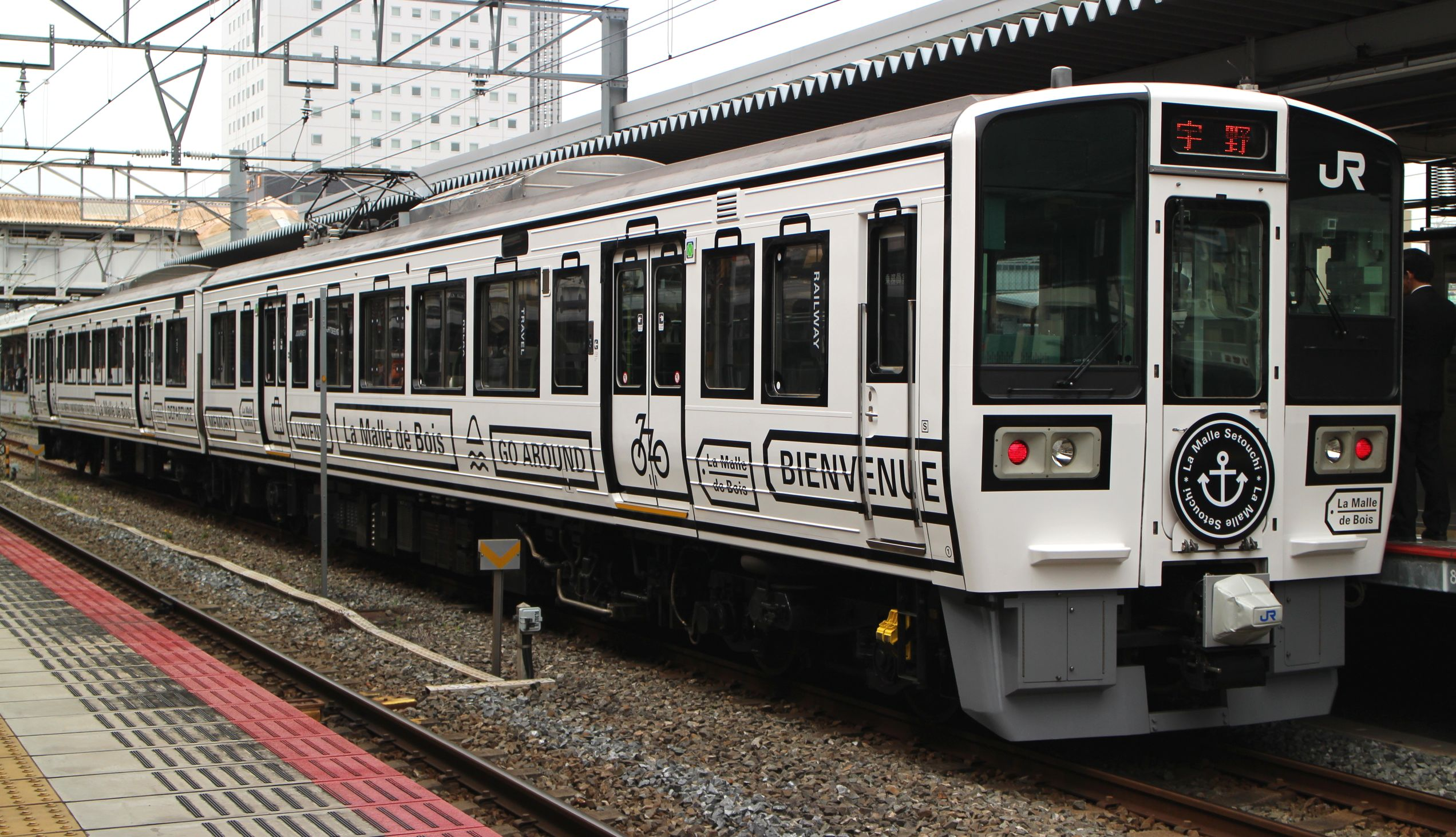
La Malle de Bois 213-7000 series operating the La Malle Setouchi service, Spring 2016

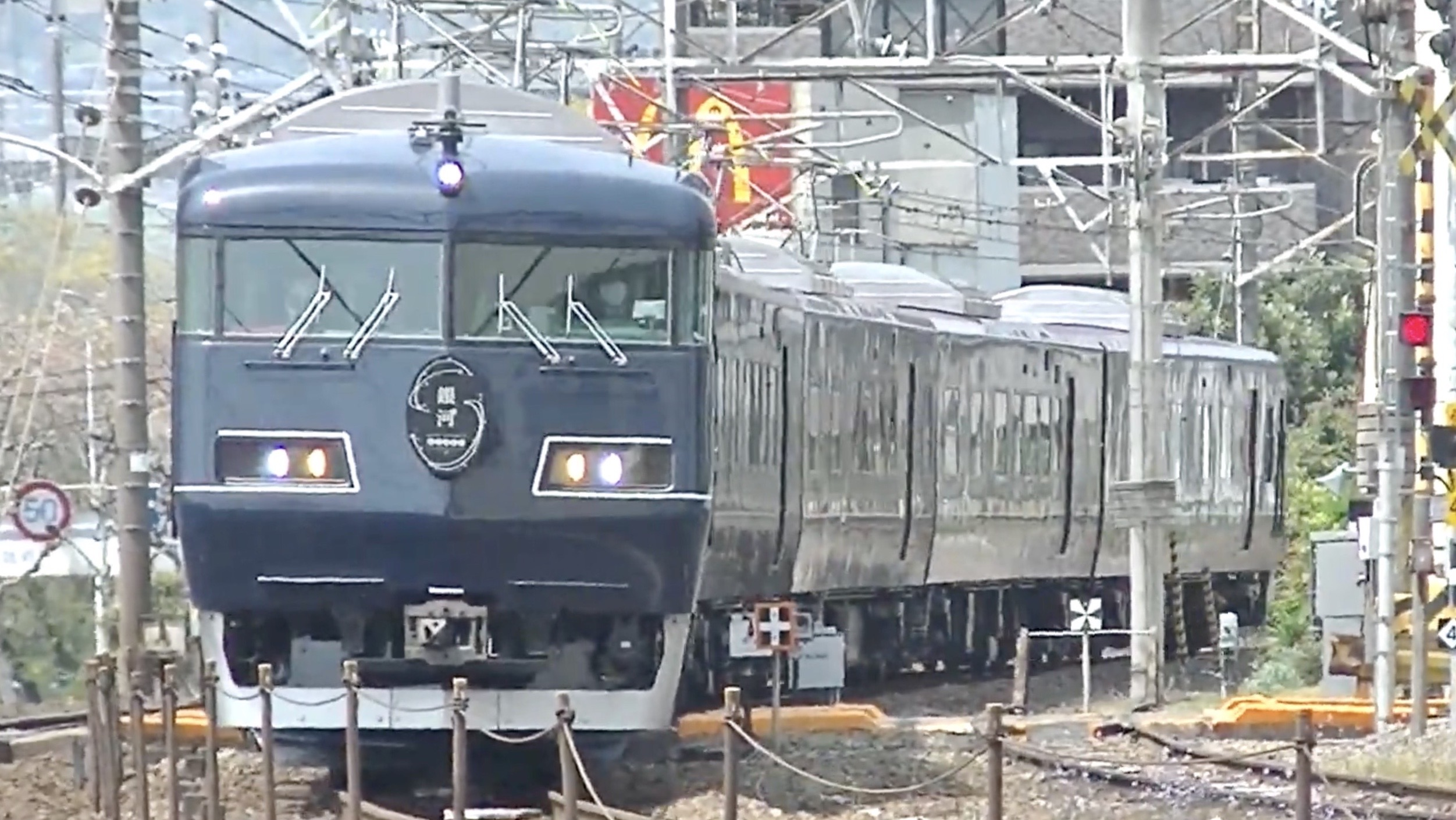
WEST EXPRESS Ginga 117-7000 series, April 2020

==== DMU ====
Name	Japanese	Classification	No. of cars	Accommodation	Introduced	Converted from	Depot/region	Remarks
Belles Montagnes et Mer	ベル・モンターニュ・エ・メール ("べるもんた")	KiHa 40	1	Seating	October 2015	KiHa 40	Toyama	Affectionally referred to as "Belmonta" (べるもんた).
Hanayome Noren	花嫁のれん	KiHa 48	2	Seating	October 2015	KiHa 48	Ishikawa	
Nostalgie	ノスタルジー	KiHa 47	2	Seating	Spring 2016	KiHa 47	Okayama	Painted in JNR colors.
Maru Maru No Hanashi	○○のはなし	KiHa 47	2	Seating	August 2017	KiHa 47	Yamaguchi	Converted from former Misuzu Shiosai
Ametsuchi	あめつち	KiHa 47	2	Seating	July 2018	KiHa 47	Gotō	
Umiyamamusubi	うみやまむすび	KiHa 40	1	Seating	July 2019	KiHa 40	Hyōgo	Converted from former Tenkū no shiro Takedajōato
etSETOra	エトセトラ	KiHa 47	2	Seating	October 2020	KiHa 47	Hiroshima	Converted from former Setouchi Marine View
SAKUBI SAKURA	SAKU美SAKU楽	KiHa 47	1	Seating	July 2022	KiHa 47	Okayama	

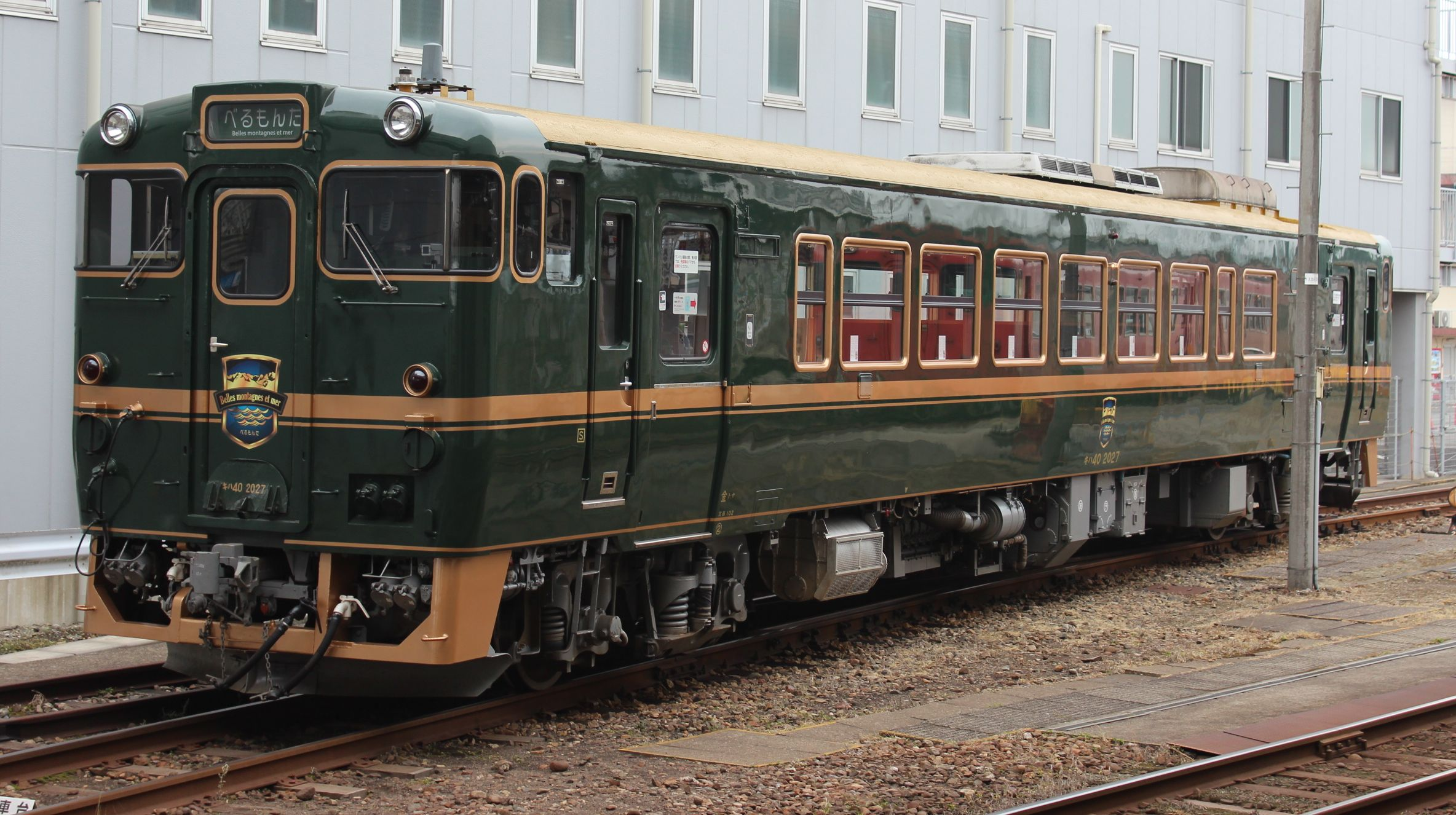
Belles Montagnes el Mer KiHa 40 series, May 2016

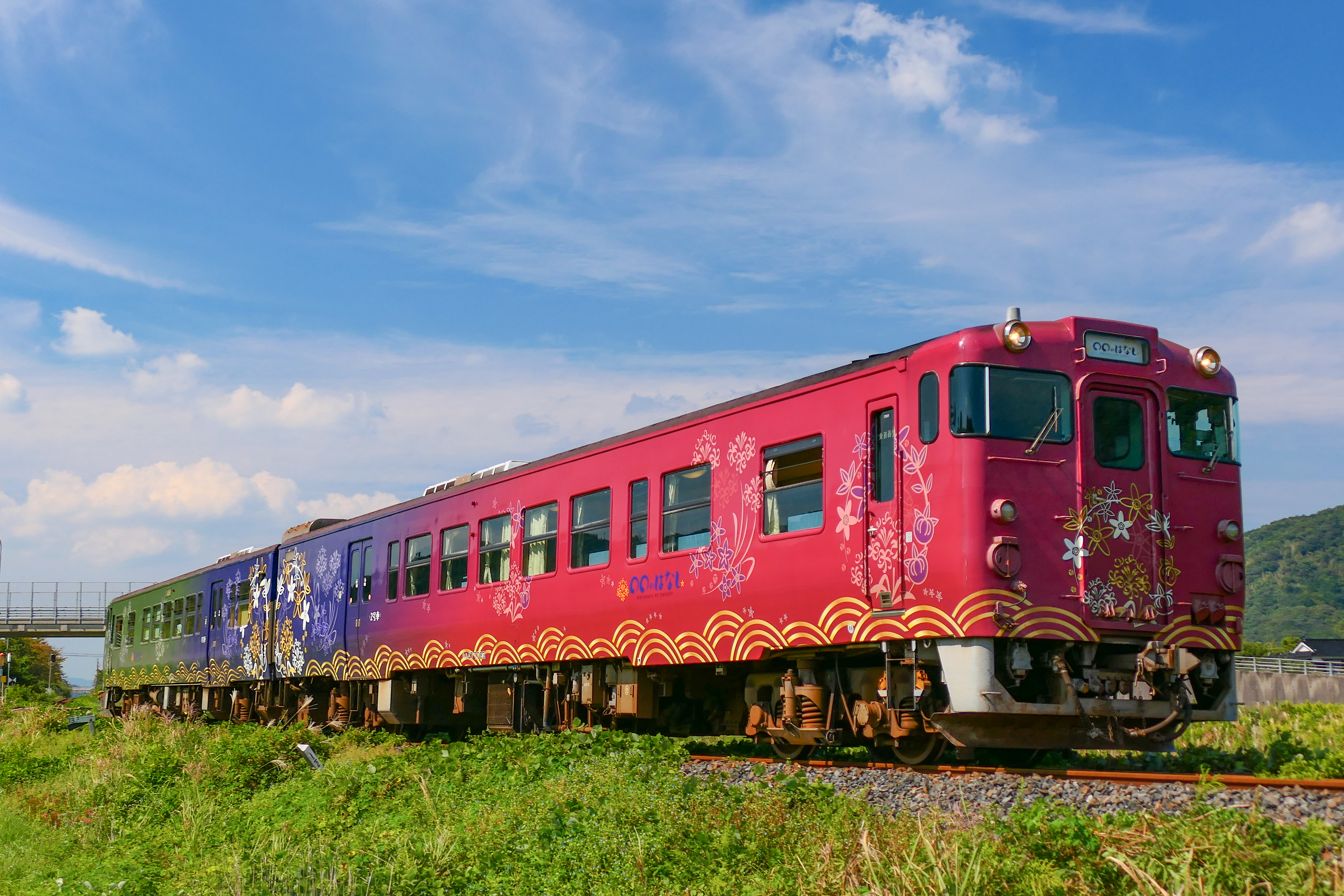
Maru Maru No Hanashi KiHa 40 series, October 2022

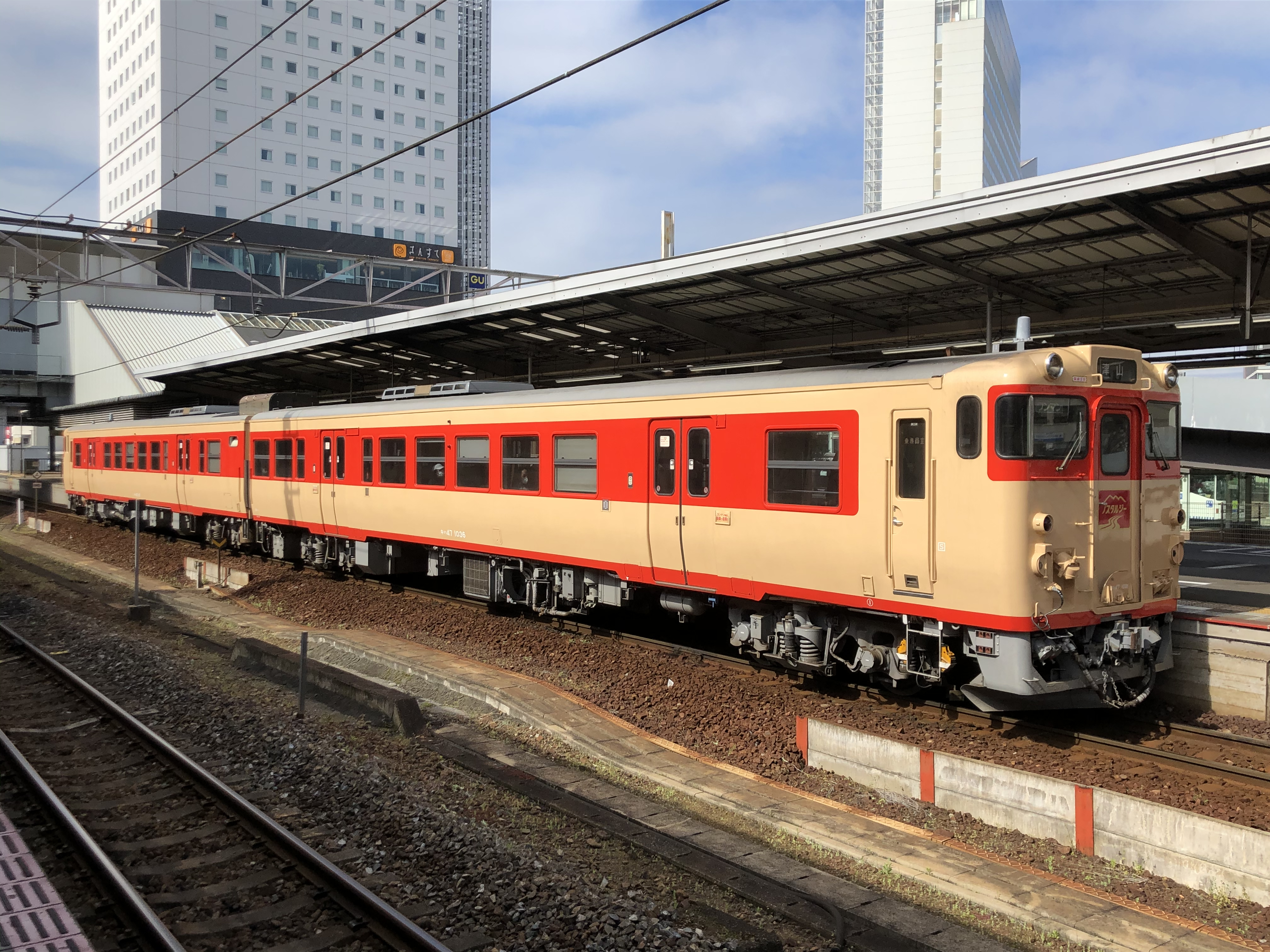
Nostalgie

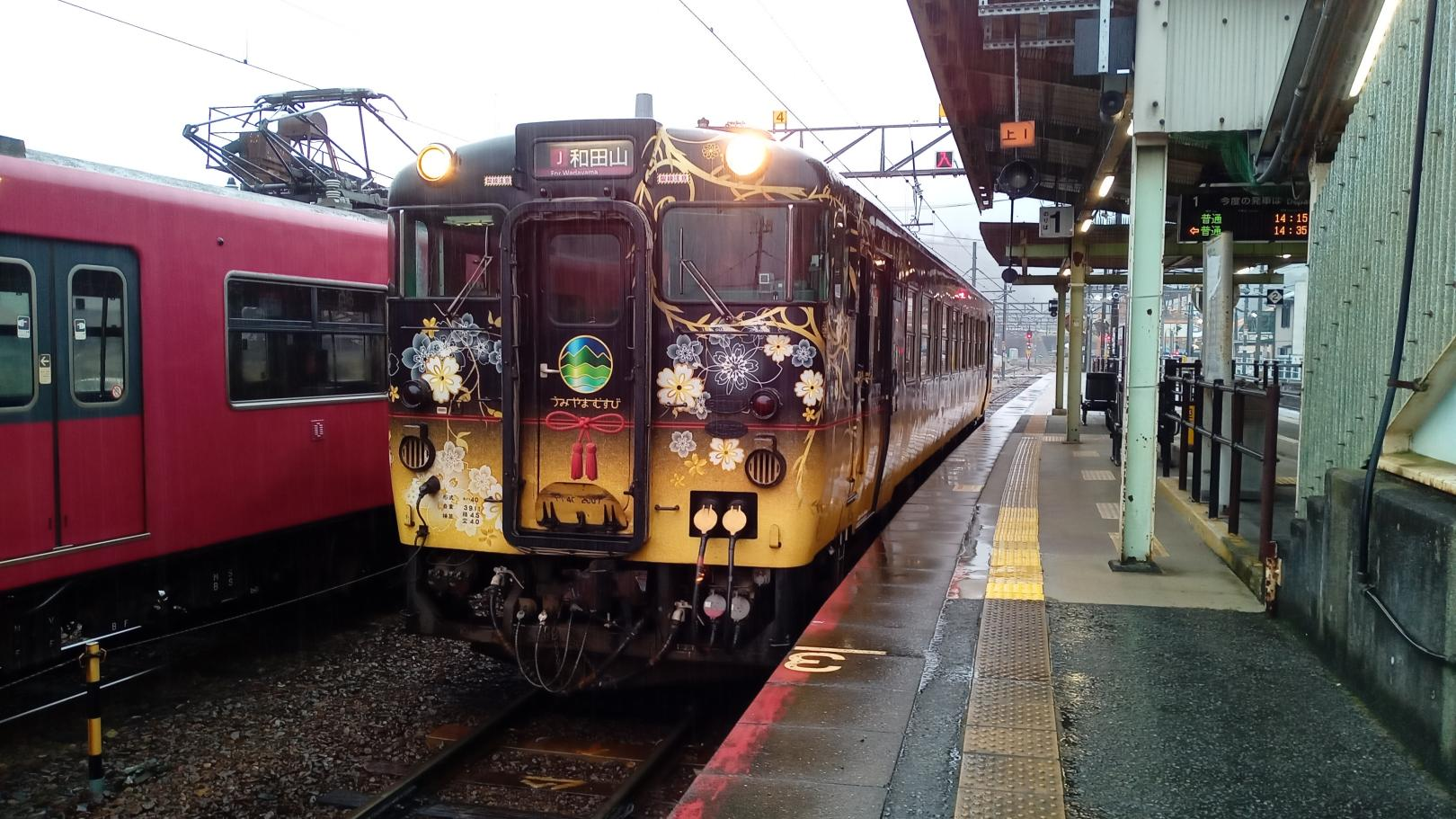
Umiyamamsubi

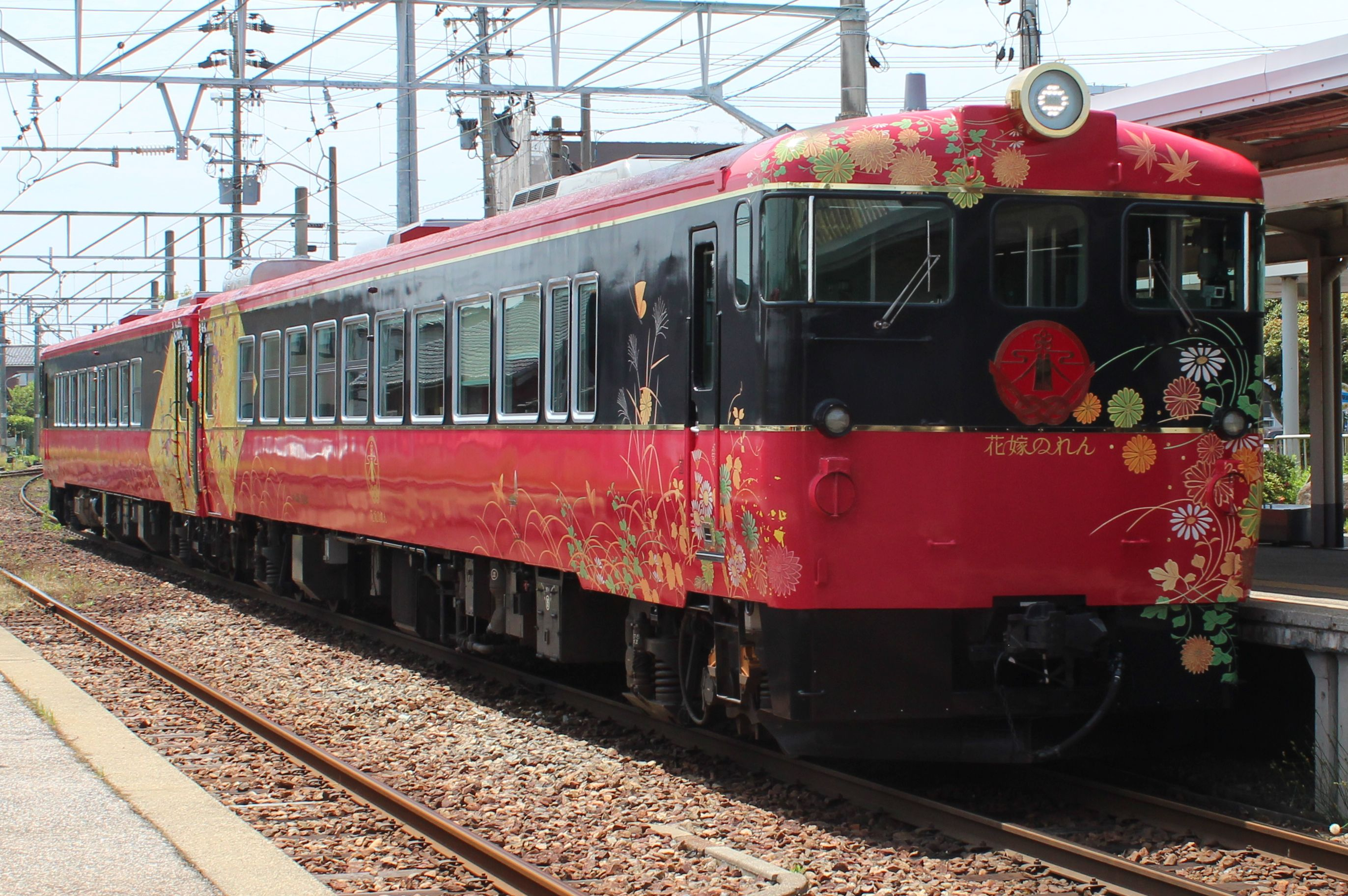
Hanayome Noren, May 2016

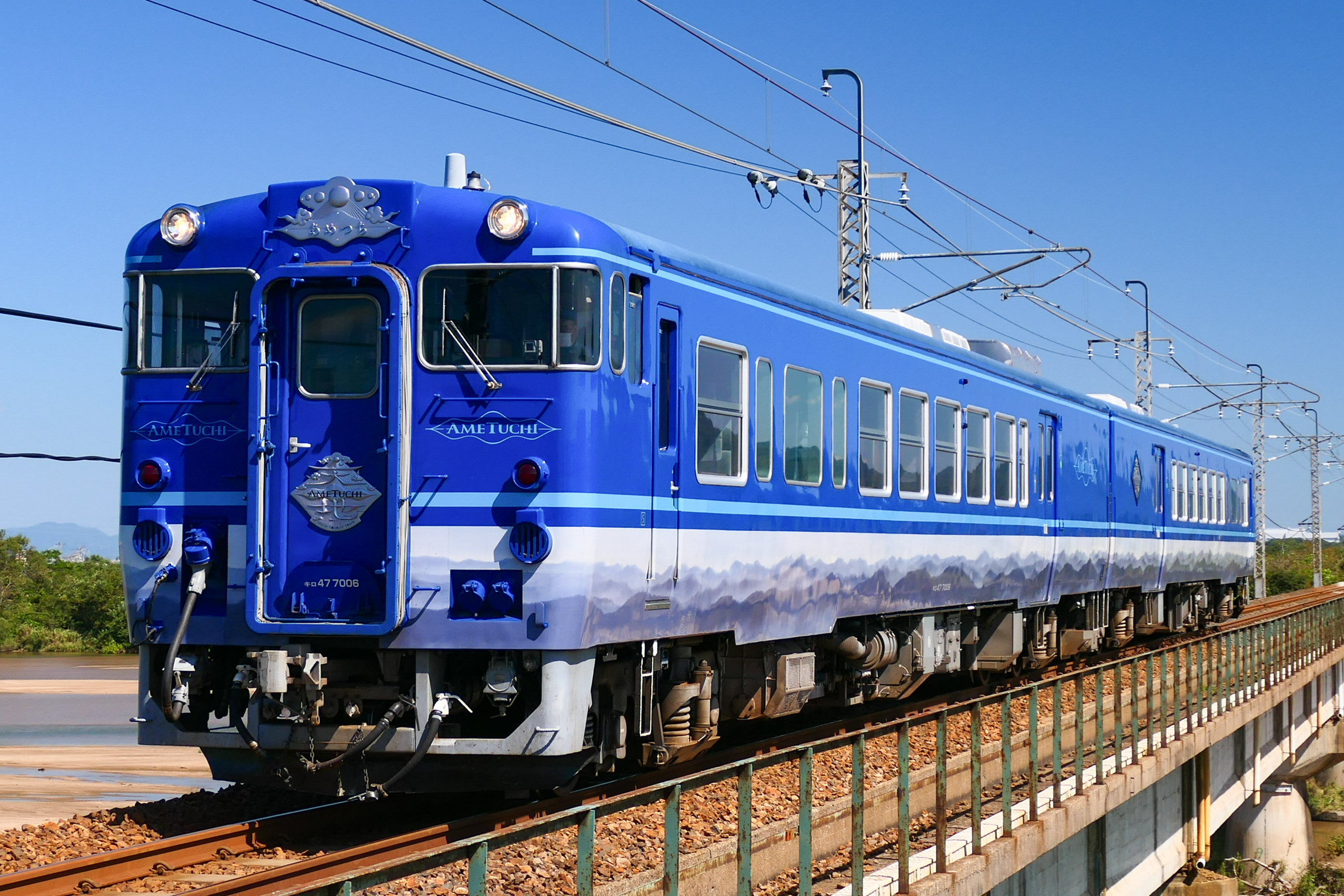
Ametuchi KiHa 47 series, October 2022

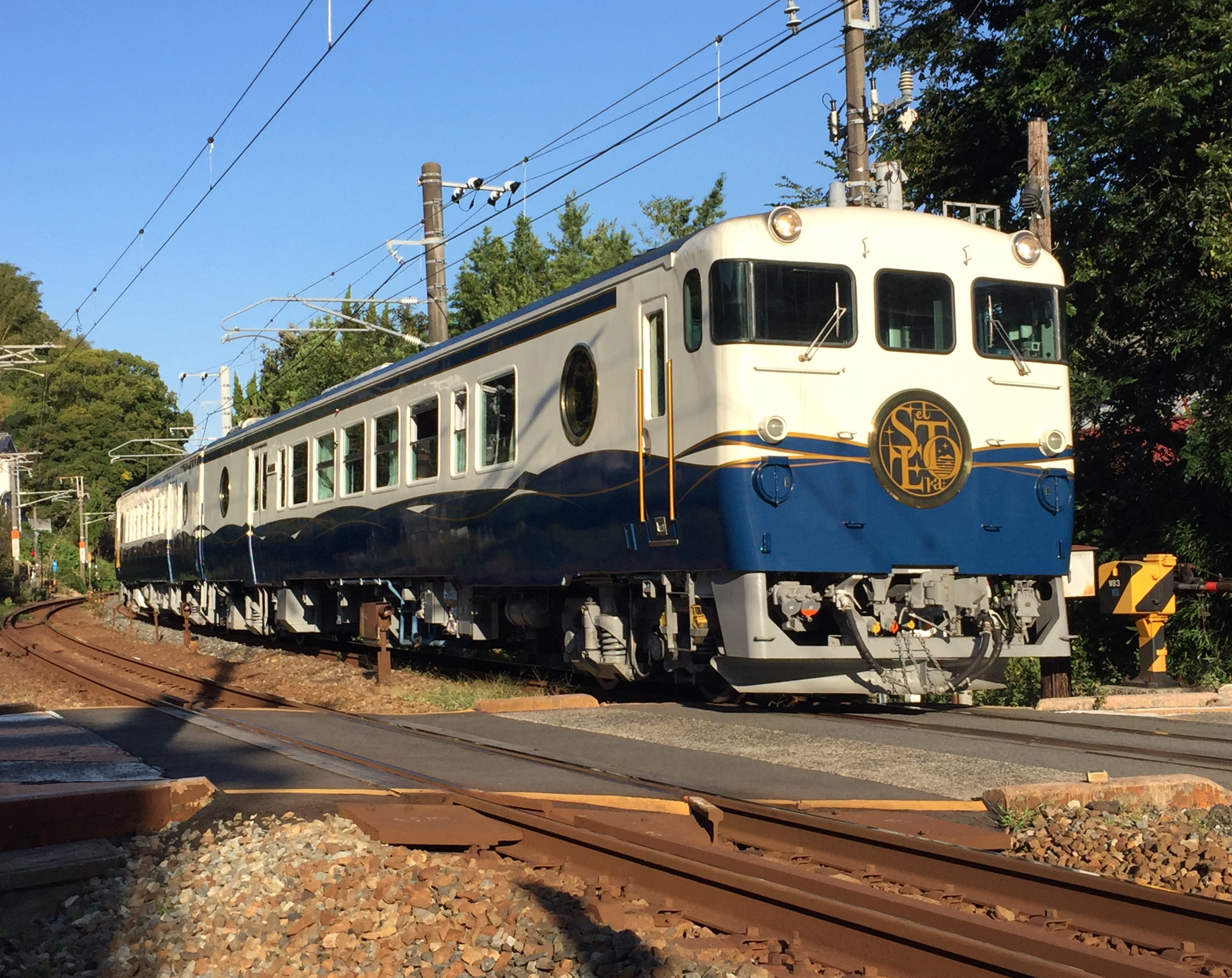
etSETOra

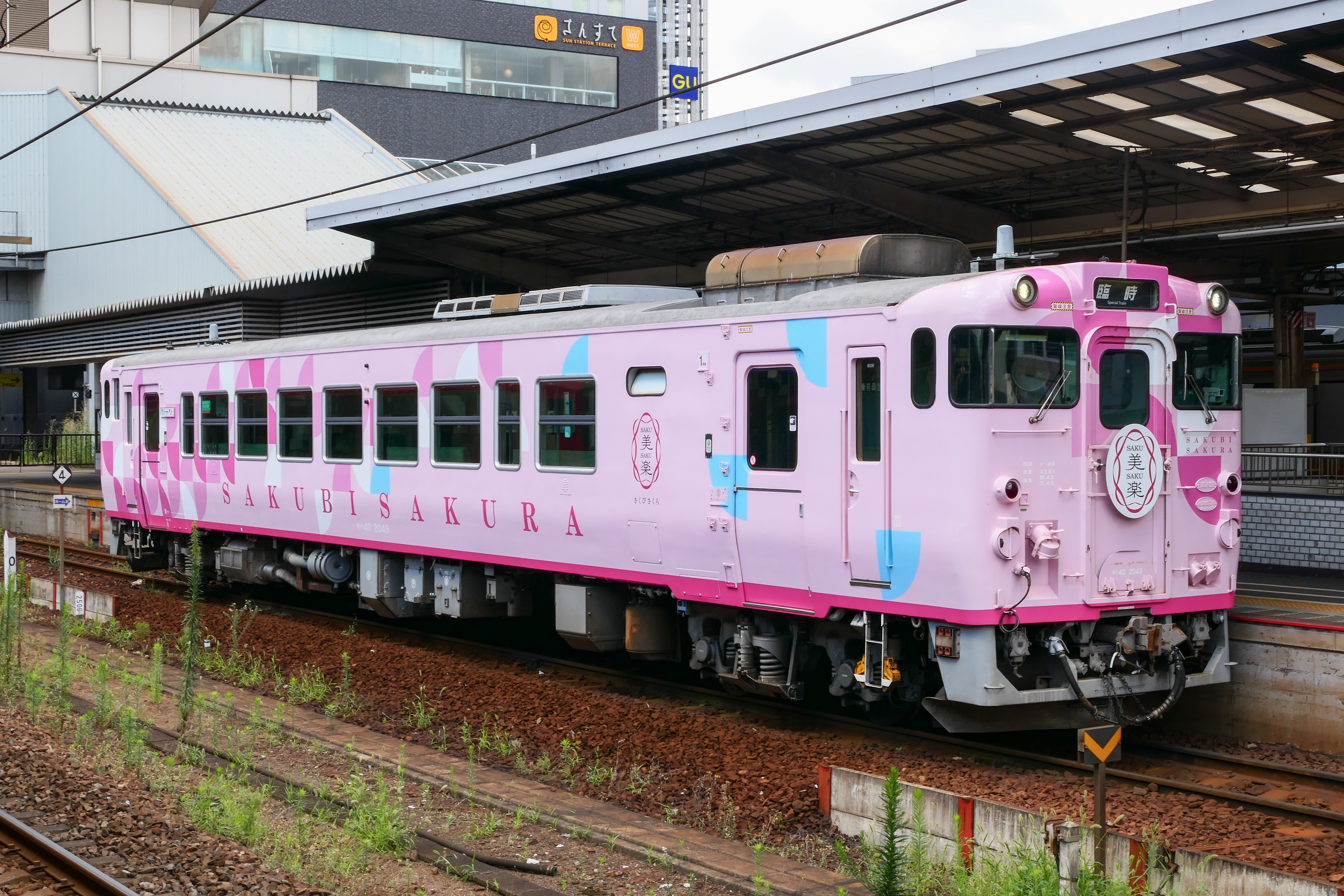
Sakubi Sakura

==== Loco hauled ====
Name	Japanese	Classification	No. of cars	Accommodation	Introduced	Converted from	Depot/region	Remarks
SL Yamaguchi	SLやまぐち号	35 series	5	Seating	September 2017	Purpose-built	Yamaguchi	Replaced 12 series.

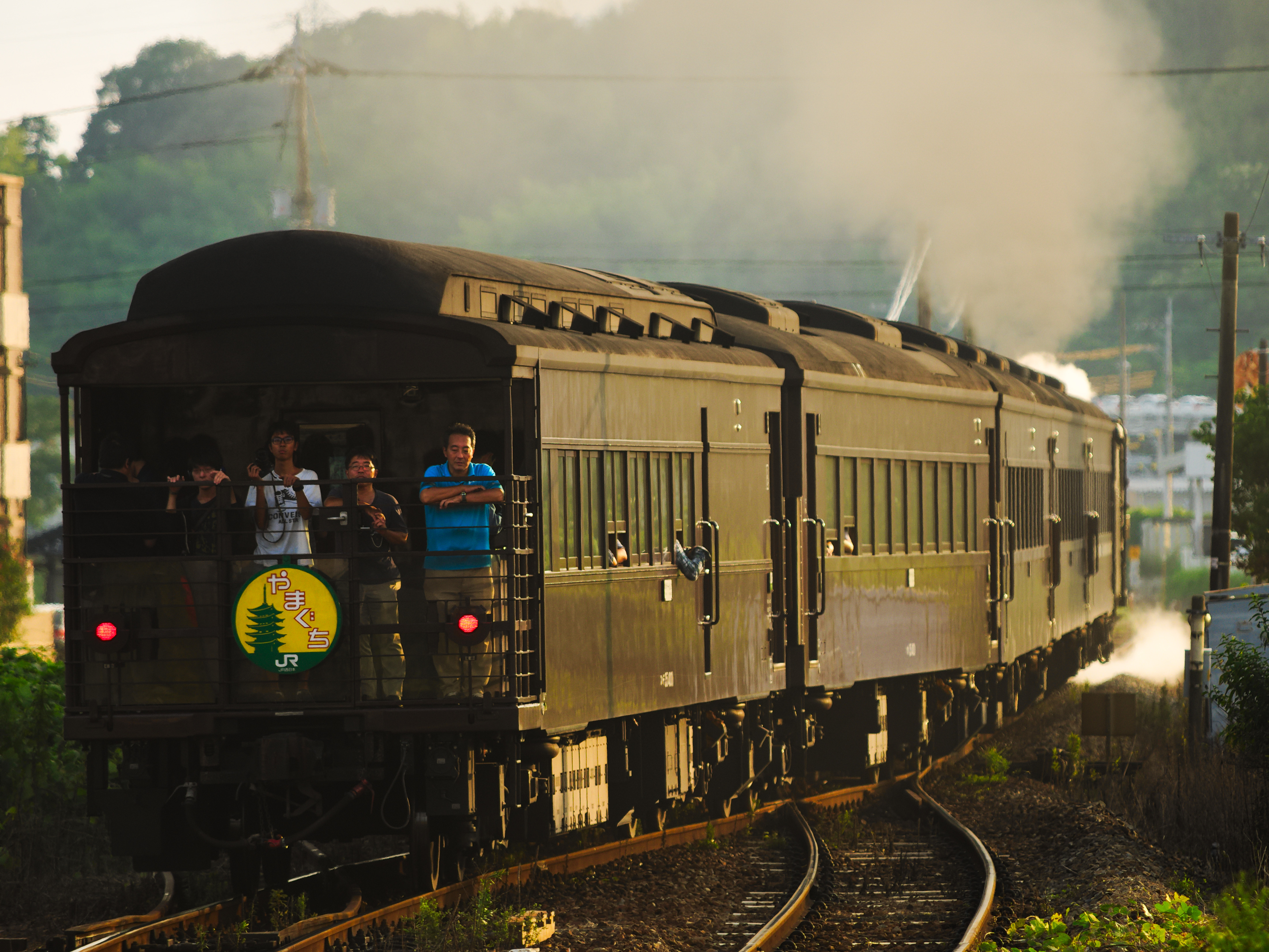
SL Yamaguchi 35-4000 series, September 2017

=== JR Shikoku ===
Sightseeing trains are operated on each line of JR Shikoku. All of these trains are operated by DMUs, and there are no trains operated by electric trains. This is because most of the lines within JR Shikoku's jurisdiction are non-electrified.

==== DMU ====
Name	Japanese	Classification	No. of cars	Accommodation	Introduced	Converted from	Depot/region	Remarks
Shikoku Mannaka Sennen Monogatari	四国まんなか千年ものがたり	KiHa 185 series	3	Seating	April 2017	KiHa 185	Kotohira	All 3 cars have distinct paint schemes.
Iyonada Monogatari (KiHa 185)	伊予灘ものがたり	KiHa 185 series	3	Seating	3 April 2022	KiHa 185	Ehime	Replaced former KiHa 47, which was retired in 2021.
Shikoku Tosa Toki no Yoake no Monogatari	志国土佐 時代の夜明けのものがたり	KiHa 185 series	2	Seating	July 2020	KiHa 185	Kochi	
Kaiyodo Hobby Train	海洋堂ホビートレイン	KiHa 32	1	Seating	July 2011	KiHa 32	Matsuyama	Has had 3 different paint schemes. Part of the Yodosen Fun Fun Trains that run on the Yodo Line.
Tetsudo Hobby Train	鉄道ホビートレイン	KiHa 32	1	Seating	March 2014	KiHa 32	Matsuyama	Outwardly modified to resemble a 0 Series Shinkansen. Part of the Yodosen Fun Fun Trains that run on the Yodo Line.
Shiman Torokko	しまんトロッコ	KiHa 32	2	Seating	2014	KiHa 32	Shimanto	The rear-end car is fully open. Part of the Yodosen Fun Fun Trains that run on the Yodo Line.
Oni Train	鬼列車	KiHa 32	1	Seating	July 2021	KiHa 32	Kihoku	Part of the Yodosen Fun Fun Trains that run on the Yodo Line.
Shimanto Good Luck Train Smile Eki-chan	しまんと開運汽車 すまいるえきちゃん号	KiHa 32	1	Seating	January 29, 2022	KiHa 32	Shimanto	Part of the Yodosen Fun Fun Trains that run on the Yodo Line.
Welcome Nanyo!	おさんぽなんよ号	KiHa 32	1	Seating	February 21, 2016	KiHa 32	Shimanto	Part of the Yodosen Fun Fun Trains that run on the Yodo Line.
Yoshinogawa Torokko	藍よしのがわトロッコ	KiHa 32 & 185	2	Seating	2020	KiHa 32 & 185	Tokushima	

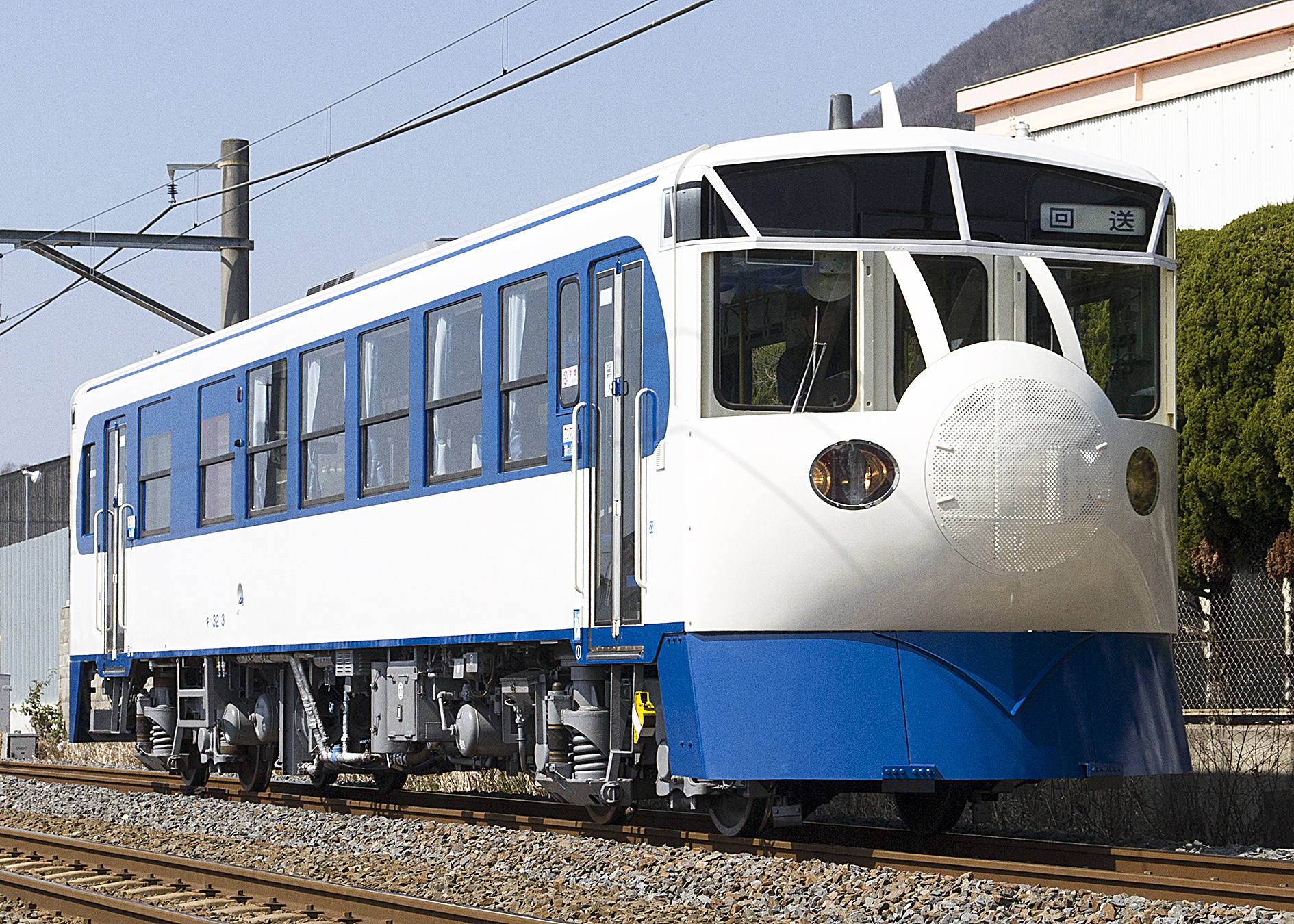
Tetsudo Hobby Train, March 2014

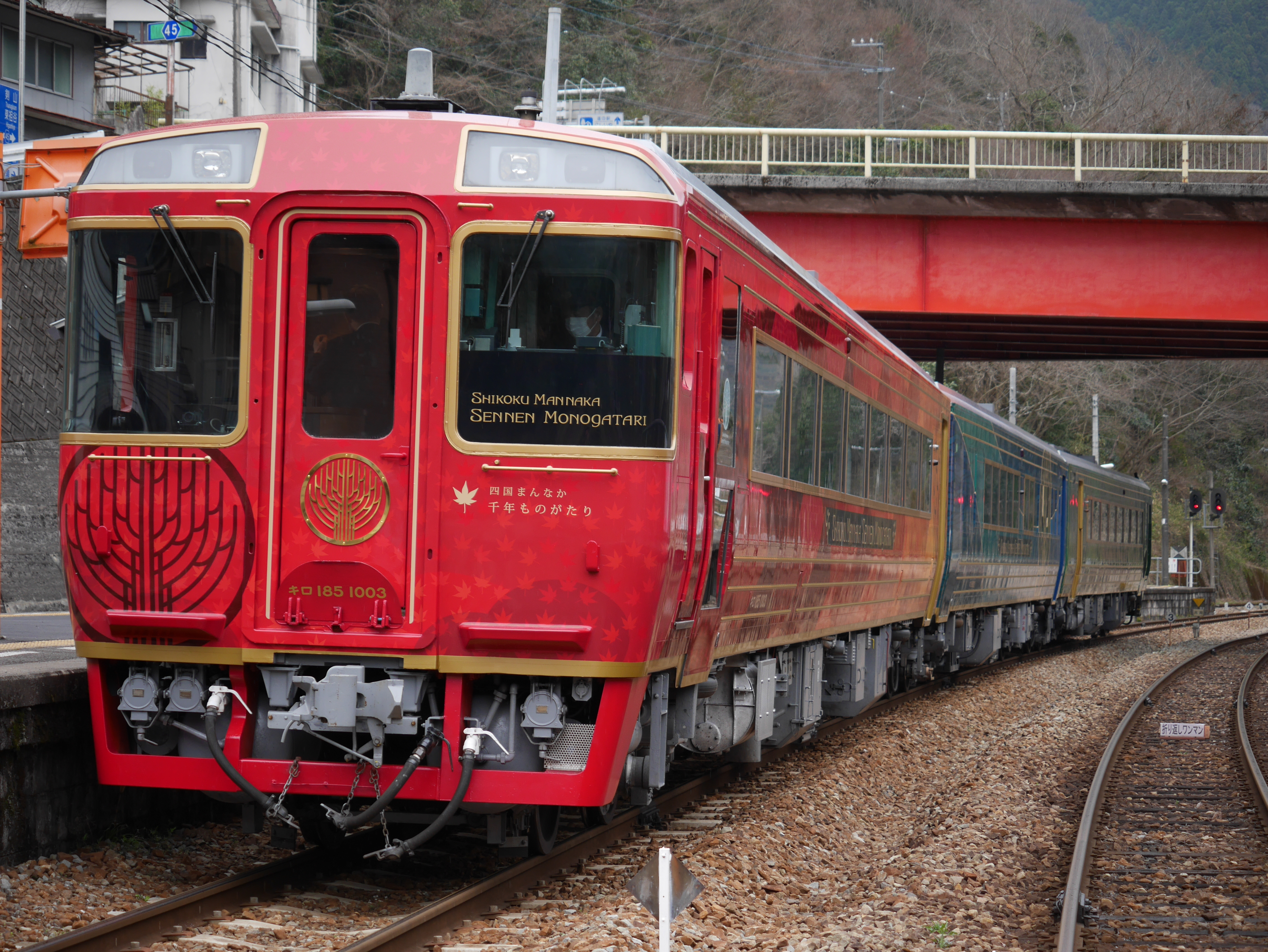
Shikoku Mannaka Sennen Monogatari

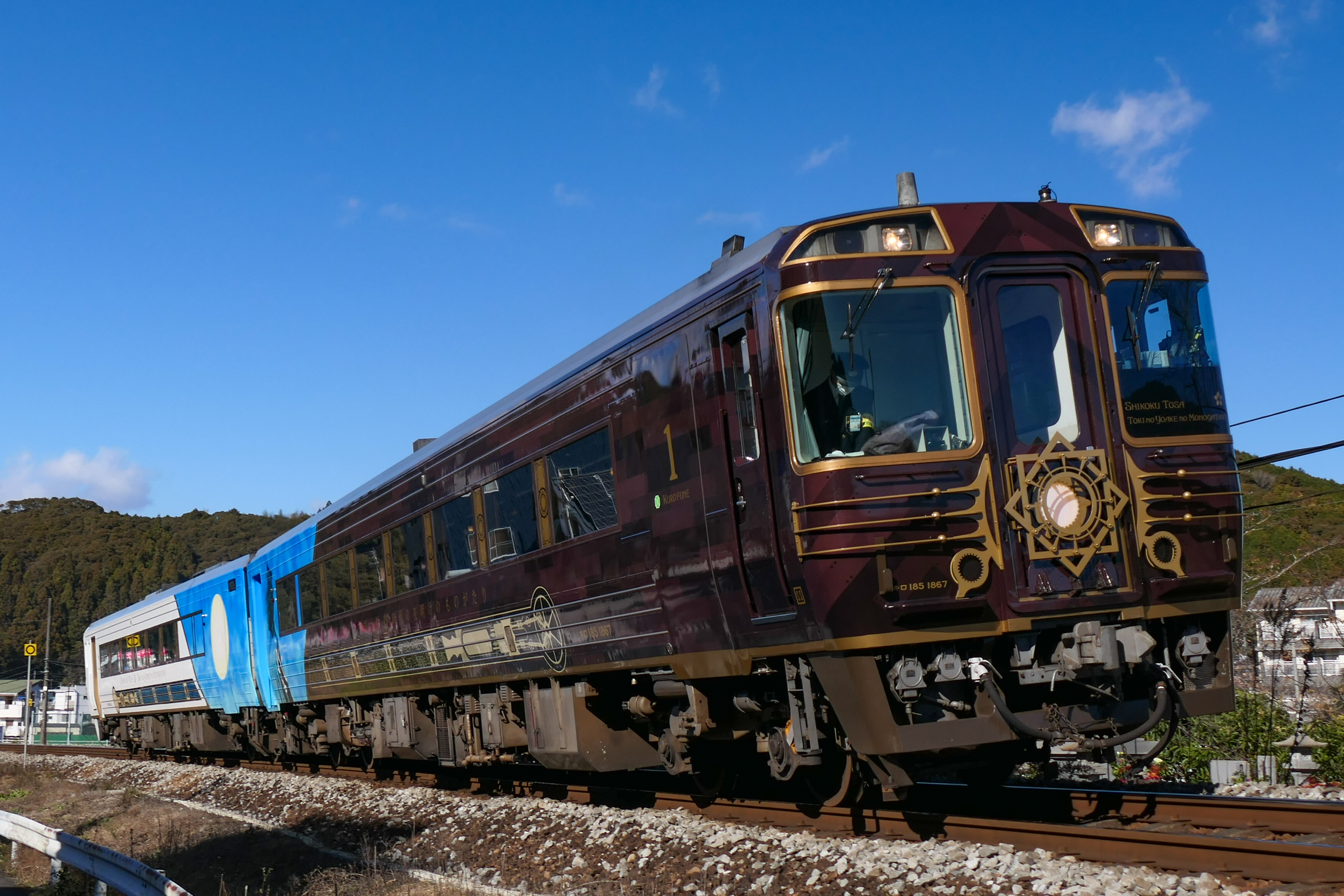
Shikoku Tosa Toki no Yoake no Monogatari

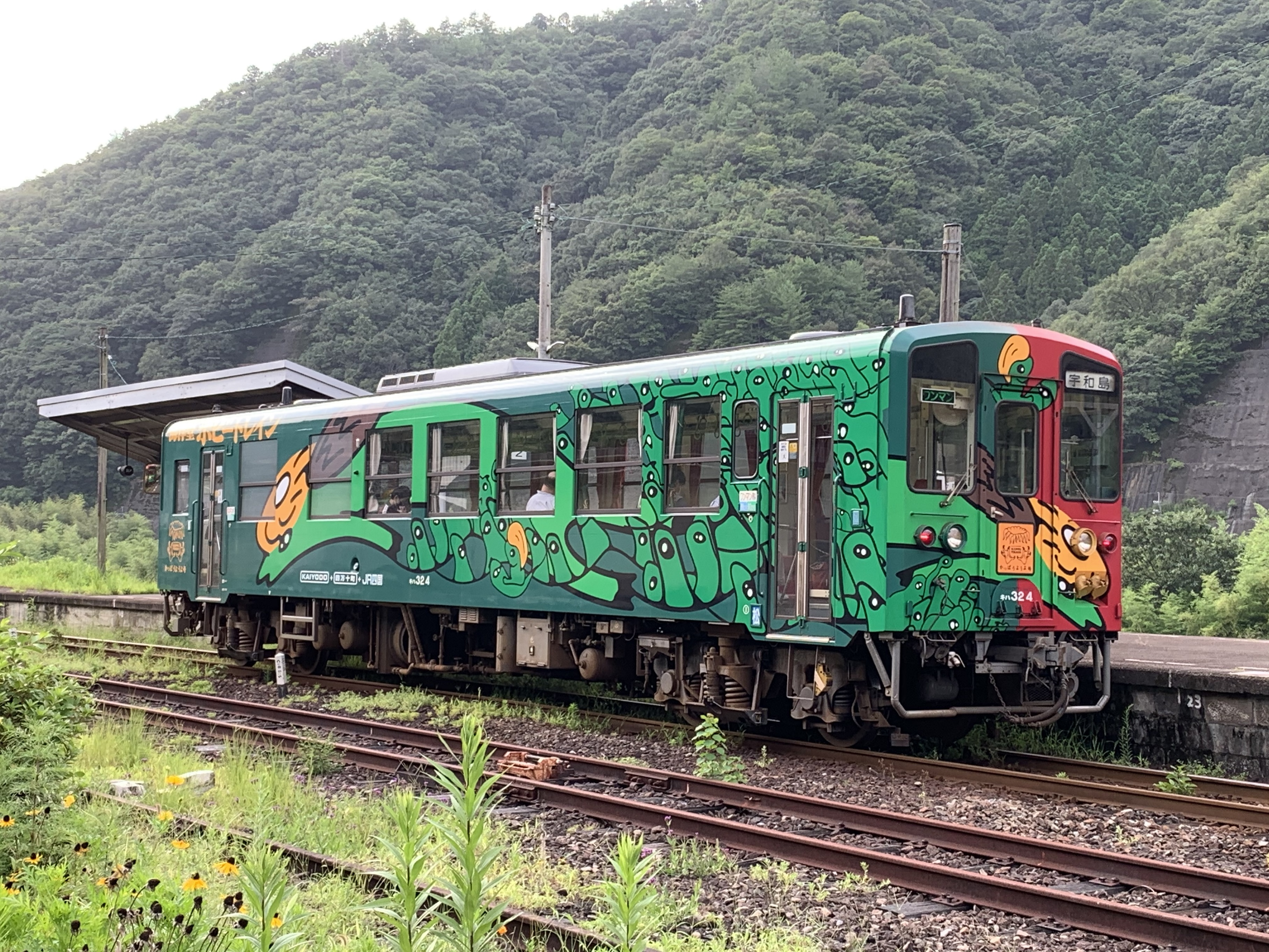
Kaiyodo Hobby Train in its most recent paint scheme

=== JR Kyushu ===
JR Kyushu officially does not operate any Joyful Trains in the traditional definition. However, the following sightseeing trainsets that they operate are classified as "D&S Trains" (Design and Story trains), as according to JR Kyushu, each train has a design and a story based on the region that they operate in. In addition, the Trans-Kyushu Limited Express is classified as a D&S Train as well despite not appearing on this list. Most D&S Trains are converted from regular rolling stock into sightseeing expresses, and are designed by Eiji Mitooka. The Kampachi Ichiroku was designed by IFOO Corporation instead. However, the Seven Stars in Kyushu is not classified as a D&S train, but a "Luxury Sleeper train".

==== EMU ====
Name	Japanese	Classification	No. of cars	Accommodation	Introduced	Converted from	Depot/region	Remarks
36 + 3	36ぷらす3	787 series	6	Seating/compartments	October 2020	787 series	Minami-Fukuoka	36 represents Kyushu (the 36th largest island in the world) and the 3 represents surprise, excitement, and happiness. In addition, "39" is pronounced like "Thank You" in Japanese.

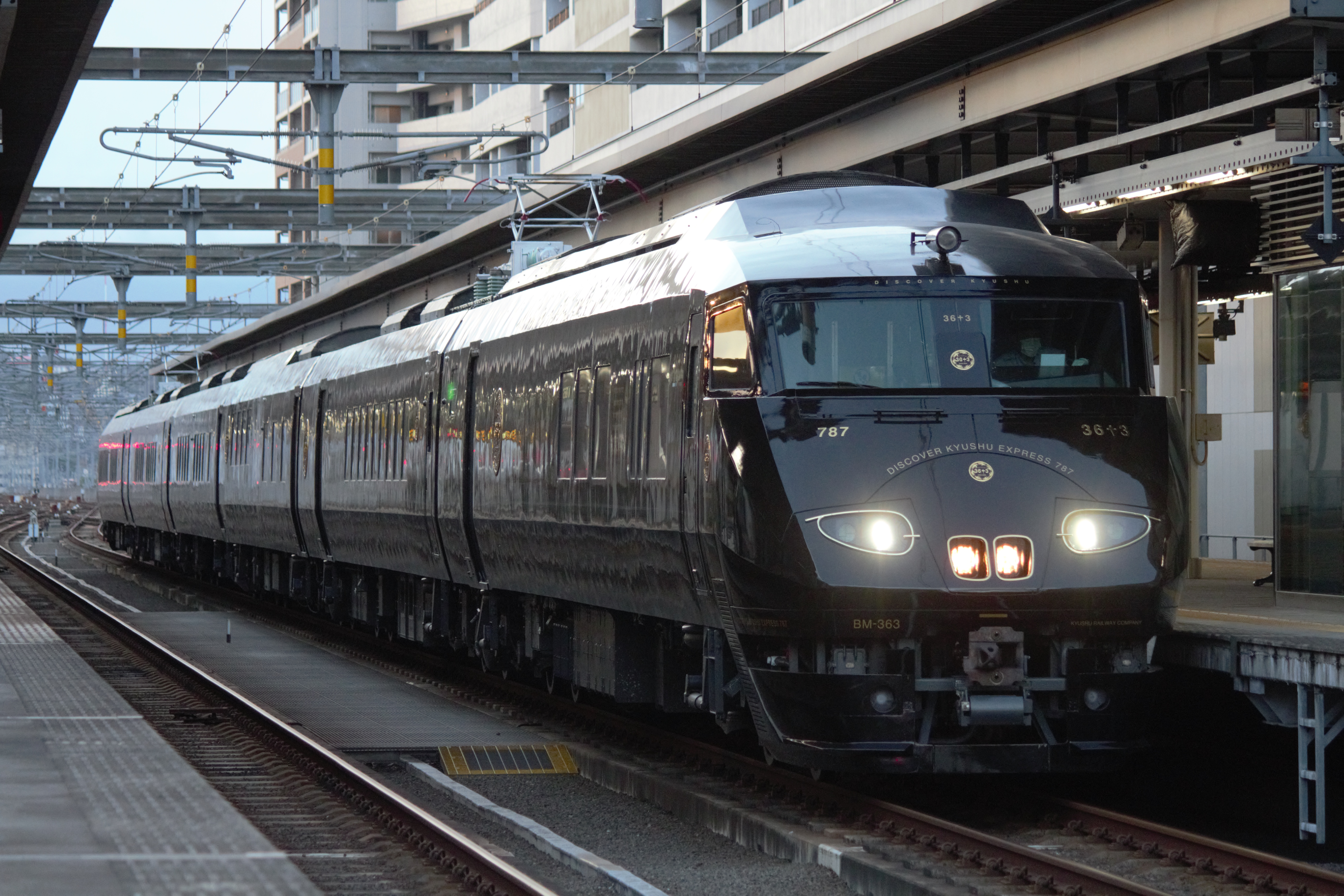
36 + 3, October 2020

==== DMU ====
Name	Japanese	Classification	No. of cars	Accommodation	Introduced	Converted from	Depot/region	Remarks
Aso Boy	あそぼーい！	KiHa 183-1000 series	4	Seating	June 2011	KiHa 183 series	Kumamoto	Converted from former Yufu DX.
A-Train	A列車で行こう	KiHa 185 series	2	Seating	October 2011	KiHa 185 series	Kumamoto	Equipped with a bar that serve local alcoholic beverages, and narration of the legend of Urashima Taro.
Two Stars 4047	ふたつ星4047	KiHa 47/40/147	3	Seating	August 2022	KiHa 47	Saga, Nagasaki	Converted from former Hayato no Kaze and an additional KiHa 140 car from former Isaburo / Shinpei.
Ibusuki no Tamatebako	指宿のたまて箱	KiHa 47/140	3	Seating	March 2011	KiHa 47	Kagoshima	KiHa 140 series car converted from former Hayato no Kaze car in March 2012. When the door opens, white smoke resembling that from a Tamatebako are dispensed from the top of the door.
Umisachi Yamasachi	海幸山幸	KiHa 125-400	2	Seating	October 2009	TR 400	Miyazaki	Converted from former Takachiho Railway TR 400. Offers handmade picture-stories for sale on board.
Yufuin no Mori	ゆふいんの森	KiHa 71 series	4	Seating	1989	KiHa 58/65 series	Chikuho	a.k.a."Yufuin no Mori I"
New Yufuin no Mori	新ゆふいんの森	KiHa 72 series	4	Seating	1999	Purpose-built	Chikuho	a.k.a."Yufuin no Mori III"
Aru Ressha	或る列車	KiRoShi 47	2	Seating	August 2015	KiHa 47	Oita	Inspired by the Brill Railway cars "Aru Ressha" that the Meiji-era Kyushu Railway ordered from the United States.
Kampachi / Ichiroku	かんぱち・いちろく	2R Series	3	Seating	April 2024	KiHa 40 & KiHa 125	Chikuho	Converted from former Isaburo Shinpei trainset using two KiHa 47 cars and one KiHa 125 car.
Orange Restaurant	おれんじ食堂	Hisatsu Orange Railway HSOR-100	2	Seating	2013	Hisatsu Orange Railway HSOR-100	Kagoshima	Jointly operated by JR Kyushu and Hisatsu Orange Railway, a Third Sector rail operator in Kagoshima. Exterior designed by Eiji Mitooka.

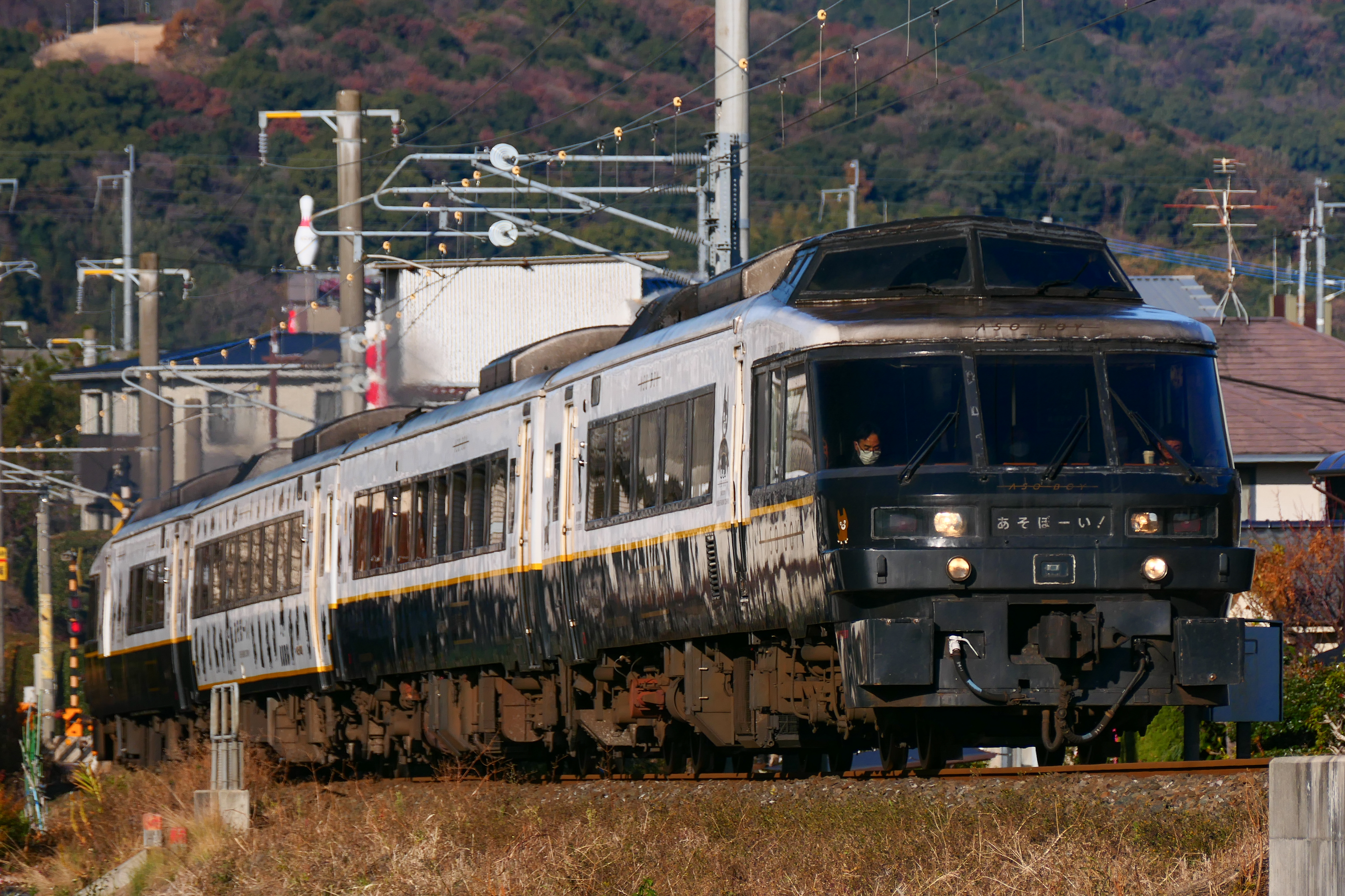
Aso Boy, January 2023

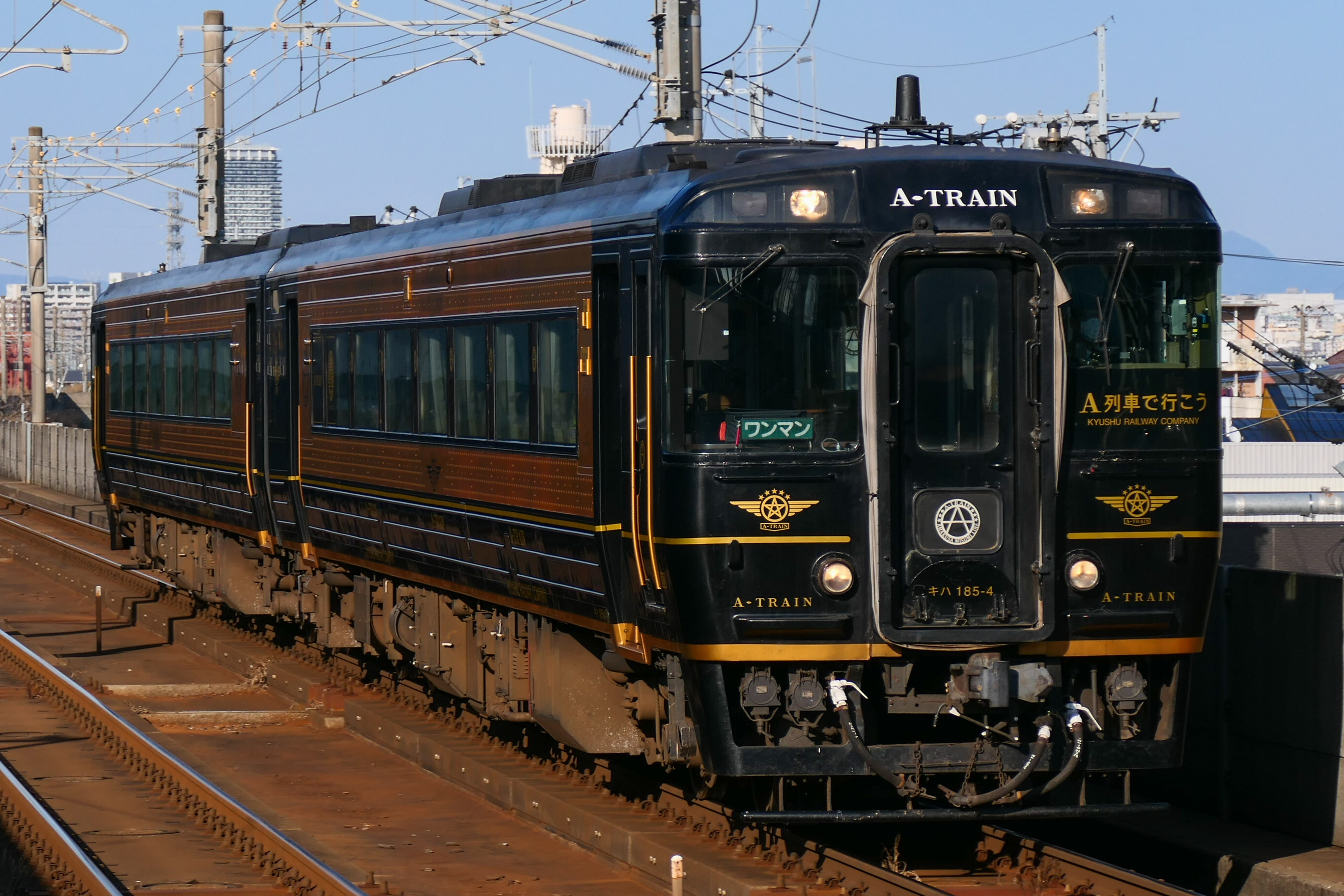
A-Train, January 2023

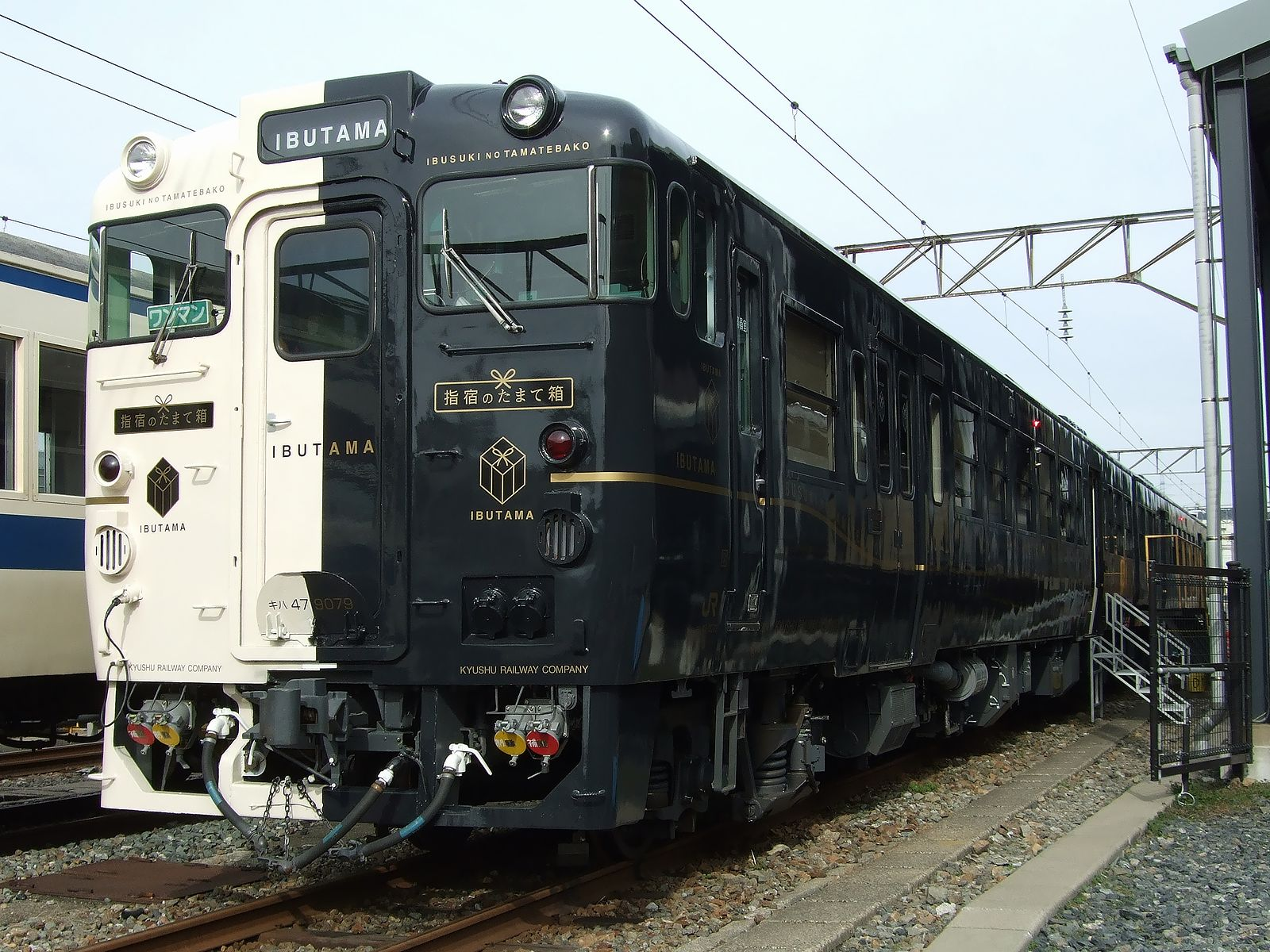
Ibusuki no Tamatebako, February 2011

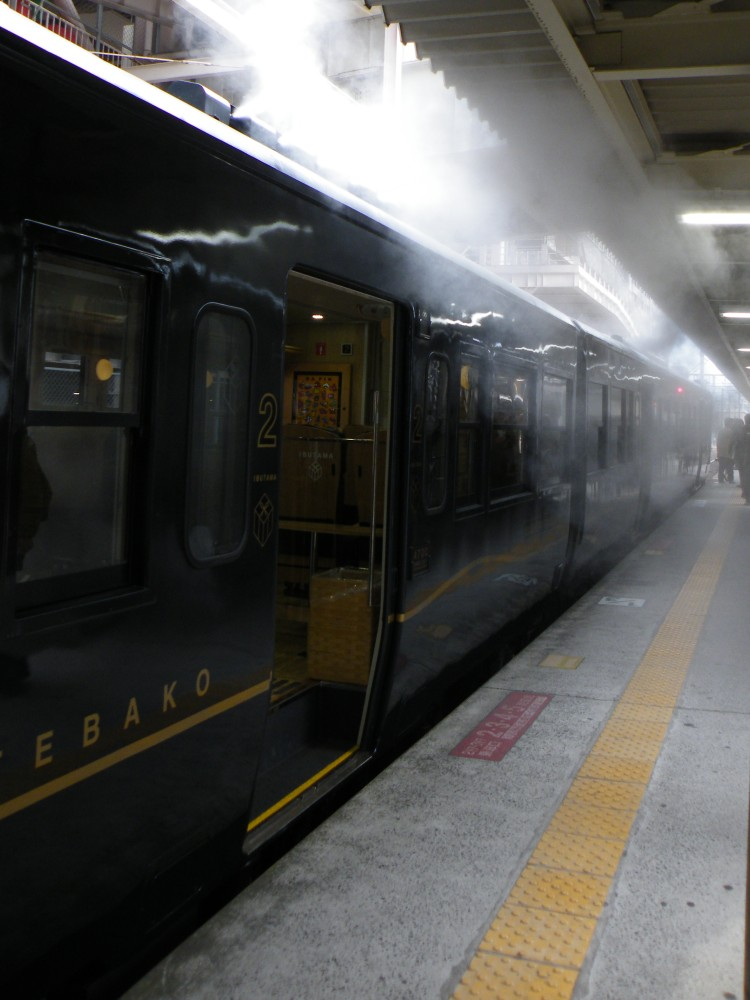
Ibusuki no Tamatebako dispensing mist upon door opening

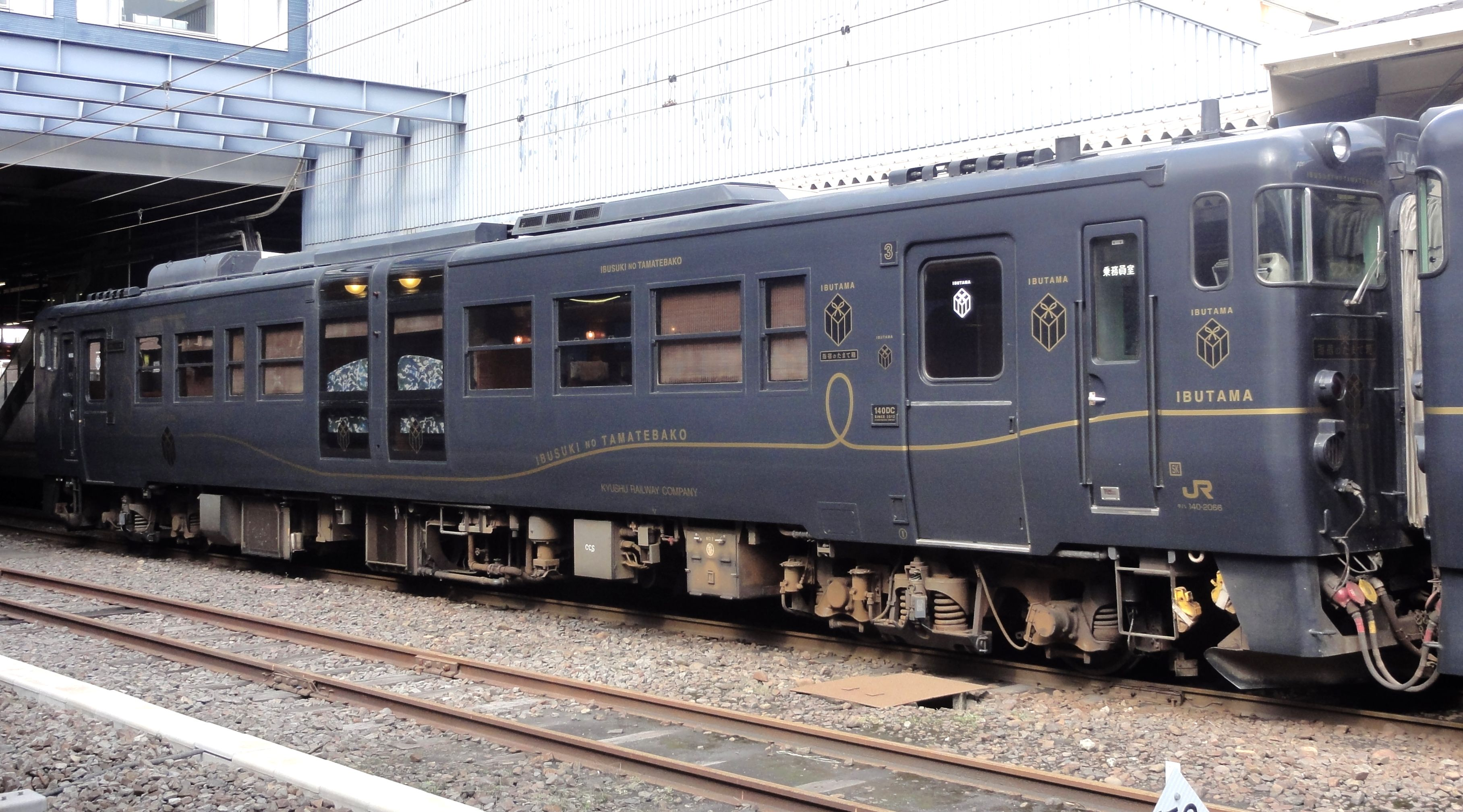
Car 3, KiHa 140-2066 of Ibusuki no Tamatebako. Note the enlarged observation window.

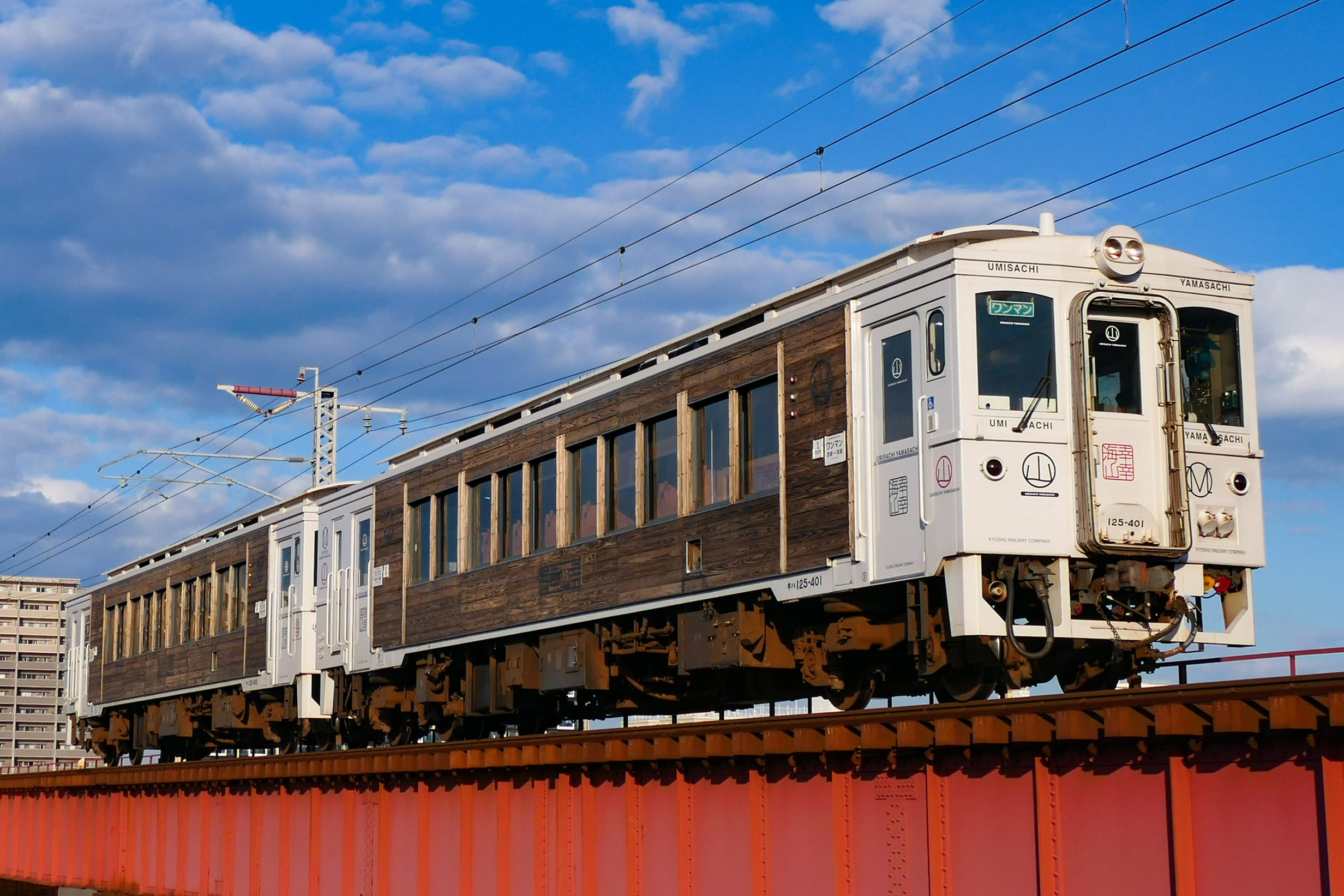
Umisachi Yamasachi, December 2024

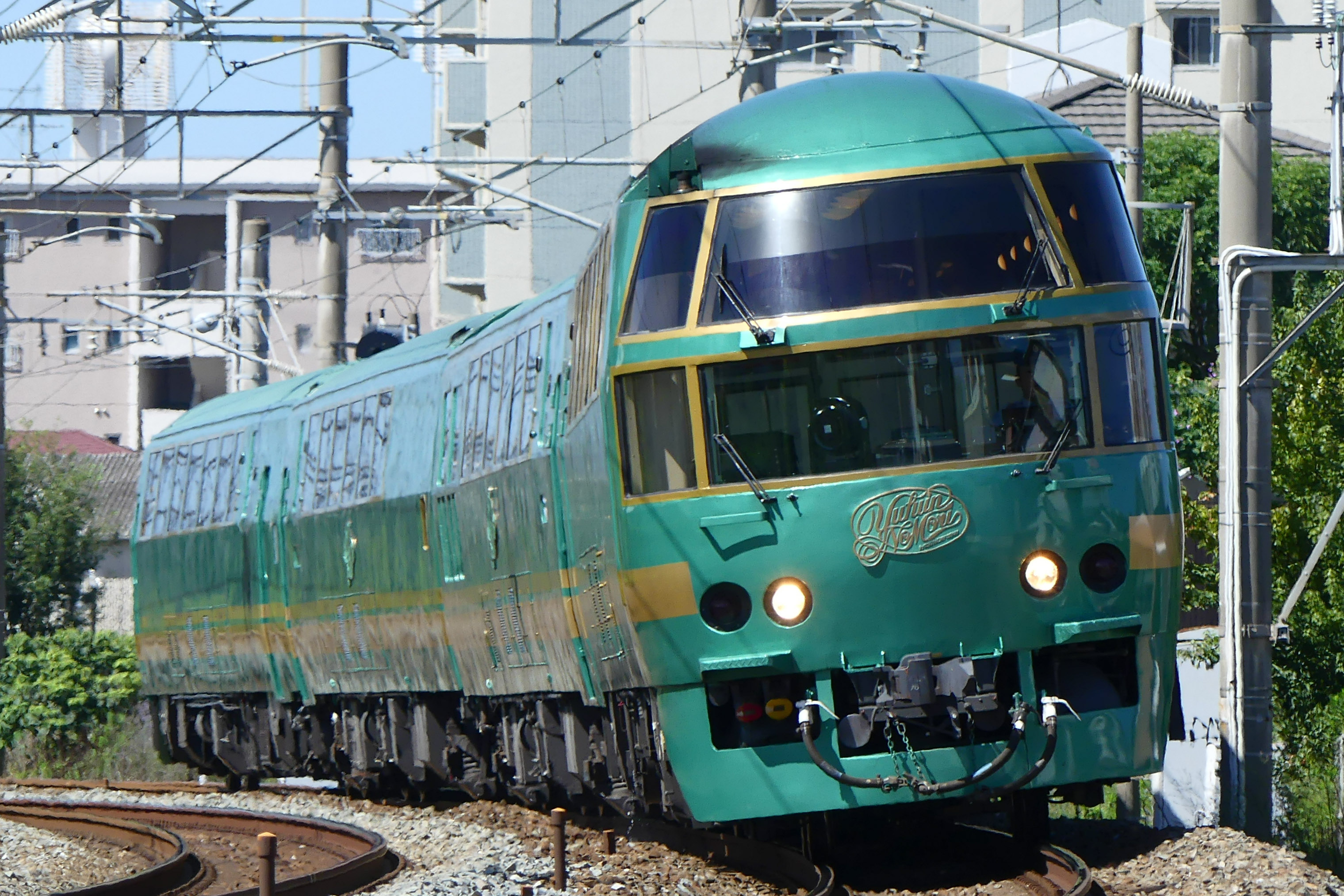
Yufuin no Mori, August 2017

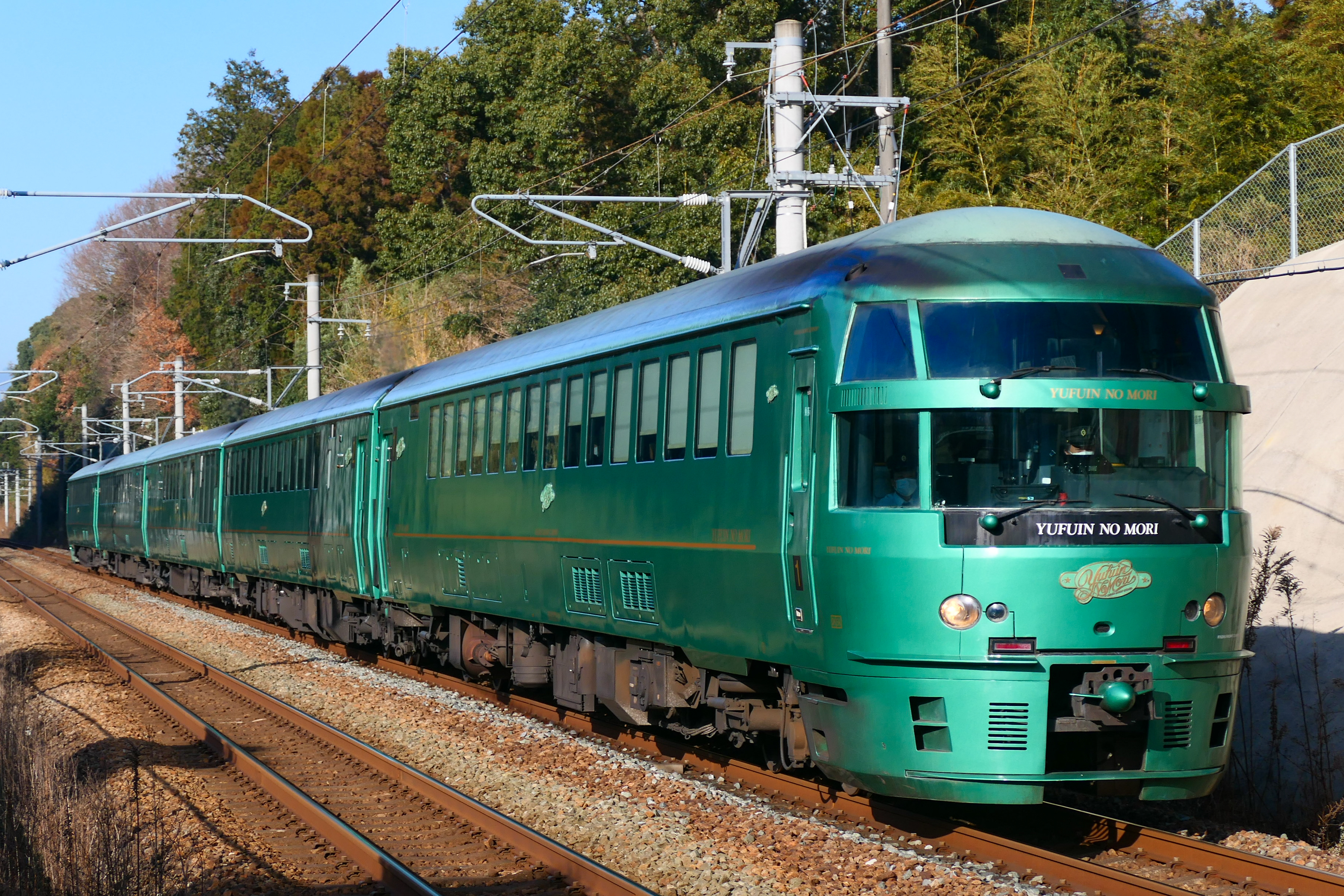
New Yufuin no Mori, January 2023

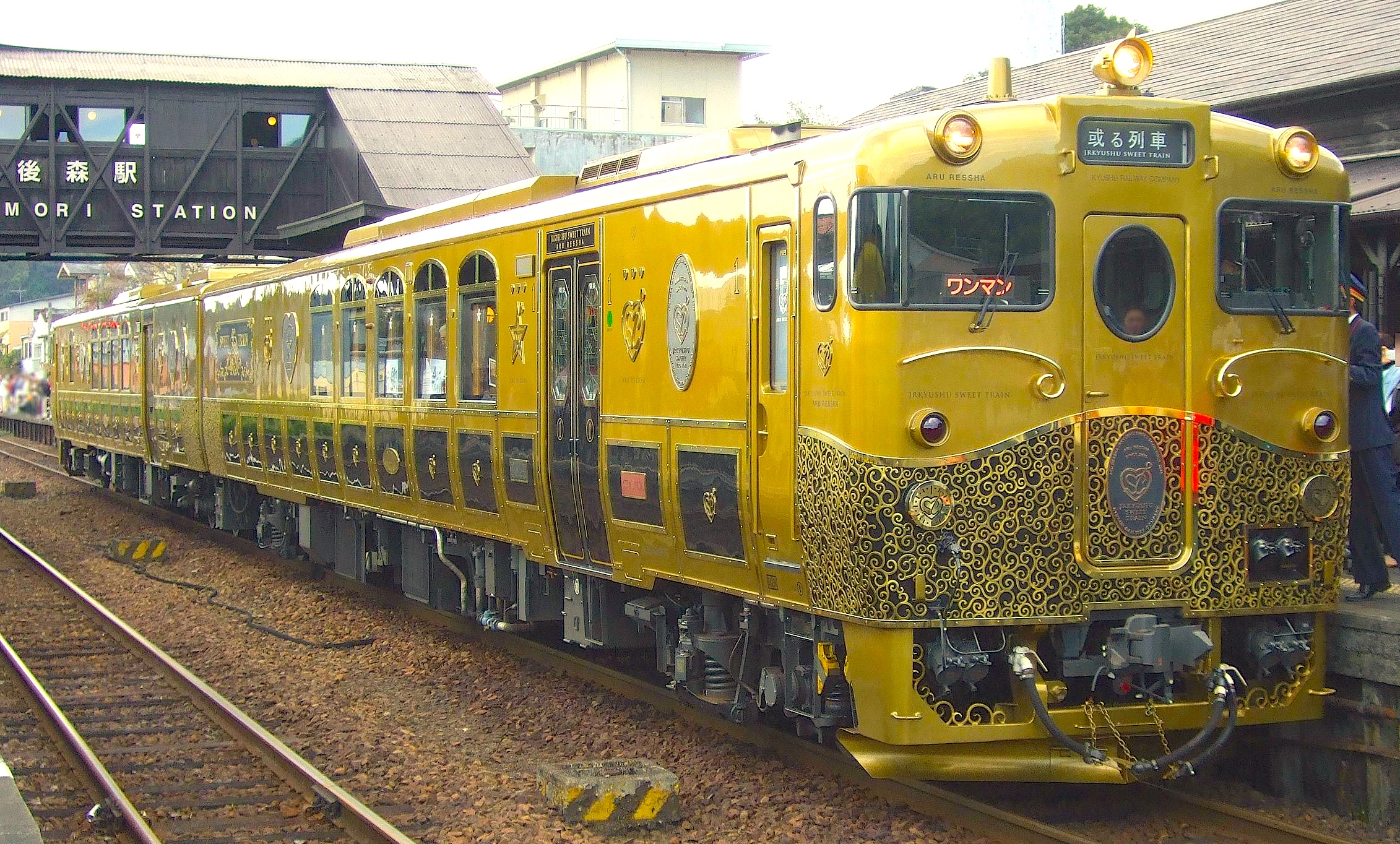
Aru Ressha, October 2015

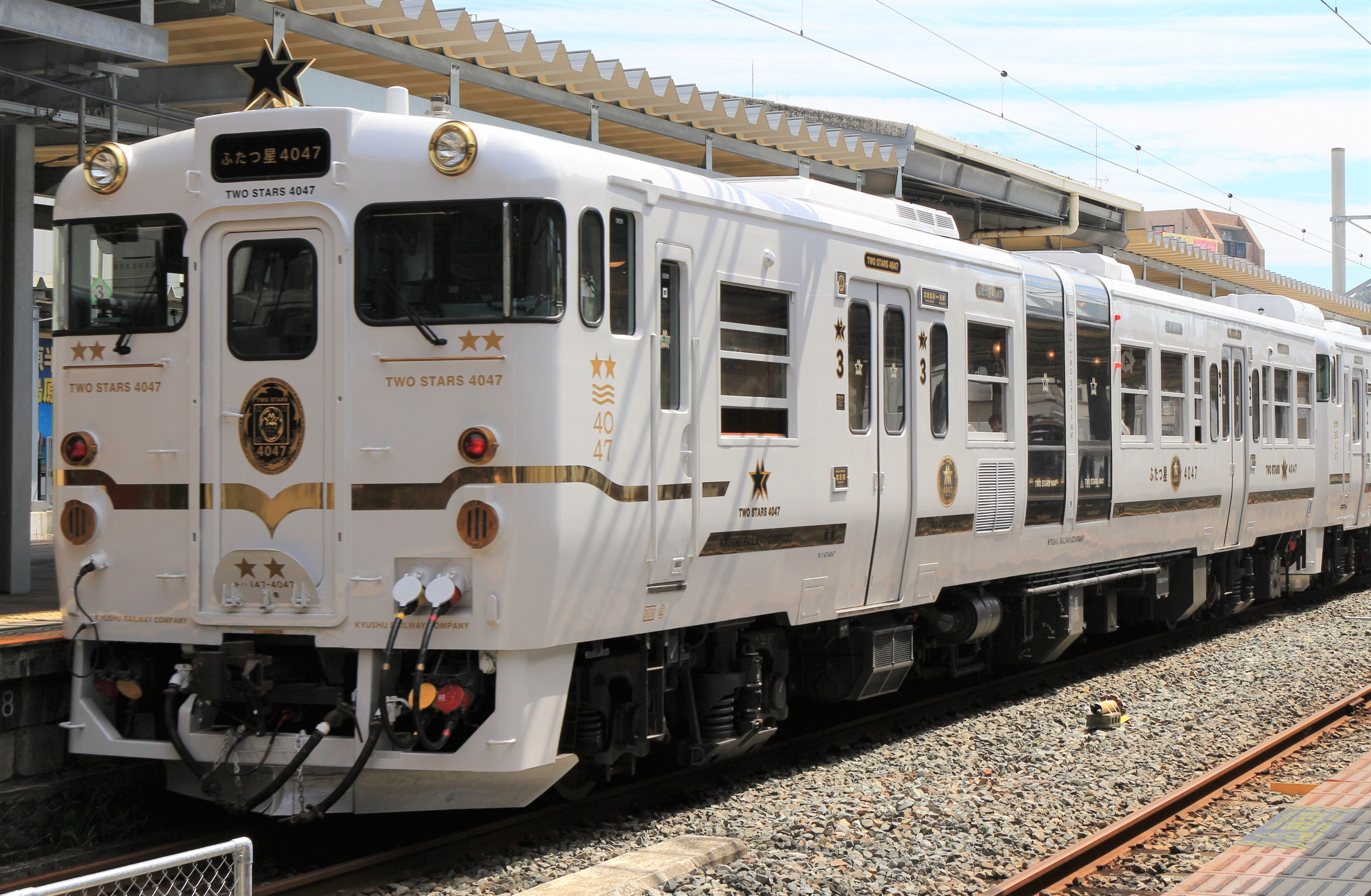
Two Stars 4047

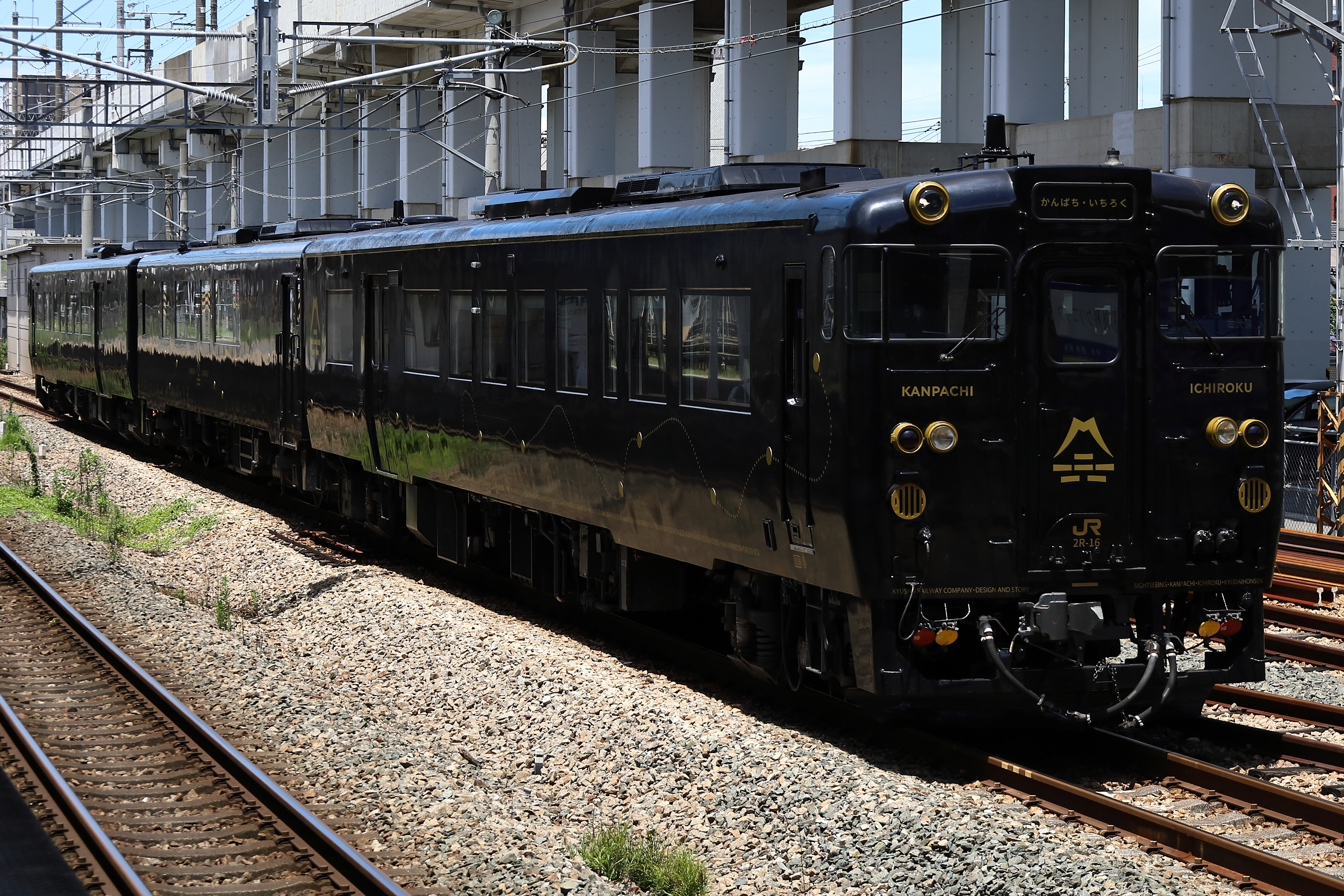
Kampachi / Ichiroku

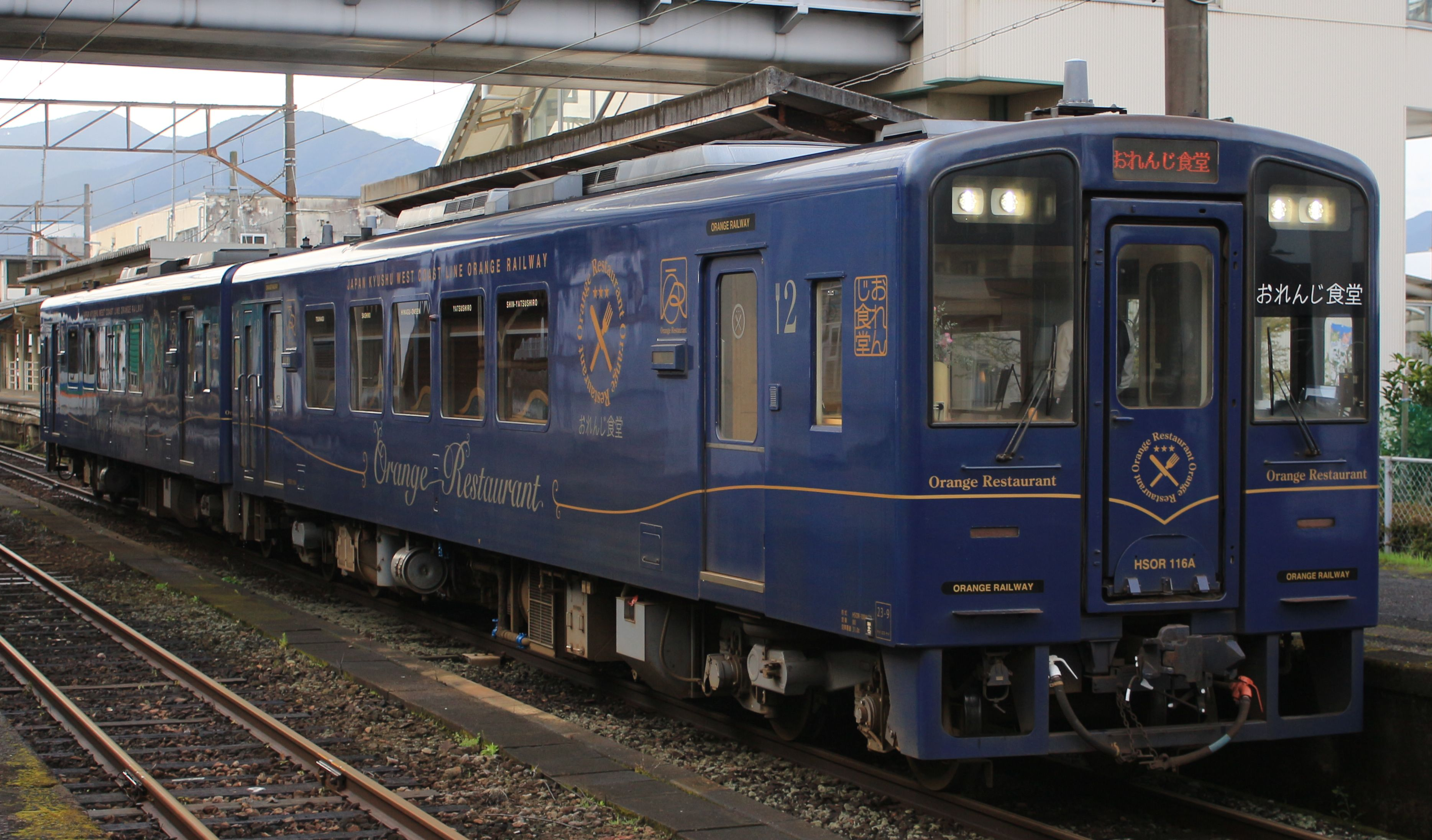
Orange Restaurant

==== Loco hauled ====
Name	Japanese	Classification	No. of cars	Accommodation	Introduced	Converted from	Depot/region	Remarks
Seven Stars in Kyushu	ななつ星in九州	77 series	7	Sleeping car	October 2013	Purpose-built	Ōita	

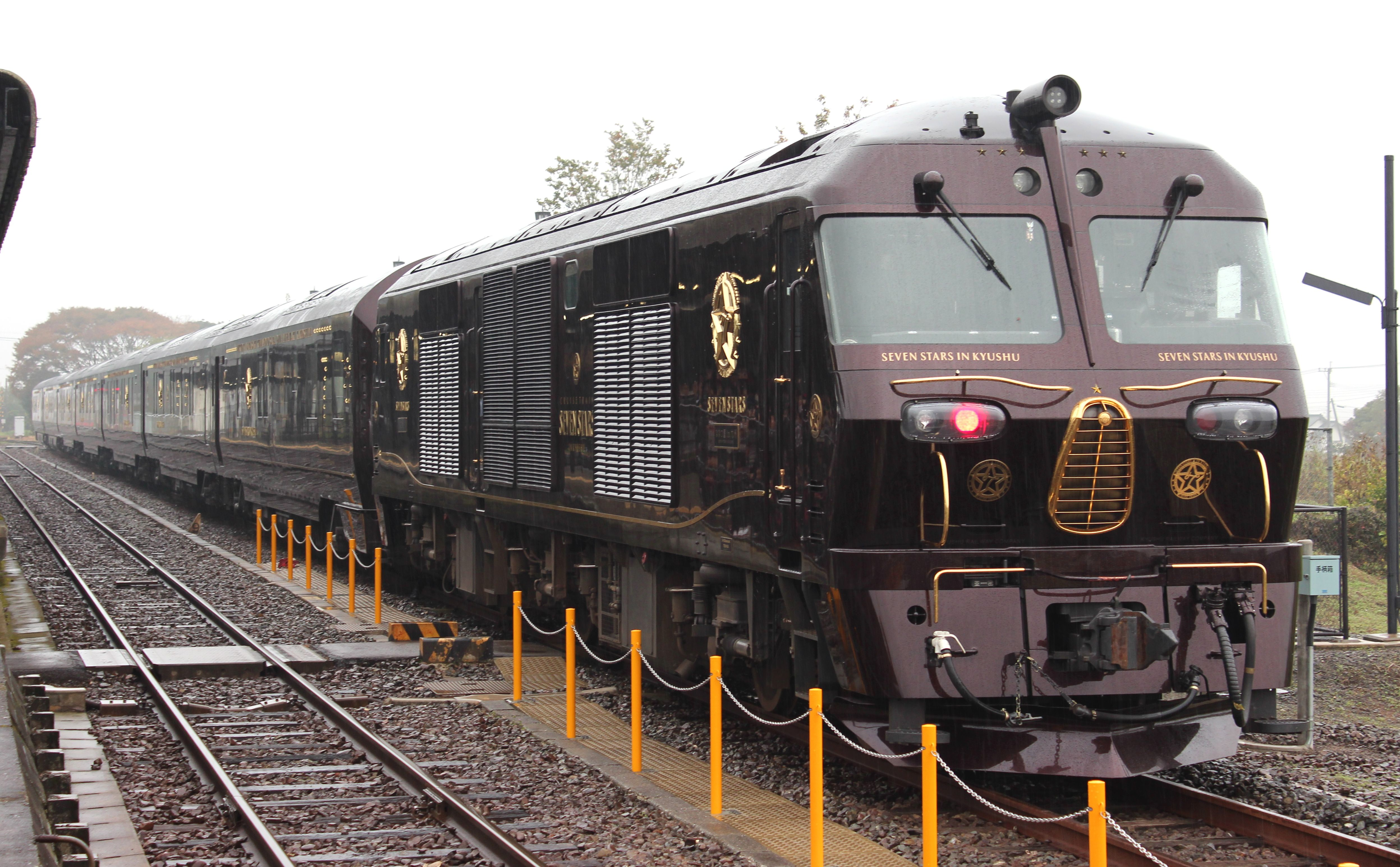
The Seven Stars in Kyushu trainset hauled by DF200 7000, November 2013

== Past Joyful Train sets ==
=== JNR ===
==== DMU ====
Name	Japanese	Classification	No. of cars	Accommodation	Introduced	Withdrawn	Converted from	Depot/region	Remarks
Batten Nagasaki	ばってんNAGASAKI	KiHa 58 Series	2	Tatami	1985	December 1986	KiHa 28 series	Nagasaki	Karaokes and Mahjong tables were installed in the two cars, KiHa 28-2006 and KiHa 28-2114.
Rakuda	らくだ	KiHa 58 Series	2	Seating	1983 (initial introduction)	1987	KiHa 58 series	Kagoshima	Three sets in total, all introduced between 1983 and 1986. All have karaoke machines. Retired due to the Privatisation of JNR and two of the three were converted into Yutopia (of JR Kyushu) and Kichishiroku.

==== Loco hauled ====
Name	Japanese	Classification	No. of cars	Accommodation	Introduced	Withdrawn	Converted from	Depot/region	Remarks
Miyabi	みやび	14-800 series	7	Tatami	March 1986	28 December 1986	14 series	Miyahara, Osaka	Withdrawn following fatal accident.

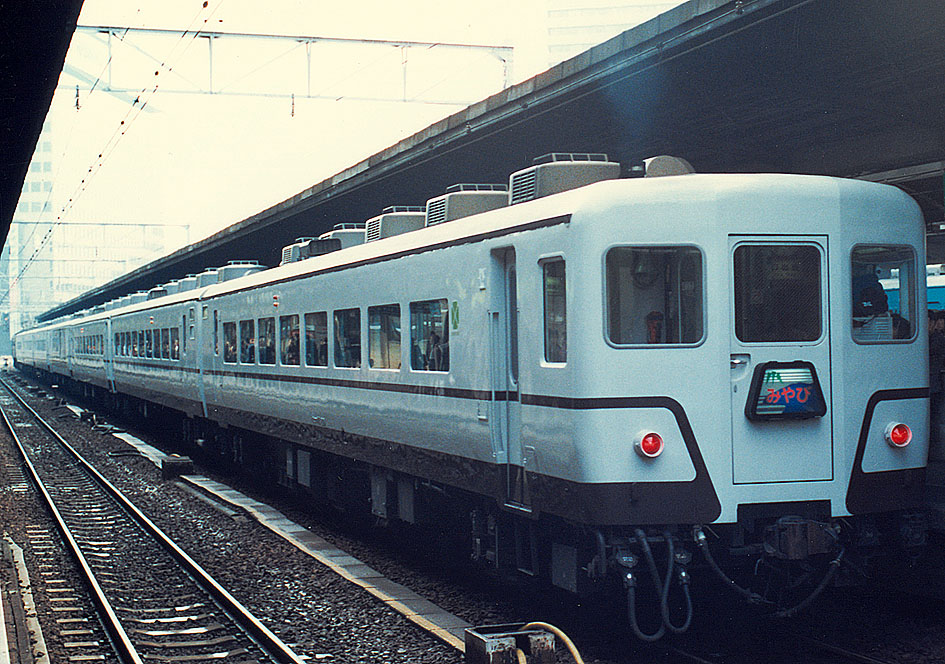
Miyabi 14-800 series car

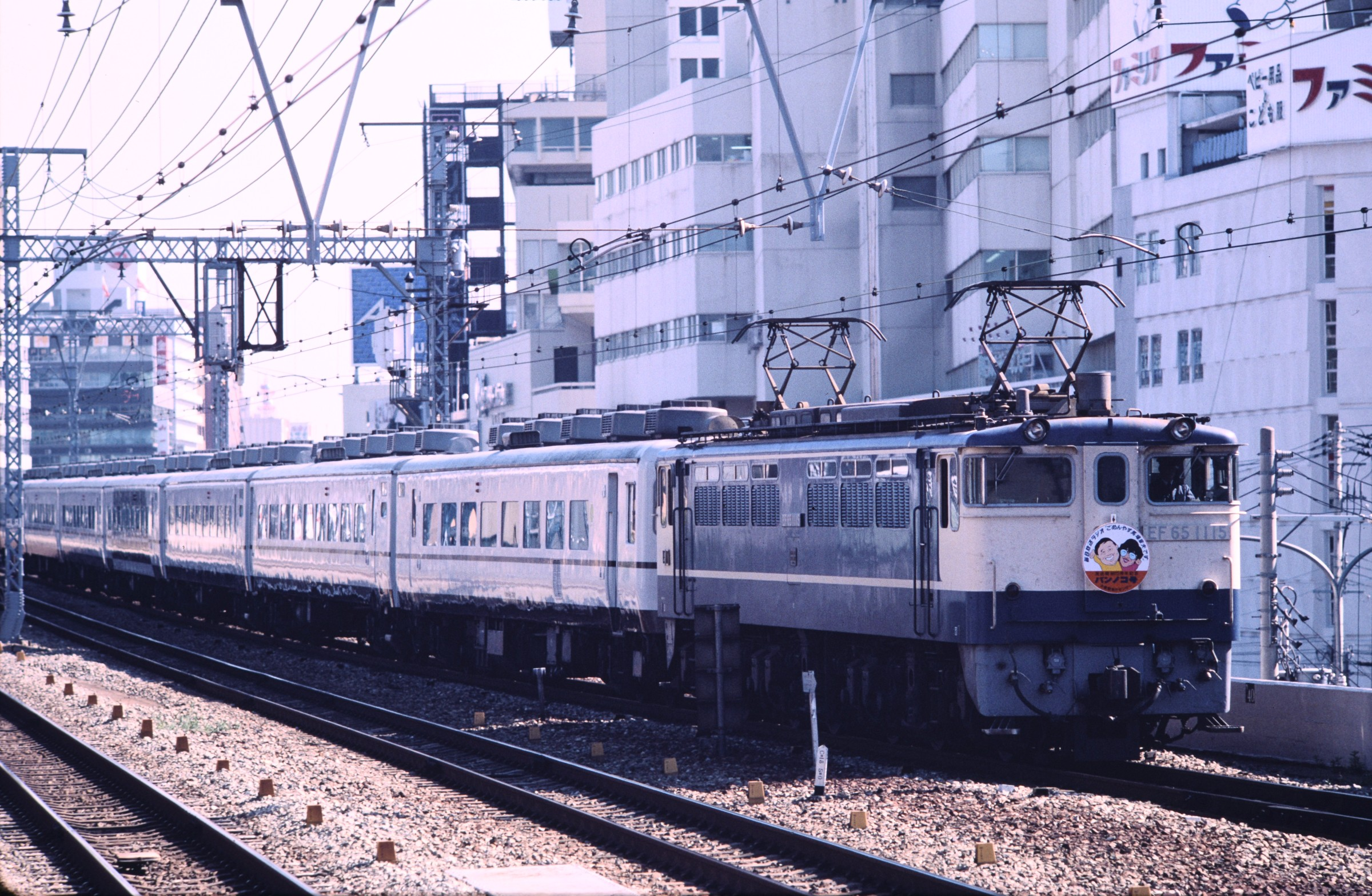
Miyabi operating the BanNokogo service

=== JR Hokkaido ===
==== DMU ====
Name	Japanese	Classification	No. of cars	Accommodation	Introduced	Withdrawn	Converted from	Depot/region	Remarks
Furano Express	フラノエクスプレス	KiHa 80 series	4	Seating	December 1986	November 1998	KiHa 80 series	Naebo	KiHa 84-1 + KiHa 80-501 + KiHa 83-1 + KiHa 84-101
Mountain Lake Onuma	マウントレイク大沼	KiHa 80 series	3	Seating	July 1999	2002	KiHa 80 series	Naebo	Converted from former "Tomamu & Sahoro Express".
Tomamu & Sahoro Express	トマムサホロエクスプレス	KiHa 80 series	5	Seating	December 1987	July 1999	KiHa 80 series	Naebo	Converted to become "Mountain Lake Onuma".
Alpha Continental Express	アルファコンチネンタルエクスプレス	KiHa 59 series	3/4	Seating	December 1985	1995	KiHa 59 series	Naebo	Both end cars preserved: Kiha 59-1 (cab only) is in JR Hokkaido's Naebo Workshop, while Kiha 59-2 is in a park in Chitose.
Niseko Express	ニセコエクスプレス	KiHa 183-5000 series	3	Seating	December 1988	November 2017	KiHa 183 series	Naebo	KiHa 183-5001 lead car preserved after crowdfunding "Save our Niseko" campaign.
Asahiyama Dobutsuen	旭山動物園号	KiHa 183 series	5	Seating	April 2007	March 2018	KiHa 183 series	Sapporo	Refurbished in 2013. After withdrawal of this particular train, the 'Asahiyama Zoo' limited express was operated using regular 789 series EMUs before eventually being folded into the Lilac.
Crystal Express Tomamu & Sahoro	クリスタルエクスプレス トマム・サホロ	KiHa 183-5100 series	4	Seating	December 1989	September 2019	KiHa 183 series	Naebo	Initially 3 cars
North Rainbow Express	ノースレインボーエクスプレス	KiHa 183-5200 series	5	Seating	July 1992	2023	KiHa 183 series	Naebo	
Kutsurogi (KiHa 29)	くつろぎ	KiHa 29 series	3	Tatami	1973	1997	KiHa 27 series	Sapporo	First iteration of "Kutsurogi". Originally painted in regular JNR colors with a green band. Supplanted by a KiHa 59 based trainset in 1984.
Kutsurogi (KiHa 56)	くつろぎ	KiHa 56-500	2	Tatami	1984	1997	KiHa 56 series	Sapporo	The cars were named "Onuma" and "Toyako". Scrapped in 1997 along with the KiHa 29 based set.
Kutsurogi (KiHa 400)	くつろぎ	KiHa 400-500	3	Tatami	1998	2015	KiHa 56 series	Sapporo	
Kutsurogi (KiHa 183)	くつろぎ	KiHa 183-6000 series	3	Tatami	1999	2015/2022	KiHa 183 series	Sapporo	KiHa 182-6001 was scrapped in 2015 while the remaining cars operated in a 2 car set. They were repainted into regular JR Hokkaido Limited Express color scheme and the "Kutsurogi" nameplate was dropped. The set was scrapped in 2022.
Ryuhyu Monogatari (KiHa 54)	流氷物語	KiHa 54	2	Seating	2017	2020	KiHa 54	Abashiri	KiHa 54-508 Collided with a tanker truck in 2020.

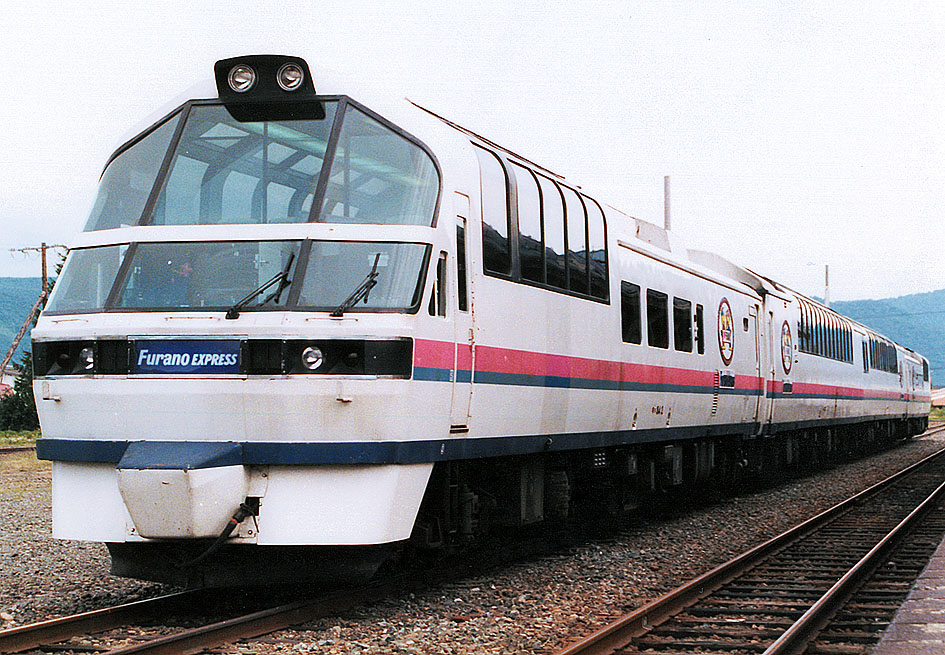
Furano Express KiHa 80 series DMU, 1990

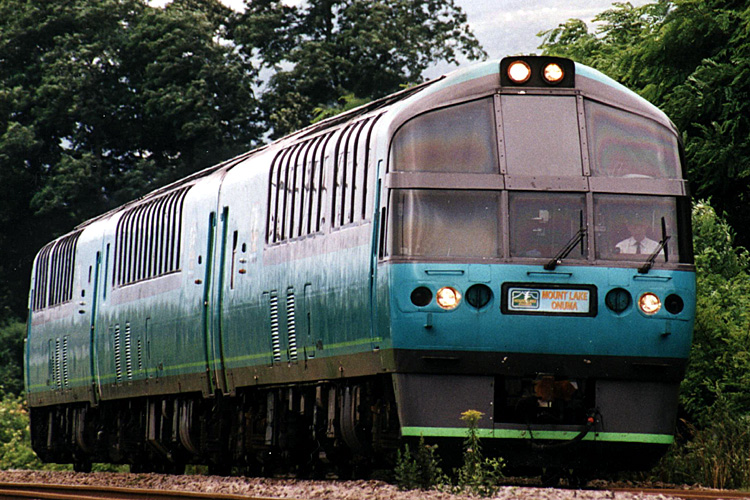
Mountain Lake Onuma KiHa 80 series DMU

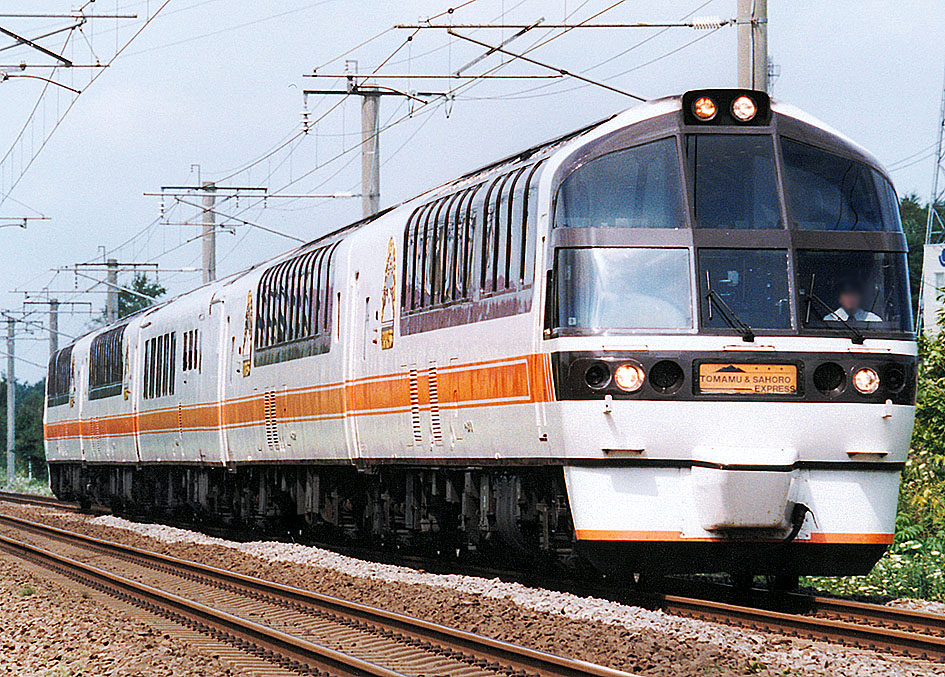
Tomamu & Sahoro Express KiHa 80 series DMU, 1992

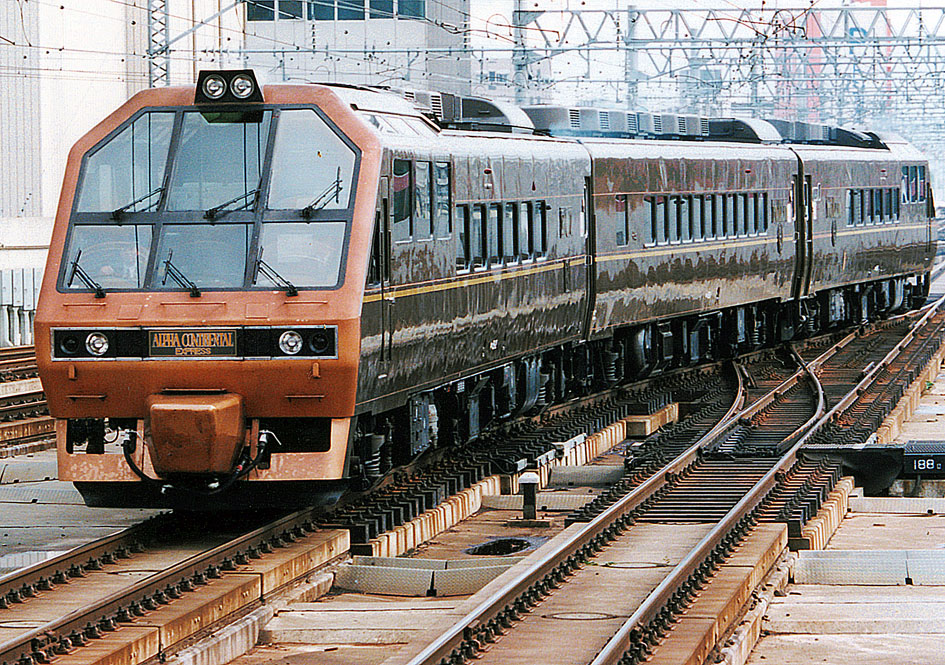
Alpha Continental Express KiHa 59 series DMU in 1994

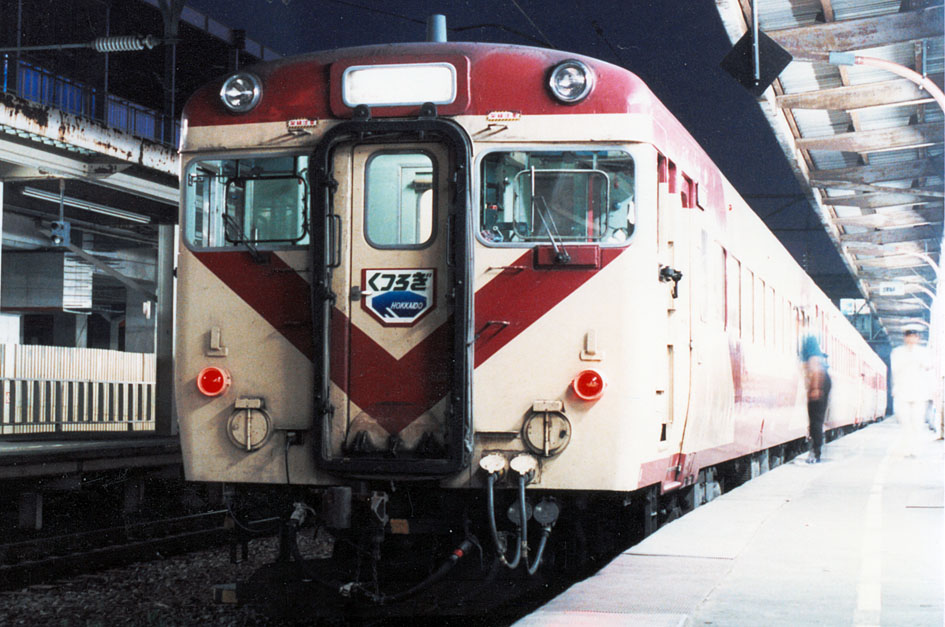
Kutsurogi (KiHa 29) in 1986

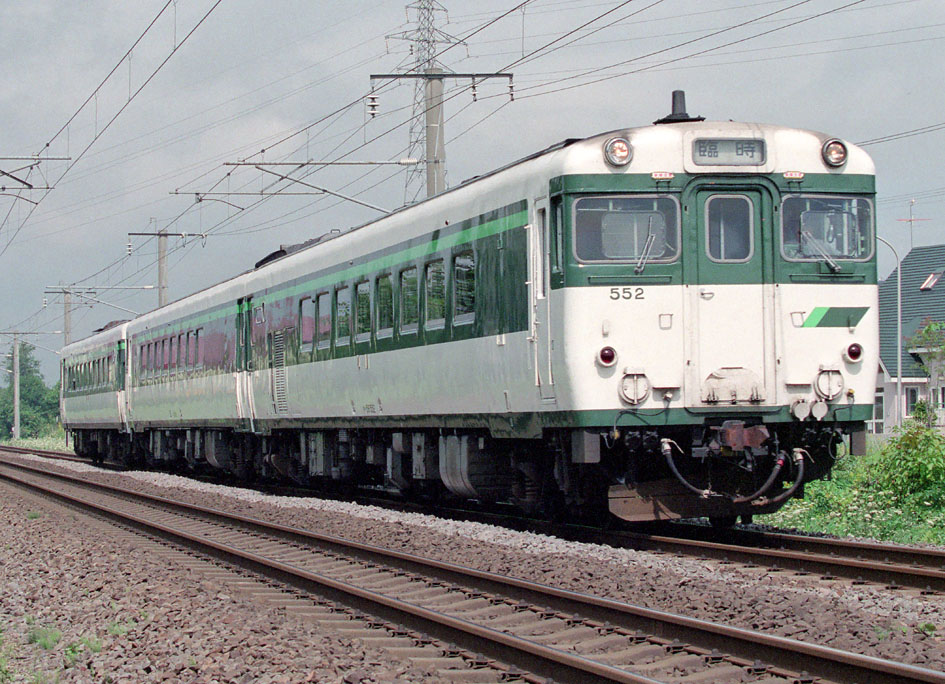
Kutsurogi (KiHa 56-552) in 1991

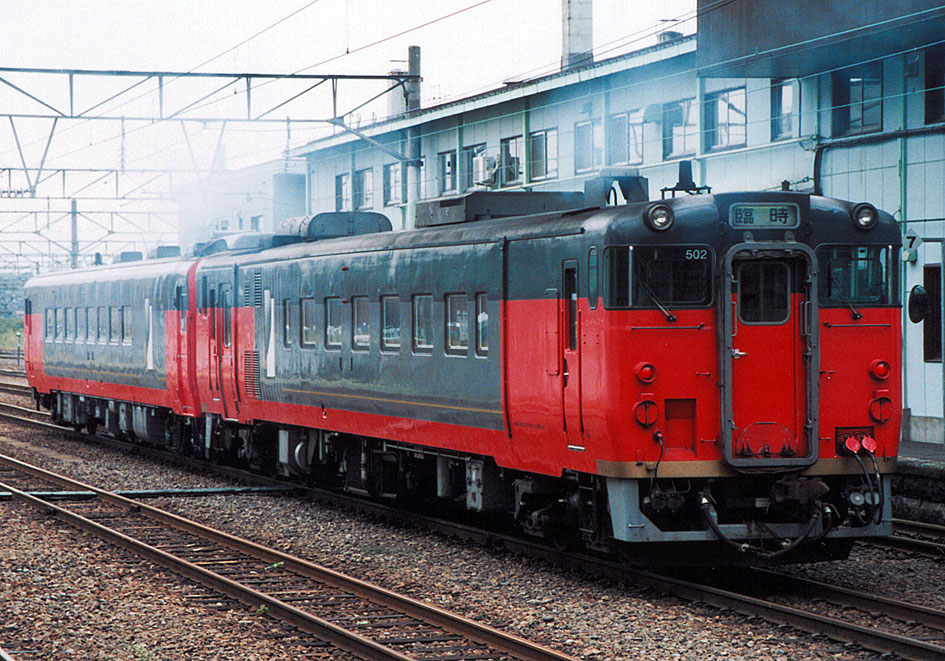
Kutsurogi (KiHa 400-502)

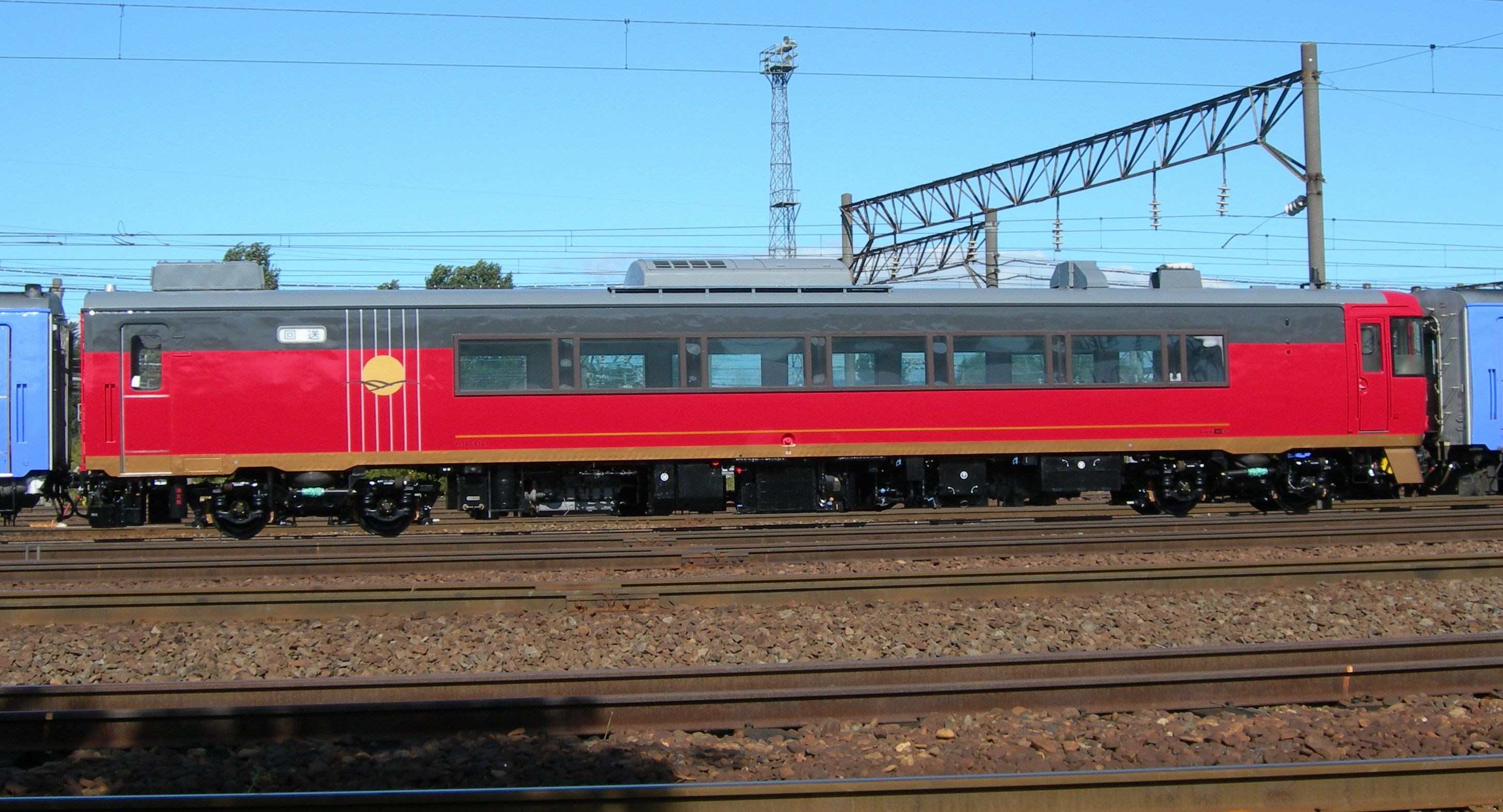
Kutsurogi (KiHa 183-6101) in 2009

==== Loco-Hauled ====
Name	Japanese	Classification	No. of cars	Accommodation	Introduced	Withdrawn	Converted from	Depot/region	Remarks
Ryuhyu Norokko	流氷ノロッコ	510 Series	4	Seating	1990	2016	50 Series	Abashiri	Replaced by Ryuhyu Monogatari.
SL Okhotsk	SLオホーツク号	14 Series	4	Seating	2011	2013	14 Series	Abashiri	

=== JR East ===
==== EMU ====
Name	Japanese	Classification	No. of cars	Accommodation	Introduced	Withdrawn	Converted from	Depot/region	Remarks
Joyful Train Alpha	ジョイフルトレイン・アルファ	165 series	3	Seating	December 1995	May 2001	165 series	Niigata	Converted from Shuttle Maihama.
Ayano	彩野	183 series	6	Seating	March 2006	2011	183 series	Nikkō	Replaced by 253 series.
IZU CRAILE	伊豆クレイル	651 series	4	Seating	July 2016	March 2020	651 series	Izu	The name "CRAILE" came from C (Cool), Rail, and E (Elegant). Jointly operated by JR East and Izukyū Corporation.
FruiTea Fukushima	フルーティアふくしま	719-700 series	2	Seating	2015	Dec 24th, 2023	719 series	Sendai	Will be replaced by SATONO.
Iroha	いろは	205-600 series	4	Seating	2018	11 March 2022	205-600 series		2 doors removed per side and LCD screen inserted.
Nanohana	なのはな	165 series	6	Tatami	March 1986	August 1998	165 series	Chiba	First EMU-based Joyful Train. Replaced by New Nanohana.
New Nanohana	ニューなのはな	485 series	6	Tatami	February 1998	August 2016	485 series	Makuhari, Chiba	
Resort Yamadori	リゾートやまどり	485 series	6	Seating	2011	11 December 2022	485 series	Takasaki	Rebuilt from former Seseragi and two cars of former Yamanami. Last 485 series train in service.
Zipangu	ジパング	485 series	4	Seating	1 April 2012	10 October 2021	485 series		Rebuilt from former Yamanami end cars and two 485-3000 series intermediate cars.
Panorama Express Alps	パノラマエクスプレスアルプス	165 series	6	Seating	March 1987	September 2001	165 series	Mitaka, Tokyo	Sold to Fuji Kyuko in December 2001.
Seseragi	せせらぎ	485 series	4	Tatami	March 2001	2010	485 series	Takasaki	Replaced loco-hauled Yasuragi set. Combined with Yamanami and rebuilt as Resort Yamadori.
Shikisai	四季彩	201 series	4	Seating	April 2001	July 2009	201 series	Hachioji, Tokyo	A 4-car 201 series set (W1) was modified in 2001 by JR East to become the special Shikisai (四季彩) tourist train, entering service on the Ōme Line from 4 August 2001. This train featured panorama windows and transverse seating bays on one side of the train only. It was repainted into a new livery in June 2005. The train was withdrawn from regular service at the end of June 2009, with a number of special finale runs scheduled for July.
Irodori	彩	485 series	6	Seating/compartments	December 2006	30 September 2017	485 series	Nagano	
No.Do.Ka	NO・DO・KA	485 series	3	Carpet	October 2001	7 January 2018	183/189 series	Niigata	Formerly Sylphide. Can be diesel-hauled. Cab car uses the same design as that on Panorama Express Alps.
Utage	宴	485 series	4	Tatami	June 1994	23 February 2019	485 series	Oyama	
Hana	華	485 series	6	Tatami	March 1997	30 October 2022	485 series	Oyama	
Resort Express Yū	リゾートエクスプレスゆう	485 series	6	Tatami	March 1991	2 January 2018	183/189 series	Mito	Can be diesel-hauled.
Shuttle Maihama	シャトルマイハマ	165 series	3	Seating	March 1990	December 1995	165 series	Chiba	Converted to become Joyful Train Alpha.
Sylphide	シルフィード	485 series	3	Seating	September 1990	2001	485 series	Niigata	Converted to No.Do.Ka
Yamanami	やまなみ	485 series	4	Tatami	April 1999	2010	485 series	Takasaki	Replaced loco-hauled Kutsurogi set. Intermediate cars combined with Seseragi and rebuilt as Resort Yamadori. End cars rebuilt to form Zipangu.
Kirakira Uetsu	きらきらうえつ	485 series	4	Seating	November 2001	29 September 2019	485 series	Niigata	Replaced by Kairi.
Genbi Shinkansen	現美新幹線	E3-700 series	6	Seating	2016	19 December 2020	E3 series Shinkansen	Niigata	
Toreiyu	とれいゆ	E3-700 series	6	Seating (car 11), ozashiki (cars 12 to 14), lounge (car 15), ashiyu foot baths (car 16)	2014	6 March 2022	E3 Series Shinkansen	Yamagata	Operations ended in March 2022, with its retirement likely spurred by a decline in ridership caused by COVID-19 restrictions.

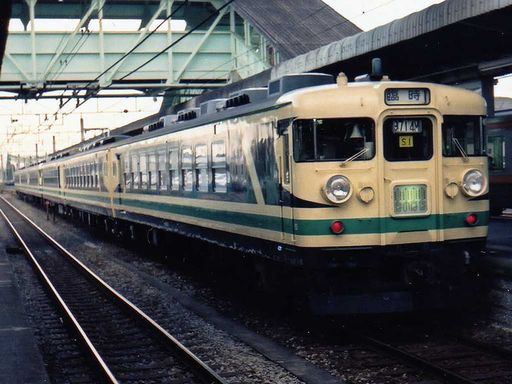
Nanohana 165 series EMU, 1990

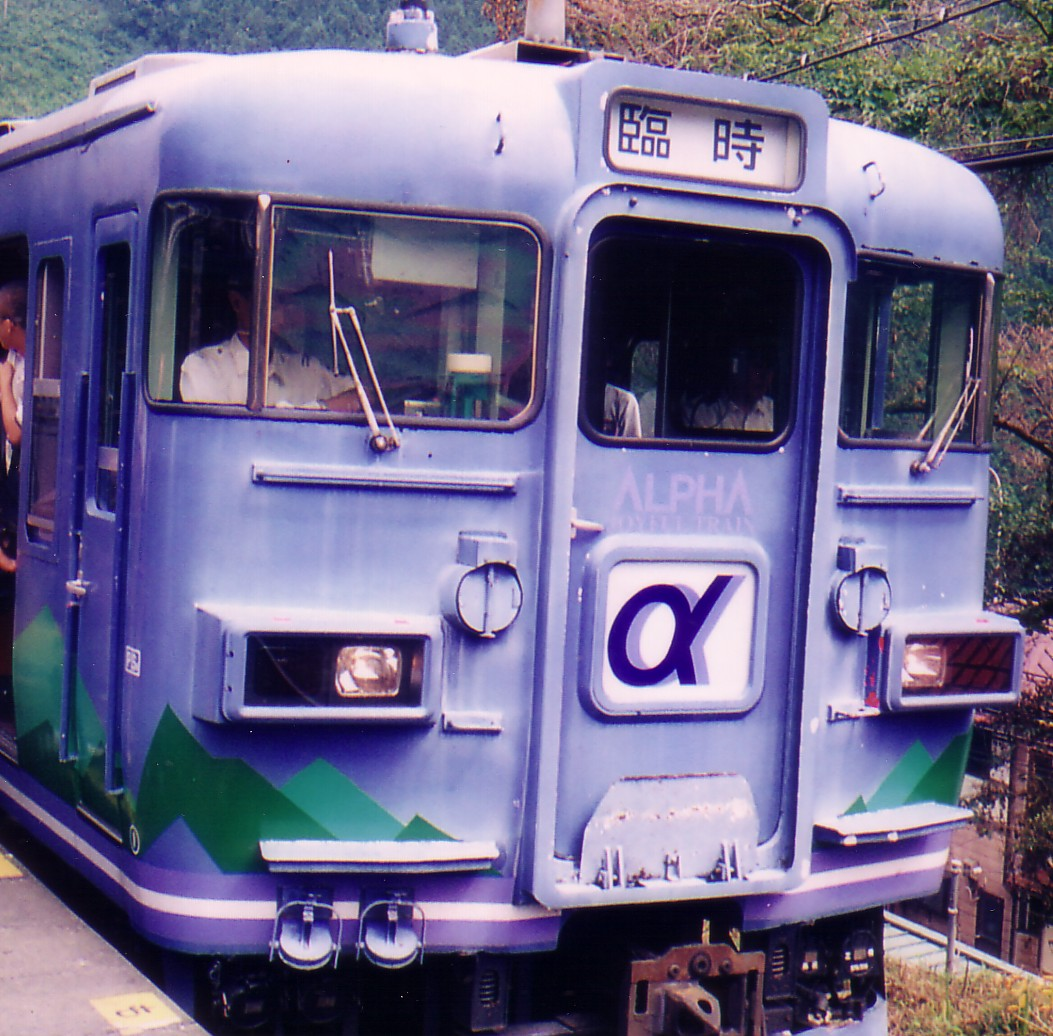
Joyful Train Alpha

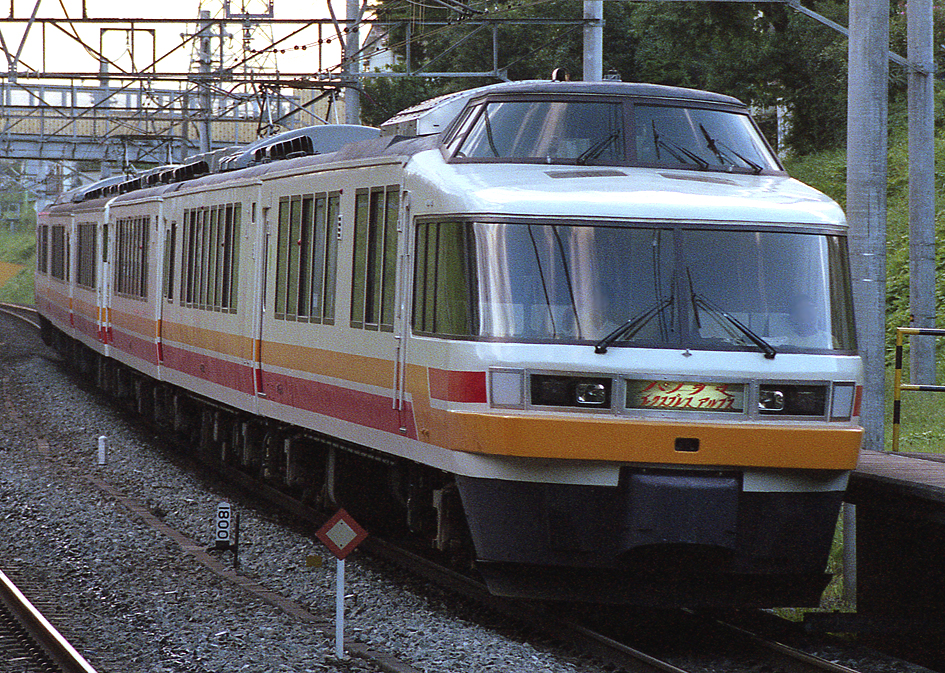
Panorama Express Alps 165 series EMU, 1990

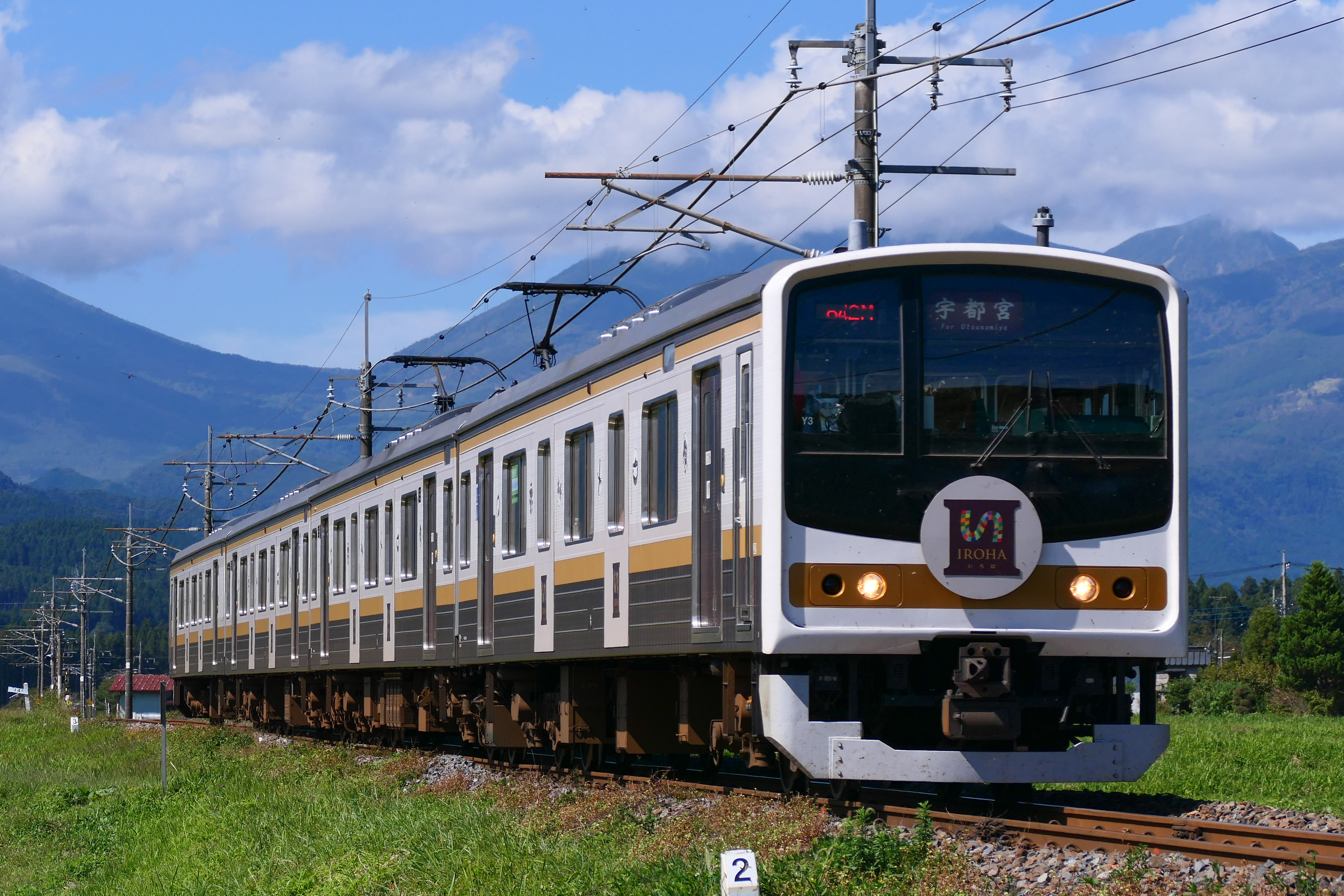
Iroha 205-600 series EMU, October 2019

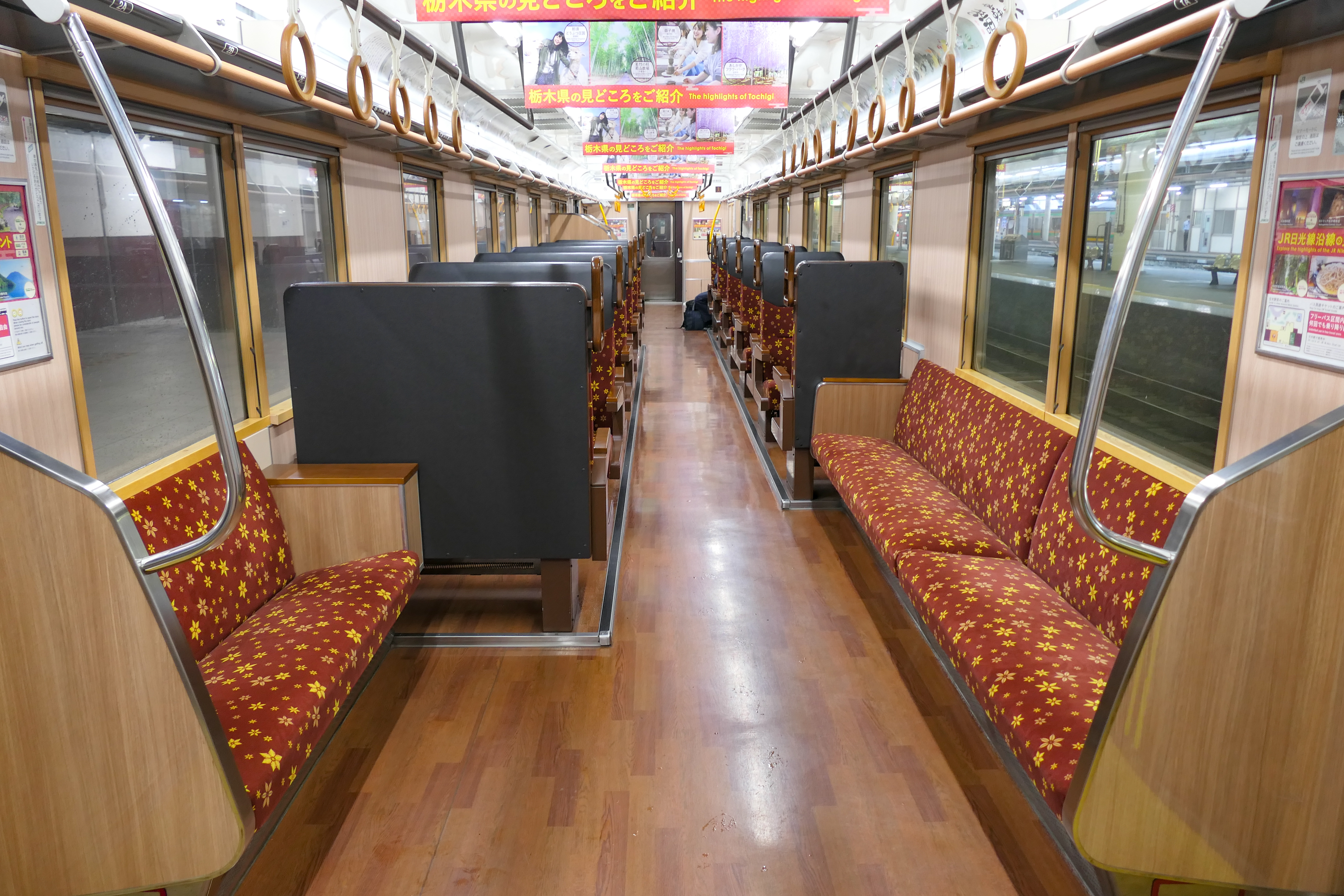
Interior of 205-600 series Iroha

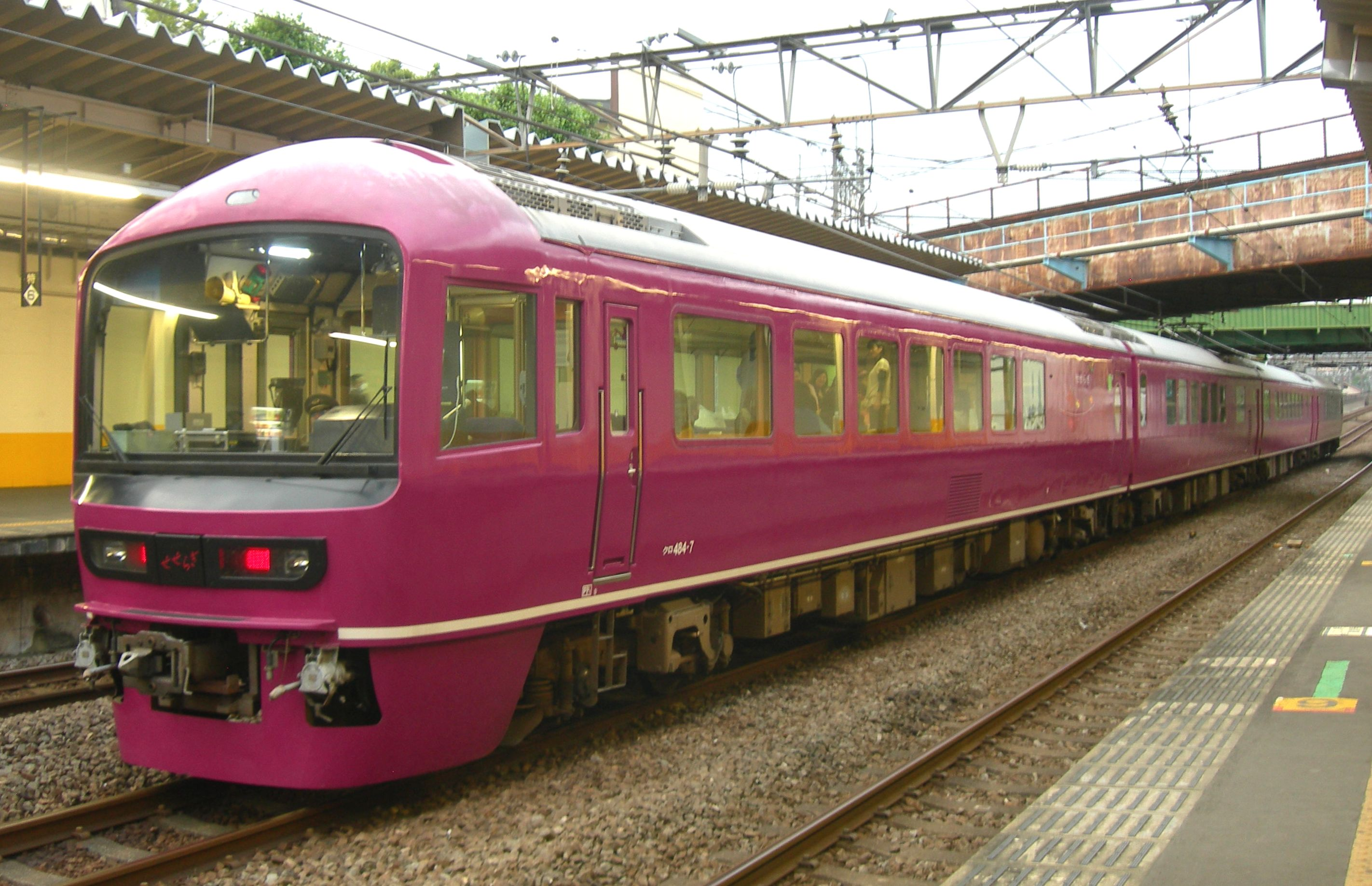
Seseragi 485 series EMU, May 2009

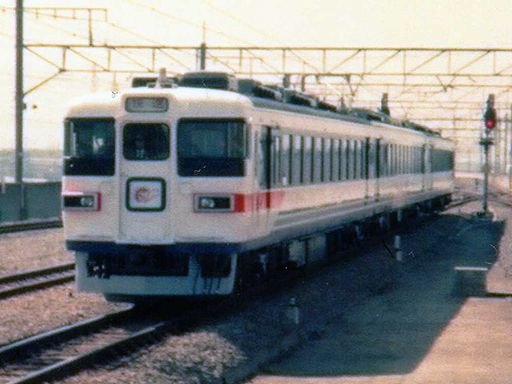
Shuttle Maihama 165 series EMU, 1990

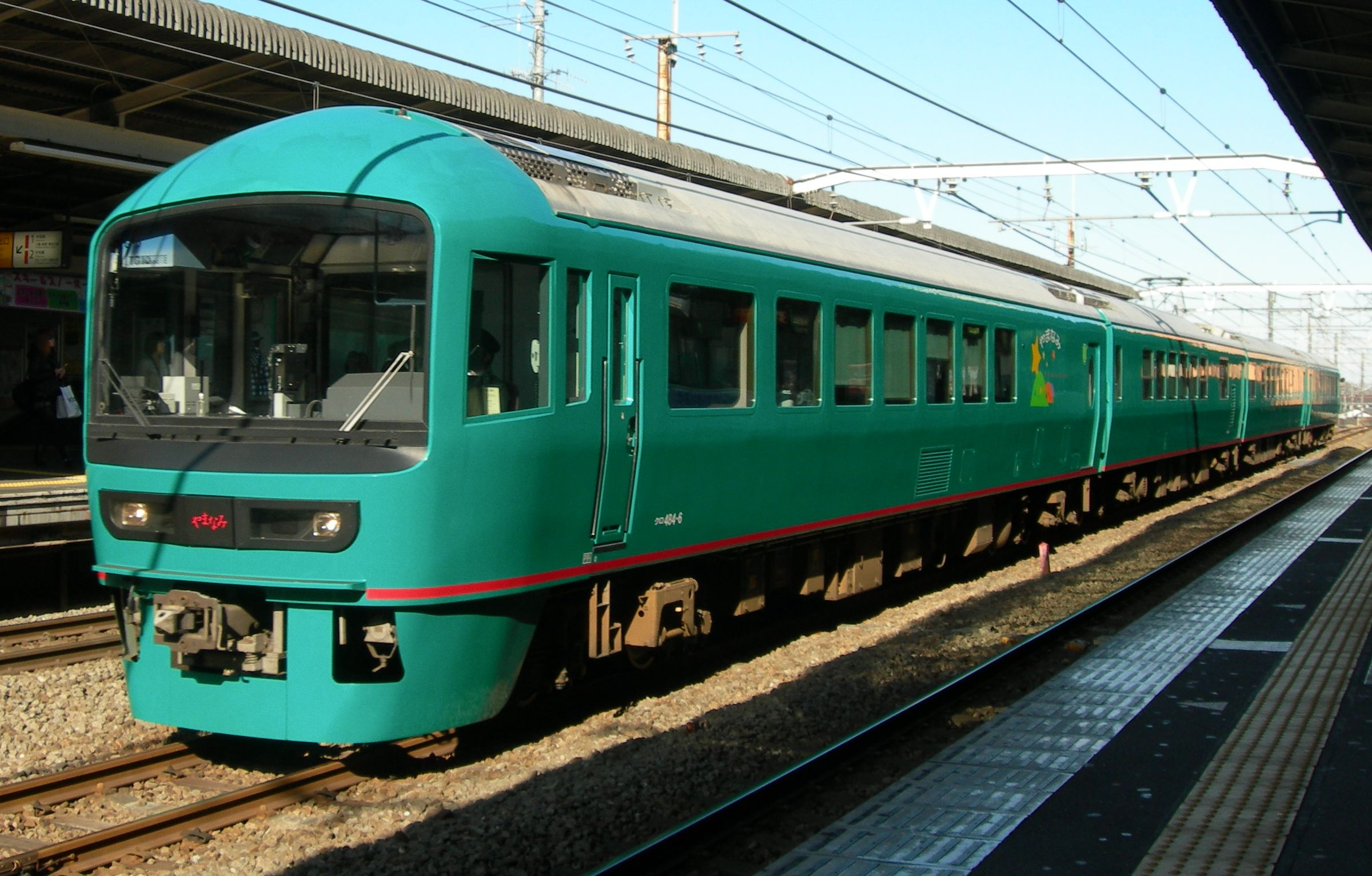
Yamanami, January 2010

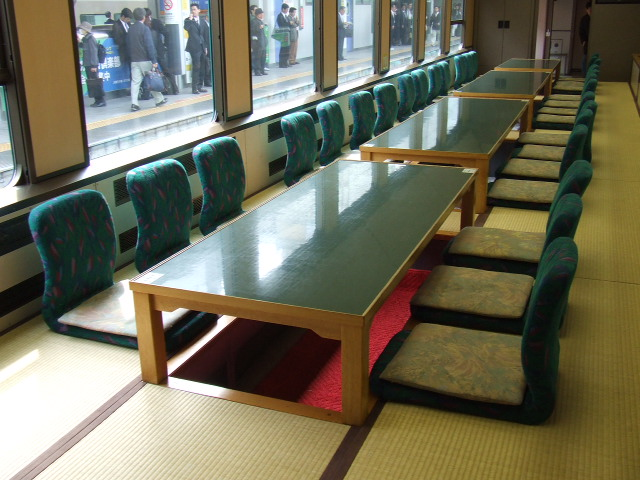
Interior of 485 series Yamanami

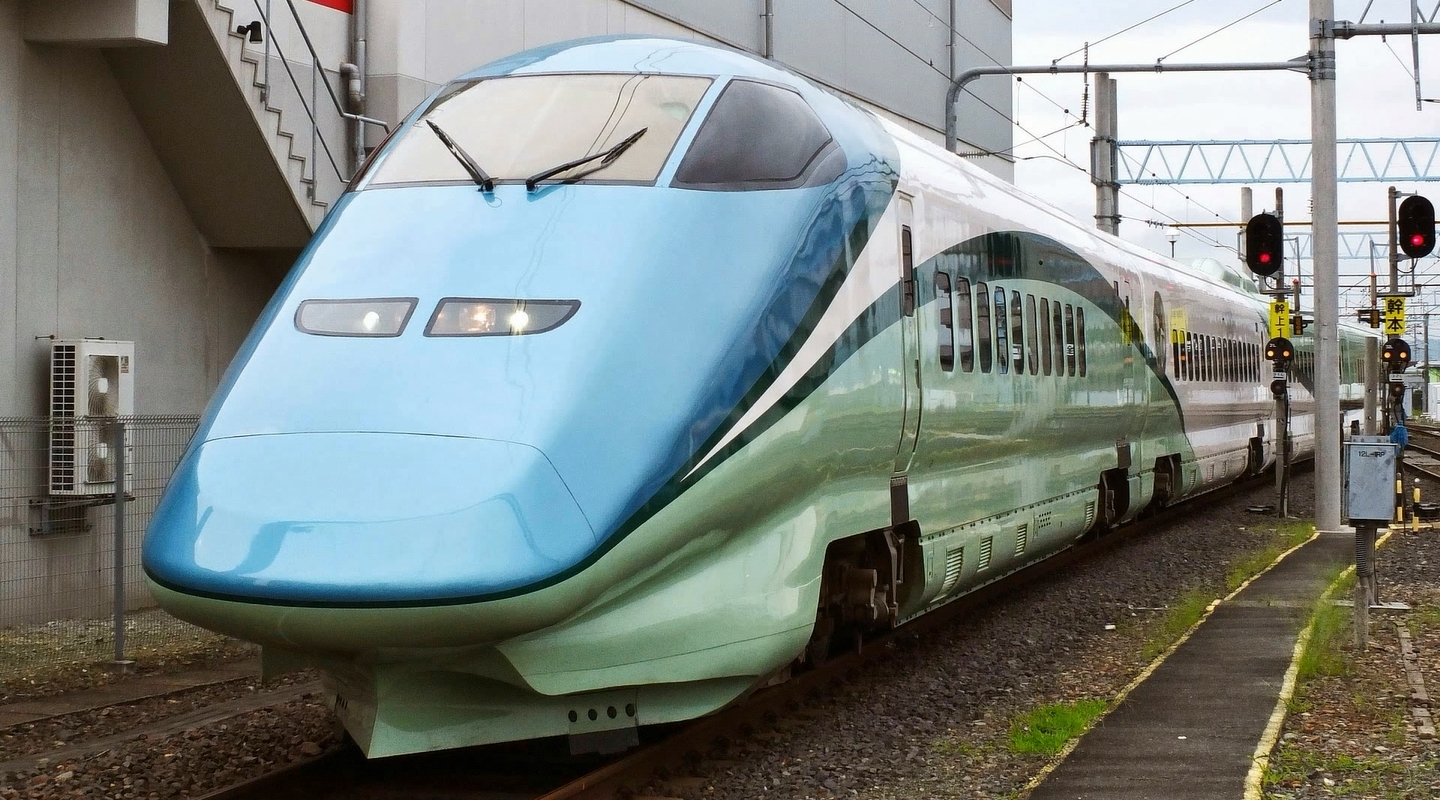
E3-700 R18 Toreiyu, July 2014

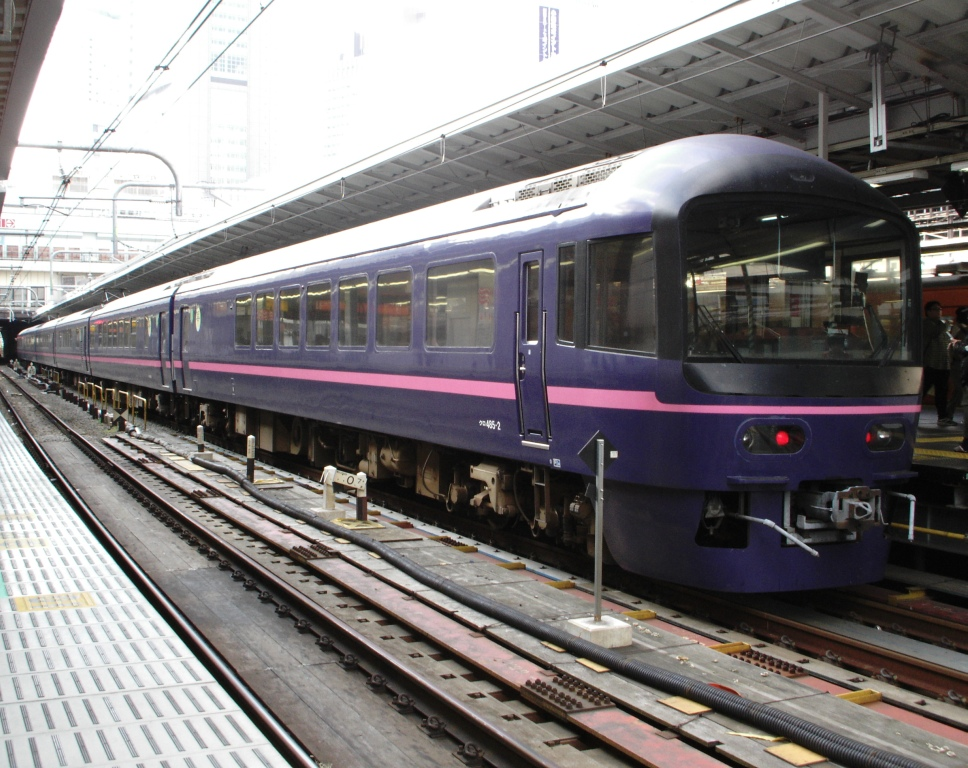
Hana, October 2006

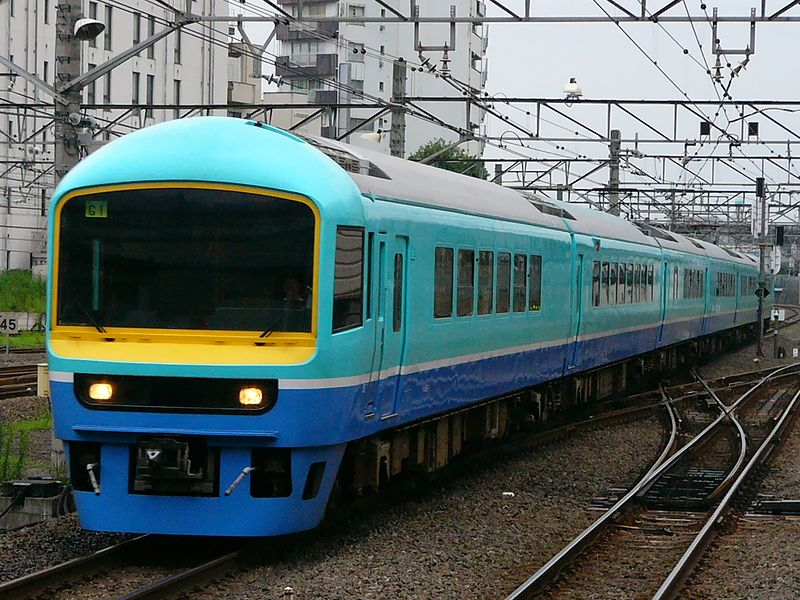
New Nanohana, July 2003

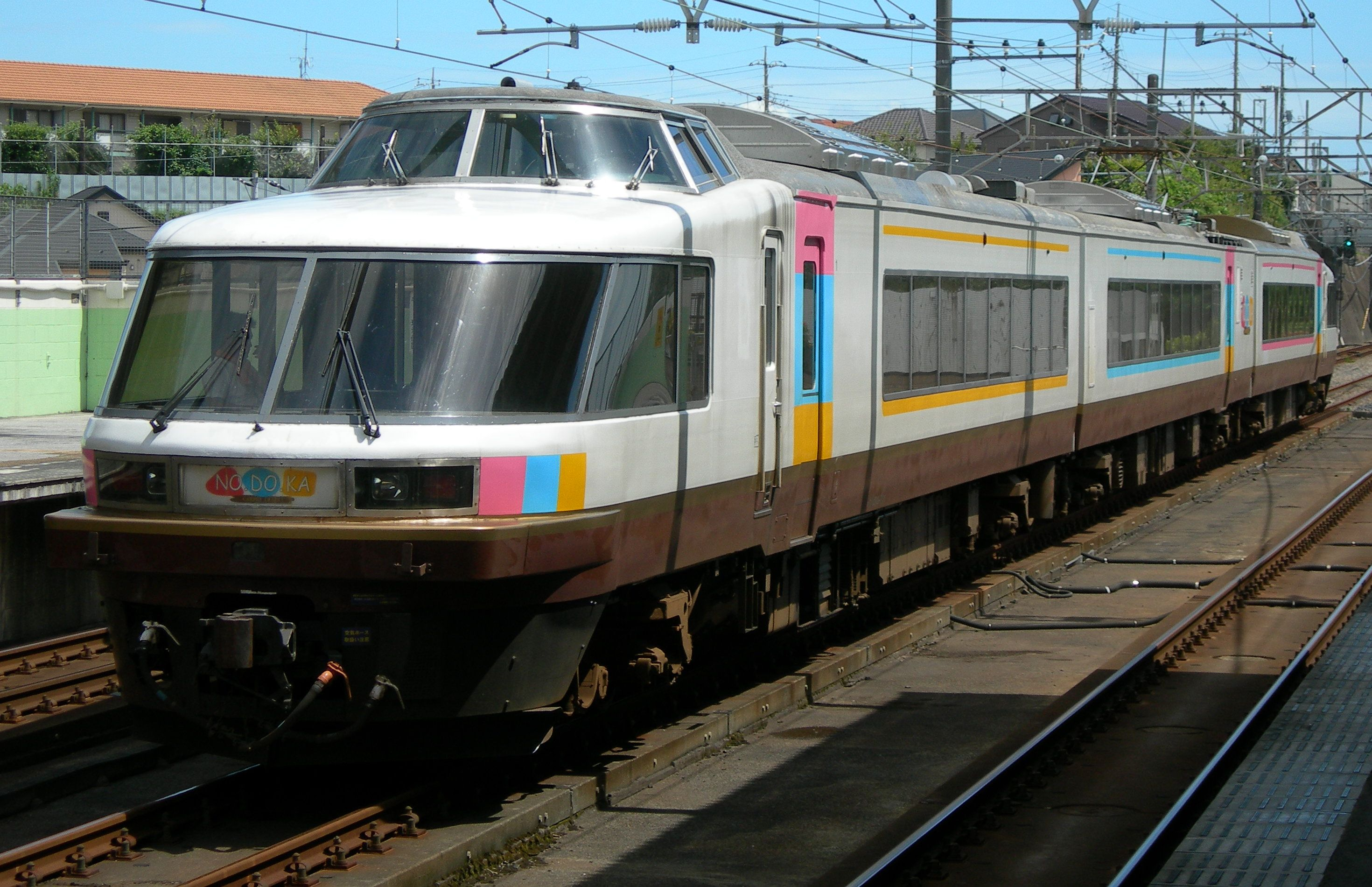
Nodoka, August 2009

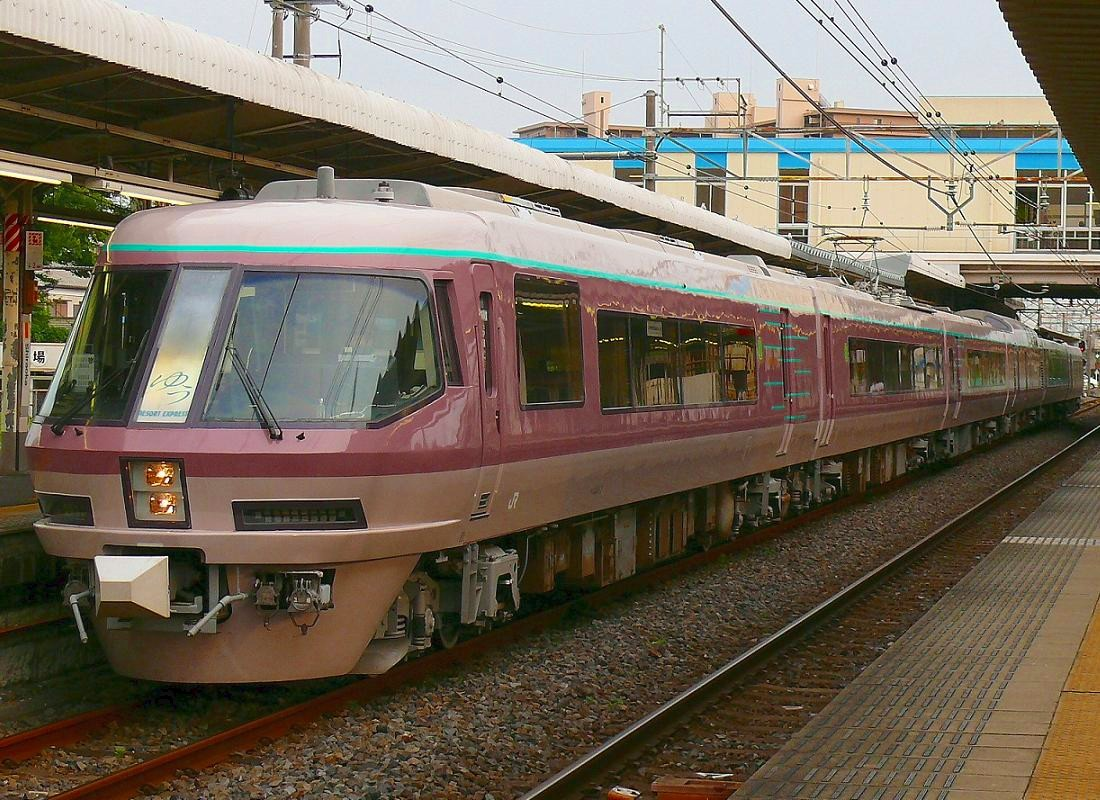
Resort Express Yū, May 2006

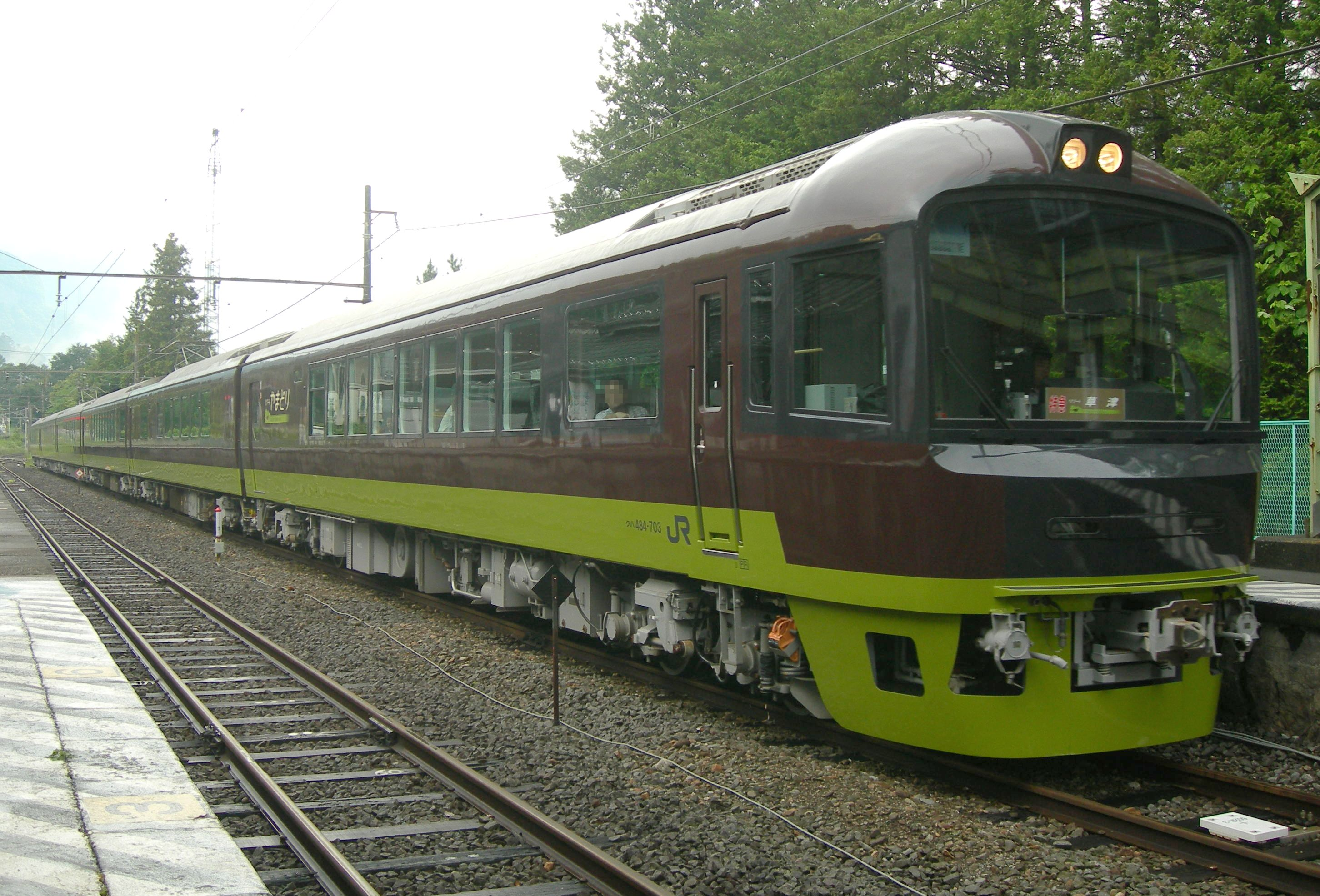
Resort Yamadori, July 2011

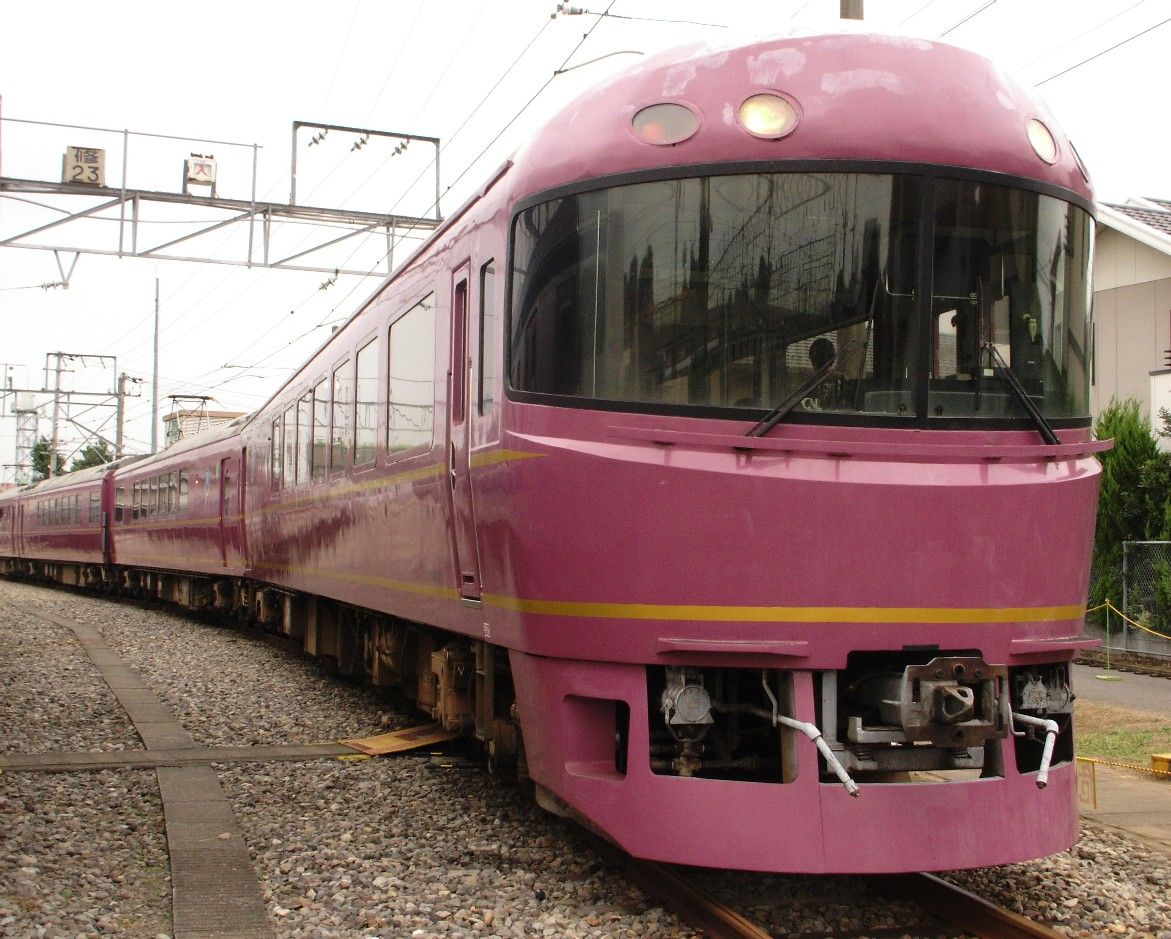
Utage, September 2006

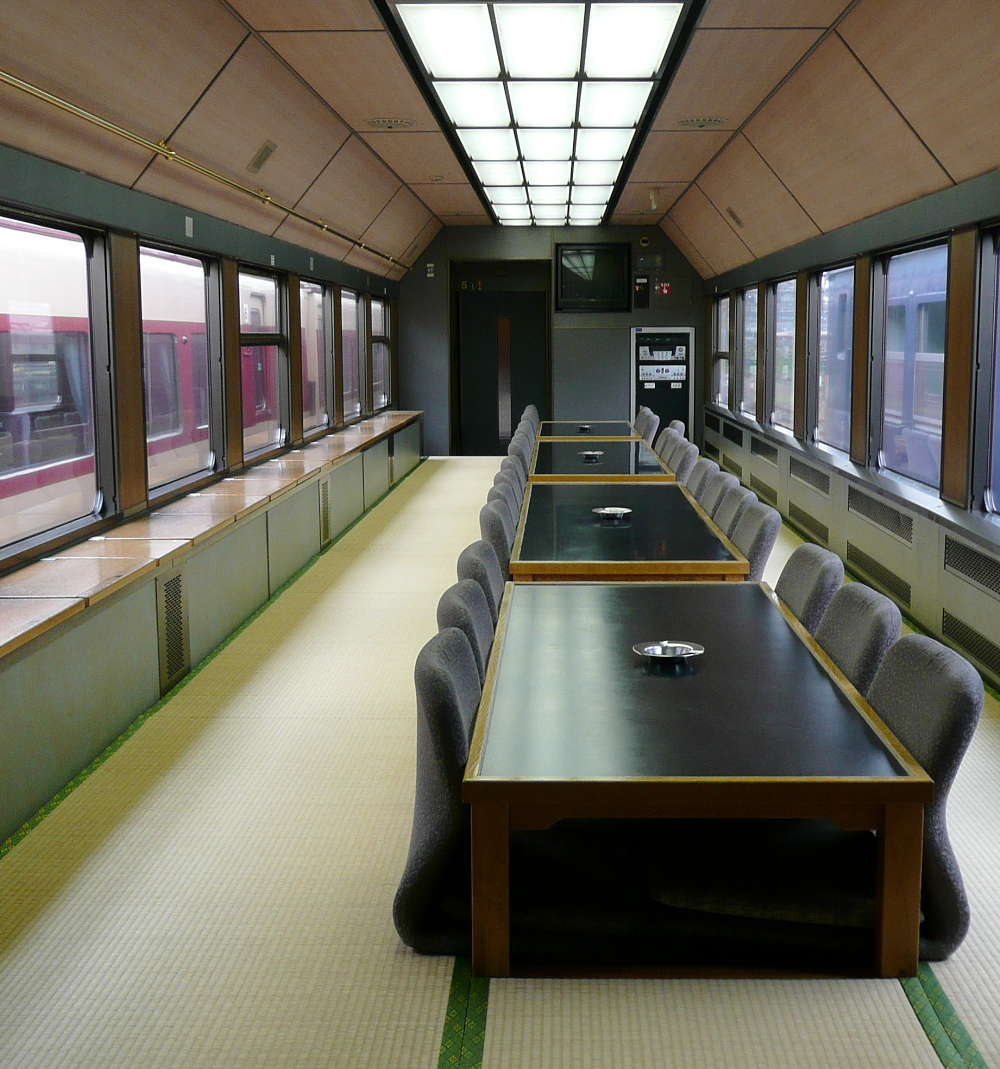
Interior of 485 series Utage

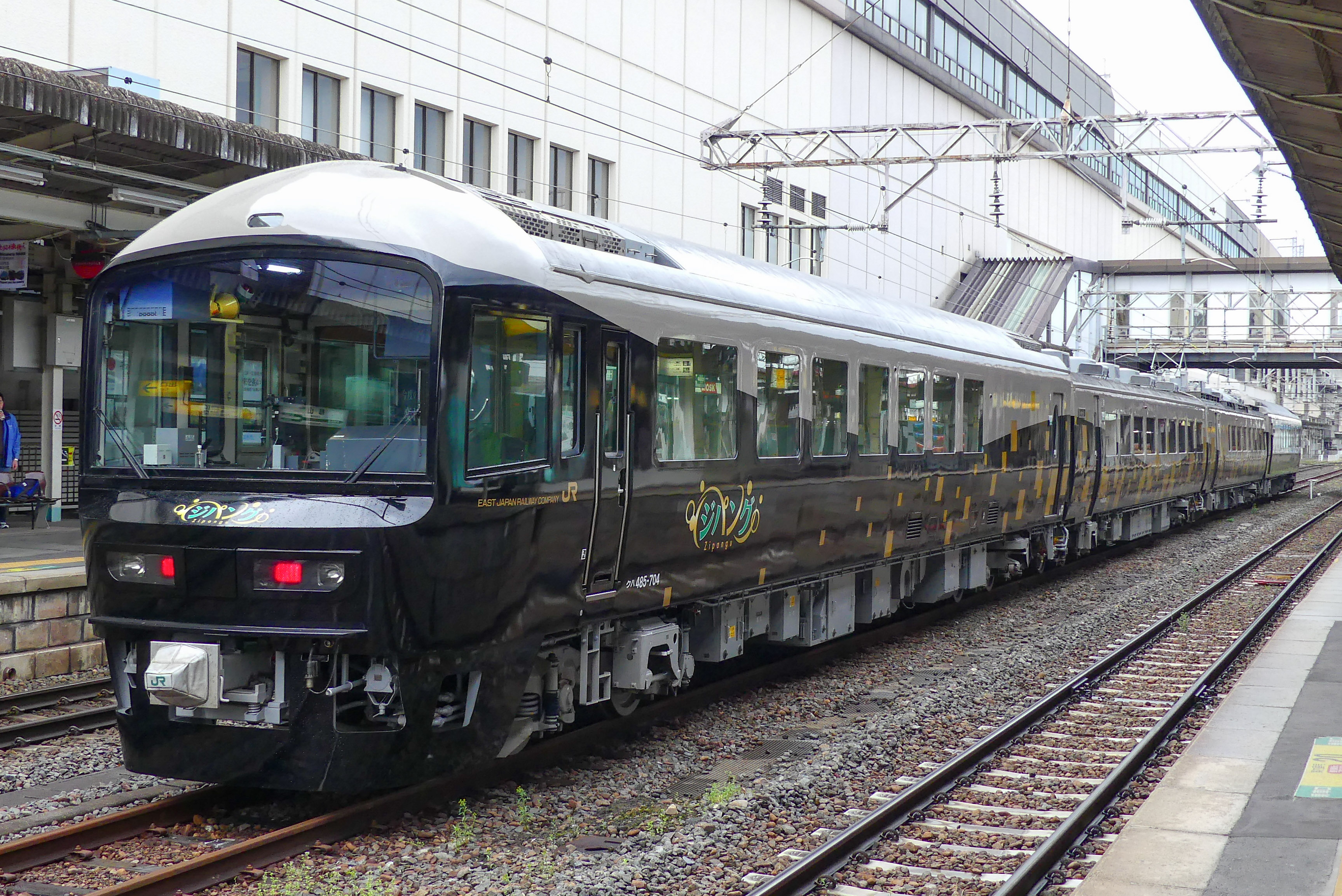
Zipangu, April 2017

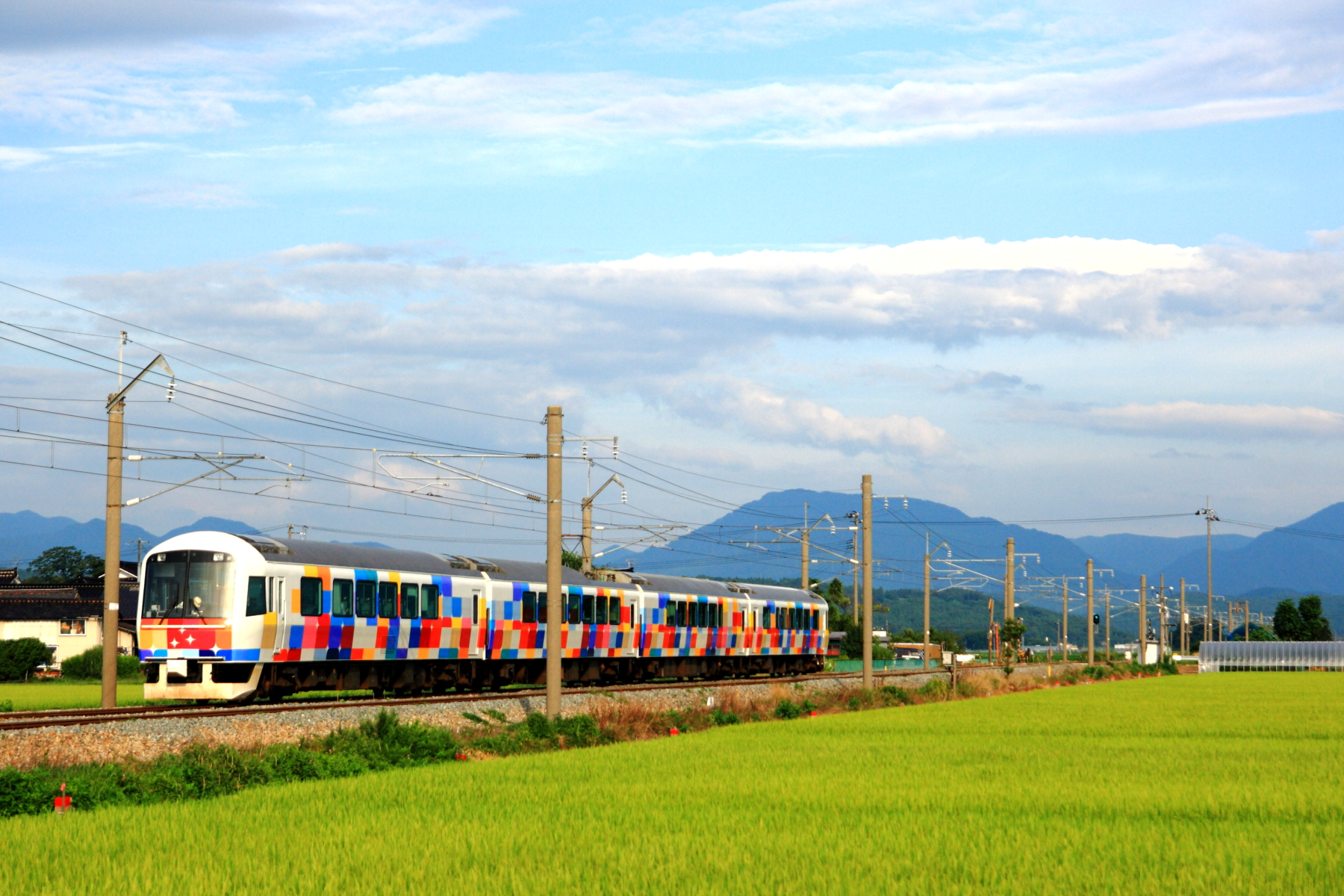
Kirakira Uetsu, 2012

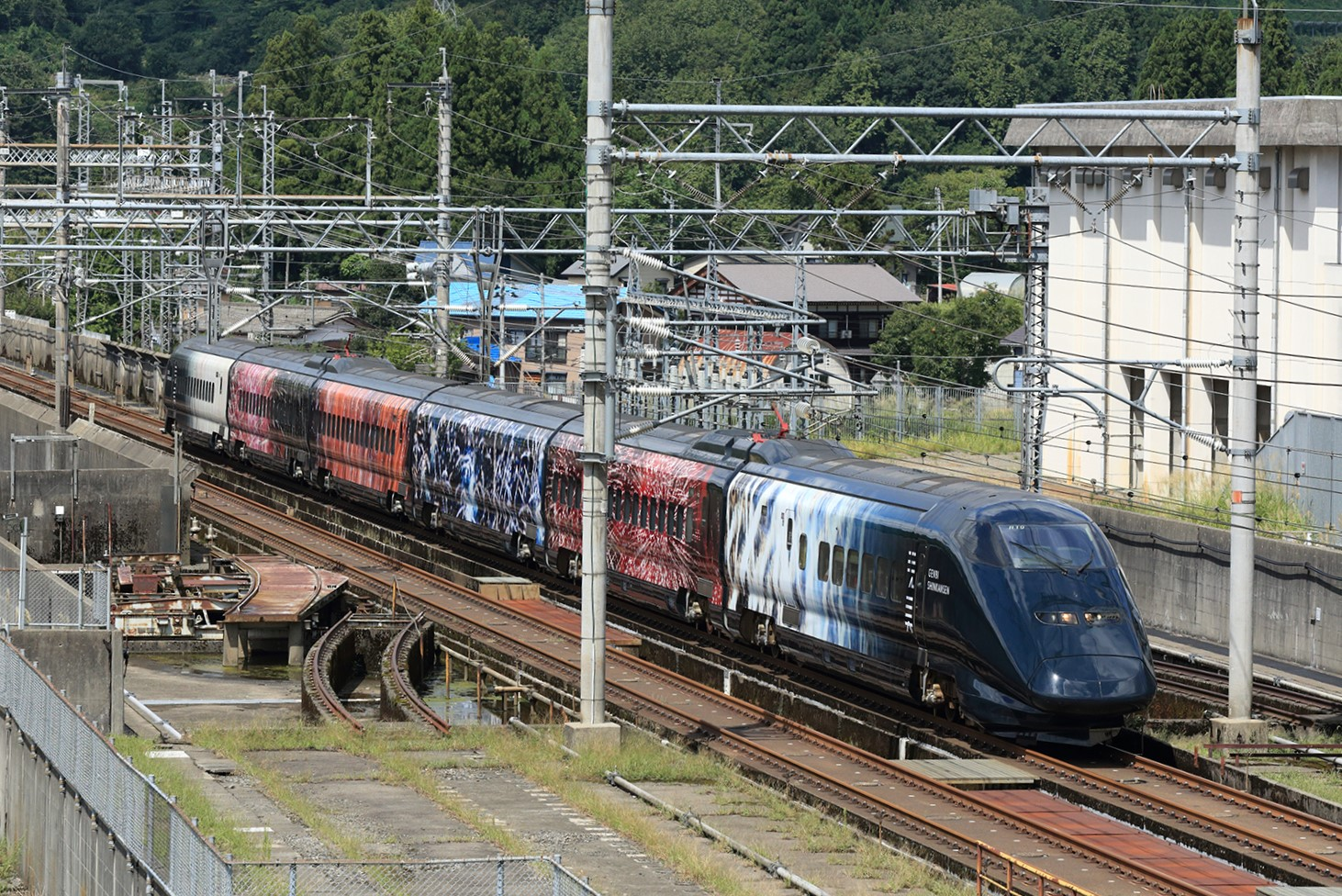
Genbi Shinkansen, 2016

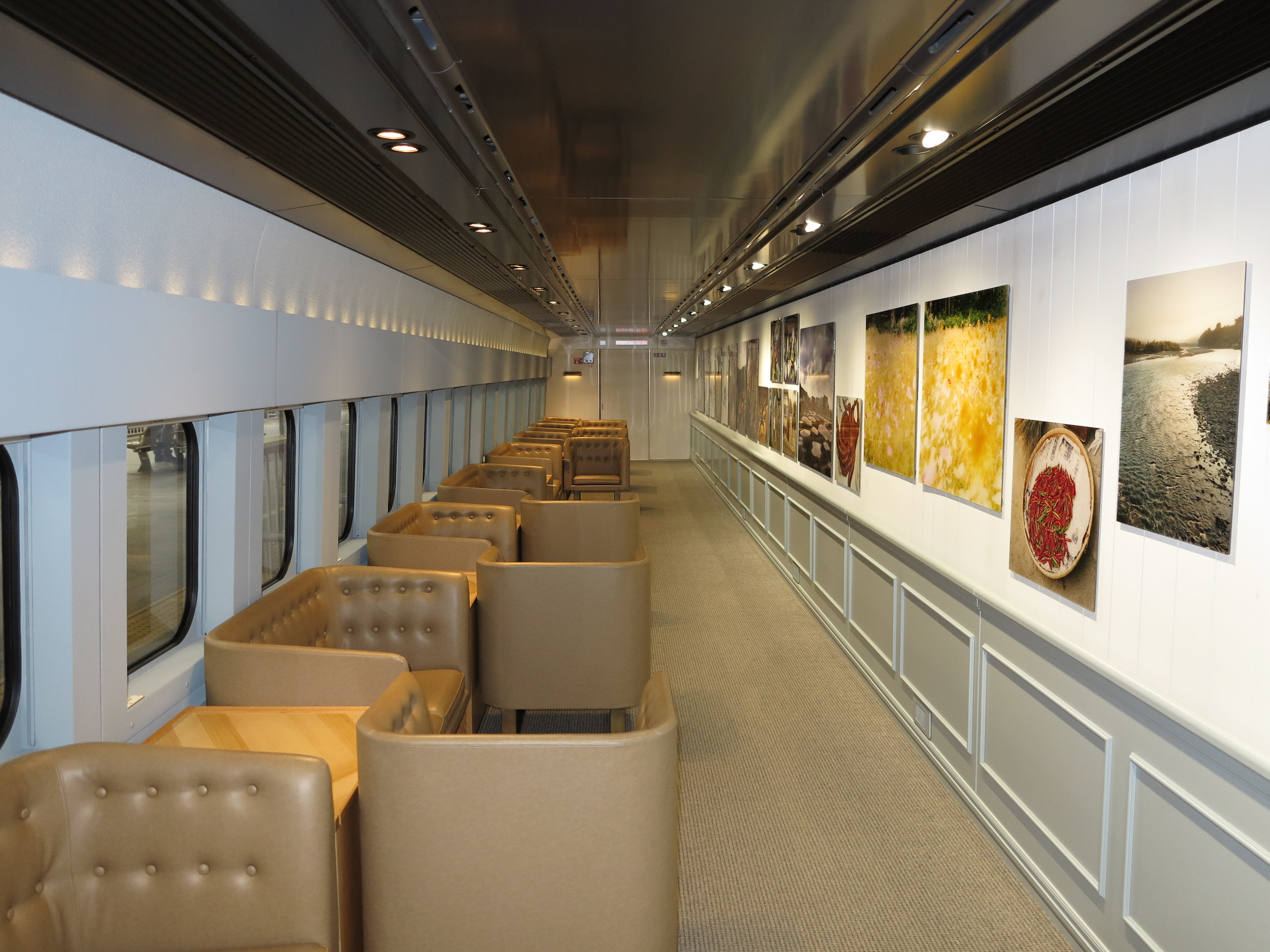
Interior of E3 series Genbi Shinkansen

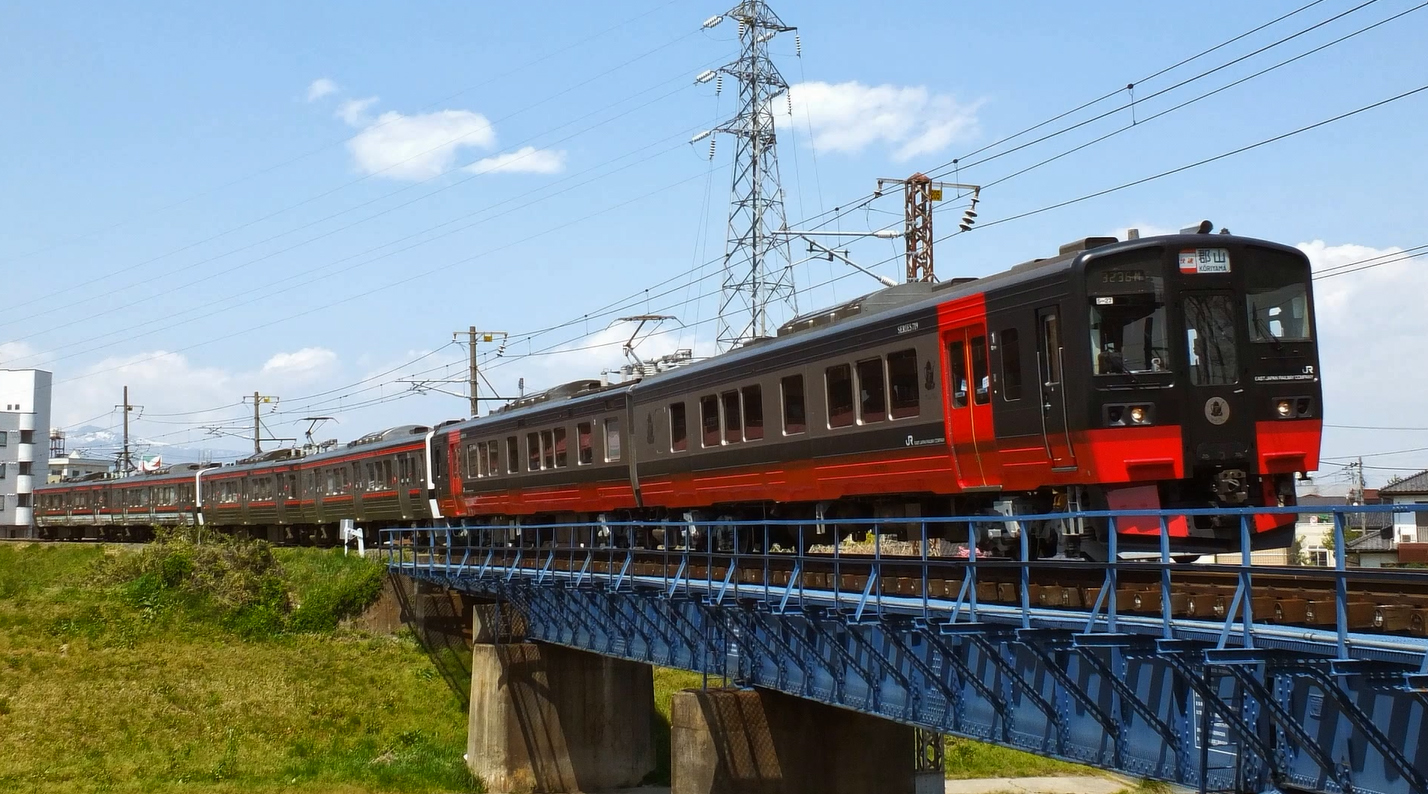
Fruitea Fukushima, April 2015

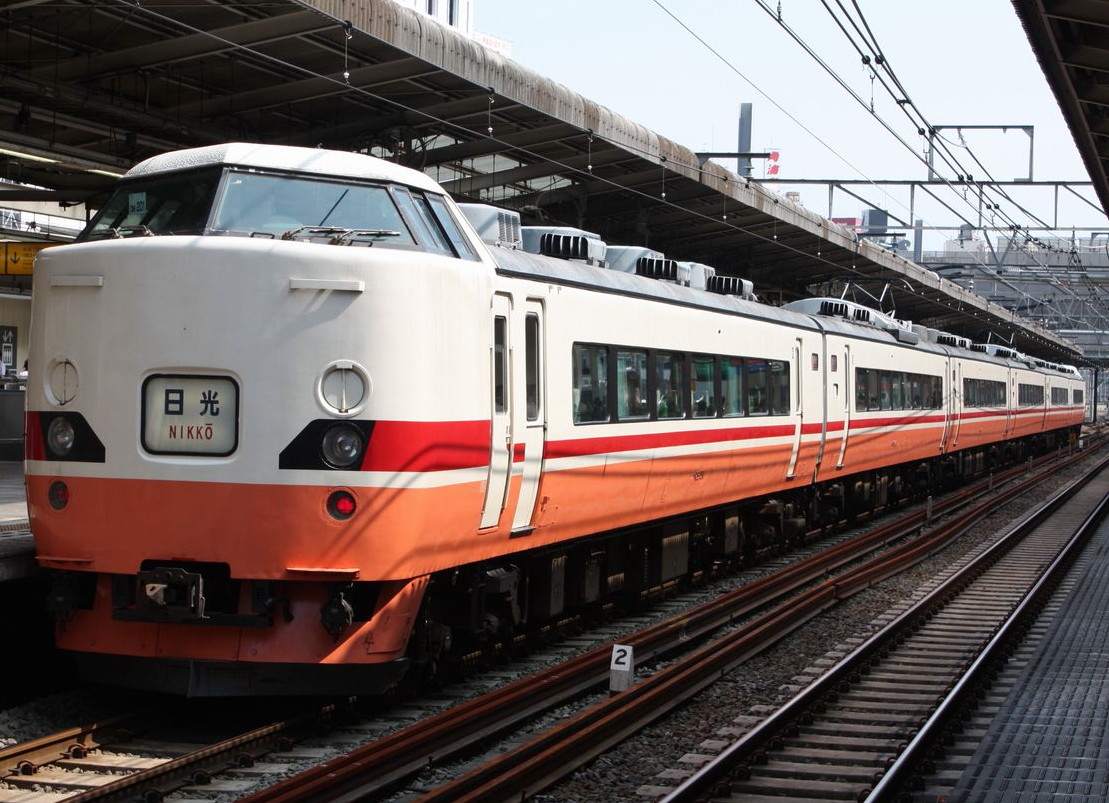
Ayano running a Nikkō Limited Express service

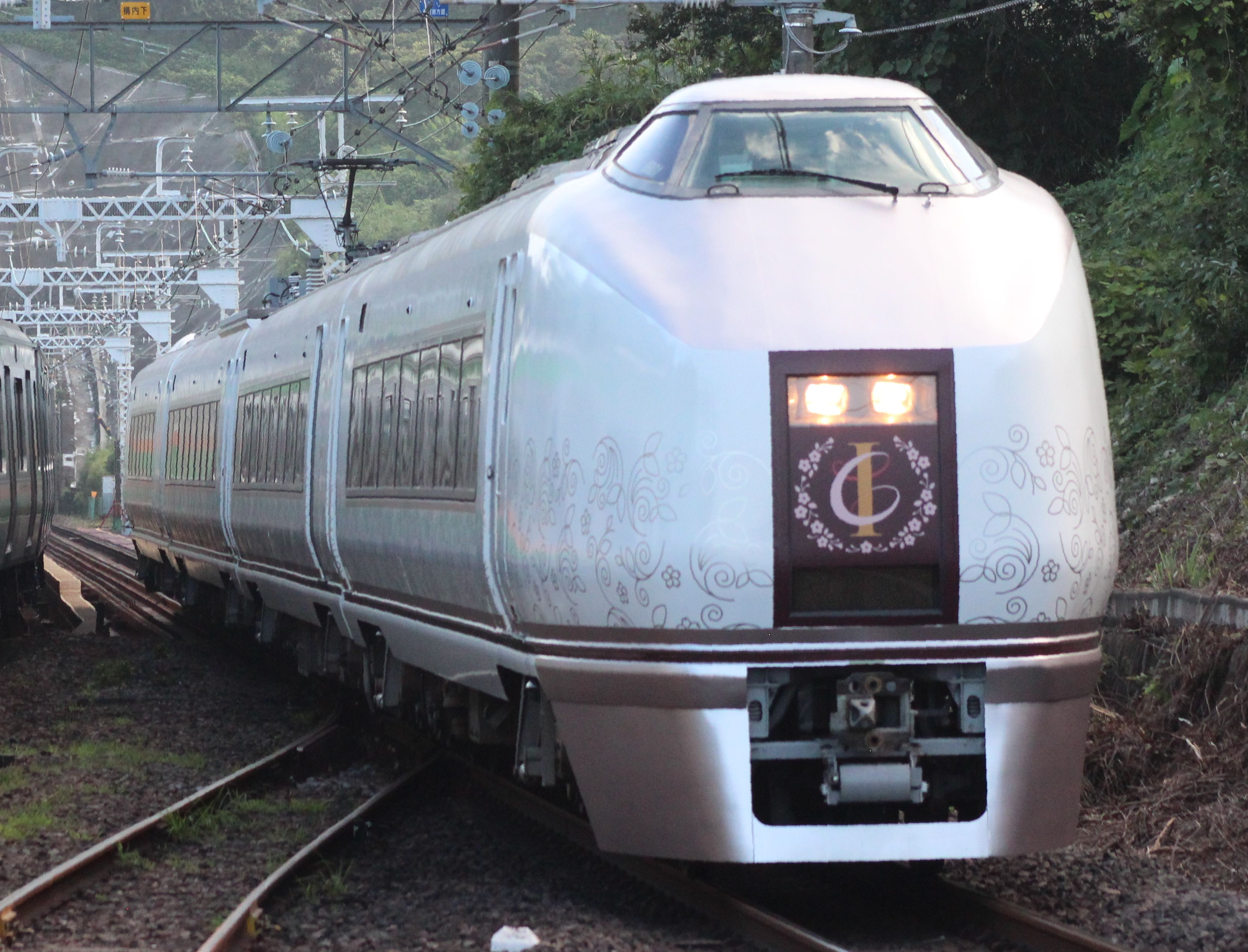
IZU CRAILE, 2016

==== DMU ====
Name	Japanese	Classification	No. of cars	Accommodation	Introduced	Withdrawn	Converted from	Depot/region	Remarks
Furusato	ふるさと	KiHa 48-2500	3	Seating	April 2001	August 2016	KiHa 48	Sendai	Converted from former Manyū set.
Kogane	こがね	KiHa 59	3	Seating	July 2003	July 2011	KiHa 58 series	Sendai	Converted from former Gracia set. Shipped to Philippines August 2011.
Resort Minori	リゾートみのり	KiHa 48	3	Seating	October 2008	August 2020	KiHa 48 series	Sendai	
Kirakira Michinoku	きらきらみちのく	KiHa 48	3	Seating	July 2002	November 2010	KiHa 48 series	Aomori	Converted into Resort Umineko
Resort Umineko	リゾートうみねこ	KiHa 48	3	Seating	April 2011	March 2020	KiHa 48 series	Iwate	Converted from Kirakira Michinoku.
Umineko	うみねこ	KiHa 48	2	Seating	2006	2011	KiHa 48 series	Iwate	Replaced by Resort Umineko. Train remained in use without Umineko badging till 2017.
Resort Asunaro	リゾートあすなろ	HB-E300	2	Seating	December 2010	August 2023	Purpose-Built	Aomori	2 sets in total. Converted to Hinabi and Satono.
Elegance Acky	エレガンスアッキー	KiHa 59	3	Seating	1985	1997	KiHa 28/58	Akita	Formerly operated by JNR.
Cruising Train	クルージングトレイン	KiHa 48	2	Seating	2011	2023	KiHa 48	Akita	Formerly Resort Shirakami "Aoike" (Replaced by HB-E300, Initially 4 cars).
Akita Cruise Train	あきたクルーズ号	KiHa 48	4	Seating	2010	2020	KiHa 48	Akita	Formerly Resort Shirakami "Buna" (Replaced by HB-E300). Exclusively operated between Akita and Akita Port for passengers of cruise ships calling there. In 2020, the train was replaced by non-dedicated GV-E400 series trains.
Salon Express Arcadia	サロンエクスプレスアルカディア	KiHa 58 series	3	Seating	1981	1988	KiHa 58/28 series	Niigata	Formerly 2 cars, central car added in 1985. Destroyed by fire in 1988. End cars repaired and used as spectator transport for 1992's Sanriku Expo, then rebuilt as Kenji.
Kenji	Kenji	KiHa 58 series	3	Seating	2002	September 2018	KiHa 58/28 series	Morioka	End cars converted from former Salon Express Arcadia set. Last KiHa 58 series train operated by JR East.
Obako	おばこ	KiHa 58 series	3	Tatami	1984	2004	KiHa 58 series	Akita	Formerly known as Komachi from 1991 until 1997, when the Komachi name was given to the Shinkansen service.
Edelweiss	エーデルワイス	KiHa 58 series	3	Seating	1988	2002	KiHa 58 series	Morioka	
Carpet Car	カーペット車	KiHa 58 series	4	Carpet	1985	2002	KiHa 58 series	Niigata	Replaced by Nodoka in 2002

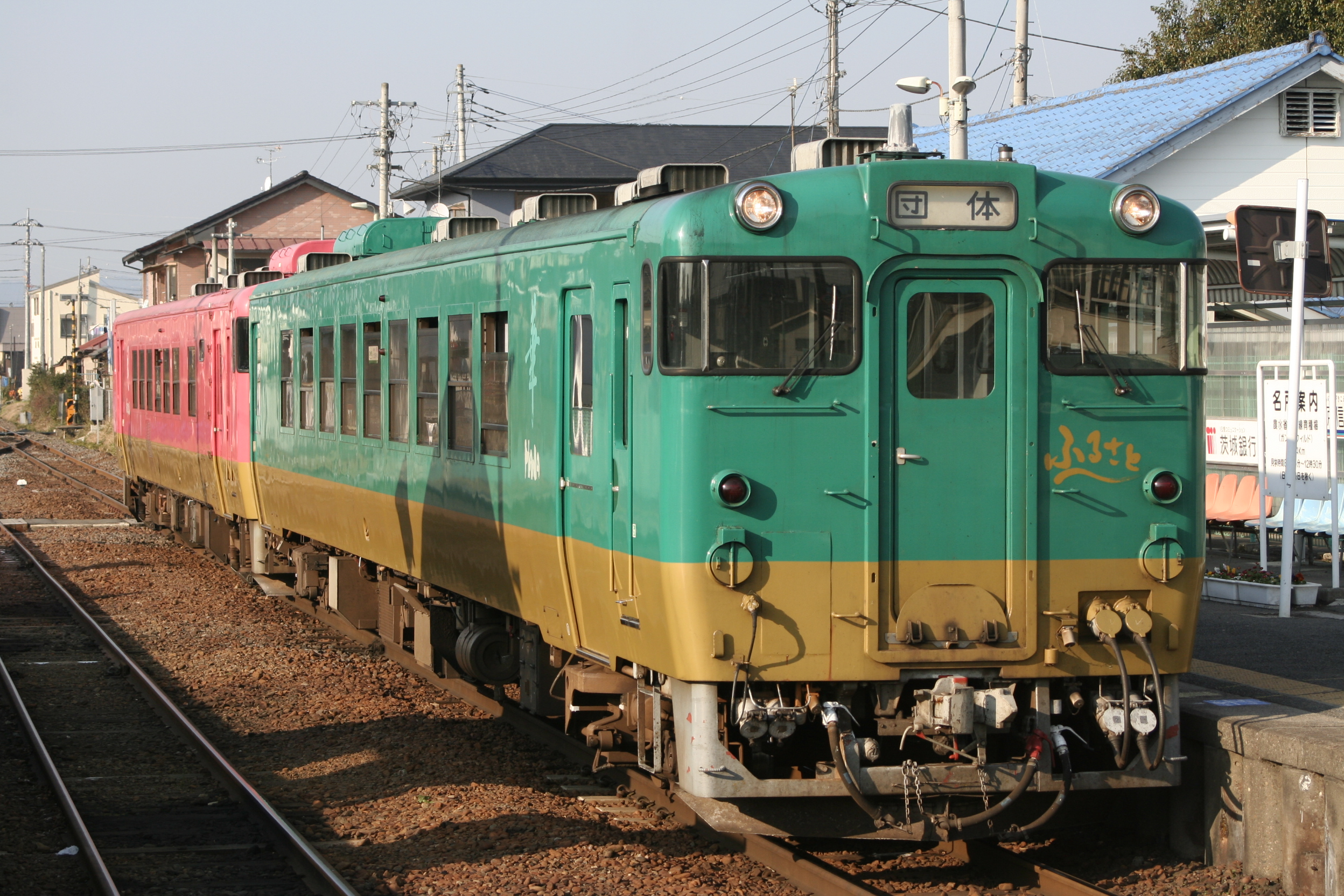
KiHa 48 Furusato operating as a 2-car formation in November 2007

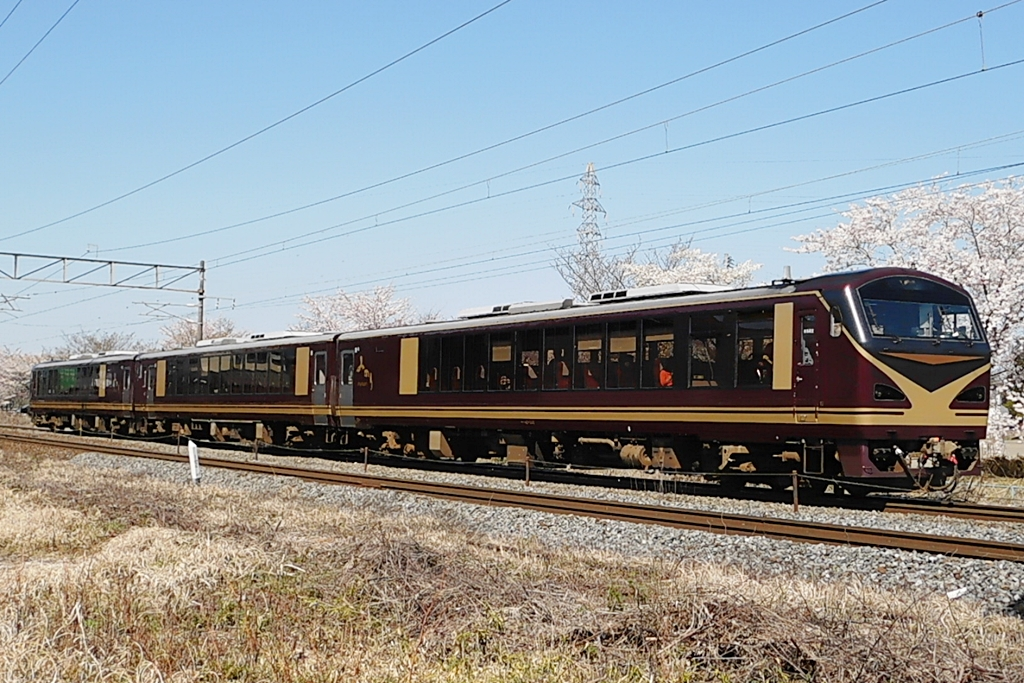
Resort Minori, April 2020

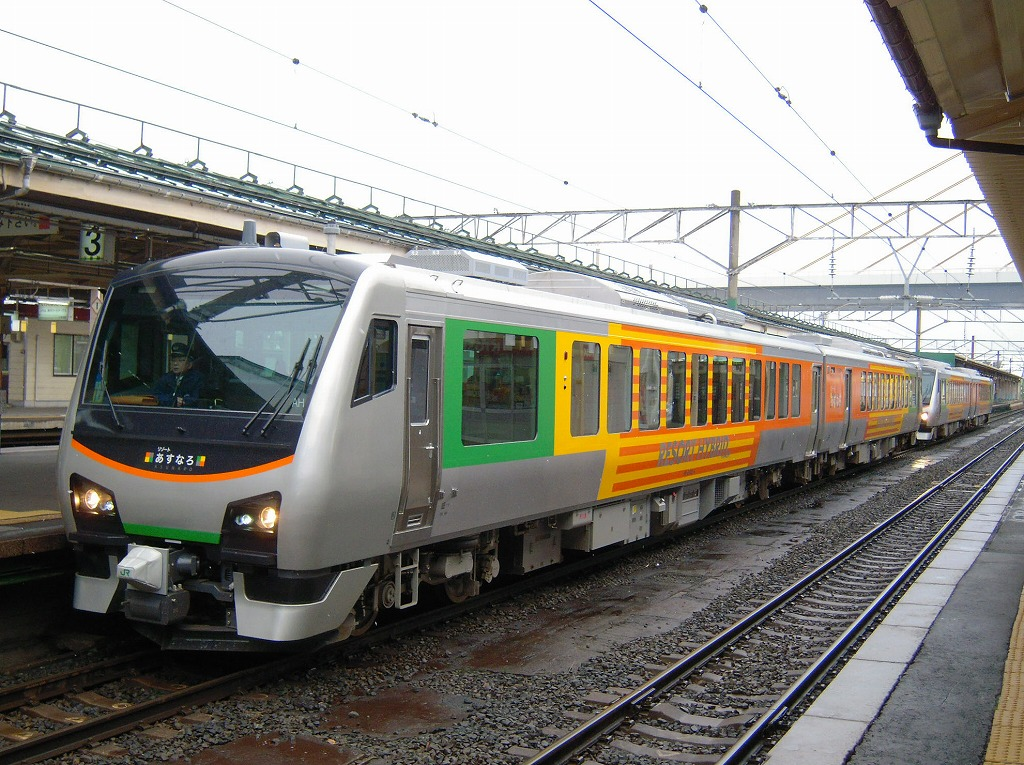
The two Resort Asunaro sets in December 2010

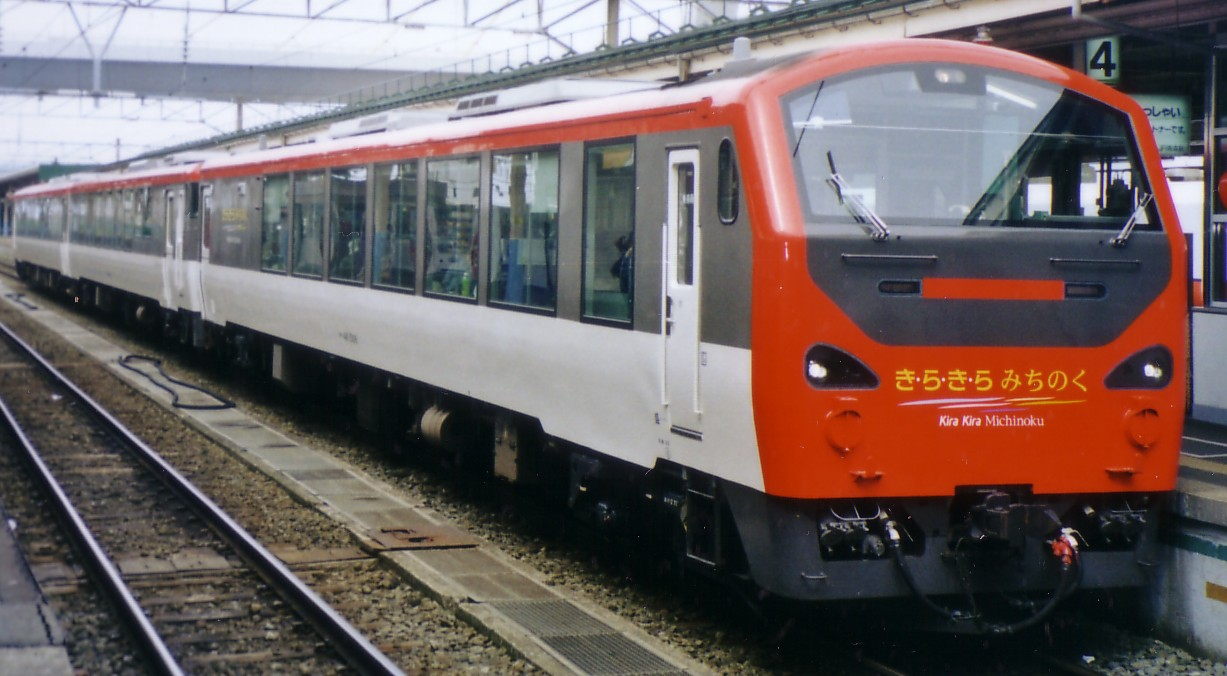
Kirakira Michinoku

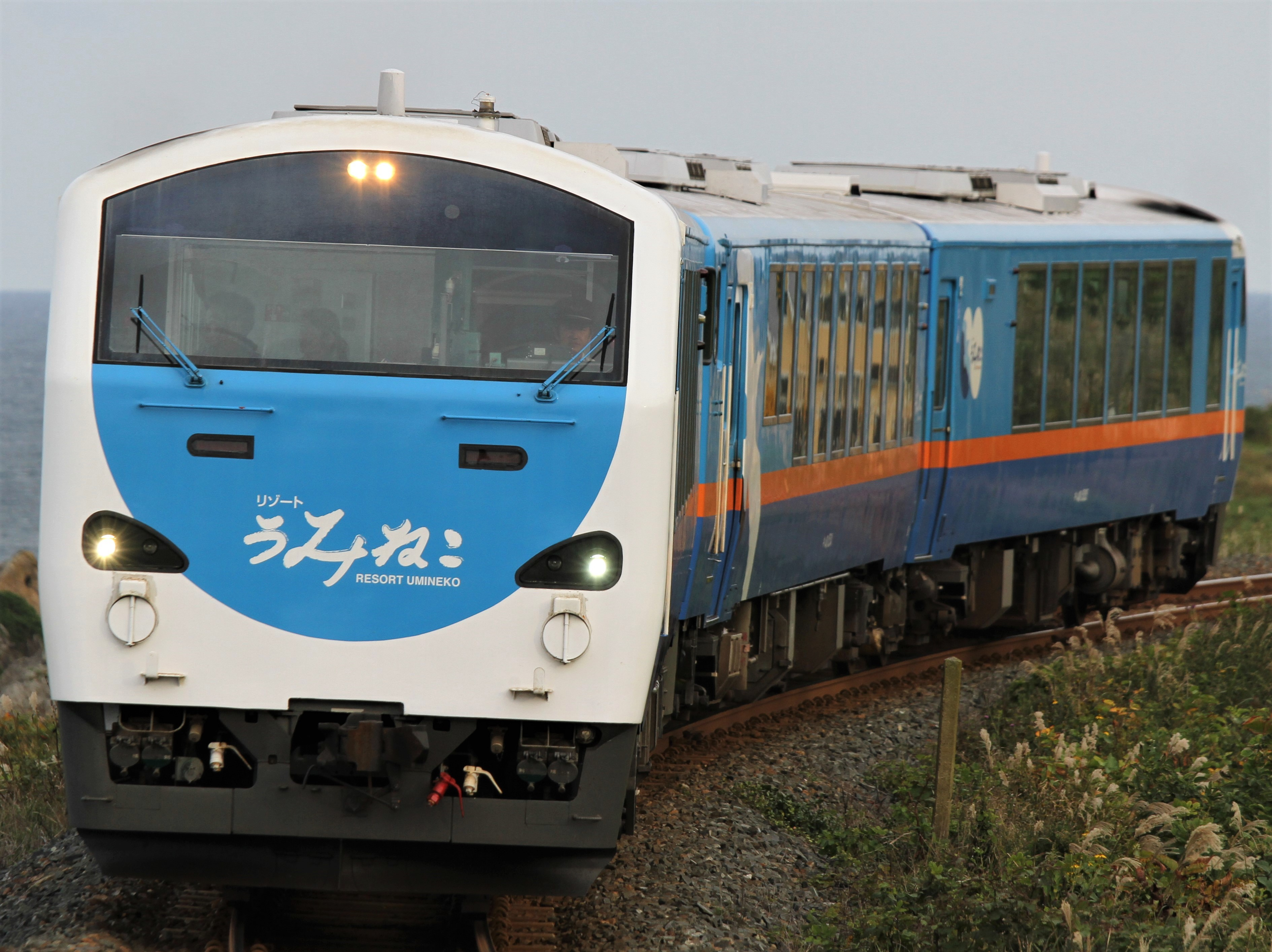
Resort Umineko

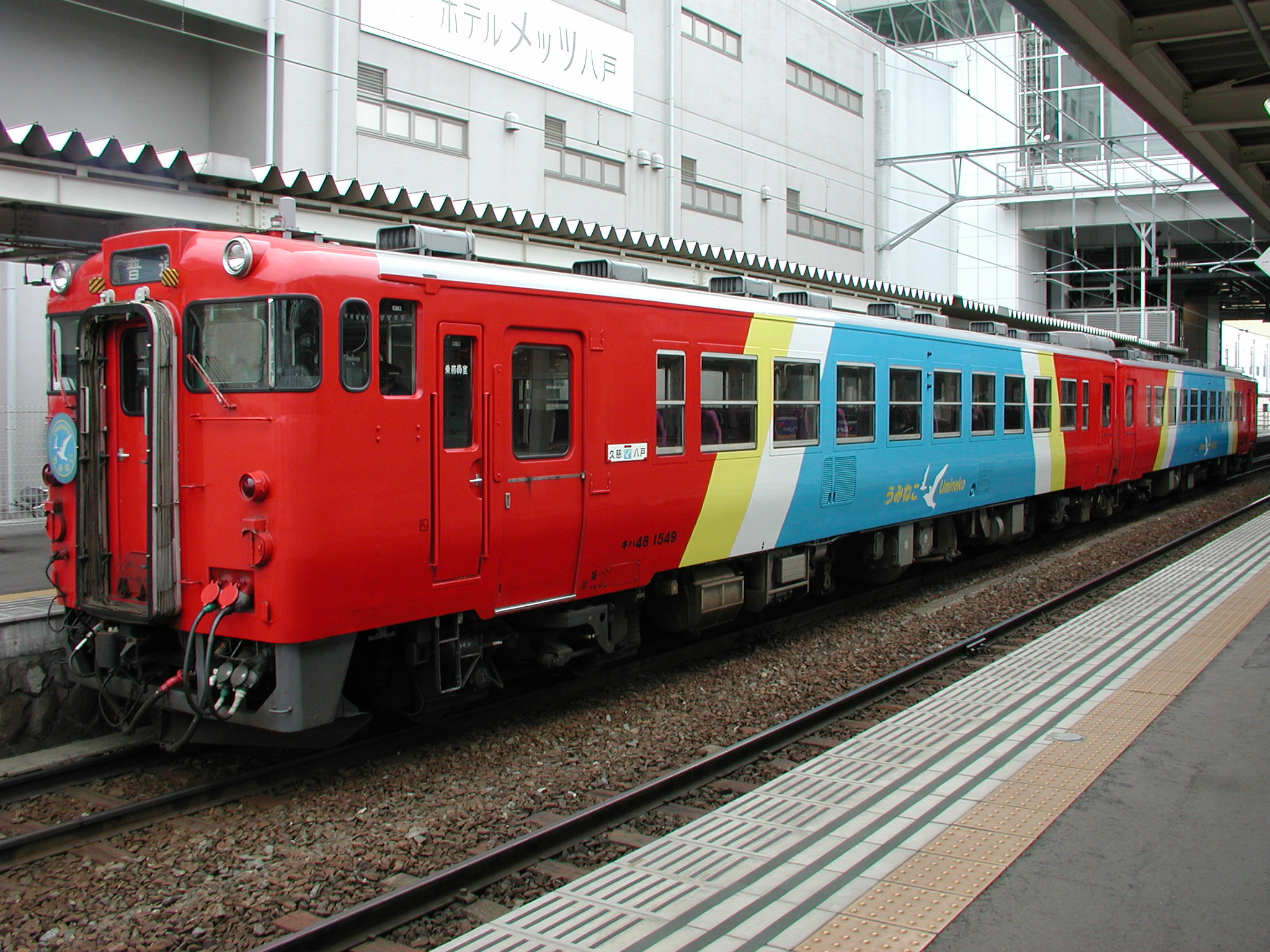
Umineko

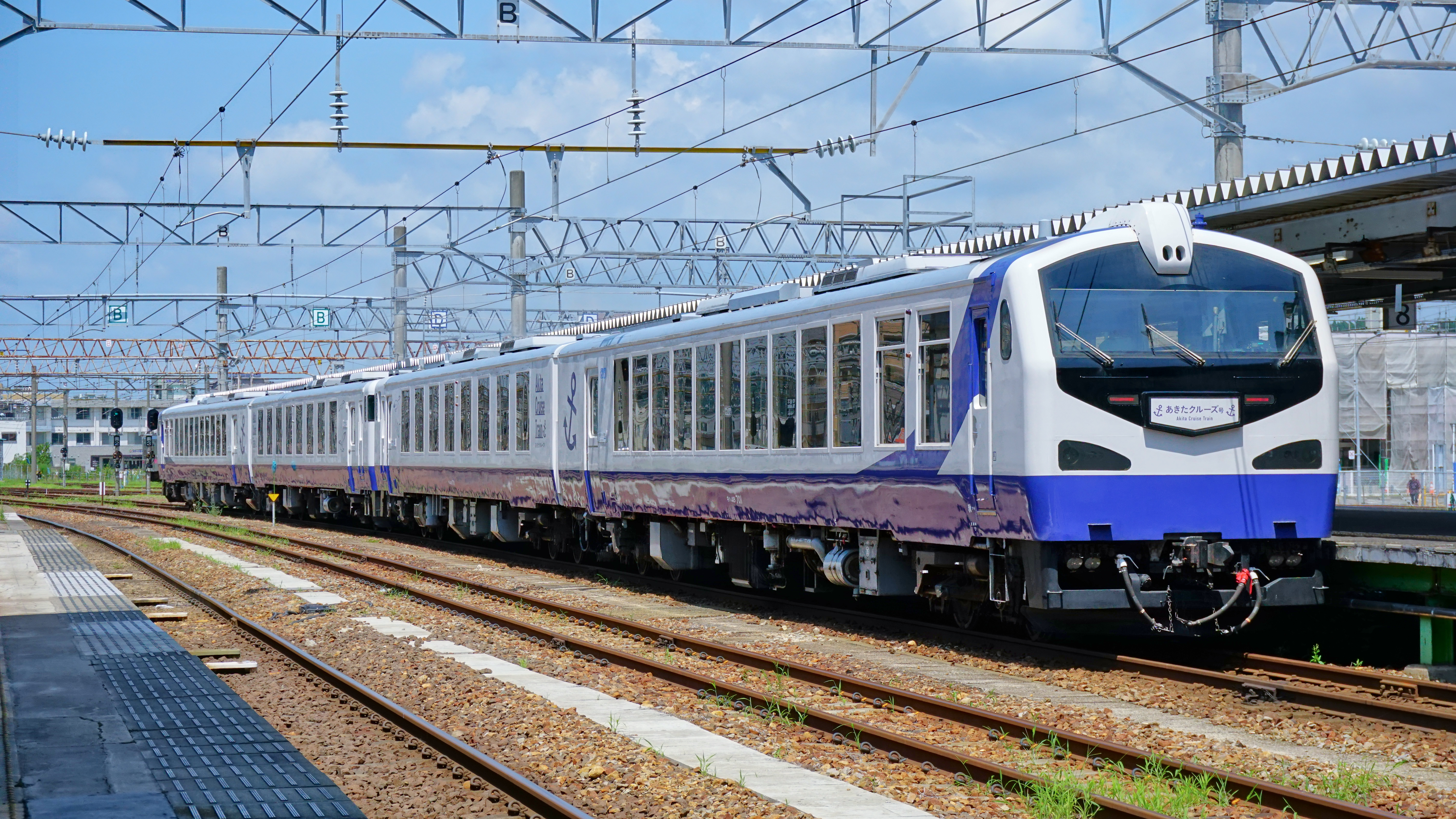
Akita Cruise Train, 2019

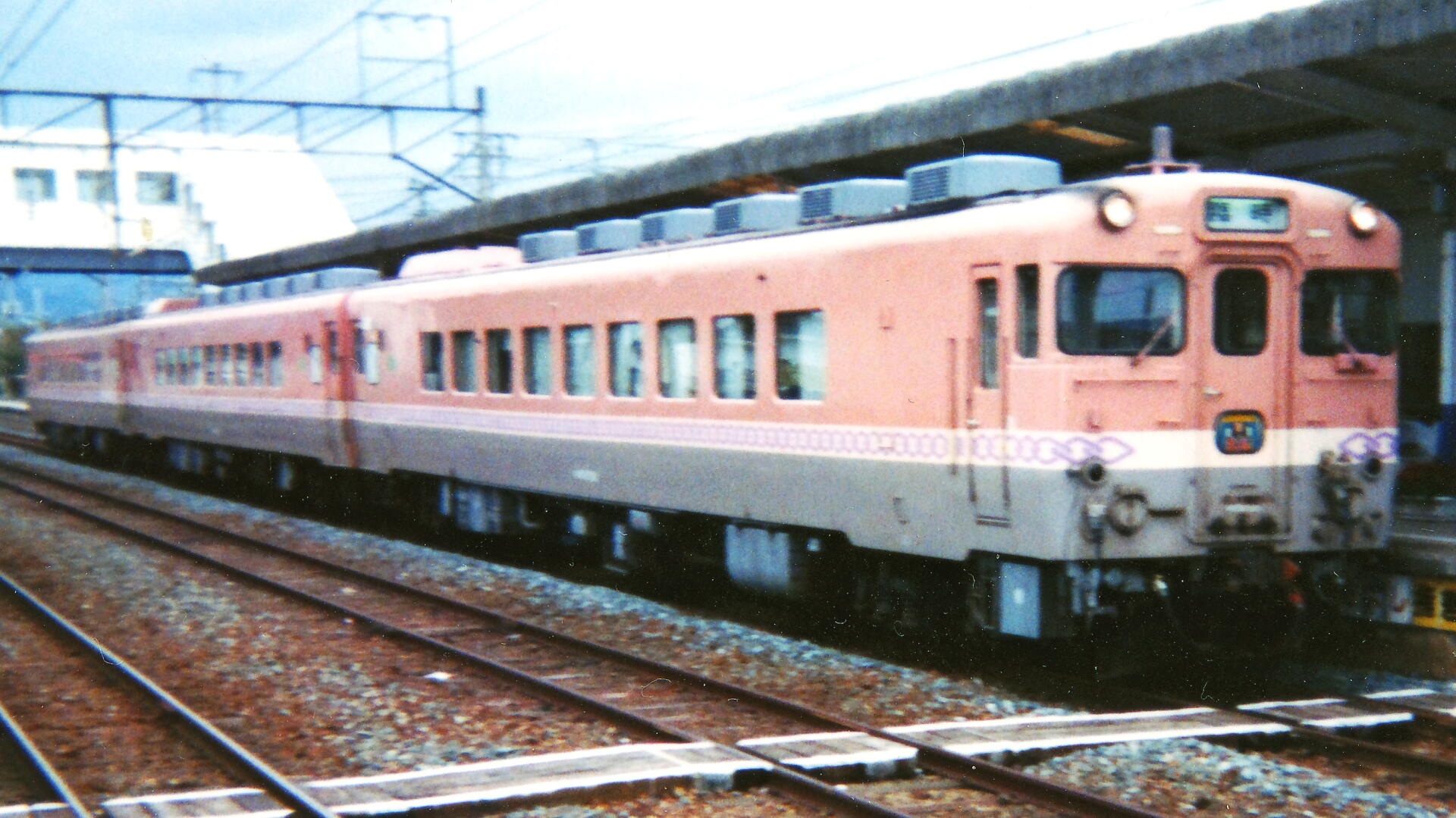
Obako while in service as Komachi

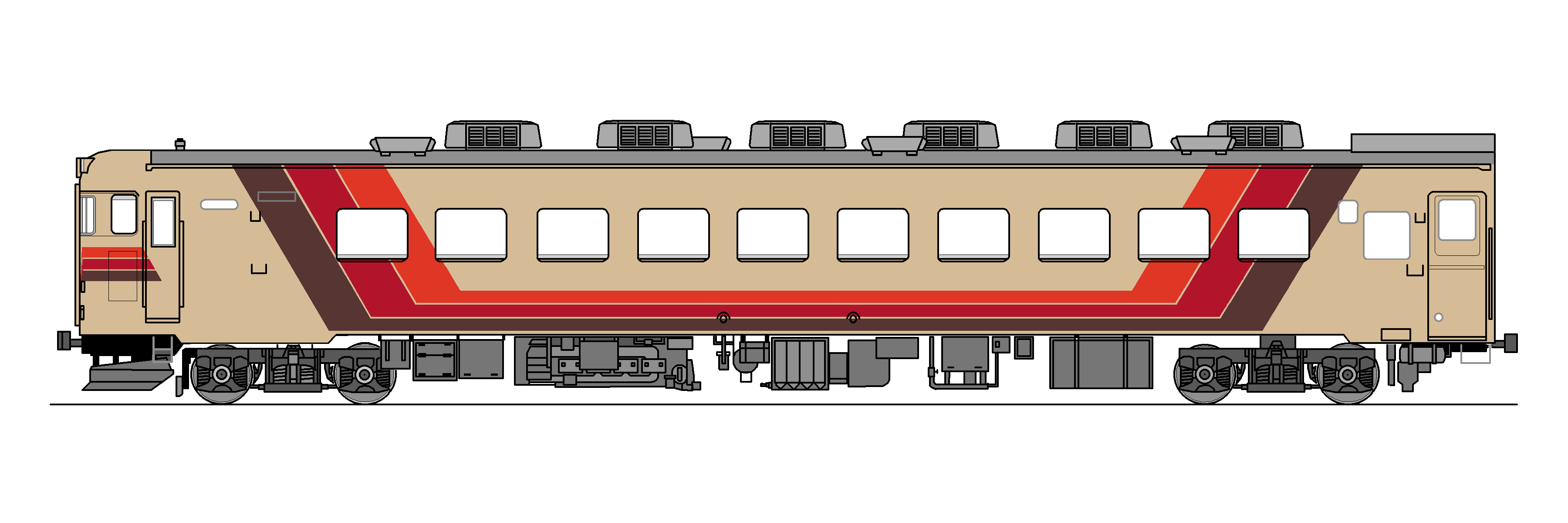
Paintscheme of the Elegance Acky

==== Loco hauled ====
Name	Japanese	Classification	No. of cars	Accommodation	Introduced	Withdrawn	Converted from	Depot/region	Remarks
Edo	江戸	12 series	6	Tatami	February 1986	March 2003	12 series	Shinagawa	
Fureai	ふれあい	SuRo 81 series	6	Tatami	March 1980	July 1990	SuRo 62 series	Shinagawa -> Mito	Replaced by Edo. Handed down to JR East by JNR, which operated the train as Ozashiki Shinagawa due to its location in Shinagawa. It was often nicknamed Shinaza by travellers. After its transfer to Mito due to Edo taking its spot in Shinagawa, it was often nicknamed as Mitoza following the example of Shinaza.
Fureai Ai	ふれあい愛	12 series	6	Tatami	1980	1990	12 series	Nagano	
Fureai Michinoku	ふれあいみちのく	12 series	6	Tatami	July 1986	May 2002	12 series	Morioka	
Kutsurogi (JR East)	くつろぎ	12 series	6	Tatami	June 1983	September 1999	12 series	Takasaki	
Nagoyaka	なごやか	12 series	6	Tatami	March 1981	July 1997	12 series	Oku, Tokyo	Was the Japanese-style trainset of the North Tokyo Bureau of the JNR. Renamed to Nagoyaka after JNR's privatisation.
Nostalgic View Train	ノスタルジックビュートレイン	JNR 50 series	2 x 3-car sets	Seating	1990	1997	50 series	Akita	Hauled by dedicated Class DE10 diesel locomotives. The first "Tourist Train" labeled as such. Replaced by Resort Shirakami DMU
Orient Saloon	オリエントサルーン	12 series	6	Tatami	January 1987	November 2000	12 series	Fukushima	
Ozashiki Train (Niigata Bureau)	お座敷列車 ("カヌ座")	12 series	6 -> 7 -> 8 -> 7	Tatami -> Mixed	July 1981	February 2002	12 series	Niigata	Was the Japanese-style trainset of the Niigata Bureau of the JNR. The Salon Sado, a European style car, was added to it in 1985. In 1999, Oro14-782, another European styled car, was added from the former Salon Express Tokyo. Oro12-704 was scrapped in 2001 when the train were relabeled as Ordinary Cars, and the train itself was withdrawn and scrapped in 2002.
Roman	浪漫	14 series	6	Tatami	November 1995	March 2007	14 series	Nagano	Repainted to gold and wine red in 2000. Replaced Shirakaba and replaced by Irodori.
Salon Express Tokyo	サロンエクスプレス東京	14 series	7	Seating	August 1983	January 1997	14 series	Shinagawa	Converted to become Yutori trainset. Oro14-702 was removed from the trainset during conversion and incorporated into the Ozashiki train of the Niigata bureau.
Shirakaba	白樺	12 series	6	Tatami	July 1983	November 1995	12 series	Nagano	Withdrawn and replaced by Roman.
Super Express Rainbow	スーパーエクスプレスレインボー	12/14 series	7	Seating	March 1987	March 2000	12/14 series	Oku	
American Train	アメリカントレイン	50 series	12	-	July 4, 1988	July 4, 1989	50 series	-	Traveled around Japan in an attempt to foster American-Japan friendship. It stopped at stations around Japan and did not take passengers, as its main intention was to be a mobile exhibition centre for American culture. Was also sent to Okinawa.
Yasuragi	やすらぎ	12 series	6	Tatami	April 1986	March 2001	12 series	Takasaki	Sold to Watarase Railway, becoming "Salon de Watarase". Watarase Railway used the train as a 3 car set (the other 3 cars were used as parts cars), taking both end cars and Oro12-853 and ran it as their own Joyful Train before scrapping it in 2009.
Yutori	ゆとり	14 series	6	Tatami	May 1997	March 2008	14 series	Oku, Tokyo	Converted from former Salon Express Tokyo trainset.
SL Ginga	SL銀河	KiHa 141 series	4	Seating	12 April 2014	11 June 2023	KiHa 141 series	Iwate	
Cassiopeia Travologue	カシオペア紀行	E26 Series	12	Sleeping Compartment	June 2016	June 2025	Purpose-Built	Ueno	Formerly a Limited Express Service and a tourist train, the Cassiopeia trainset has been running as a group charter train since 2016. Its role as a Limited Express service was replaced by the Hokkaido Shinkansen, and its role as a cruise train was replaced by the Train Suite Shikishima.

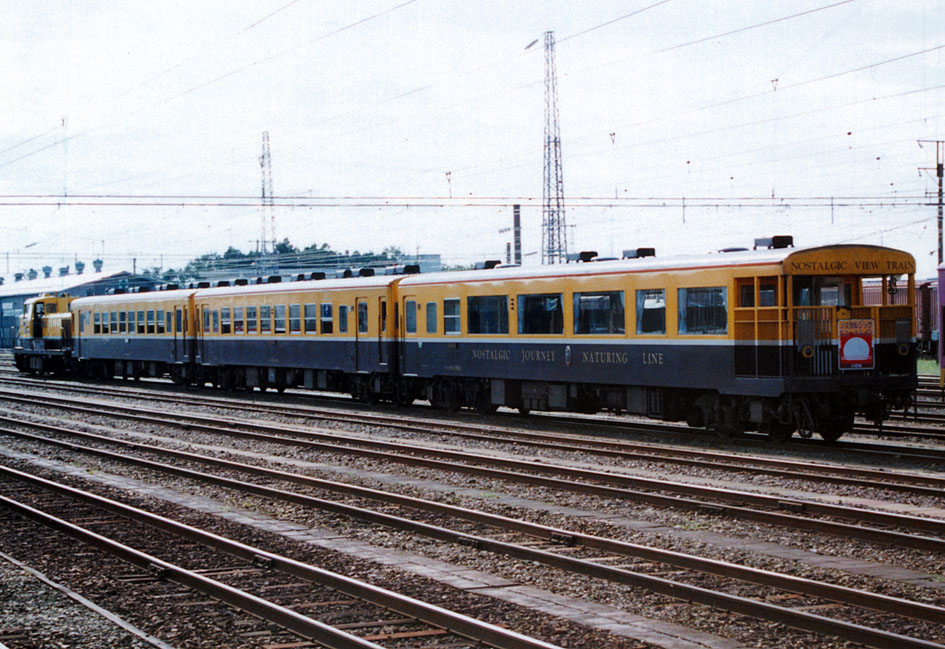
The Nostalgic View Train circa 1992

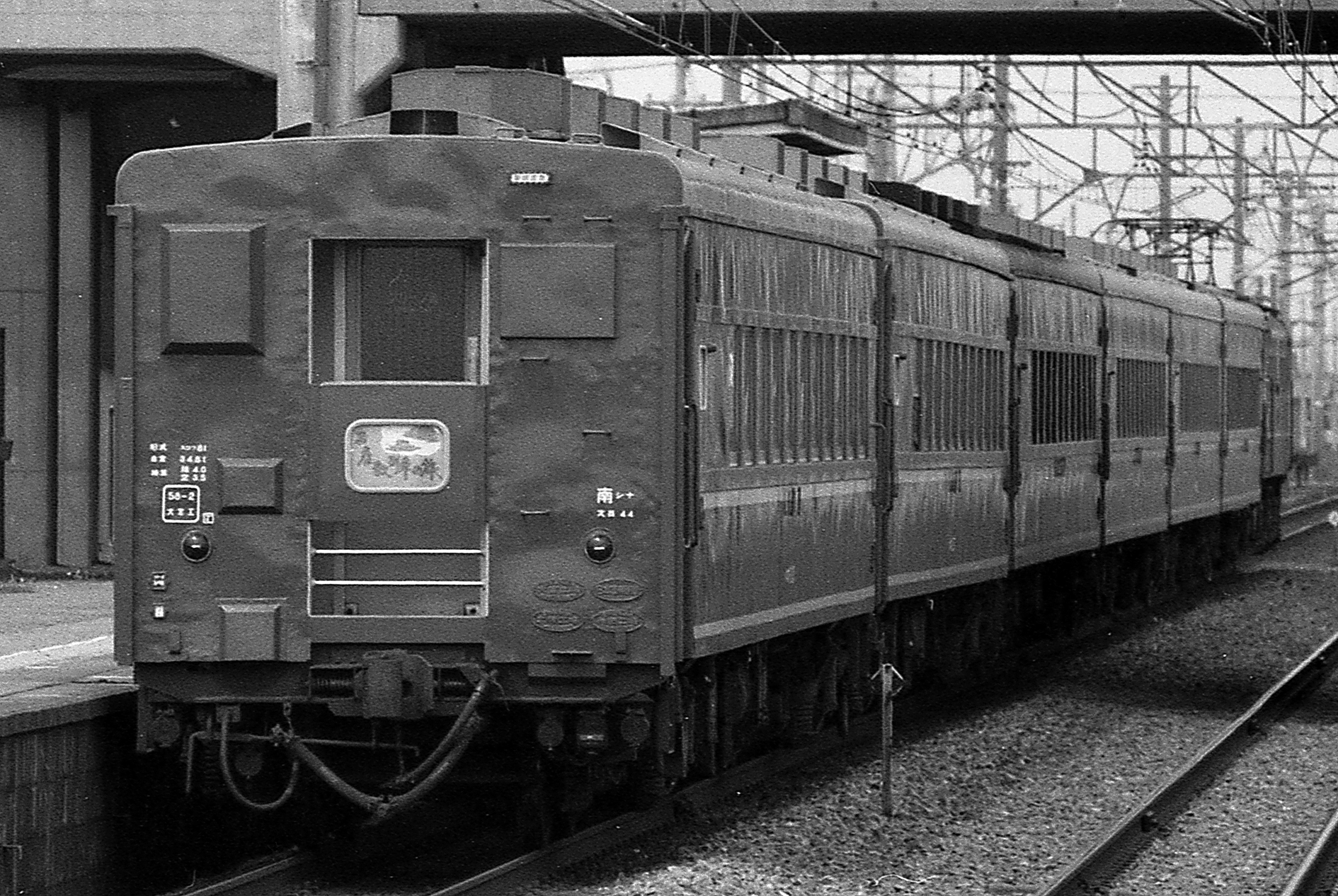
Fureai in JNR service as Ozashiki Shinagawa

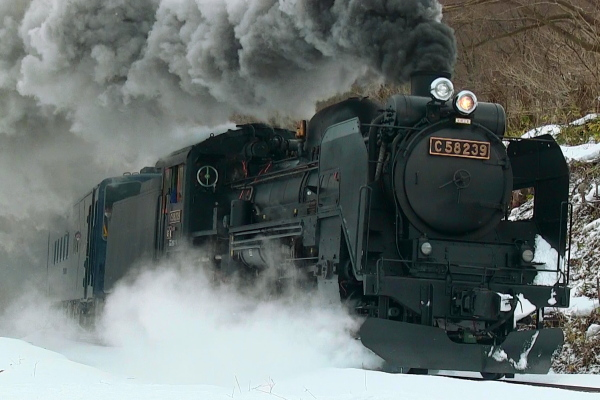
C58 239 hauling the SL Ginga

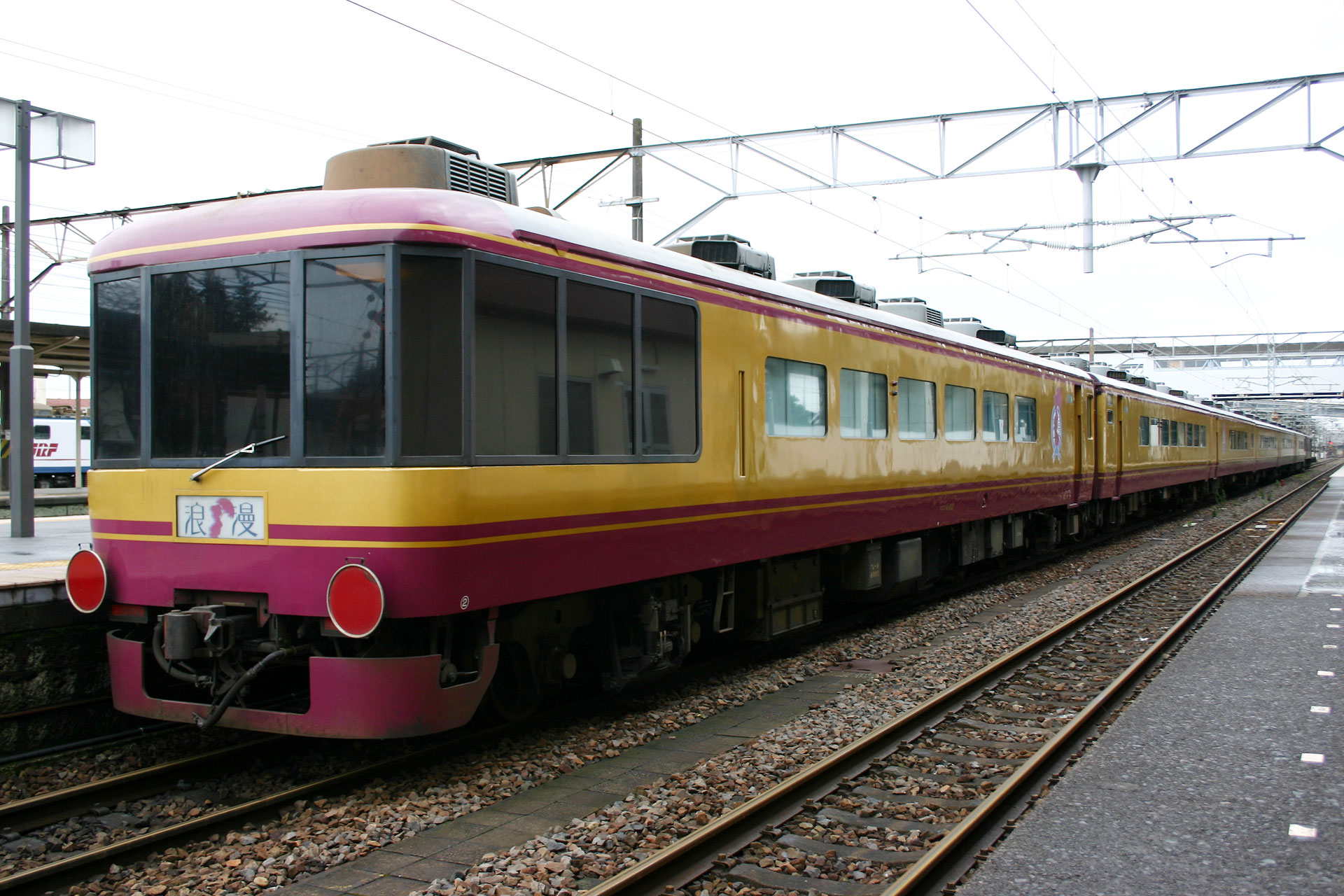
Roman

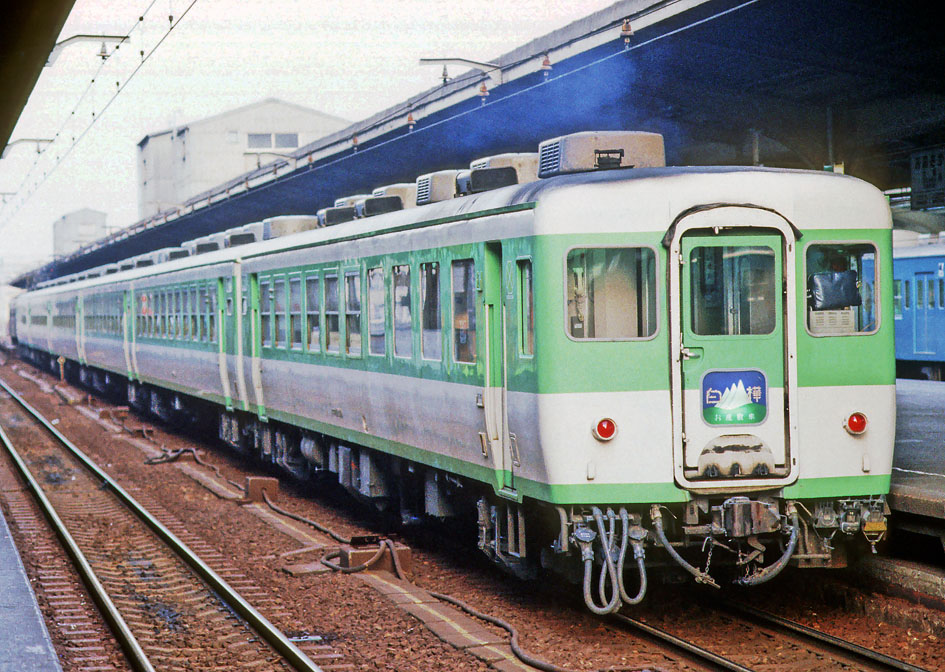
Shirakaba

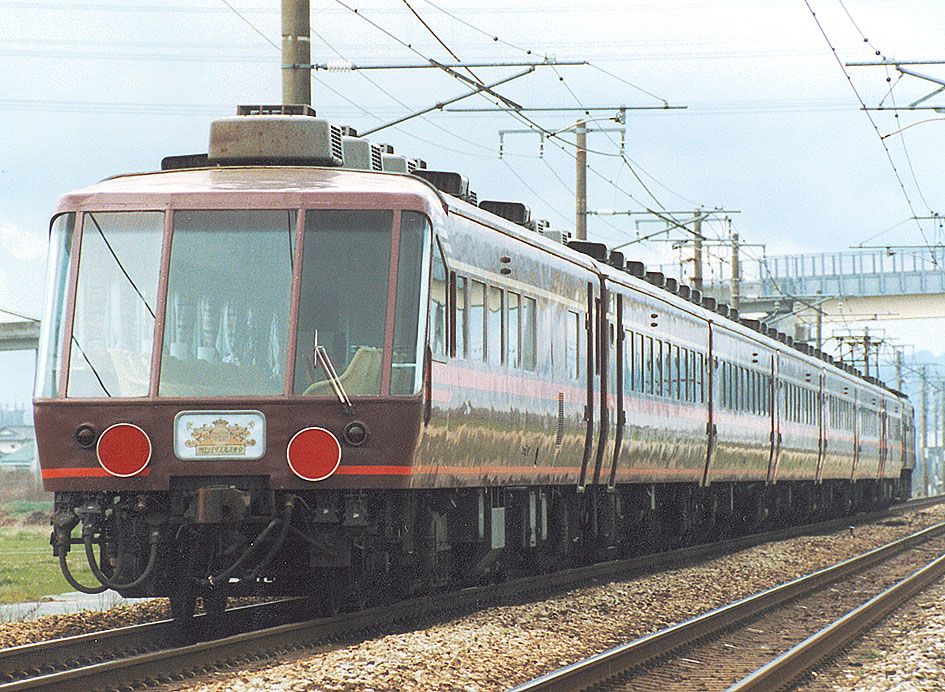
Salon Express Tokyo

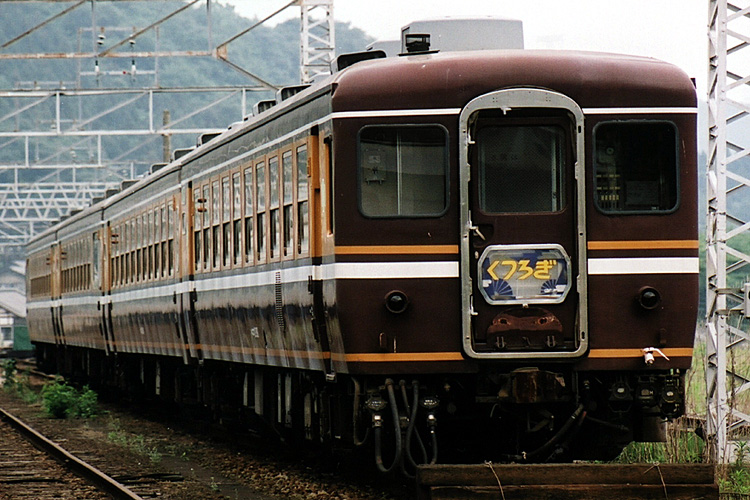
JR East's Kutsurogi

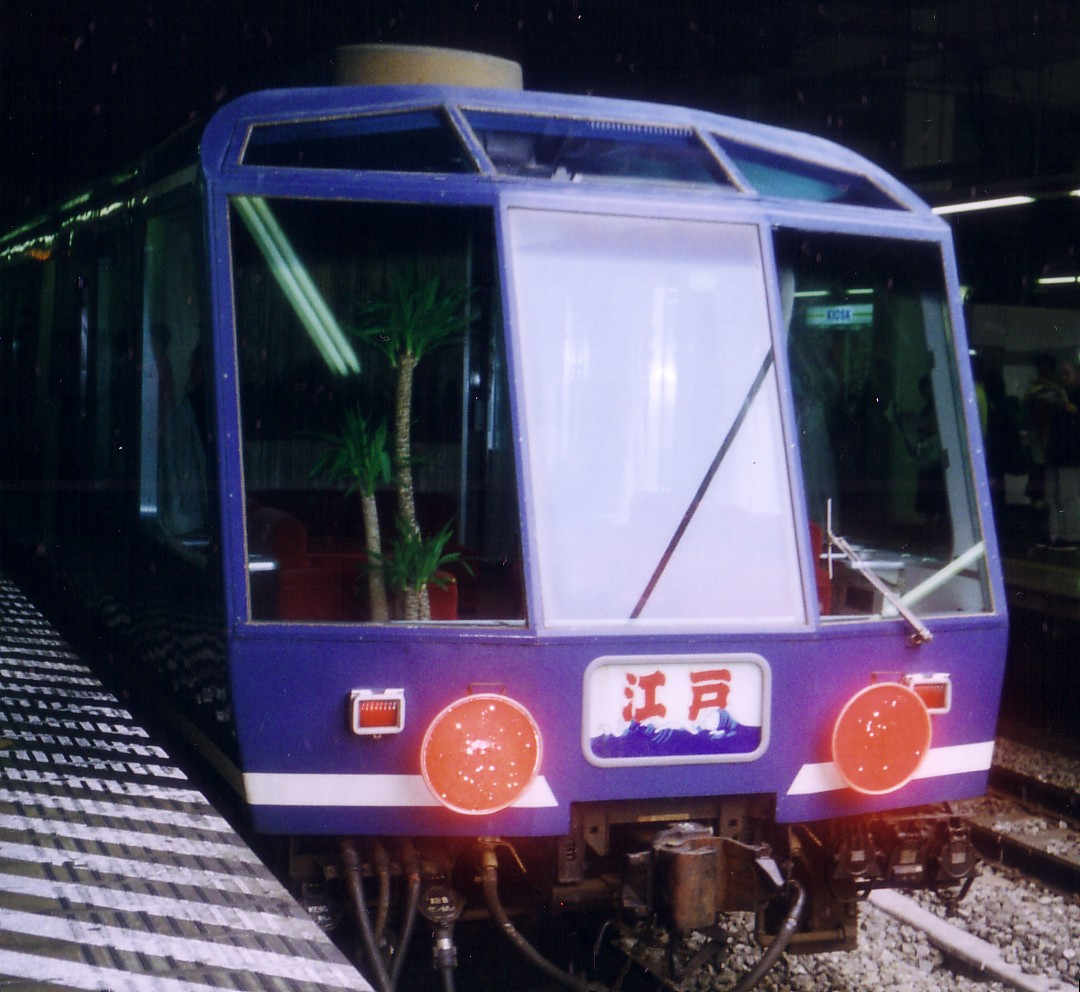
Edo

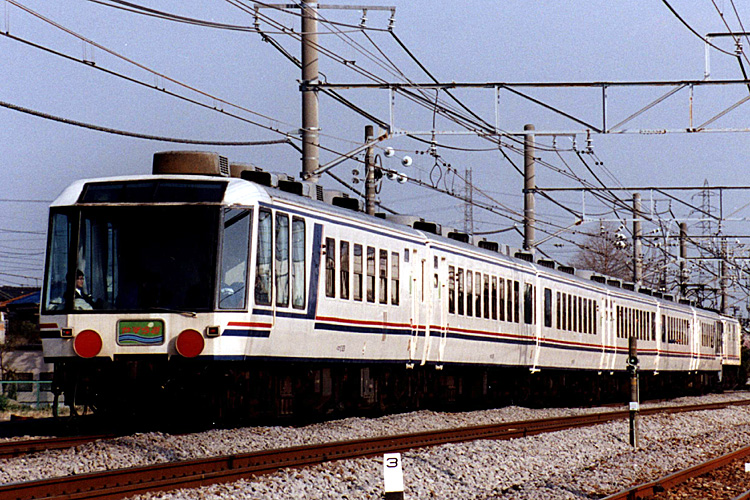
Yasuragi

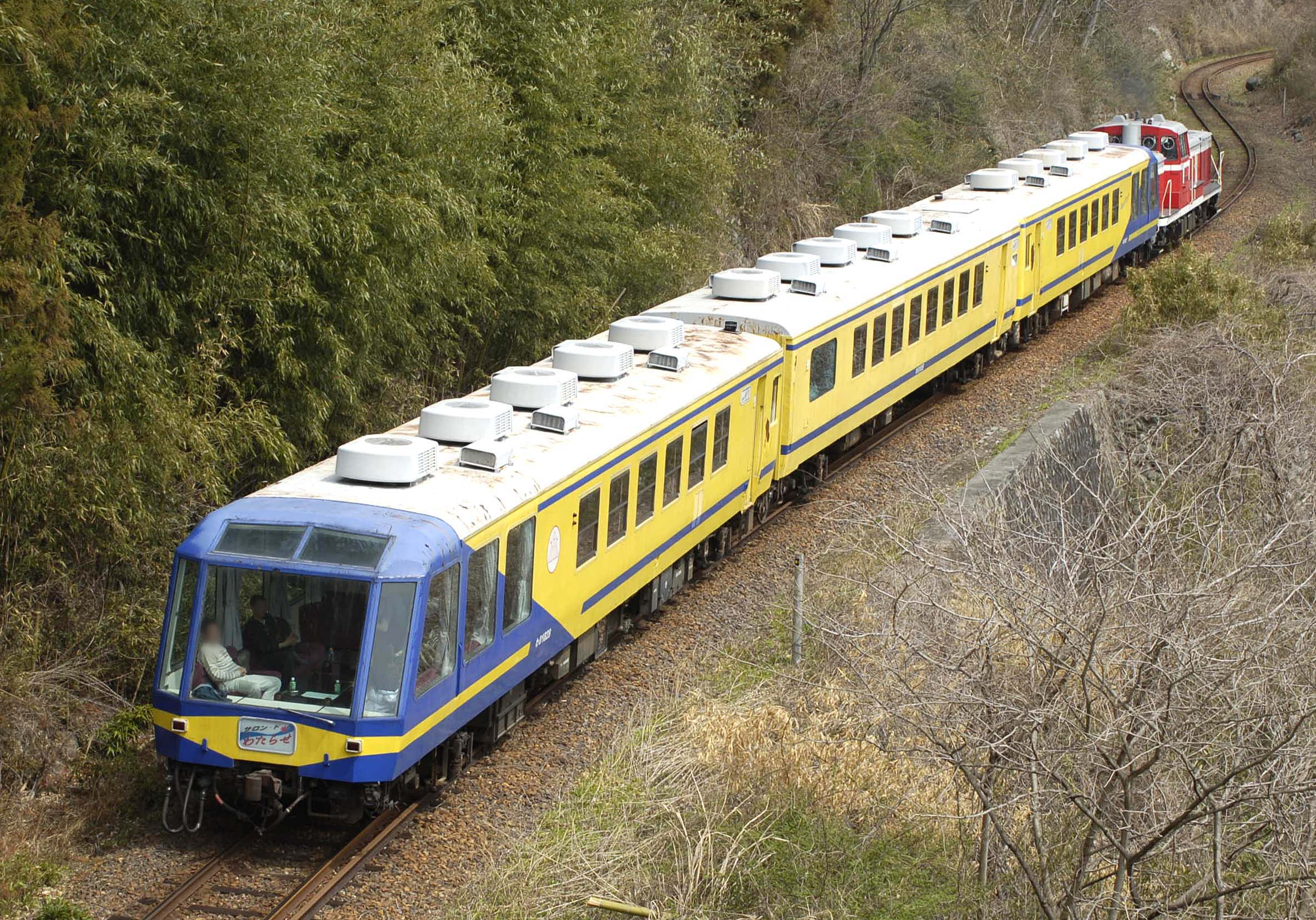
Yasuragi as Salon de Watarase

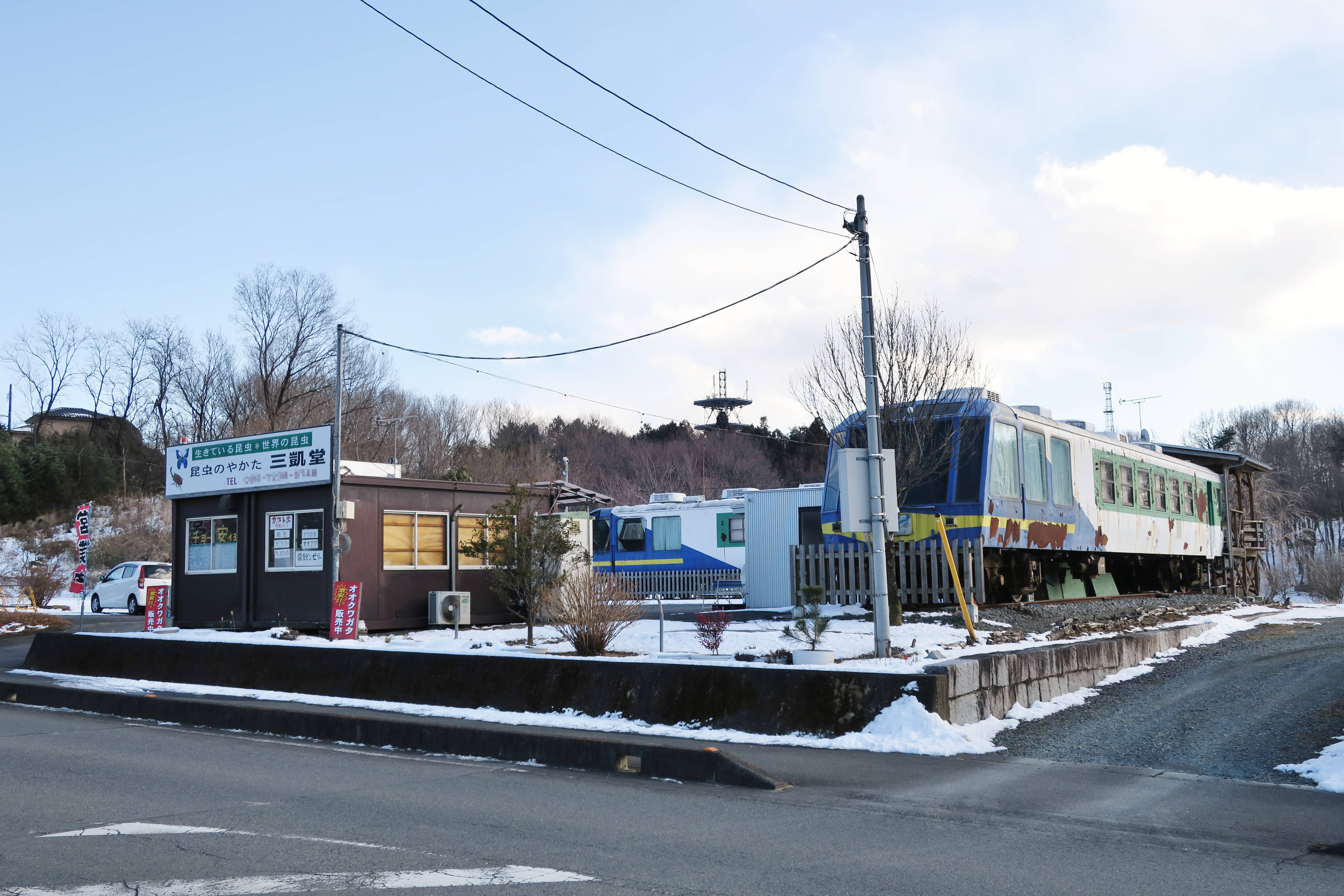
The remains of Salon de Watarase in an insect shop in Kiryu, Gunma

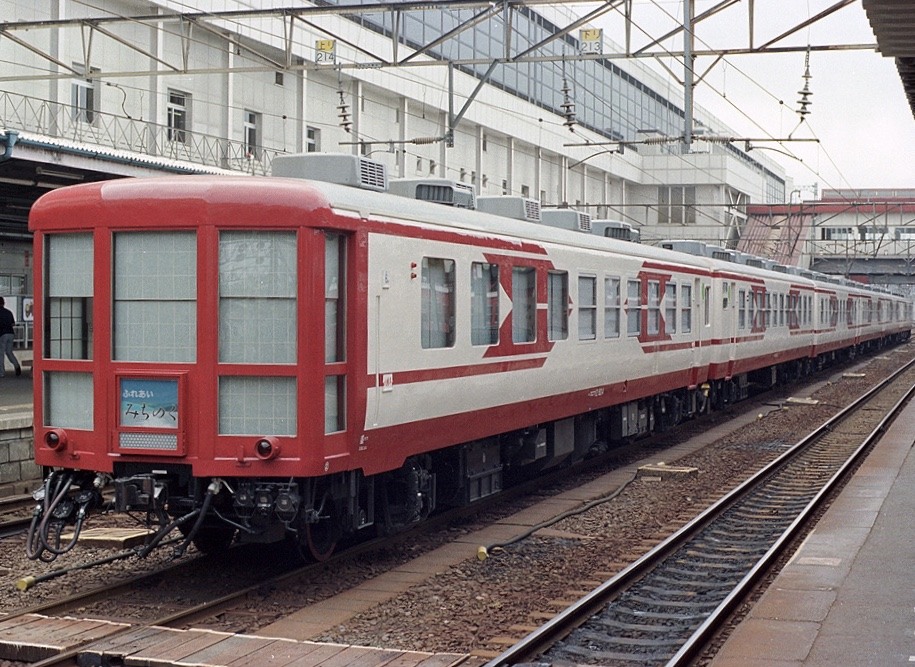
Fureai Michinoku

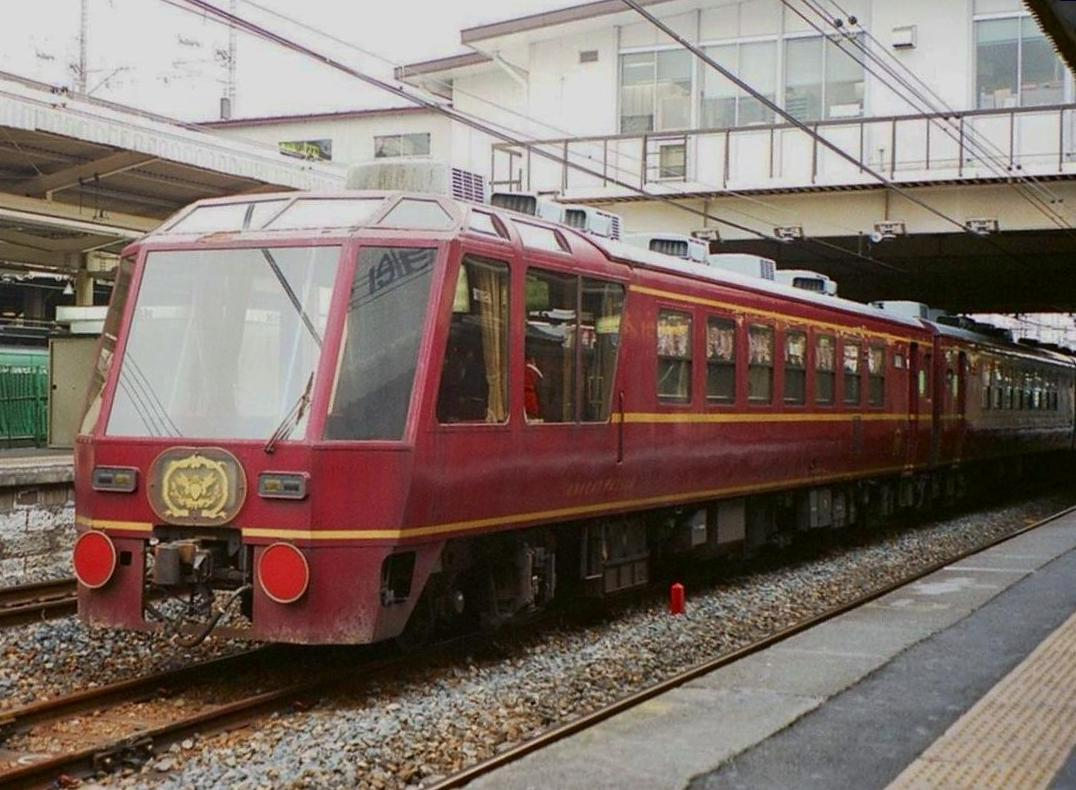
Orient Saloon

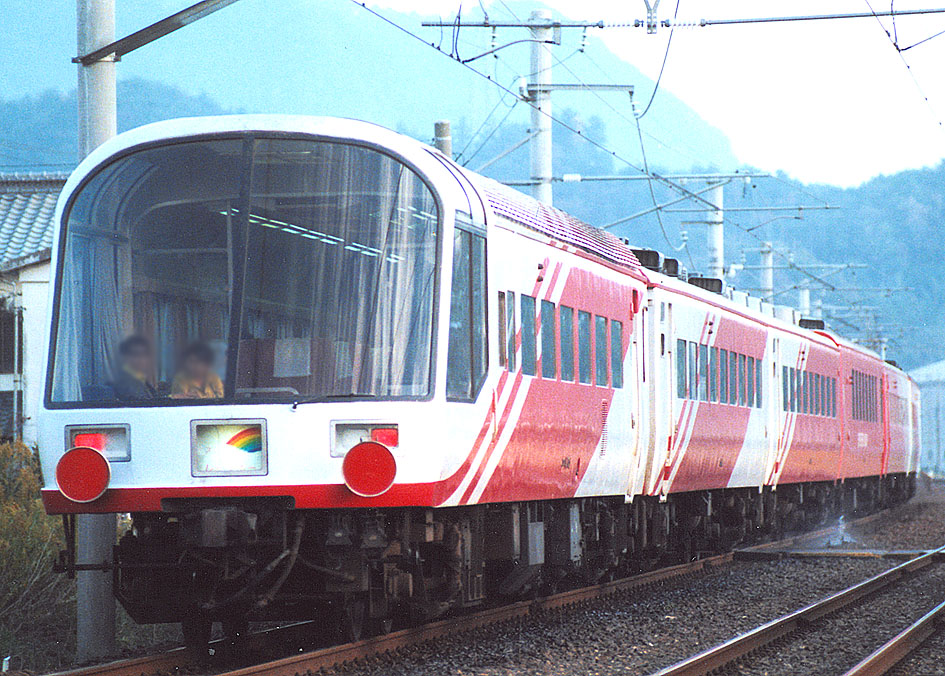
Super Express Rainbow

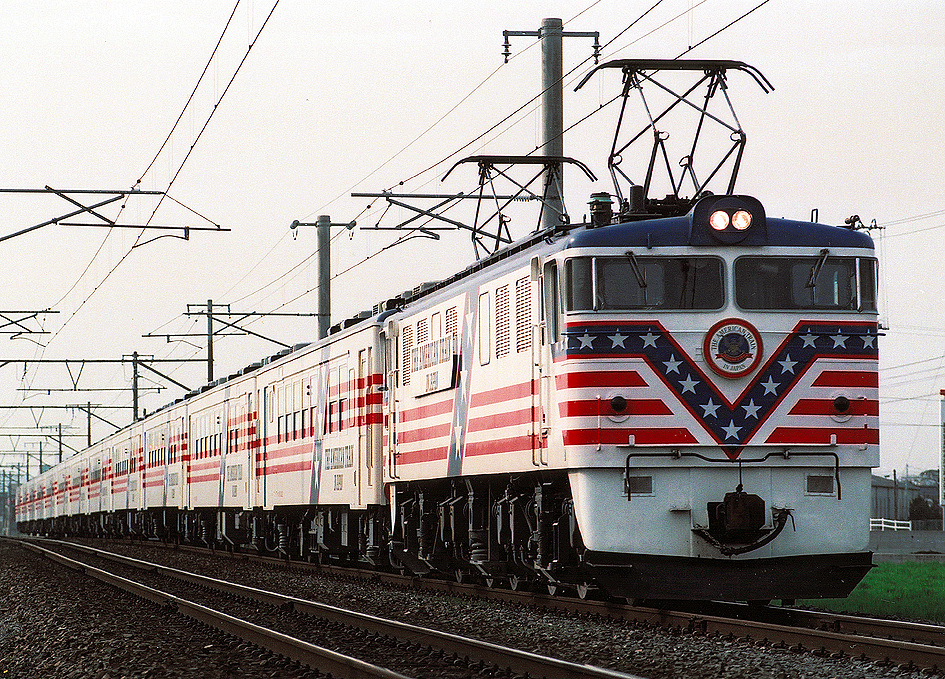
American Train

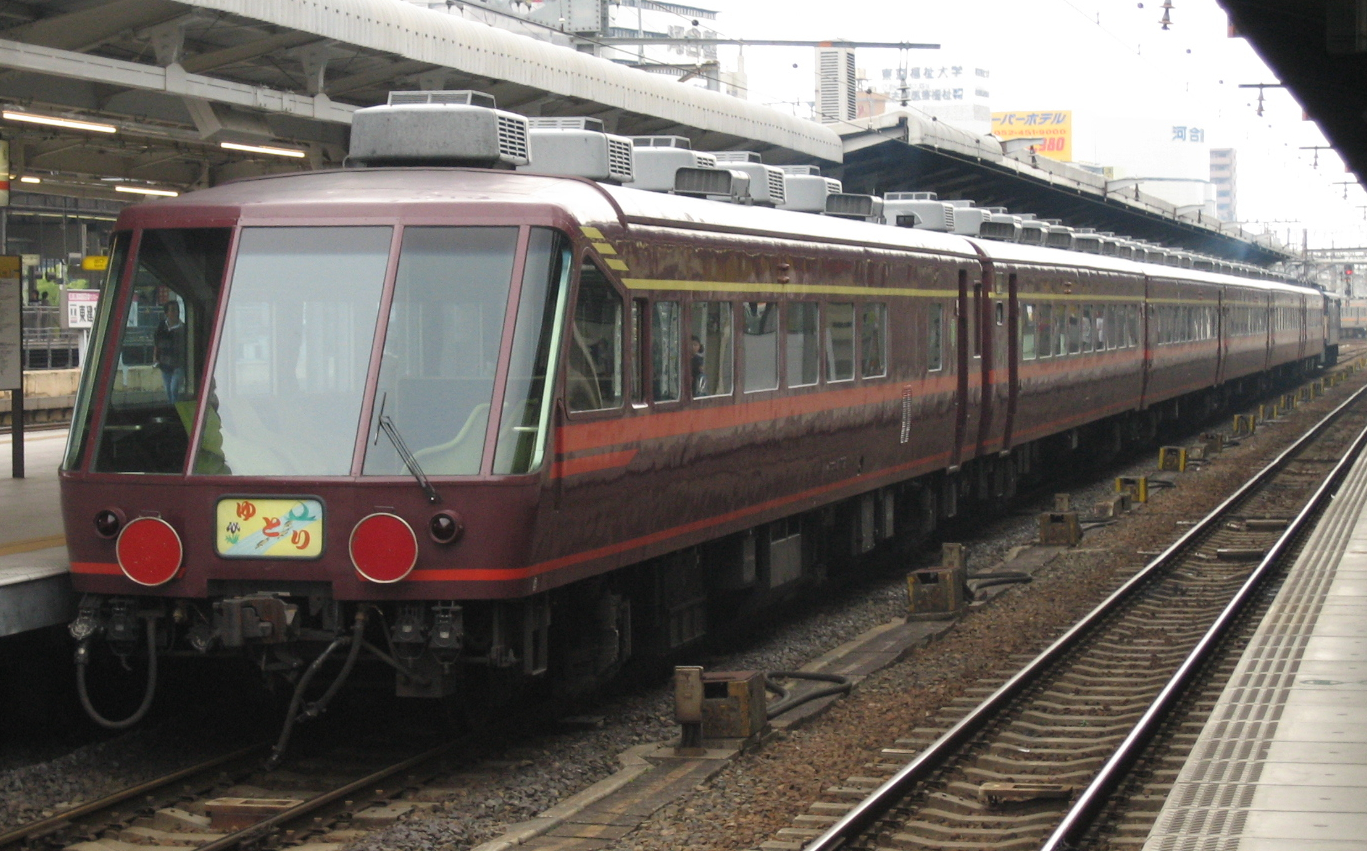
Yutori

=== JR Central ===
==== EMU ====
Name	Japanese	Classification	No. of cars	Accommodation	Introduced	Withdrawn	Converted from	Depot/region	Remarks
Train117	トレイン117	117 series	4	Seating	August 2010	21 July 2013 (final run)	117 series	Ōgaki	KuHa 116-206 + MoHa 116-45 + MoHa 117-45 + KuHa 117-23
Yū Yū Tōkai	ゆうゆう東海	165 series	3	Seating	July 1989	November 1999	165 series	Shizuoka	Kumoha 165-701 + MoHa 164-701 + KuHa 165-701

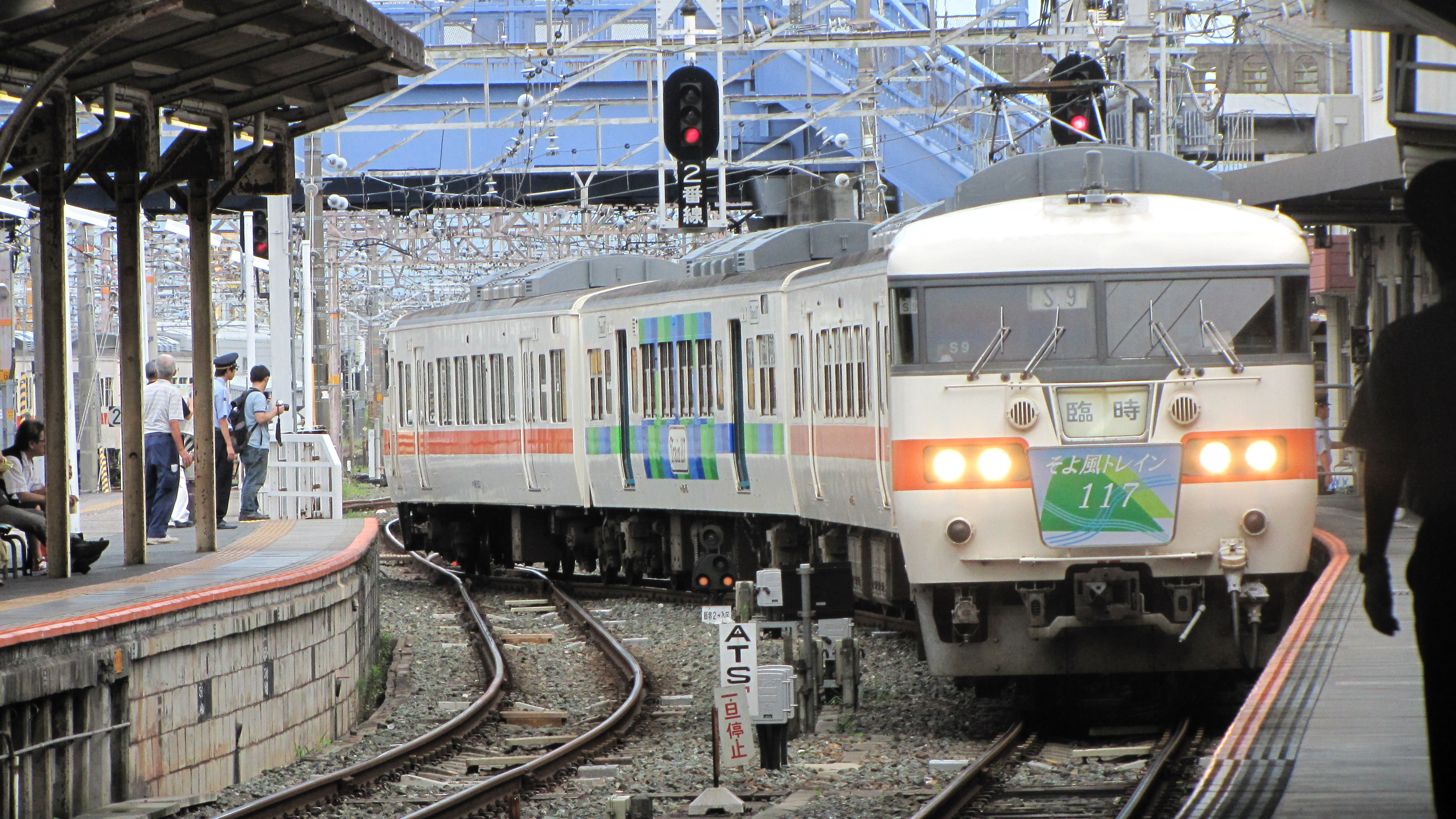
The Train117 in August 2010

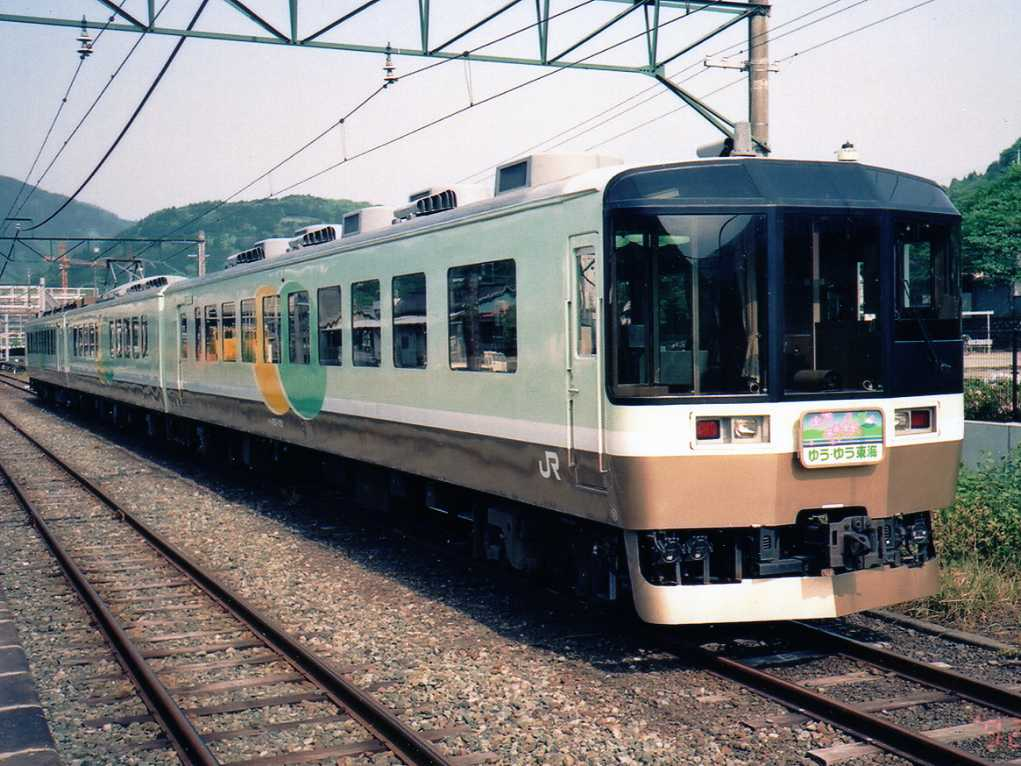
The Yū Yū Tōkai joyful train on Yamakita station in 1992

==== DMU ====
Name	Japanese	Classification	No. of cars	Accommodation	Introduced	Withdrawn	Converted from	Depot/region	Remarks
Resort Liner	リゾートライナー	KiHa 80 series	3	Seating	July 1988	March 1995	KiHa 80 series	Nagoya	KiRo 82-801 + KiRo 80-791 + KiRo 80-801

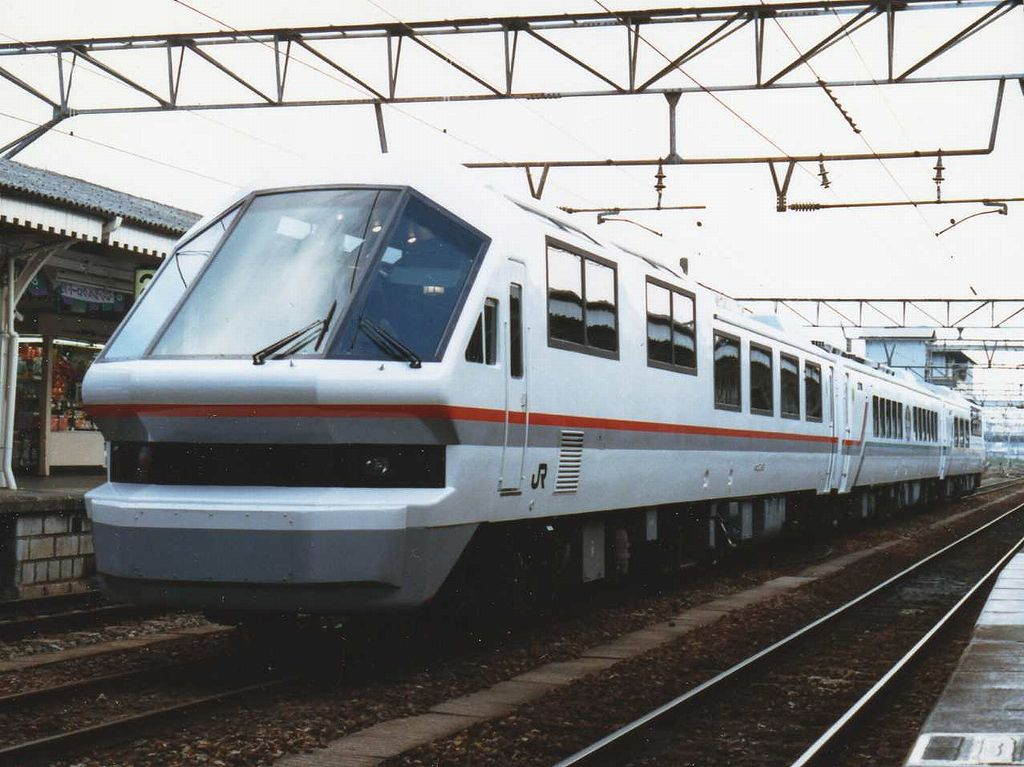
Resort Liner KiHa 80 series DMU in 1989

==== Loco hauled ====
Name	Japanese	Classification	No. of cars	Accommodation	Introduced	Withdrawn	Converted from	Depot/region	Remarks
Ikoi	いこい	12 series	6	Tatami	1982	February 1997	12 series	Numazu → Nagoya	The cars remained in regular 12 Series paint scheme, unlike other Joyful Train sets. It's the second time the name Ikoi has been used for a named train in Japan, as it was used before by JNR.
Euroliner	ユーロライナー	12-700 series	7	Seating	August 1985	April 2005	12 series	Nagoya	Euroliner liveried locos: EF64 35/66; EF65 105/106/112; DD51 592/791/1037
Ozashiki Ressha	お座敷列車 ("ナコ座")	12 series	6	Tatami	March 1983	October 1999	12 series	Nagoya	

=== JR West ===
==== EMU ====
Name	Japanese	Classification	No. of cars	Accommodation	Introduced	Withdrawn	Converted from	Depot/region	Remarks
Super Saloon Yumeji	スーパーサルーンゆめじ	211 series/213 series	3	Seating	1988	March 2010	Purpose-built	Okayama	KuMoRo 211-1 + MoRo 210-1 + KuRo 212-1001

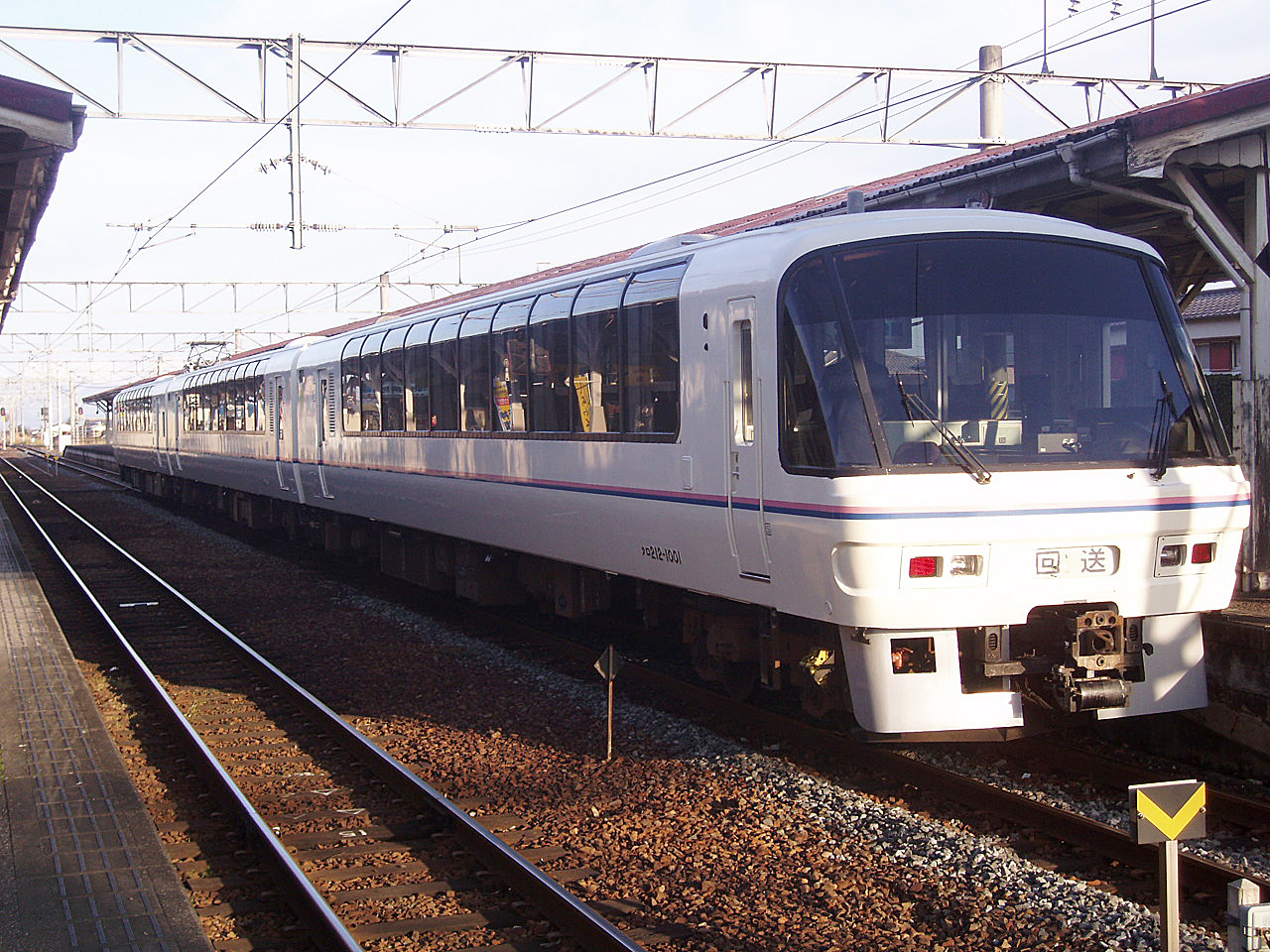
Super Saloon Yumeji 211/213 series, January 2007

==== DMU ====
Name	Japanese	Classification	No. of cars	Accommodation	Introduced	Withdrawn	Converted from	Depot/region	Remarks
Edel Tango	エーデル丹後	KiHa 65 series	2	Seating	July 1988	March 1996	KiHa 65 series	Kyoto	KiHa 65 601 + KiHa 65 1601; Operated in conjunction with 183-800 series Kitakinki EMU services between Osaka.
Edel Tottori	エーデル鳥取	KiHa 65 series	4	Seating	March 1989	October 1999	KiHa 65 series	Kyoto	
Edel	エーデル	KiHa 65 series	4	Seating	December 1989	October 2004	KiHa 65 series	Kyoto	
Yutopia (JR West)	ゆぅトピア	KiHa 65 series	2	Seating/Carpet	December 1986	March 1995	KiHa 65 series	Kanazawa	KiRo 65 1 + KiRo 65 1001; Operated in conjunction with 485 series Raichō EMU services between Kyoto and Osaka.
Resort Saloon Festa	リゾートサルーン・フェスタ	KiHa 58 series	3	Seating	July 1988	November 2001	KiHa 58 series	Hiroshima	KiRo 59 552 + KiRo 29 553 + KiRo 59 553. The "mouth" in the front of the train can open.
VIVA West	ビバ・ウエスト	KiHa 59 series	2	Seating	August 1989	March 1999	KiHa 58 series	Yamaguchi	KiHa 59 501 + KiHa 29 501
Seychelle	セイシェル	KiHa 58 series	3	Seating/Carpet	October 1989	January 2005	KiHa 58 series/12 series	Fukuchiyama	KiRo 59 554 + KiSaRo 59 501 + KiRo 59 555
Golden Express Astre	ゴールデンエクスプレスアストル	KiHa 65/KiHa 58 series	3	Seating	March 1988	December 2006	KiHa 65/KiHa 58 series	Kanazawa	KiRo 65 551 + KiRo 29 552 + KiRo 65 1551
Fureai Pal	ふれあいパル	KiHa 58 series	2	Carpet	April 1986	October 2007	KiHa 58 series	Hiroshima	KiRo 59 504 + KiRo 29 503
Fureai Sun-in	ふれあいSUN-IN	KiHa 58 series	3	Tatami	April 1986	July 2008	KiHa 58 series	Yonago	KiRo 59 506 + KiRo 59 505 + KiRo 29 507
Honobono Sun-in	ほのぼのSUN-IN	KiHa 58 series	2	Tatami	November 1987	November 2009	KiHa 58 series	Yonago	KiRo 59 551 + KiRo 29 551
Misuzu Shiosai	みすゞ潮彩	KiHa 47	2	Seating	July 2007	January 2017	KiHa 47	Yamaguchi	Converted to become Maru Maru No Hanashi
Tenkū no shiro Takedajōato	天空の城 竹田城跡号	KiHa 40	1	Seating	March 2015	May 2019	KiHa 40	Hyōgo	Converted to become Umiyamamusubi
Setouchi Marine View	瀬戸内マリンビュー	KiHa 47	2	Seating	October 2005	December 2019	KiHa 47	Hiroshima	Converted to become etSETOra

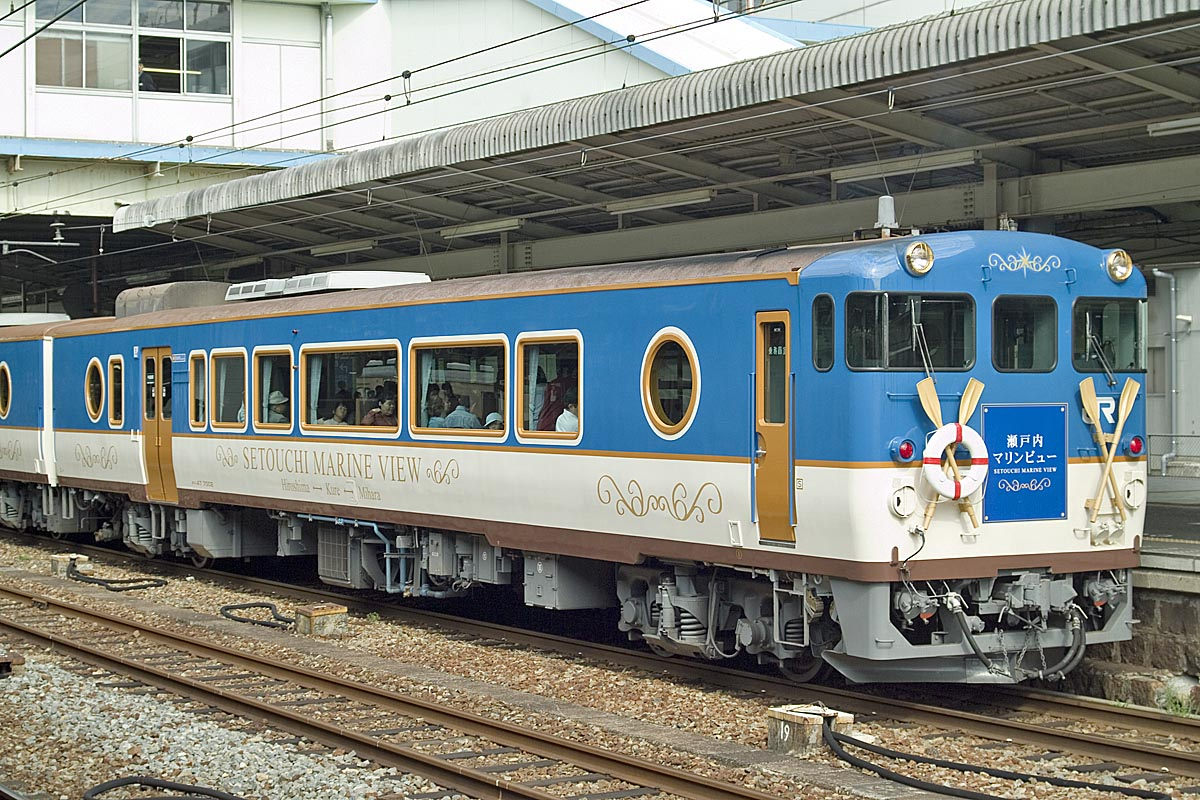
Setouchi Marine View, 2005

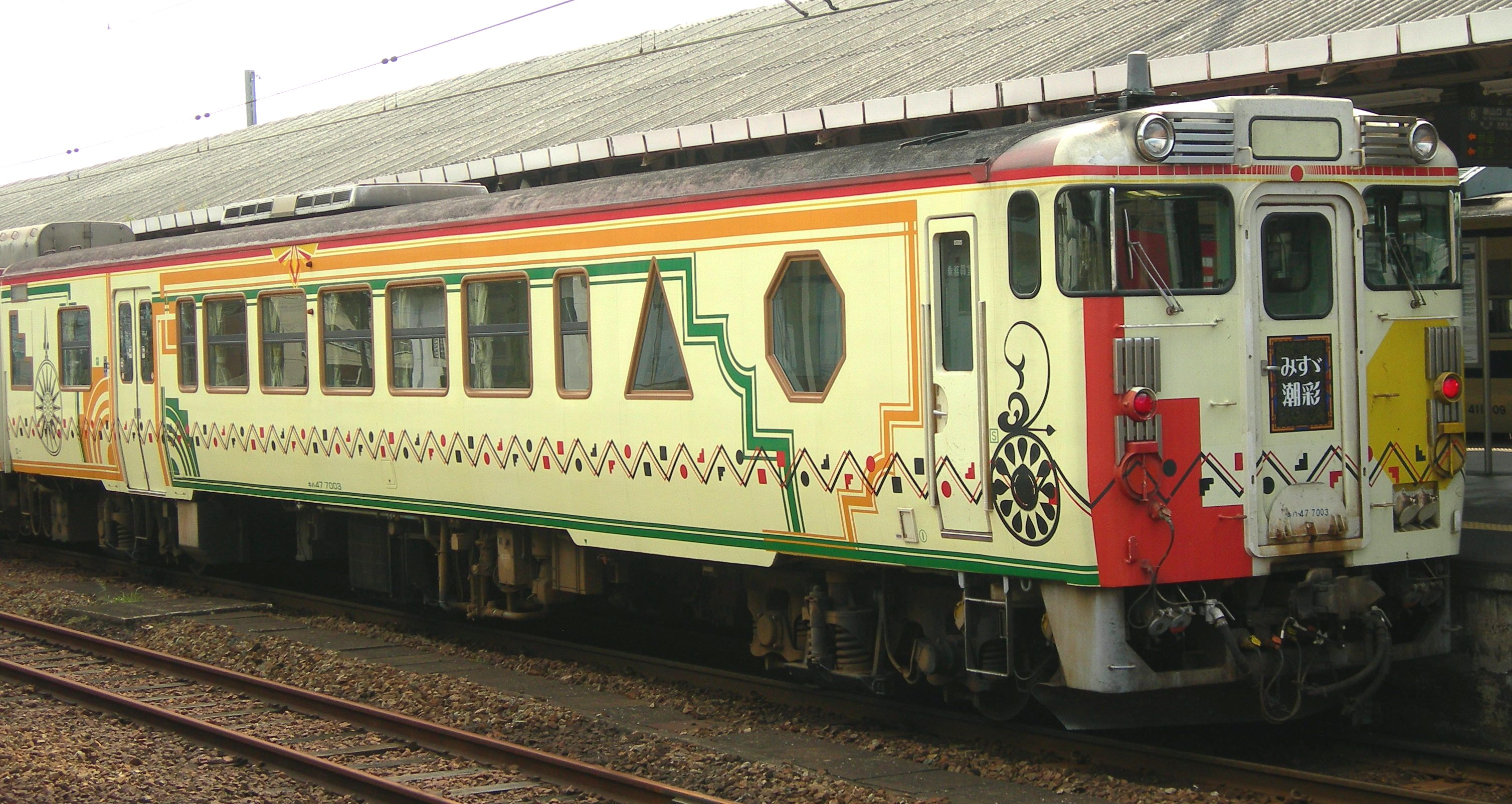
Misuzu Shiosai

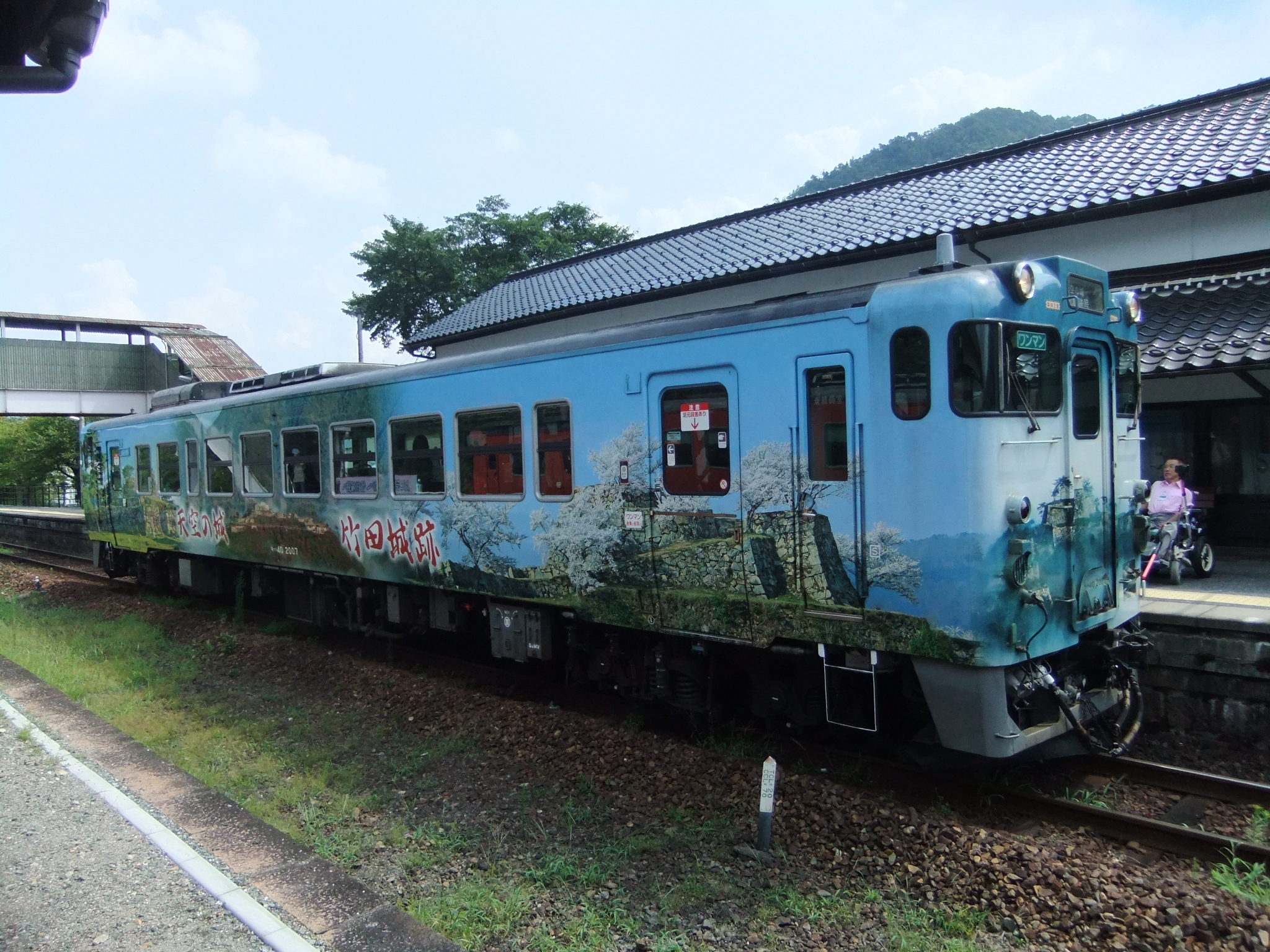
Tenku no Shiro Takedajoato, 2015

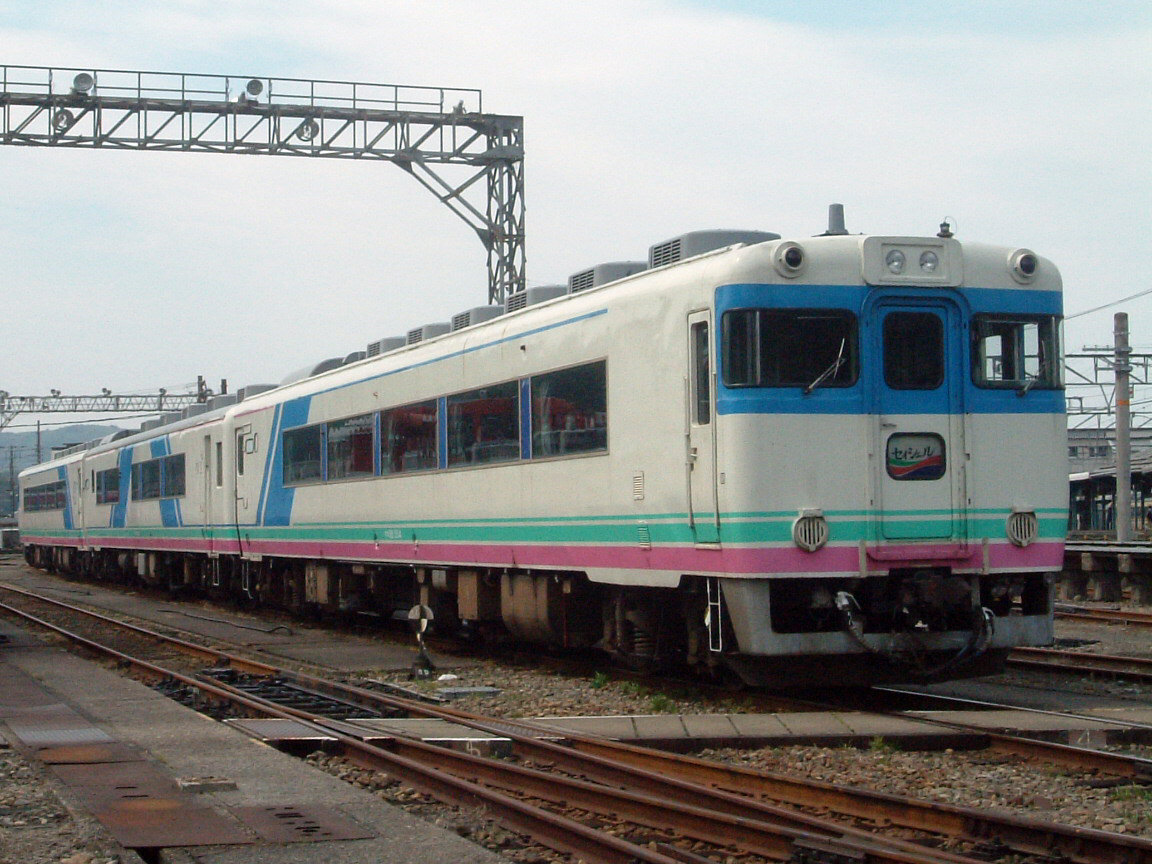
Seychelle

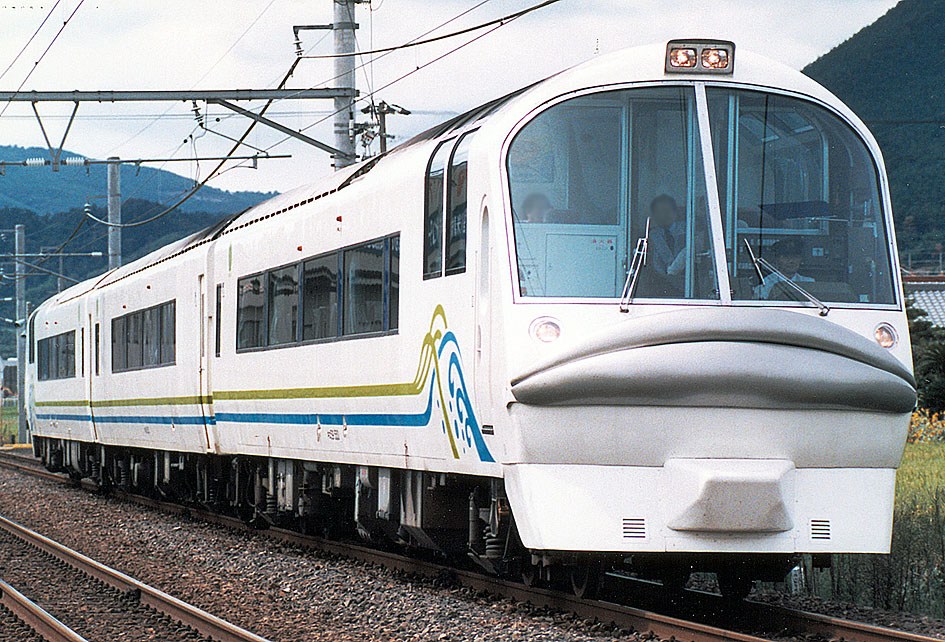
Resort Saloon Festa

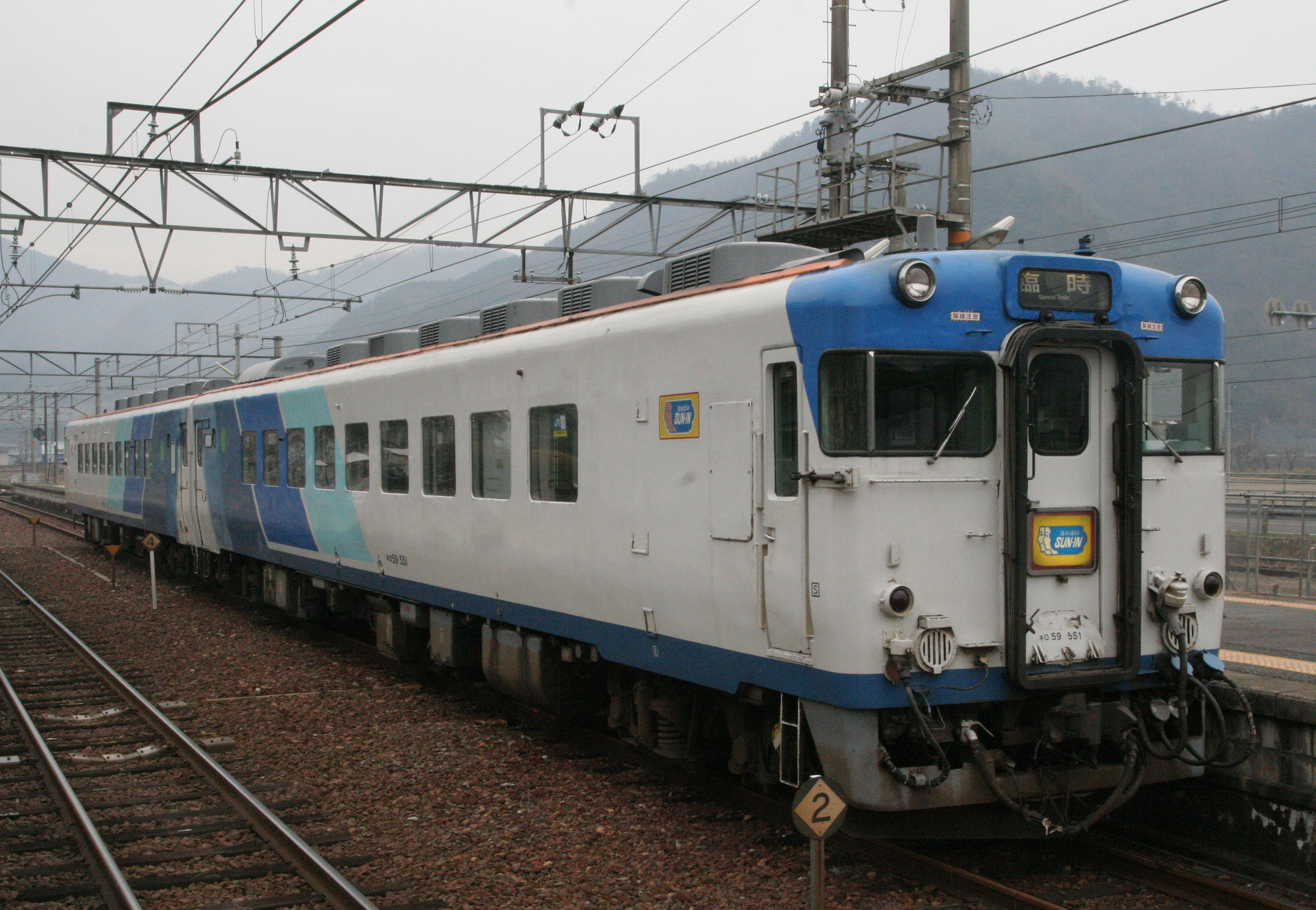
Honobono Sun-In

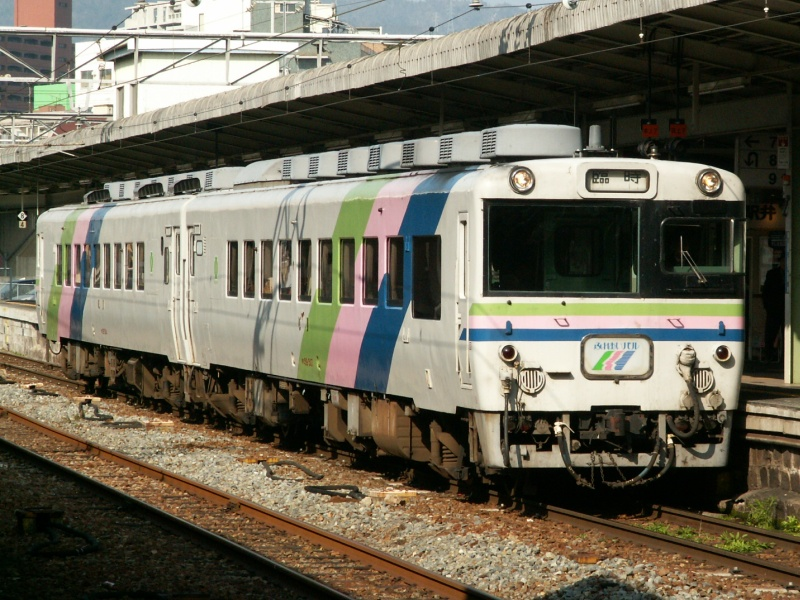
Fureai Pal

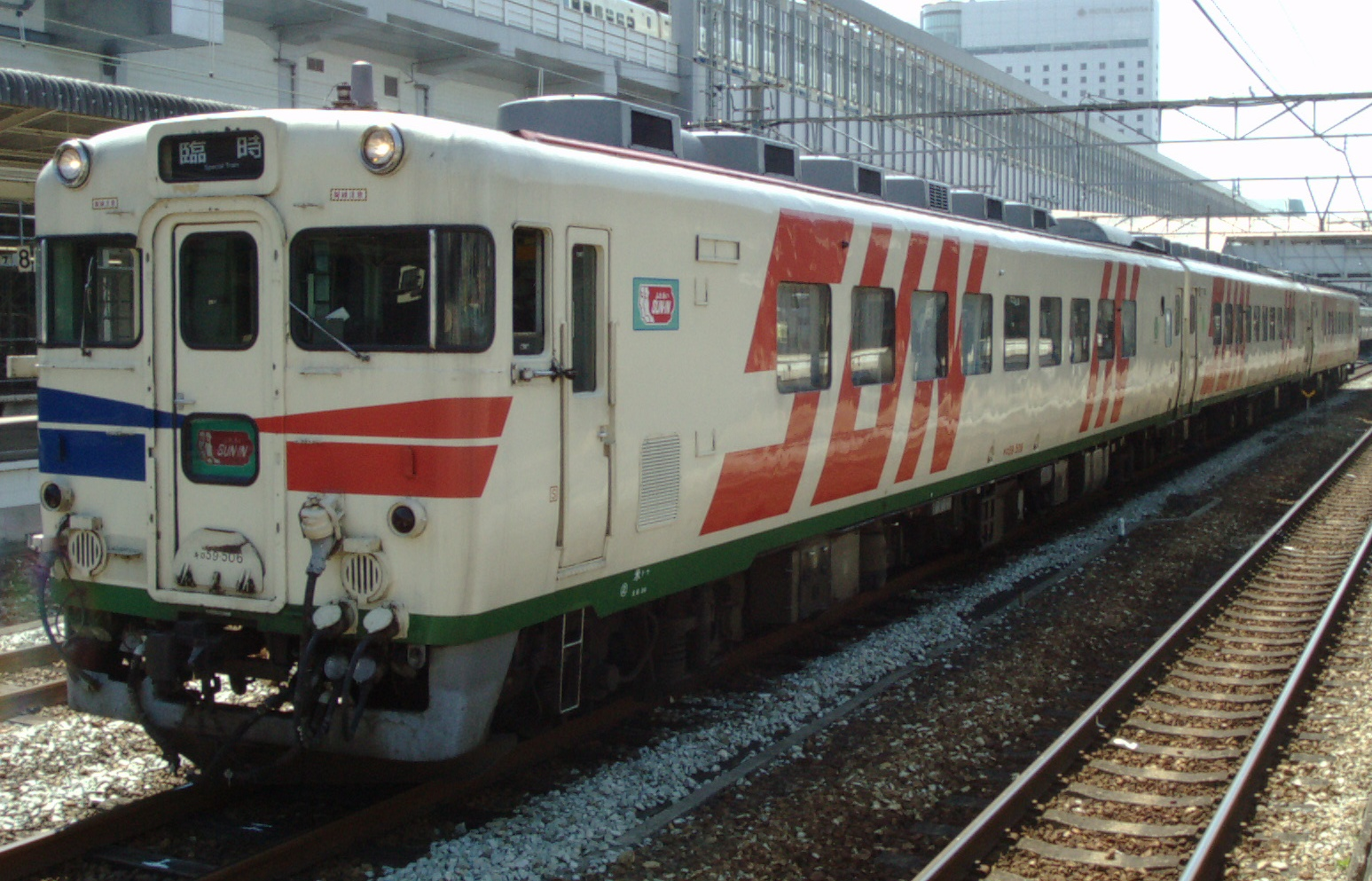
Fureai Sun-In

==== Loco hauled ====
Name	Japanese	Classification	No. of cars	Accommodation	Introduced	Withdrawn	Converted from	Depot/region	Remarks
Holiday Pal	ホリデーパル	JNR 20 series/14 series	8	Compartments	June 1984	September 1997	20/14 series	Hiroshima	Was in standard JNR 20 Series colours until 1990, when it was repainted to white and grey with a purple body stripe. Later used to run Asakaze and Genkai service before scrapping.
Ozashiki Train (Tennoji Bureau)	お座敷客車	12 series	6	Tatami	July 1981	1989	12 series	Tennoji	The Japanese styled car of the Tennoji Railway Bureau of the JNR. Withdrawn 1989 and converted to become Ikiiki Salon Kinokuni.
Ikiiki Salon Kinokuni	いきいきサロンきのくに	12 series	6	Tatami	September 1989	June 2007	12 series	Wakayama	Converted from Tennoji Bureau's Ozakishi train.
Ikoi (Fukuchiyama Bureau)	いこい	12 series	1	Mixed	April 1985	1989	12 series	Fukichiyama	Half in Japanese style, half in Western style. Ran passenger services sandwiched between two KiHa 58 series DMUs. Later incorporated into Seychelle.
Tabiji	旅路	12-800 series	6	Tatami	July 1981	30 September 2007	12 series	Hiroshima	Extensively refurbished in September 1994 for the Asian Games held that year in Hiroshima. Changes include new panorama end cars, repainting and reordering of the cars, and the removal of individually named carriages.
Wakuwaku Danran	わくわく団らん	12 series	6 -> 5	Tatami	July 1982	December 2006	12 series	Kanazawa	The Japanese styled train of the Kanazawa Bureau of the JNR. Overhauled in 1993 to become Wakuwaku Danran, and Oro12-826 was scrapped in 1995.
Yuu Yuu Salon Okayama	ユウユウサロン岡山	12 series	6	Seating	November 1985	March 2011	12 series	Okayama	Originally named "ゆうゆうサロン岡山". Refurbished and repainted in January 1994.
Asuka	あすか	12 series/14 series	7	Tatami/Seating	November 1987	31 March 2018	12/14 series	Miyahara, Osaka	
SL Yamaguchi (12 series)	SLやまぐち号（12系）	12 series	5	Seating	July 1988	September 2017	12 series	Yamaguchi	Sold to Ōigawa Railway in February 2018.
Okuizumo Orochi	奥出雲おろち号	12 series	2	Seating	April 1998	November 2023	12 series	Goto	Replaced by Ametuchi. Had a dedcicated locomotive.
SL Kita-Biwako	SL北びわこ号	12 series	5	Seating	August 1995	November 2019	12 series	Shiga	
Kinokuni Sea Side	きのくにシーサイド	12 series	2	Seating	1999	2007	12 series & 24 Series	Wakayama	
Resort Train	リゾートトレイン	14 series	4	Seating	1988	2009	14 Series	Wakayama	Originally made for skiing services and has a large luggage area. Later renamed to Moonlight Kyushu in the 2000s.
Salon Car Naniwa	サロンカーなにわ	14 series	7	Seating	September 1983	July 2025	14 series	Miyahara, Osaka	

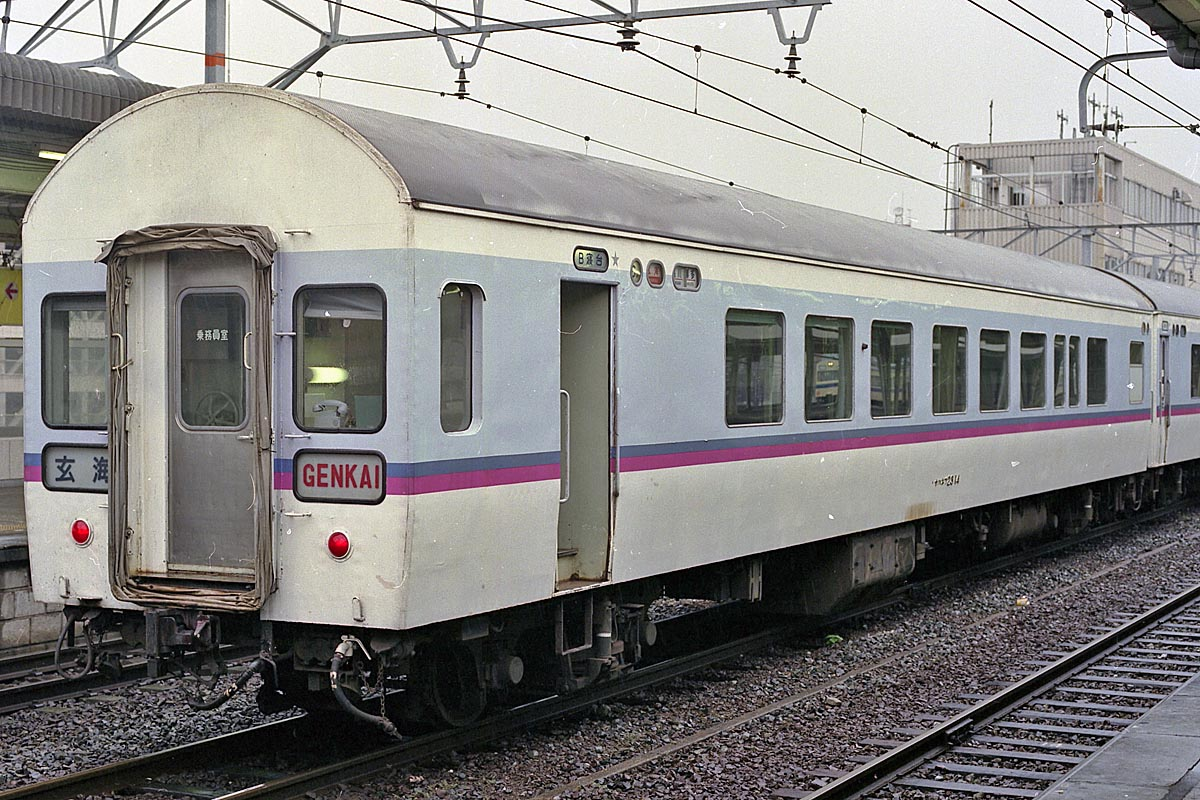
Holiday Pal

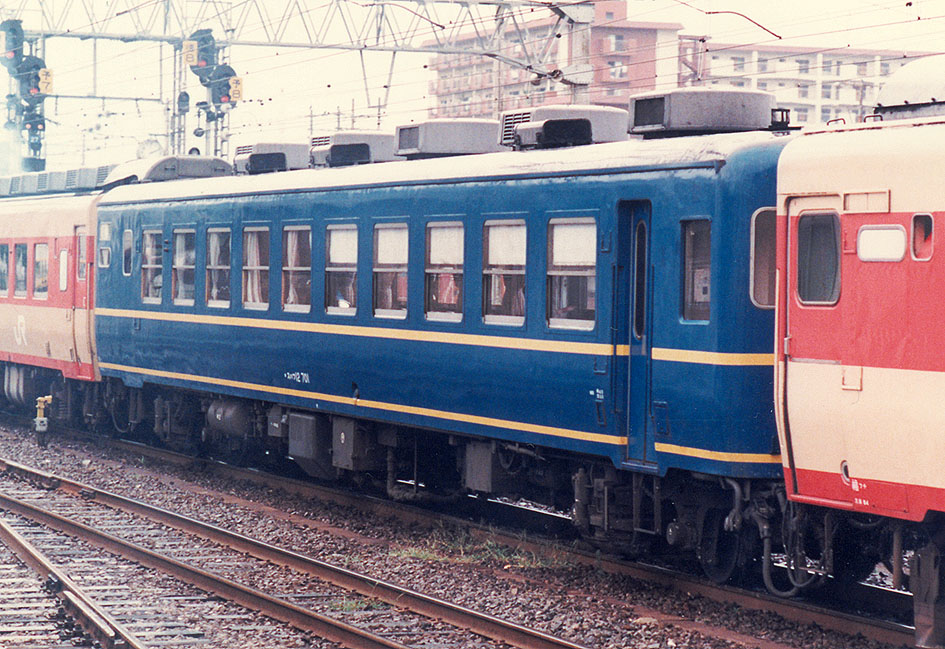
Fukuchiyama Ikoi

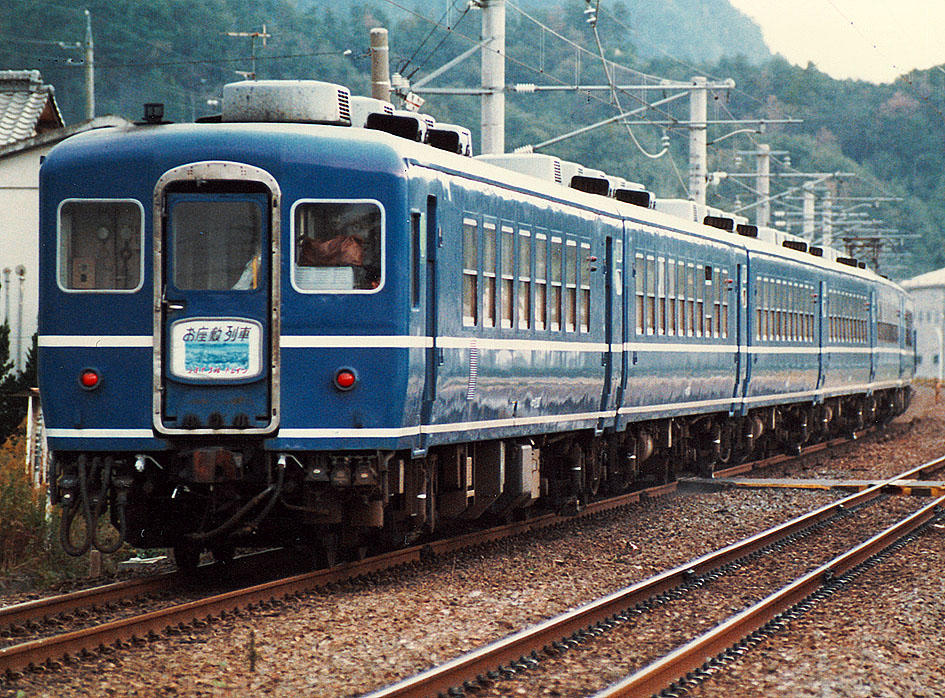
Ozasiki Kyakusha

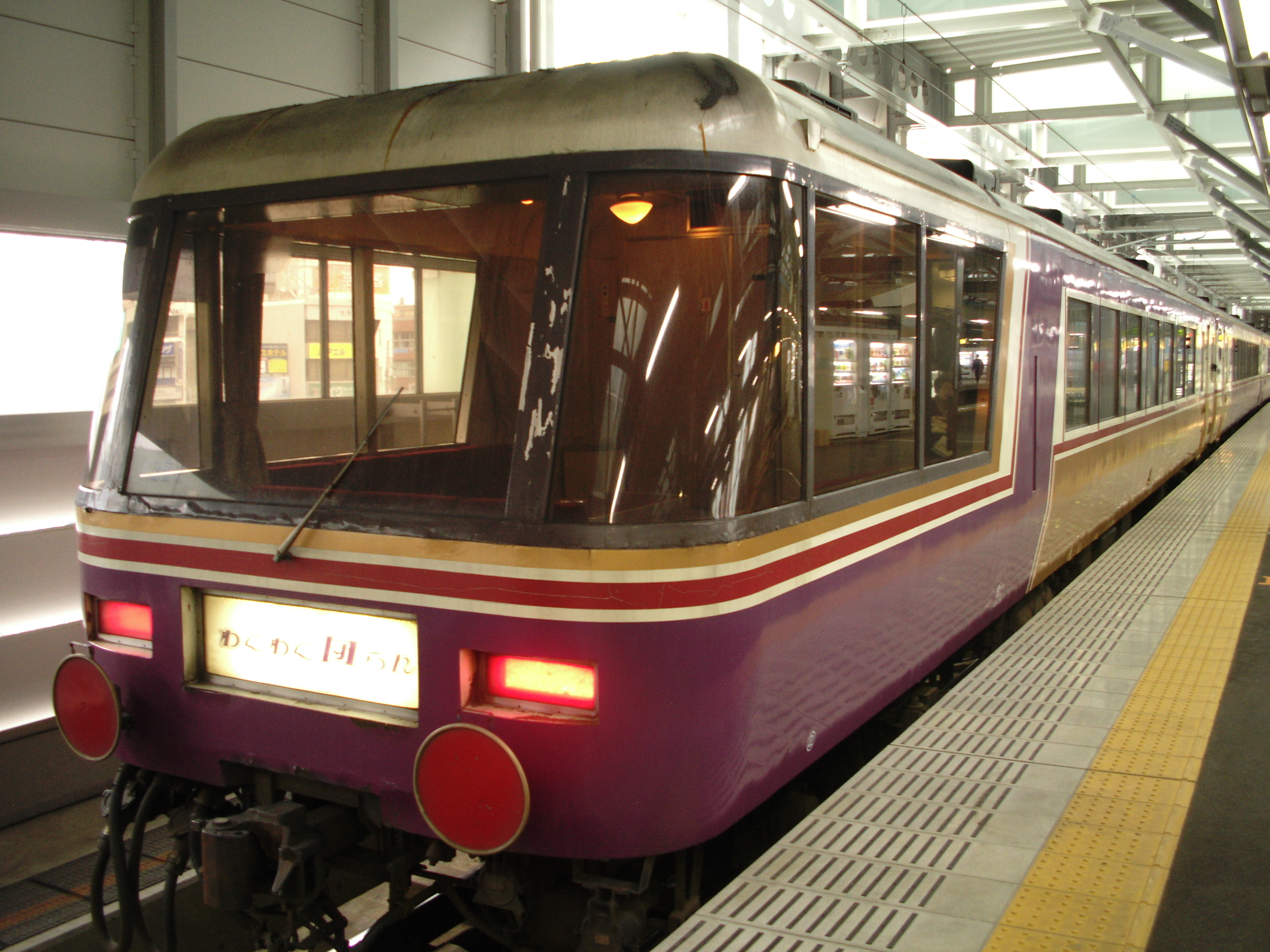
Wakuwaku Danran

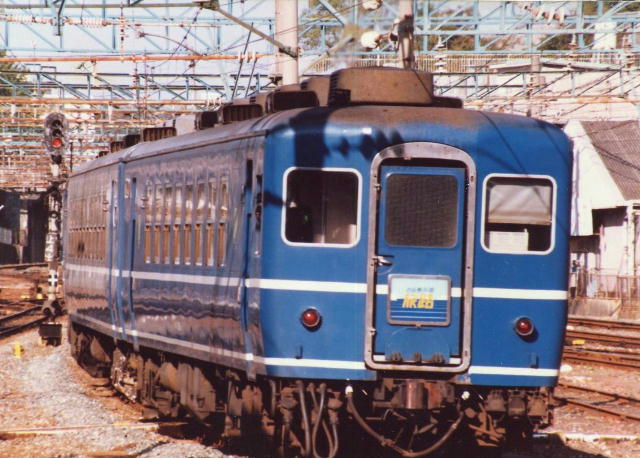
Tabiji prior to refurbishment

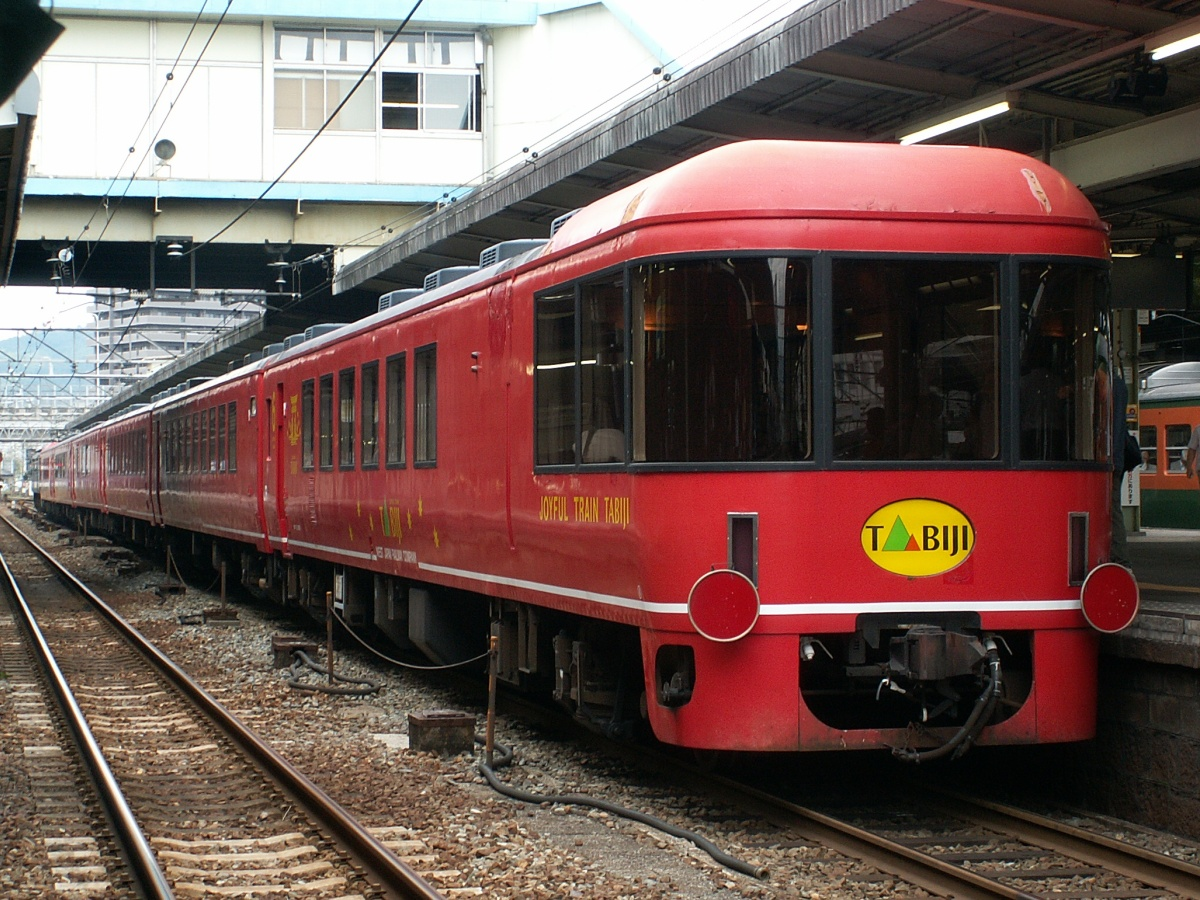
Tabiji after refurbishment. Photo taken on its final run in September 2007

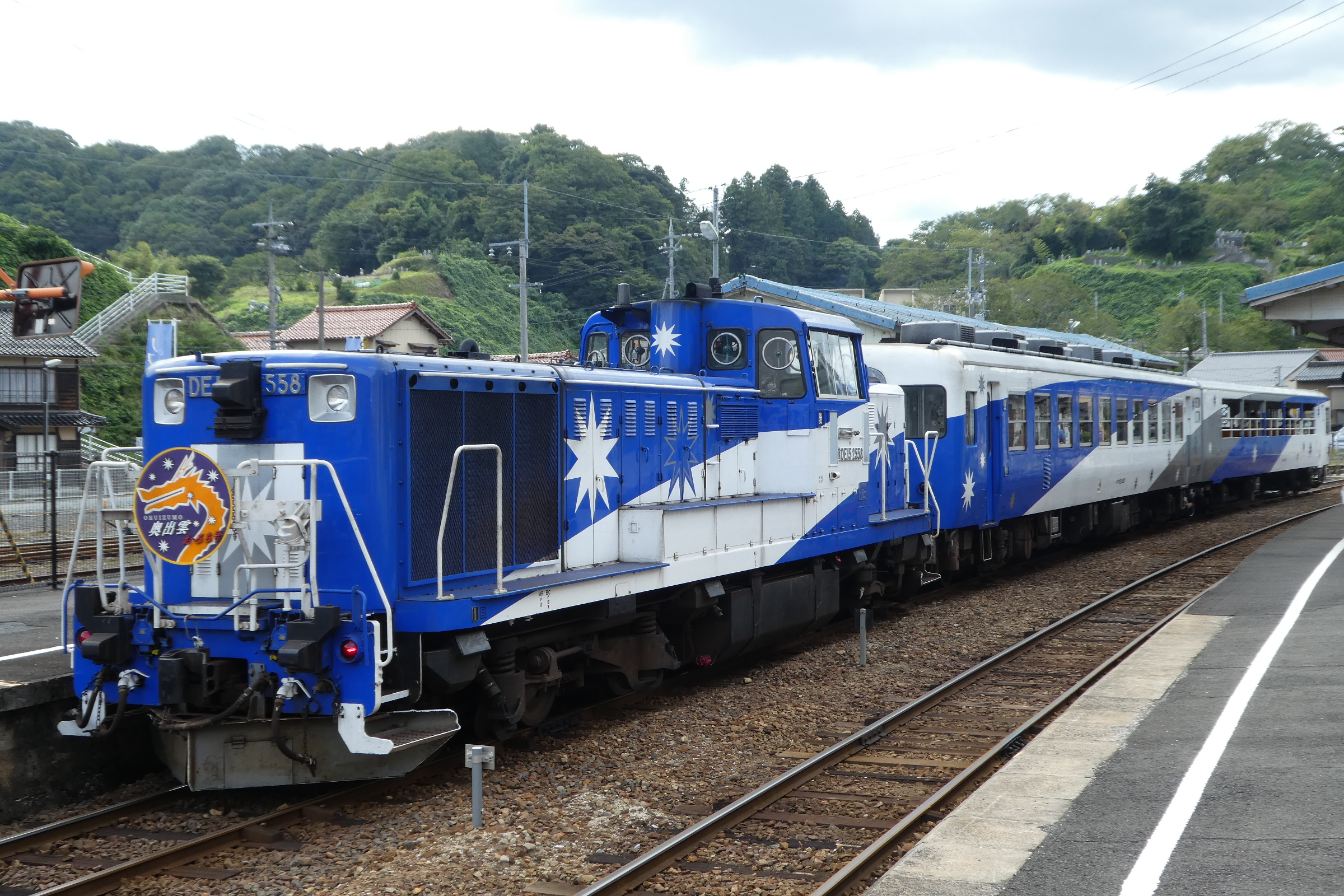
Okuizumo Orochi in 2017

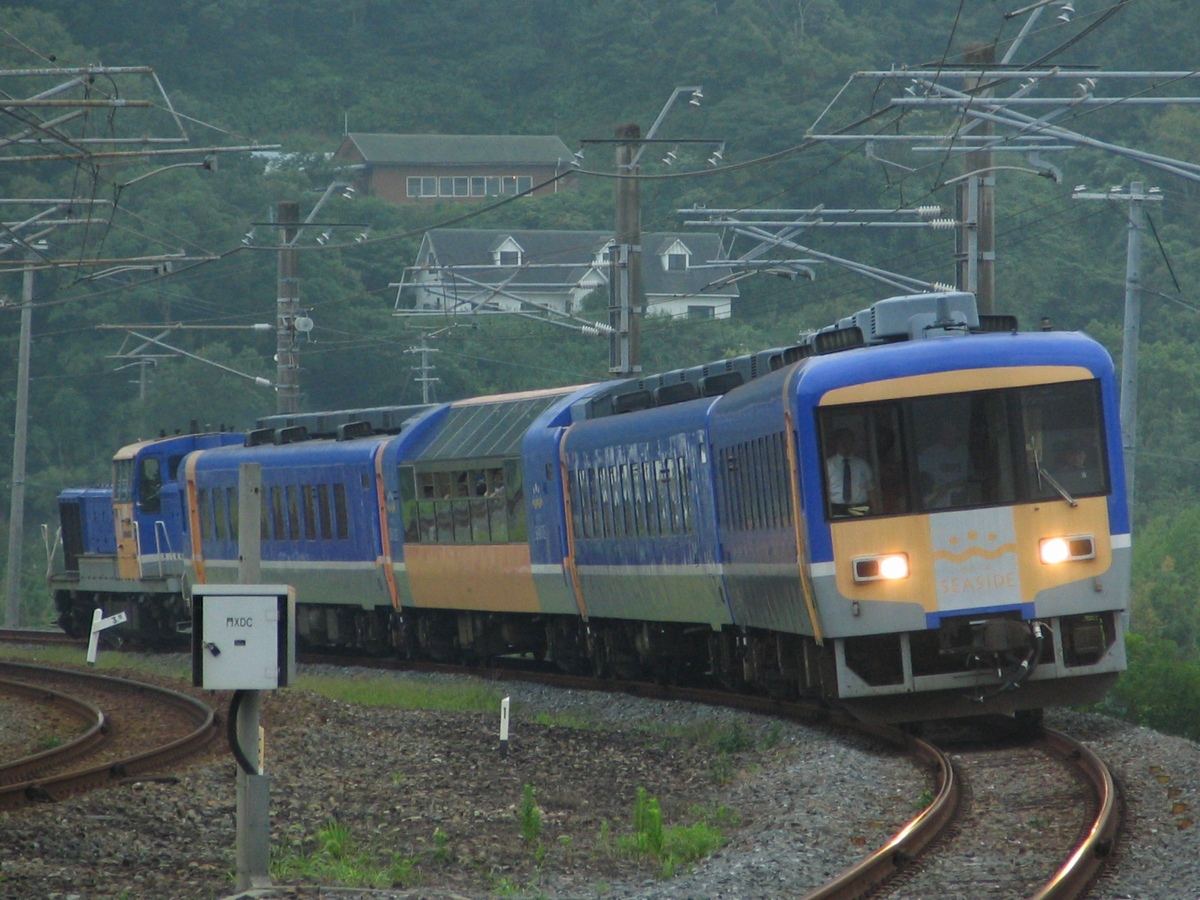
Kinokuni Sea Side

=== JR Shikoku ===
==== DMU ====
Name	Japanese	Classification	No. of cars	Accommodation	Introduced	Withdrawn	Converted from	Depot/region	Remarks
Island Express Shikoku II	アイランドエクスプレス四国II	KiHa 185 series	4 -> 3	Seating	August 1999	2021	KiHa 185 series	Takamatsu	KiRo 186 4 + KiRo 186 8 + KiHa 185 11 + KiHa 185 12. KiRo 186 4 was converted to Shikoku Mannaka Sennen Monogatari car in January 2017. Ceased operations in March 2020 but officially withdrawn in March 2021 following the conversion of KiRo 186 8 into Iyonada Monogatari car. KiHa 185 11 and KiHa 185 12 retain their decals and resumed operation as regular trains.
Iyonada Monogatari (KiHa 47)	伊予灘ものがたり	KiHa 47	2	Seating	2014	2021	KiHa 47 series	Tadotsu	Replaced by a KiHa 185 based train with the same name.
Tabidachi	旅立ち	KiHa 58 Series	4	Seating	1988	?	KiHa 58 series	Takamatsu	Modified to accommodate group excursions over the Great Seto Bridge.
Rainbow	レインボー	KiHa 58 Series	4	Seating	1988	?	KiHa 58 series	Takamatsu	Painted in JR Shikoku corporate colours. Equipped with a train radio compatible to lines in Honshu, as it was planned for the train to be able to operate there in group operations.
Cycle Train	サイクル列車	KiHa 58 Series	1	Seating	July 1999	August 1999	KiHa 58 series	Takamatsu	The entirety of KiHa 58-770 was repurposed to hold bikes. Bike racks replaced seats as bike decals were painted onto the sides. Passengers rode in an attached KiHa 32 series car.

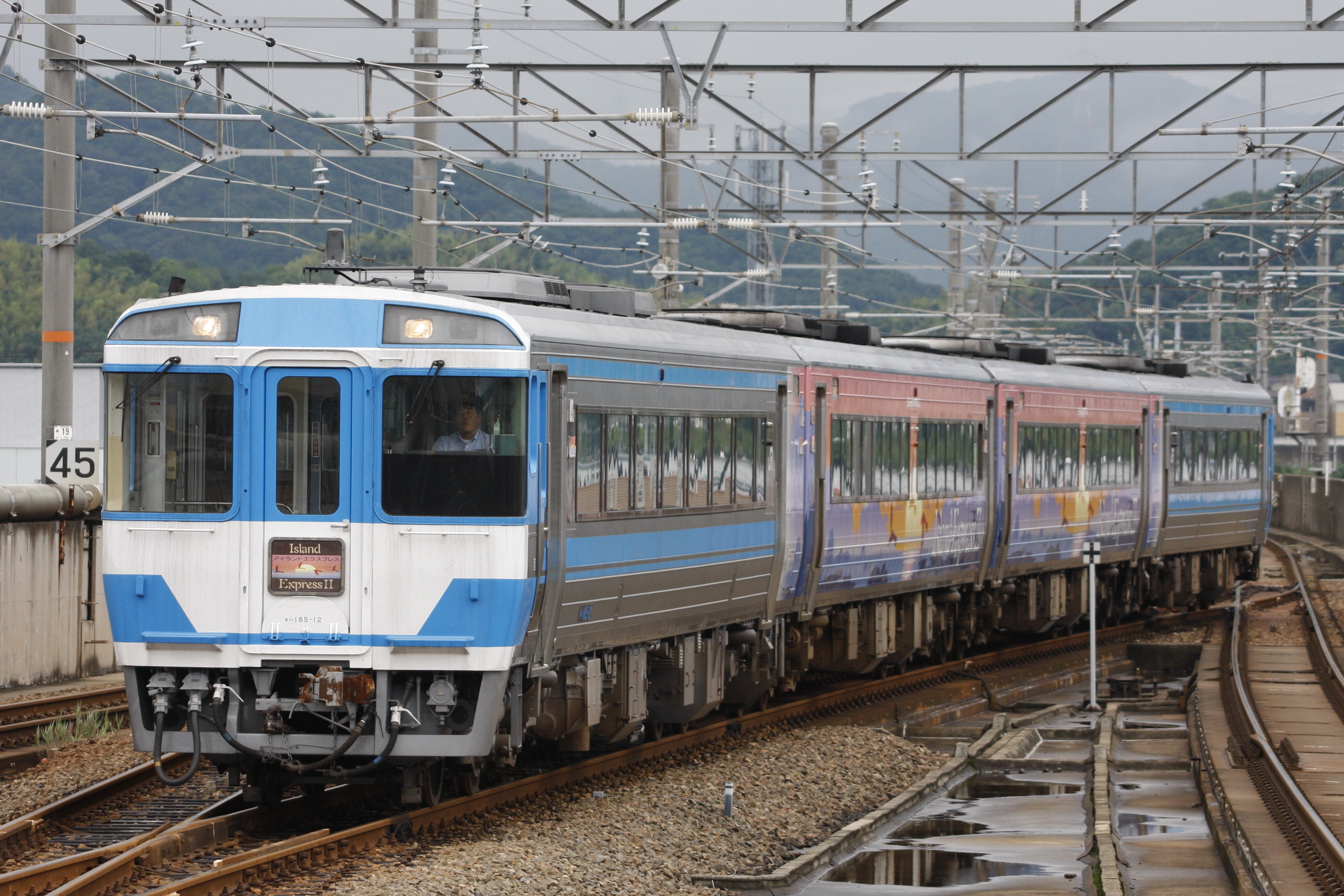
Island Express Shikoku II

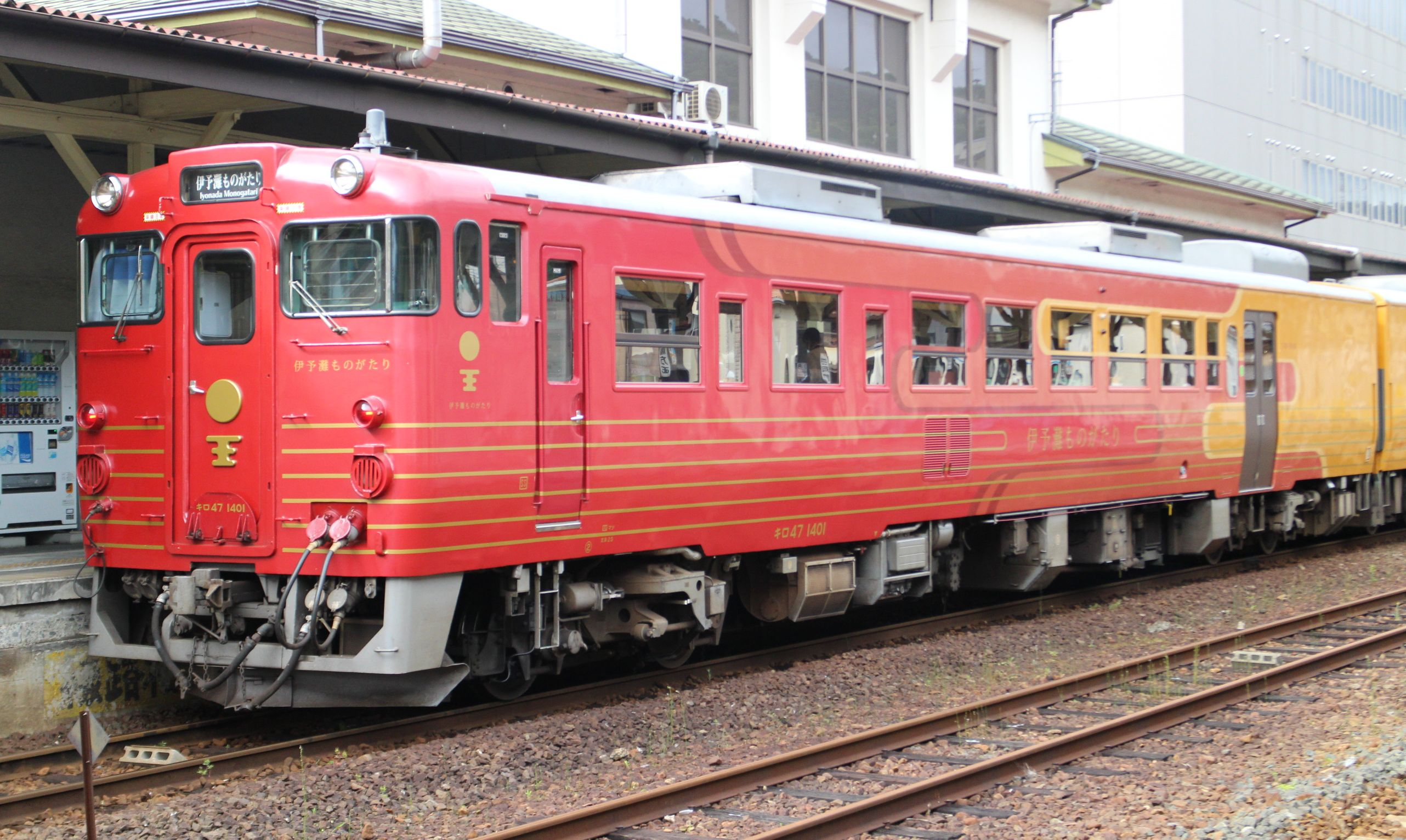
Iyonada Monogatari

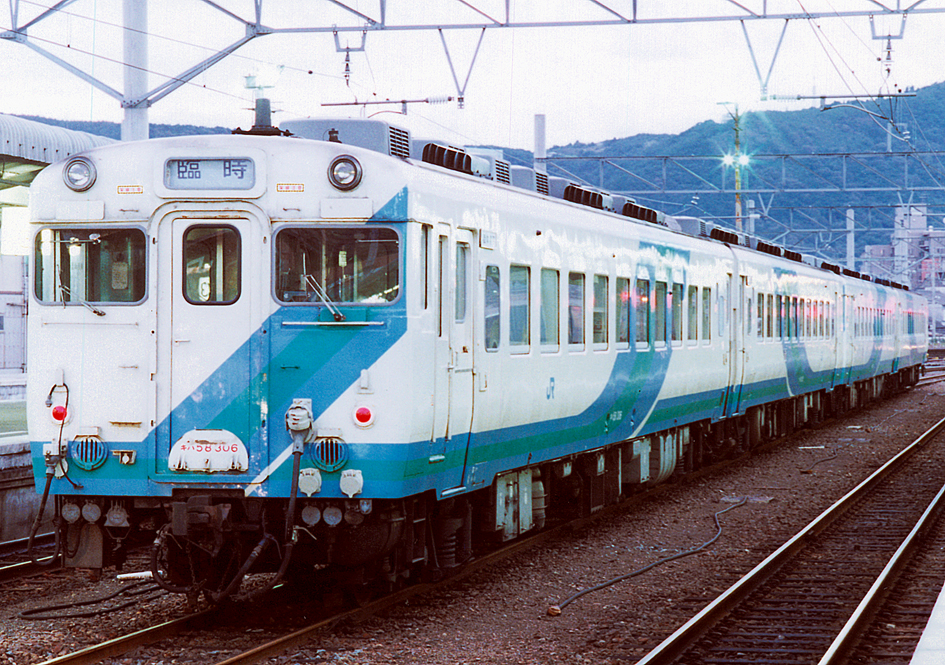
Tabidachi

==== Loco hauled ====
Name	Japanese	Classification	No. of cars	Accommodation	Introduced	Withdrawn	Converted from	Depot/region	Remarks
Island Express Shikoku	アイランドエクスプレス四国	JNR 50 series	5	Seating	March 1987	May 1999	50 series	Takamatsu	Has 3 dedicated locomotives.

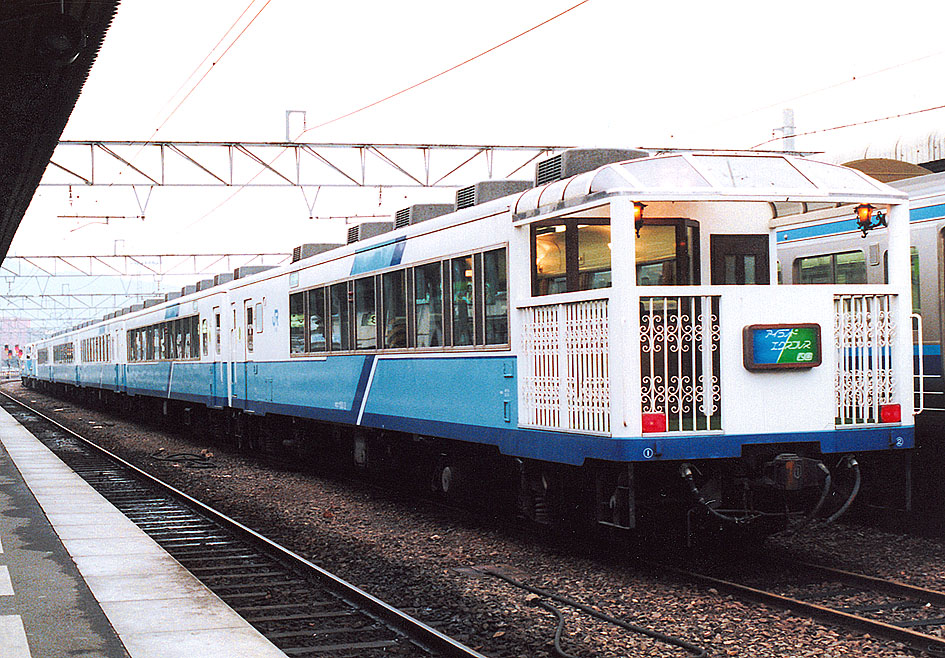
Island Express Shikoku

=== JR Kyushu ===
==== DMU ====
Name	Japanese	Classification	No. of cars	Accommodation	Introduced	Withdrawn	Converted from	Depot/region	Remarks
Aqua Express	アクアエクスプレス	KiHa 58 series	3	Seating	1988	2002	KiHa 58/28 series	Hakata -> Kumamoto	After 1994 when JR Kyushu withdrew all Joyful Train services, the set was moved to Kumamoto and ran local services on the Hohi Line before being scrapped in 2002.
Aso 1962	あそ1962	KiHa 58 series	2	Seating	July 2006	26 December 2010	KiHa 58 series	Kumamoto	After withdrawal, the train was dumped in Kumamoto Yard until scrapped in 2018
Hayato no Kaze	はやとの風	KiHa 47/147	3 (peak hours, initial), 2 (regular, final)	Seating	March 2004	March 2022	KiHa 47	Kagoshima	Former KiHa 140 series car converted to become Ibusuki no Tamatebako car in March 2012. Rest of the train was converted to become Two Stars 4047.
Holland Village Express	オランダ村特急	KiHa 183-1000 series	4	Seating	20 March 1988	July 1992	Purpose-built	–	Operated in conjunction with 485 series Ariake EMU services between Kokura and Hakata. Converted to become Yufuin no Mori II.
Siebold	シーボルト	KiHa 183-1000 series	4	Seating	March 1999	March 2004	KiHa 183-1000 series	–	Converted from former Yufuin no Mori II. Converted to become Yufu DX. Named after German botanist Philipp Franz von Siebold.
Toro-Q	TORO-Q	KiHa 58 + ToRa 70000 + KiHa 65	5	Seating	October 2002	August 2010	KiHa 58 + ToRa 70000 + KiHa 65	–	DMU cars repainted and reverted to regular use following withdrawal of train.
Yufu DX	ゆふDX	KiHa 183-1000 series	4	Seating	March 2004	January 2011	KiHa 183-1000 series	Oita	Formerly Holland Village Express, Yufuin no Mori II, and Siebold. Withdrawn 10 January 2011 and converted to become Aso Boy.
Yufuin no Mori II	ゆふいんの森II	KiHa 183-1000 series	4	Seating	July 1992	March 1999	KiHa 183-1000 series	–	Converted from former Holland Village Express. Converted to become Siebold.
Isaburo / Shinpei (KiHa 47)	いさぶろう・しんぺい	KiHa 47 series	1 -> 2 -> 3 -> 2	Seating	March 2004	March 2023	KiHa 47 series	Kumamoto	KiHa 140 2125 was the initial car, and was also used as a spare car for Kawasemi Yamasemi before being converted to become a car for Two Stars 4047, relabeled as Kishi 140-4047. KiHa 47 9089 added in October 2004. KiHa 47 8159 was added in 2009. Except KiHa 140 2125, rest converted to become Kampachi / Ichiroku.
Kusenbou	九千坊	KiHa 31	1	Tatami	March 1996 (as Isaburo / Shinpei), 2004 (as Kusenbou)	April 2009	KiHa 31 series	Kumamoto	Original Isaburo / Shinpei before being replaced by a KiHa 47 series based train in 2004. Replaced by SL Hitoyoshi in 2009.
Kawasemi Yamasemi	かわせみ やませみ	KiHa 47	2	Seating	2017	2025	KiHa 47	-	
Kitchomu	吉四六	KiHa 58	2	Mixed	1985	1993	KiHa 28/58	Oita	Kiha 58 190 has a tatami interior, while Kiha 28 2487's interior is half seating, half tatami. Converted from a Rakuda set, and it was later known as Joyful Train Oita before being combined into the Shiranui.
Yutopia	ゆ〜とぴあ	KiHa 58	2	Mixed	1987	1993	KiHa 28/58	Oita	Frontmost passenger doors were removed, with large windows in its place. Converted from a Rakuda set, it was later combined into the Shiranui.
Shiranui	しらぬい	KiHa 58	2	Tatami	1993	1994	KiHa 28/58	Oita	Combined from Kiha 58 190 of Joyful Train Oita and Kiha 28 2436 of Yutopia, the Shiranui was intended to be an updated version of the Japanese-style tatami car. However, with JR Kyushu withdrawing group charter trains just 10 months later, the Shiranui was withdrawn and scrapped.
Sound Express Hinokuni	サウンドエクスプレスひのくに	KiHa 58 & KiHa 65	4->2	Seating	1986	1994	KiHa 58 & KiHa 65	Kumamoto	'Sound Express' nickname came from the karaoke machine installed. Equipped with reclining seats. Kiha 65 61 and Kiha 58 700 were taken out of the train in 1992 for use on Huis Ten Bosch services, and the other two cars continued in service until 1994, when they were reconverted into standard Local trains.
BUNBUN	BUNBUN	KiHa 58	2	Tatami	1987	1994	KiHa 58	Kumamoto	The train's name, BUNBUN, was painted across the front end. Withdrawn and scrapped in 1994 due to JR Kyushu abolishing group charter trains.
Joyful Train Nagasaki	ジョイフルトレイン長崎	KiHa 58 & 65	2	Seating	1988	1994	KiHa 58 & 65	Nagasaki -> Kumamoto	Renamed to Joyful Train Kumamoto when the train was transferred there in 1992. Withdrawn and scrapped in 1994 due to JR Kyushu abolishing group charter trains.
Saloon Express	サルーンエクスプレス	KiHa 58 & 65	2	Seating	1988	1994	KiHa 58 & 65	Kumamoto	Withdrawn and scrapped in 1994 due to JR Kyushu abolishing group charter trains.
Fureai GO	ふれあいGO	KiHa 58 & 65	2	Seating	1988	1994	KiHa 58 & 65	Kitakyushu	Withdrawn and scrapped in 1994 due to JR Kyushu abolishing group charter trains.

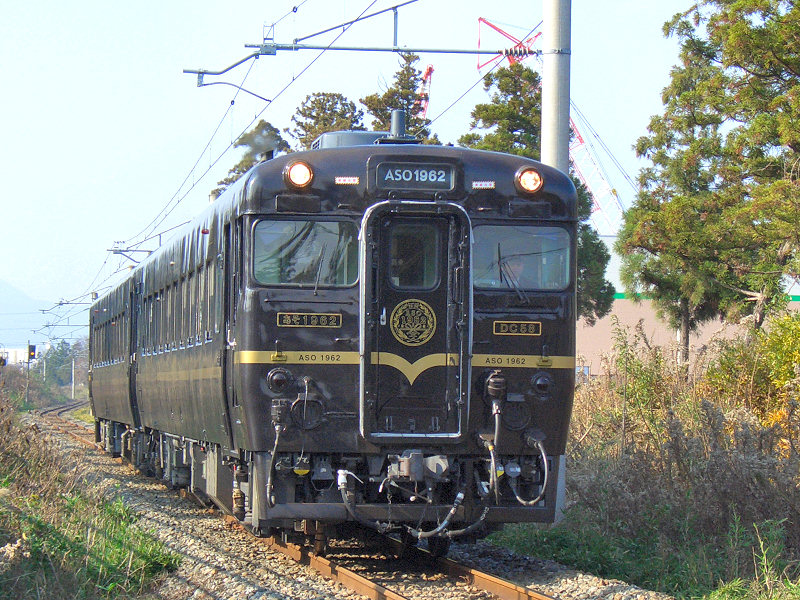
Aso 1962, December 2006

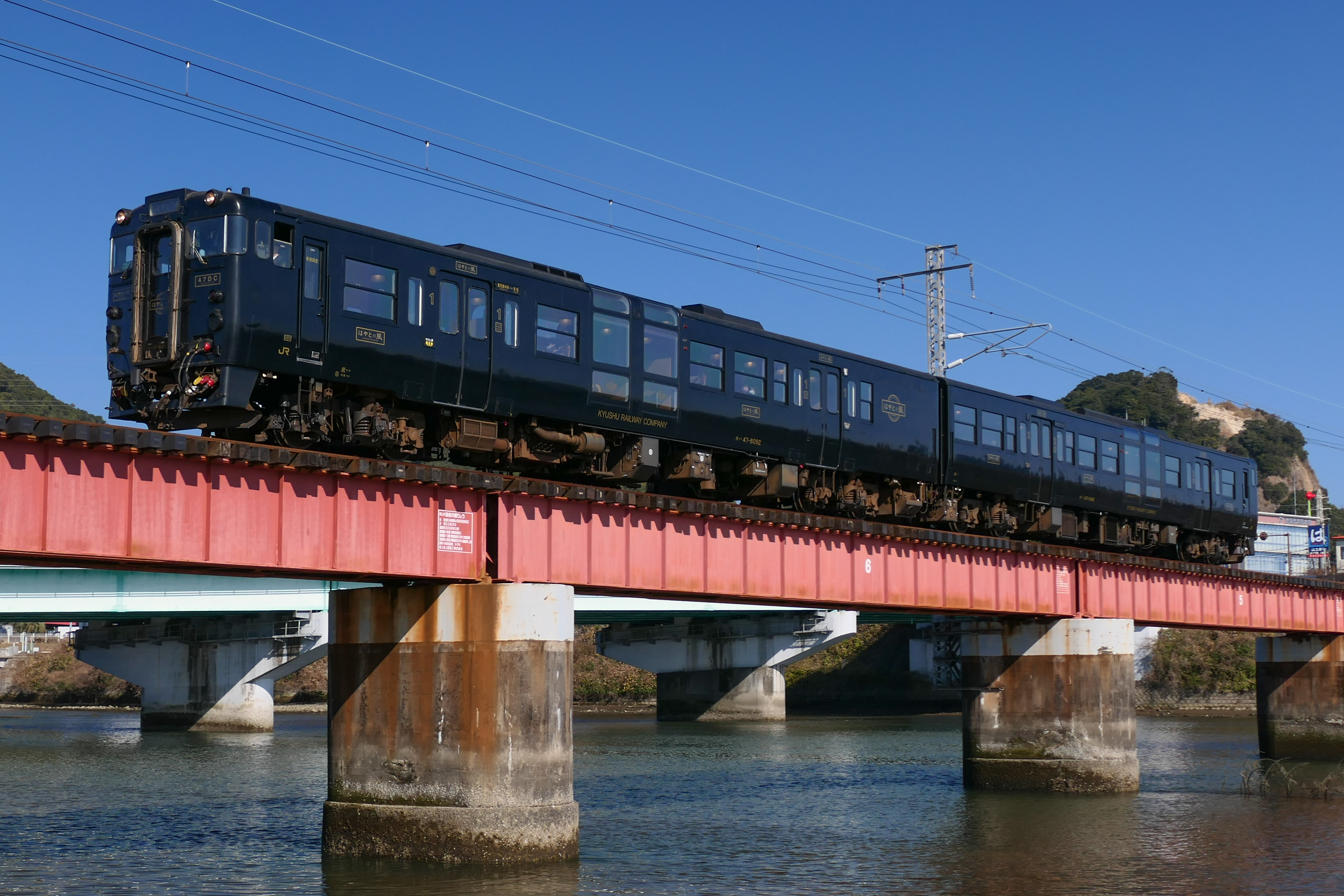
Hayato no Kaze, July 2009

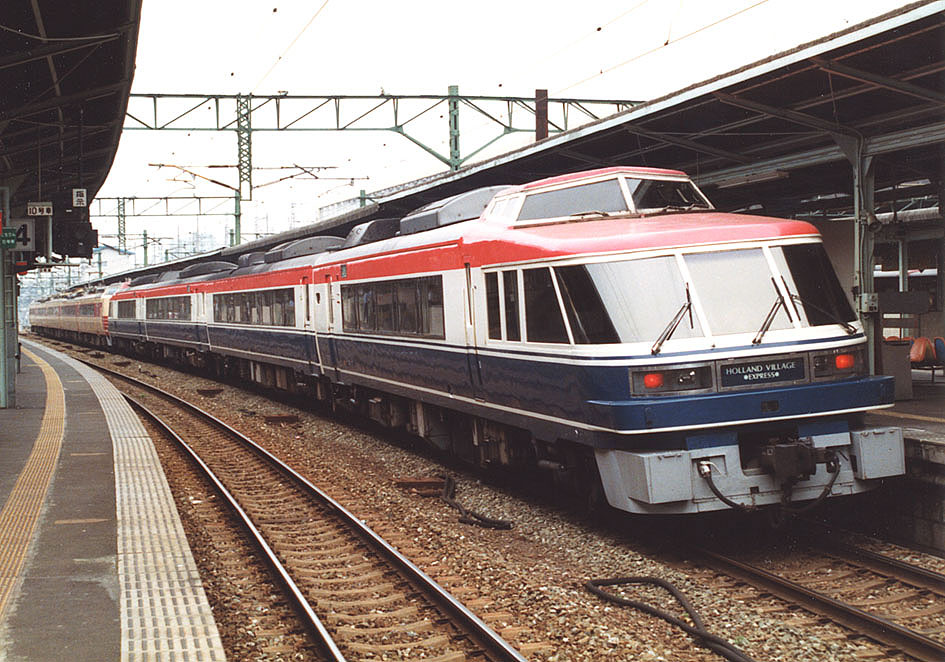
Holland Village Express KiHa 183-1000 series in 1990

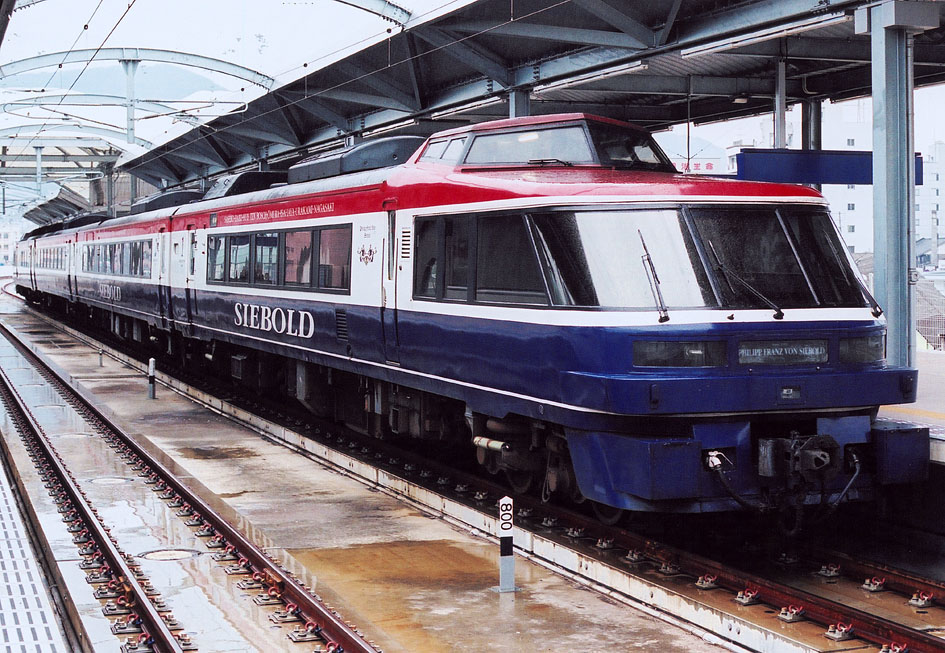
Siebold KiHa 183-1000 series in 2000

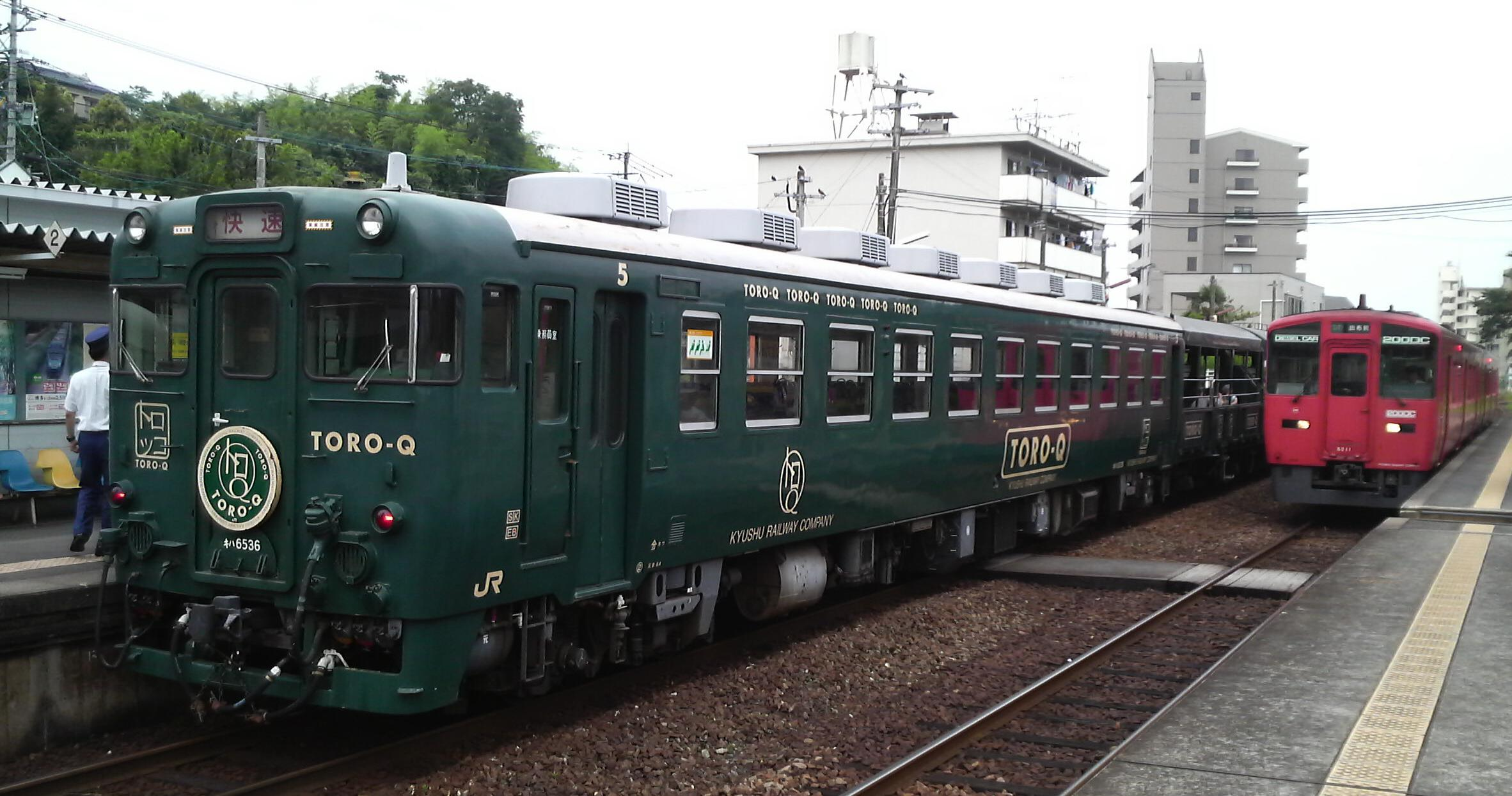
Toro-Q set led by KiHa 65 36 in July 2008

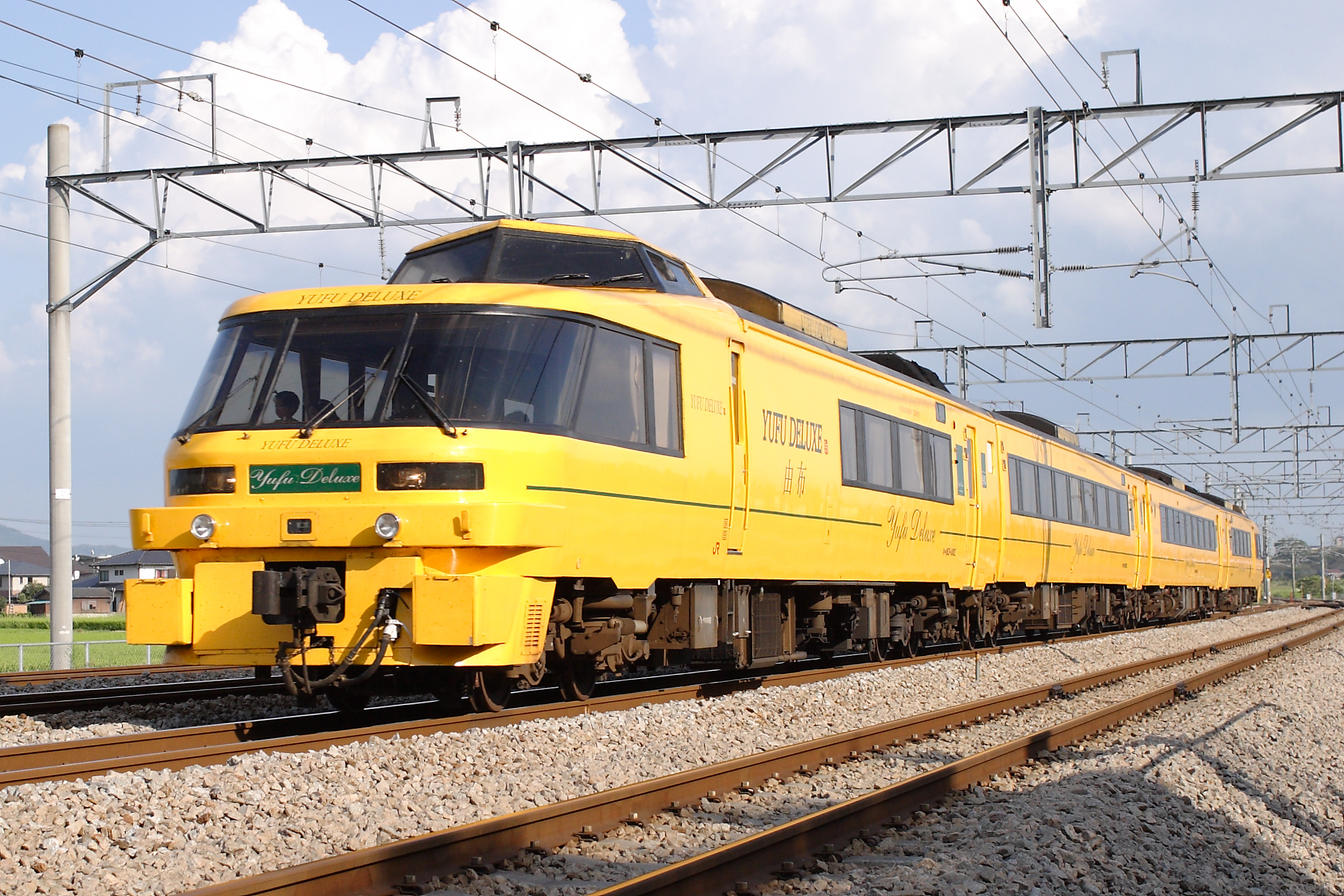
Yufu DX in September 2009

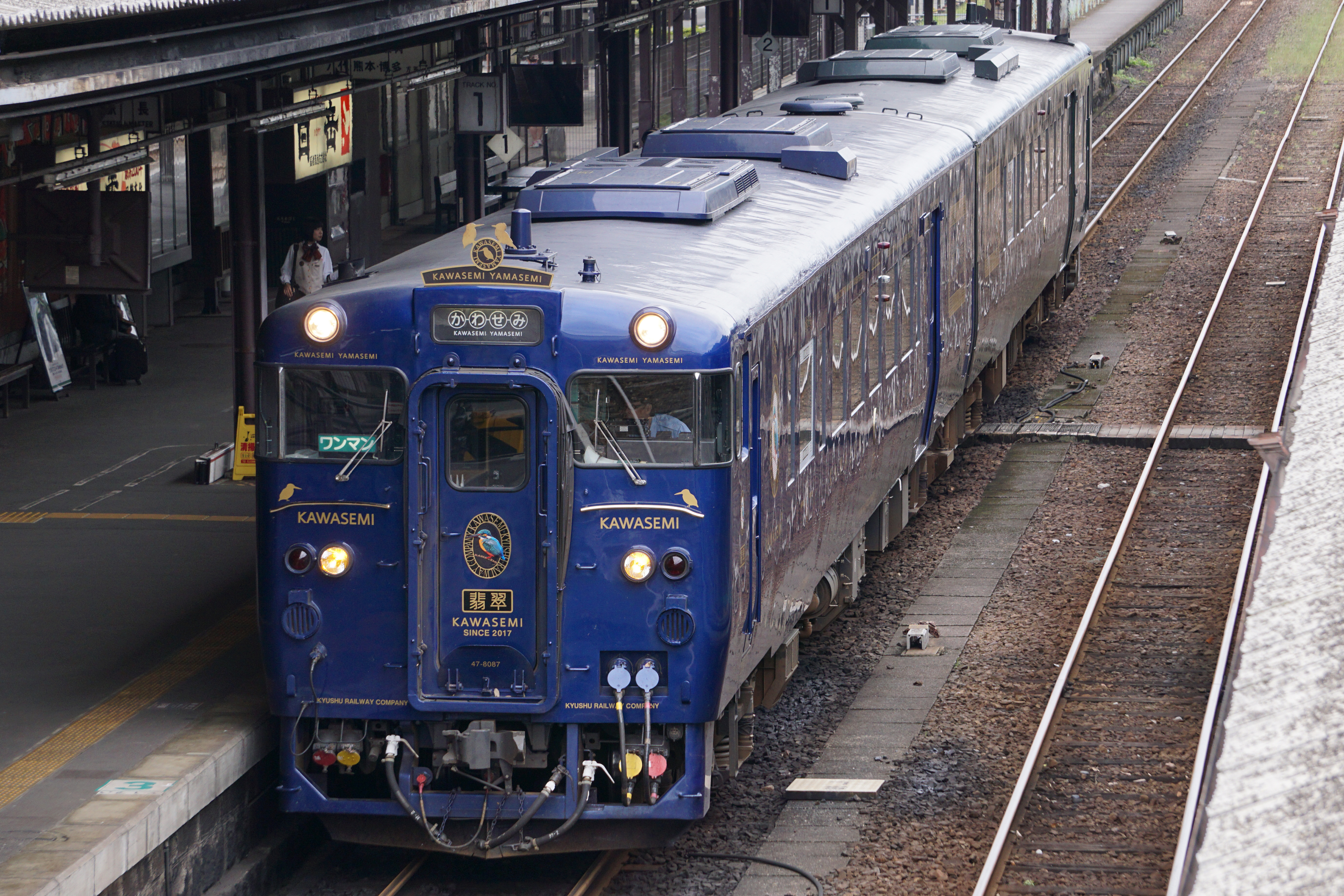
Kawasemi Yamasemi

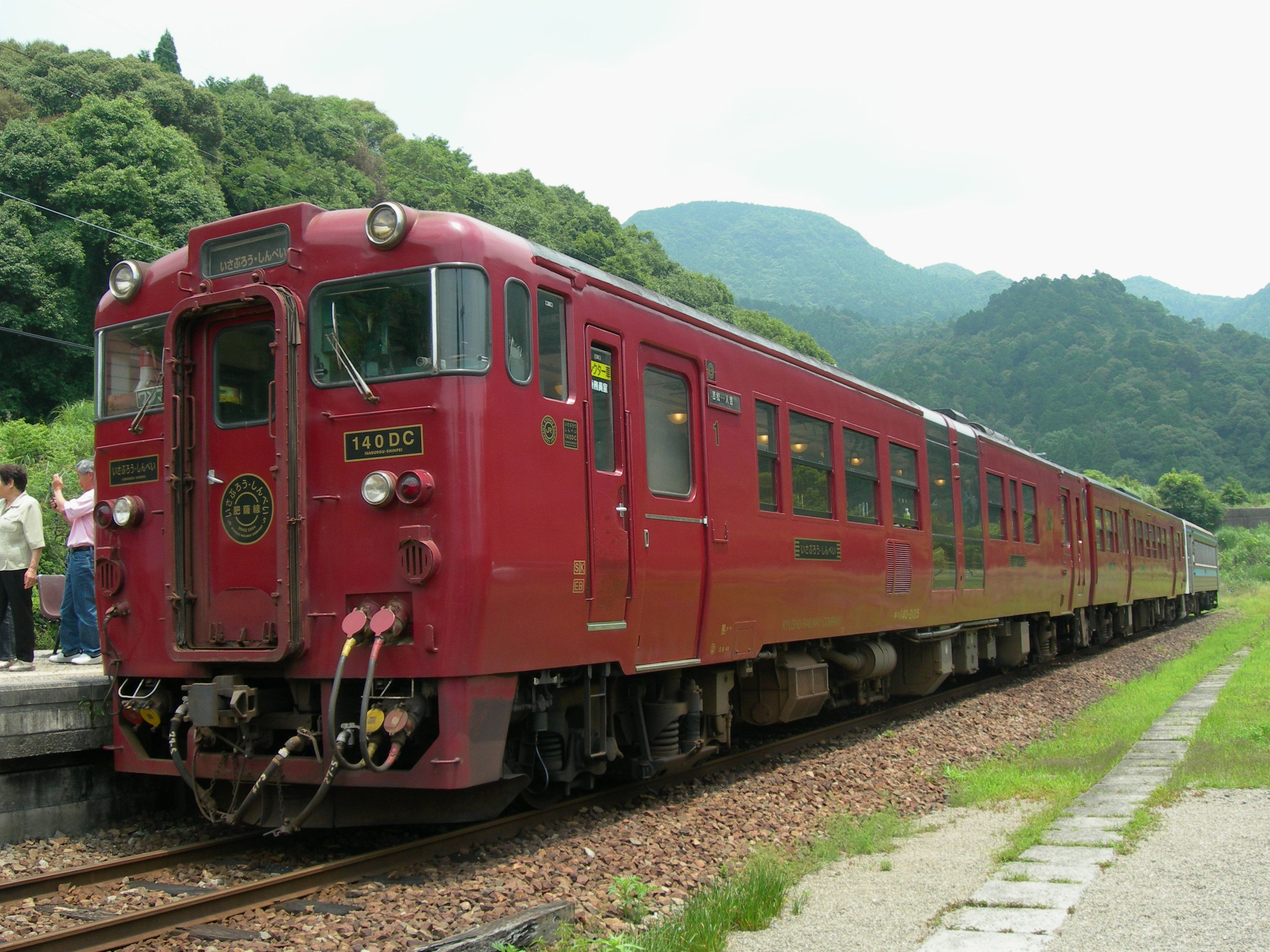
Isaburo / Shinpei

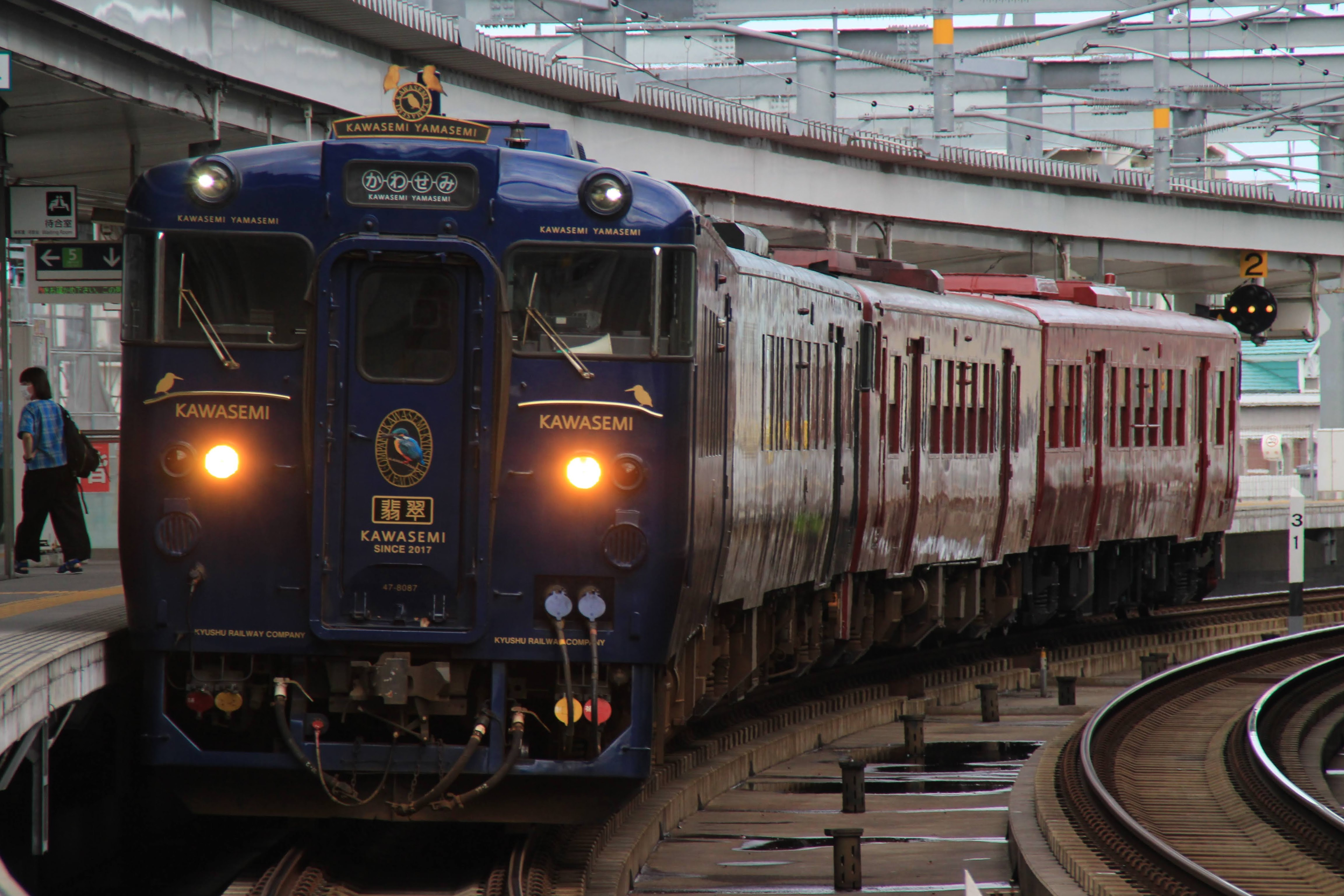
Kawasemi Yamasemi (front) and Isaburo / Shinpei (rear) coupled together in 2020

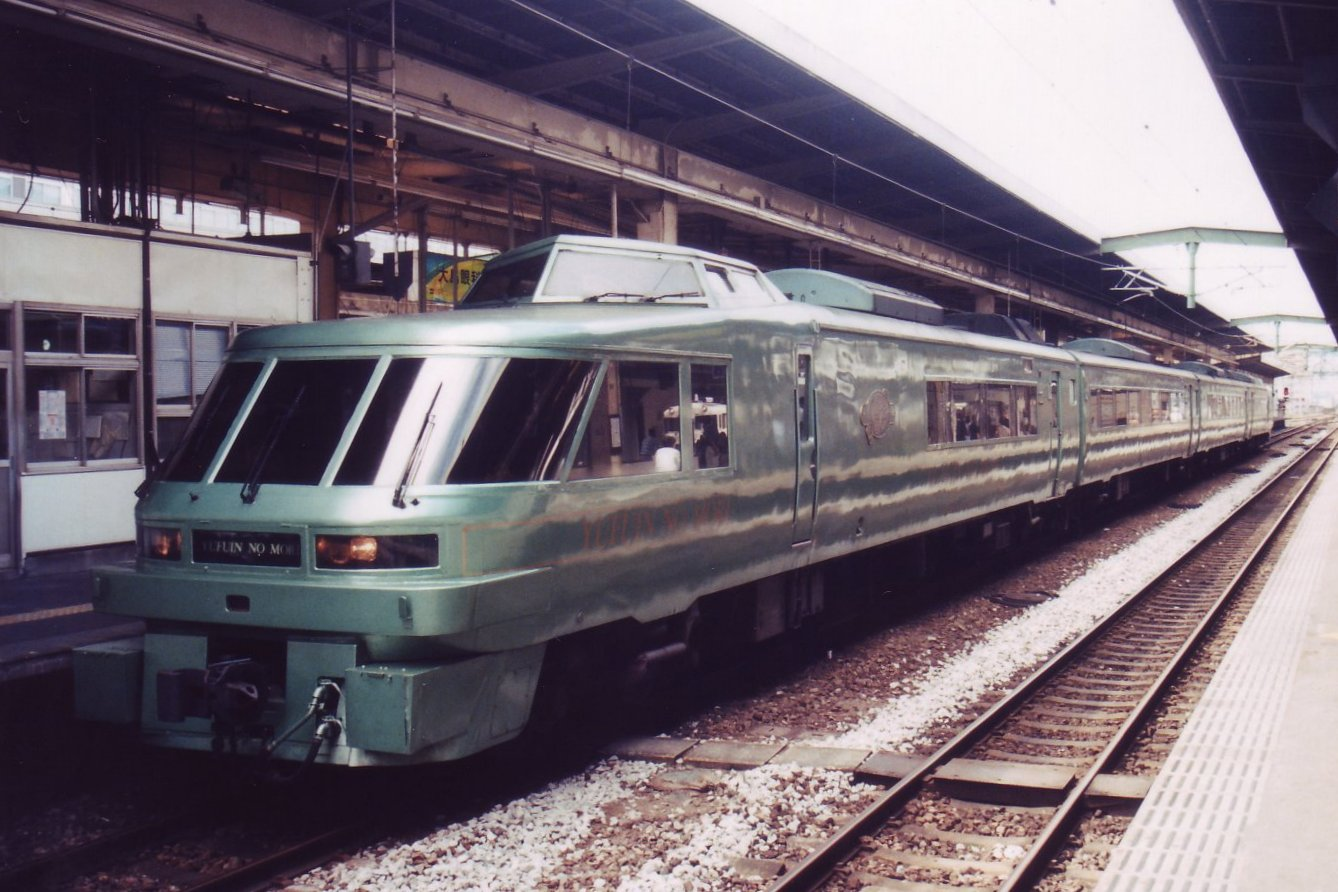
Yufuin no Mori II KiHa 183-1000 series in July 1998

==== Loco hauled ====
Name	Japanese	Classification	No. of cars	Accommodation	Introduced	Withdrawn	Converted from	Depot/region	Remarks
Panorama Liner Southern Cross	パノラマライナーサザンクロス	12 series	6	Seating	March 1987	March 1994	12 series	Mojiko	
SL Aso Boy	SLあそBOY	JNR 50 series	3	Seating	August 1988	2005	50 series	Kumamoto	The train is nicknamed SL Hitoyoshi due to the engine's former static preservation location in Hitoyoshi. The steam engine used for the SL Aso Boy service broke down in August 2005, necessitating repairs and was eventually replaced by a JNR DE10 series diesel locomotive for the rest of the year as the DL Aso Boy, and later, the SL Aso Boy was entirely replaced by Aso 1962 and the current Aso Boy service. Out of service due to repairs until 2009, the train was brought back into service as the SL Hitoyoshi.
SL Hitoyoshi	SL人吉	JNR 50 series	3	Seating	2009	March 2024	50 series	Kumamoto	In 2009, the SL Hitoyoshi name is made official. Ran as SL Kimetsu no Yaiba in 2020 as collaboration with the movie. Due to the age of the locomotive, JR Kyushu withdrew the SL Hitoyoshi from service on March 23, 2024, and its locomotive, JNR 58654, was placed on static display in front of JR Hitoyoshi Station.

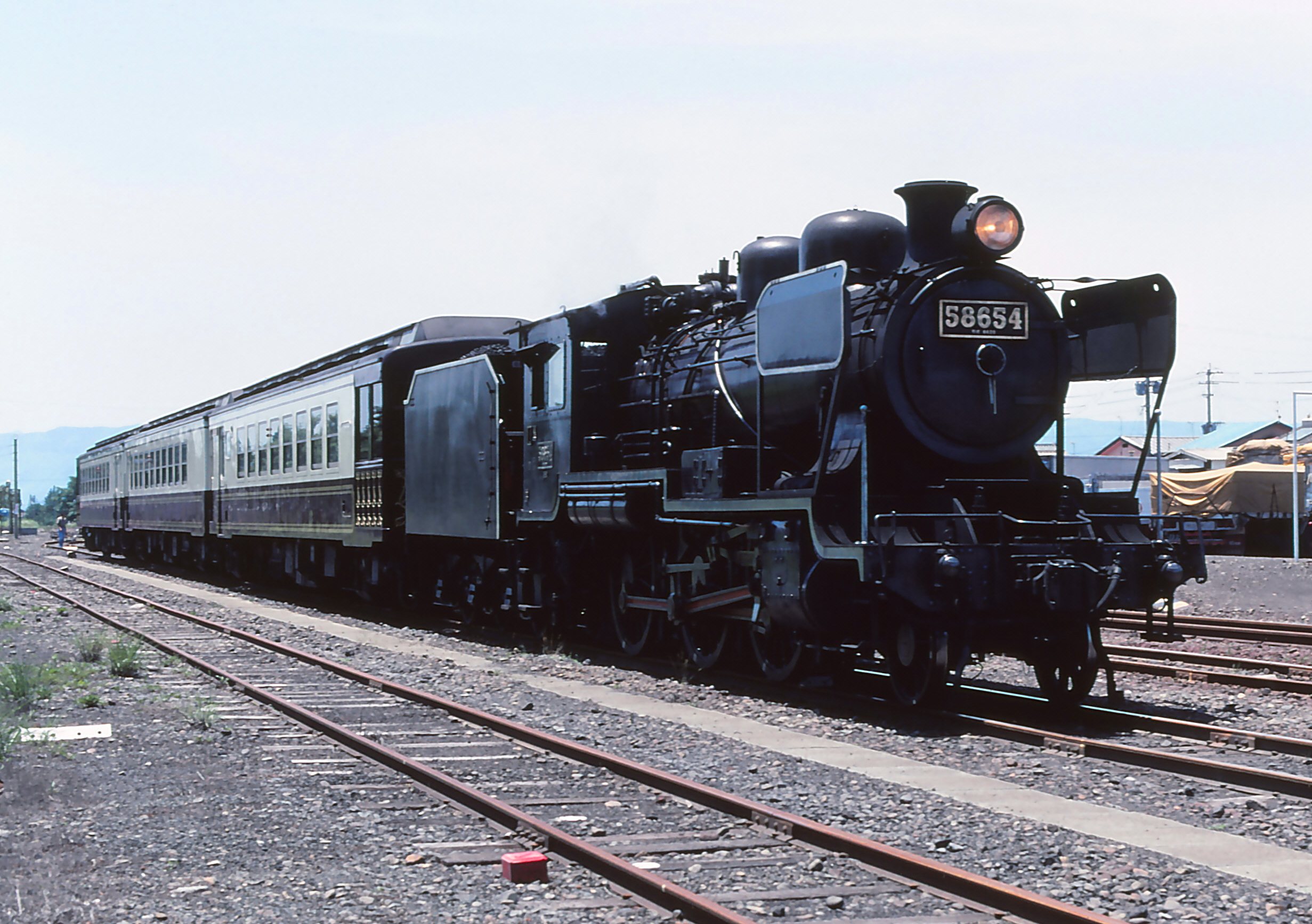
SL Aso Boy

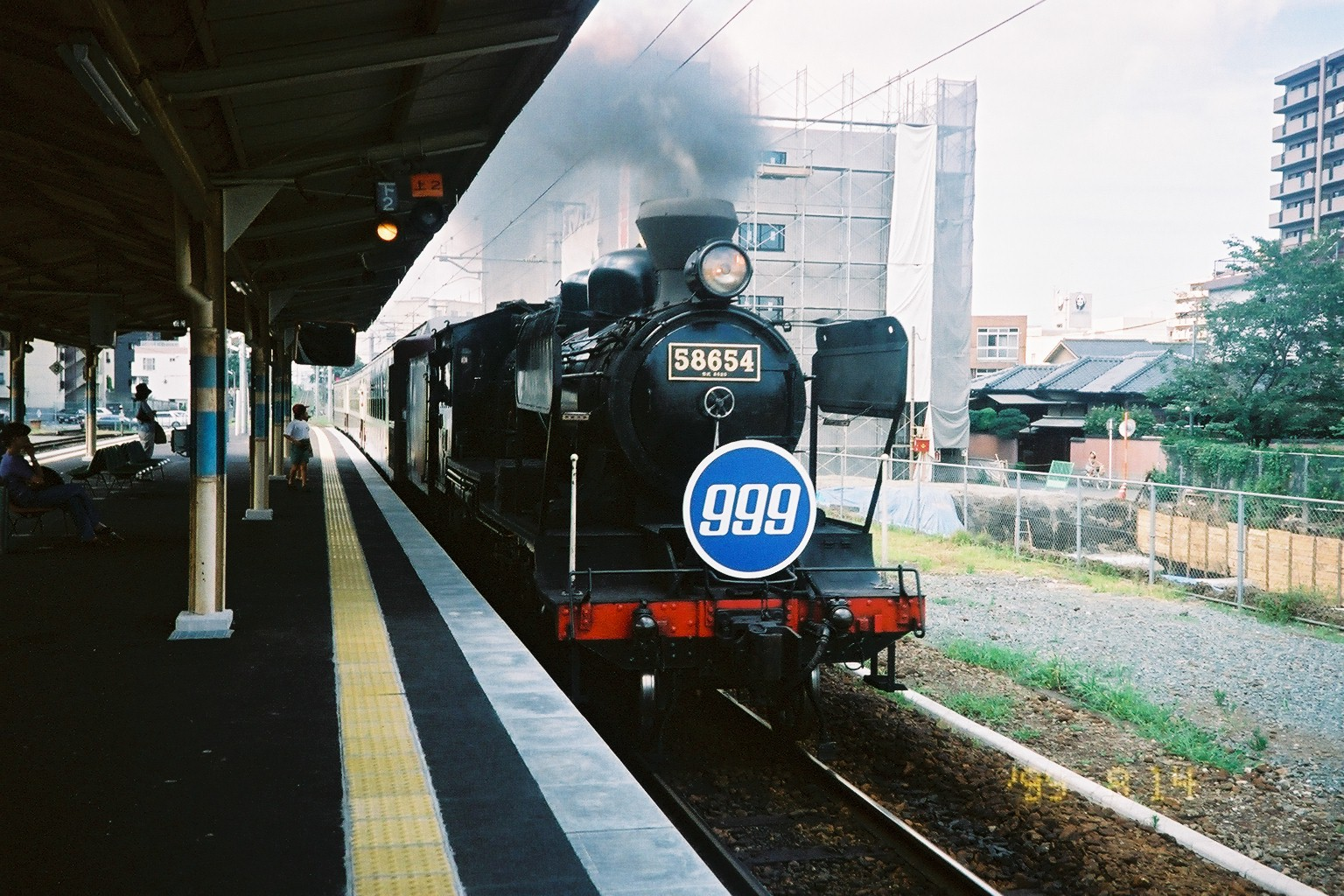
SL Aso Boy converted to look like Galaxy Express 999 at Suizenji Station

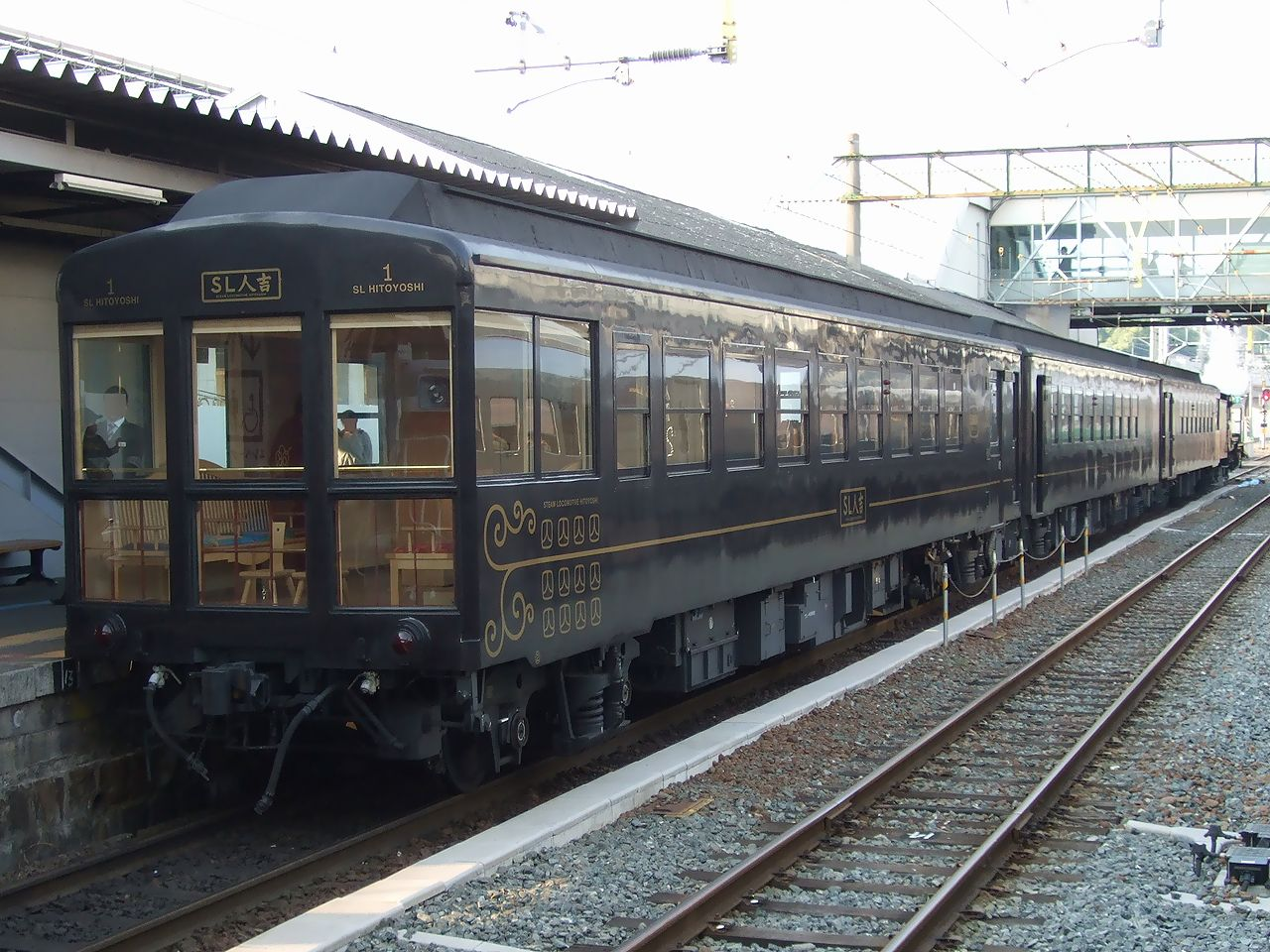
SL Hitoyoshi

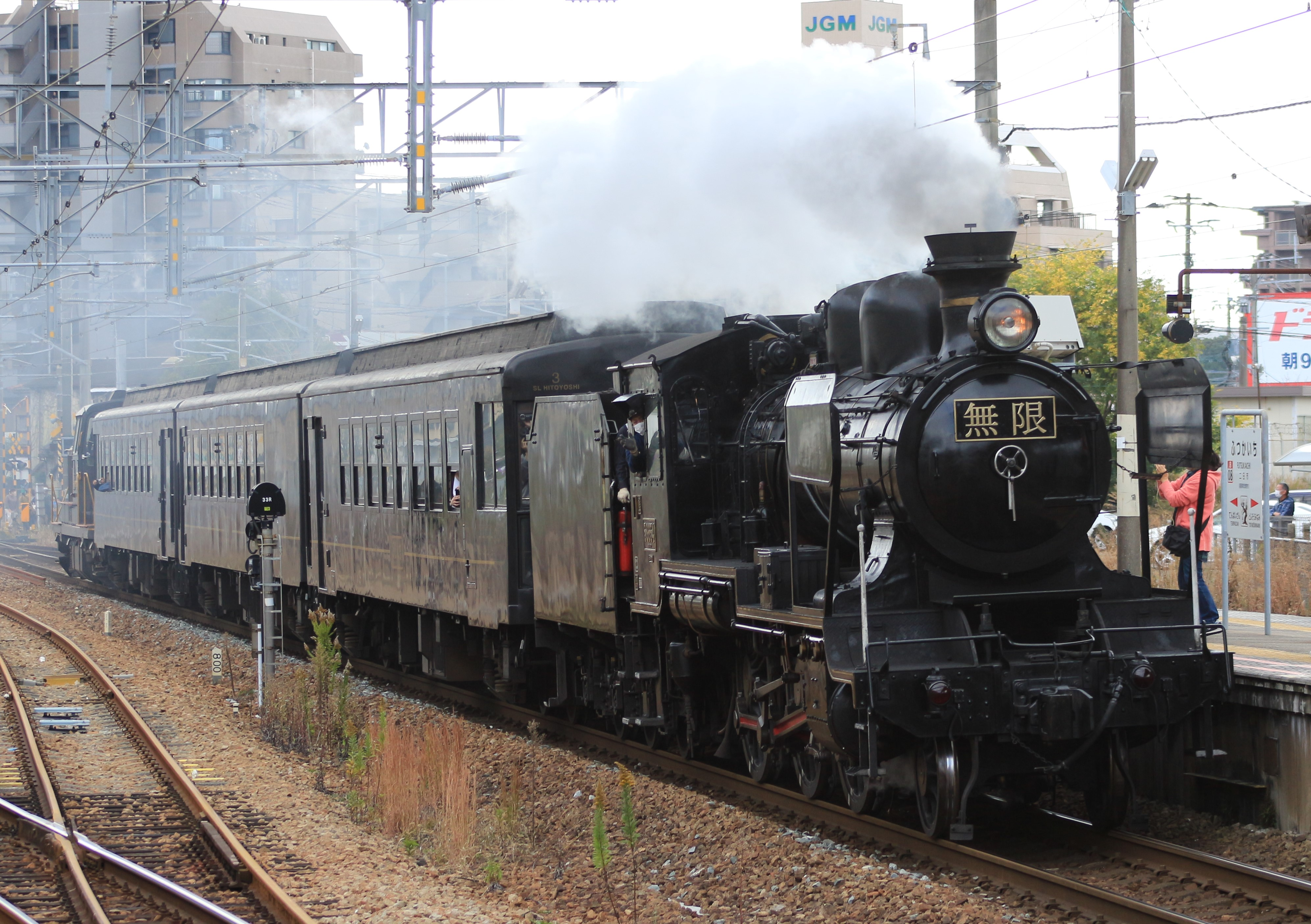
SL Hitoyoshi as SL Kimetsu no Yaiba

== See also ==
- Excursion train
- Japan Railways locomotive numbering and classification
