= List of mergers in Kagoshima Prefecture =

Here is a list of mergers in Kagoshima Prefecture, Japan since the Heisei period.

== Mergers from April 1, 1999 to present ==
- On October 12, 2004 – The city of Sendai was merged with the towns of Hiwaki, Iriki, Kedōin and Tōgō, and the villages of Kamikoshiki, Kashima, Sato and Shimokoshiki (all from Satsuma District) were all merged to create the city of Satsumasendai. (Merger Information Page)
- On November 1, 2004 – The towns of Kōriyama and Matsumoto (both from Hioki District), the town of Kiire (from Ibusuki District), and the towns of Sakurajima and Yoshida (both from Kagoshima District) were merged into the expanded city of Kagoshima.
- On March 22, 2005 – The towns of Miyanojō and Tsuruda (both from Satsuma District) were merged into the expanded town of Satsuma (former name: 薩摩町; current name: さつま町). (Merger Information Page)
- On March 22, 2005 – The towns of Kurino and Yoshimatsu (both from Aira District) were merged to create the town of Yūsui.
- On March 22, 2005 – The towns of Ōnejime and Tashiro (both from Kimotsuki District) were merged to create the town of Kinkō.
- On March 31, 2005 – The towns of Nejime and Sata (both from Kimotsuki District) were merged to create the town of Minamiōsumi.
- On May 1, 2005 – The towns of Fukiage, Higashiichiki, Hiyoshi and Ijūin (all from Hioki District) were merged to create the city of Hioki.
- On July 1, 2005 – The towns of Kōyama and Uchinoura (both from Kimotsuki District) were merged to create the town of Kimotsuki.
- On July 1, 2005 – The towns of Ōsumi, Sueyoshi and Takarabe (all from Soo District) were merged to create the city of Soo.
- On October 11, 2005 – The city of Kushikino was merged with the town of Ichiki (from Hioki District) to create the city of Ichikikushikino.
- On November 7, 2005 – The former town of Kirishima absorbed the city of Kokubu, the towns of Fukuyama, Hayato, Makizono, Mizobe and Yokogawa (all from Aira District) to create the city of Kirishima.
- On November 7, 2005 – The city of Kaseda was merged with the town of Kinpō (from Hioki District), and the towns of Bonotsu, Kasasa and Ōura (all from Kawanabe District) to create the city of Minamisatsuma.
- On January 1, 2006 – The former town of Shibushi absorbed the towns of Ariake and Matsuyama (all from Soo District) to create the city of Shibushi.
- On January 1, 2006 – The old city of Ibusuki absorbed the towns of Kaimon and Yamagawa (both from Ibusuki District) to create the new and expanded city of Ibusuki.
- On January 1, 2006 – The old city of Kanoya absorbed the towns of Aira and Kushira (both from Kimotsuki District), and the town of Kihoku (from Soo District) to create the new and expanded city of Kanoya.
- On March 13, 2006 – The old city of Izumi absorbed the towns of Noda and Takaono (both from Izumi District) to create the new and expanded city of Izumi.
- On March 20, 2006 – The city of Naze was merged with the town of Kasari, and the village of Sumiyo (both from Ōshima District) to create the city of Amami.
- On March 20, 2006 – The town of Azuma (from Izumi District) was merged into the expanded town of Nagashima.
- On October 1, 2007 – The towns of Kamiyaku and Yaku (both from Kumage District) were merged to create the town of Yakushima.
- On December 1, 2007 – The town of Ei (from Ibusuki District), and the towns of Chiran and Kawanabe (both from Kawanabe District) were merged to create the city of Minamikyūshū. Ibusuki District and Kawanabe District were dissolved as a result of this merger.
- On November 1, 2008 – The city of Ōkuchi was merged with the town of Hishikari (from Isa District) to create the city of Isa. Isa District was dissolved as a result of this merger.
- On March 23, 2010 – The former town of Aira absorbed the towns of Kajiki and Kamō (all from Aira District) to create the city of Aira. Aira District was left with one municipality.
