= Izumi crane migration grounds =

Bird migration field in Kagoshima Prefecture, Japan

Coordinates: 32°06′04″N 130°16′24″E

The Izumi crane migration grounds cover a 245ha paddy field area of Izumi plain in the northwest of Kagoshima Prefecture known for the about ten-thousand cranes which pass the winter there from every year mid October to March.

== Migration ==
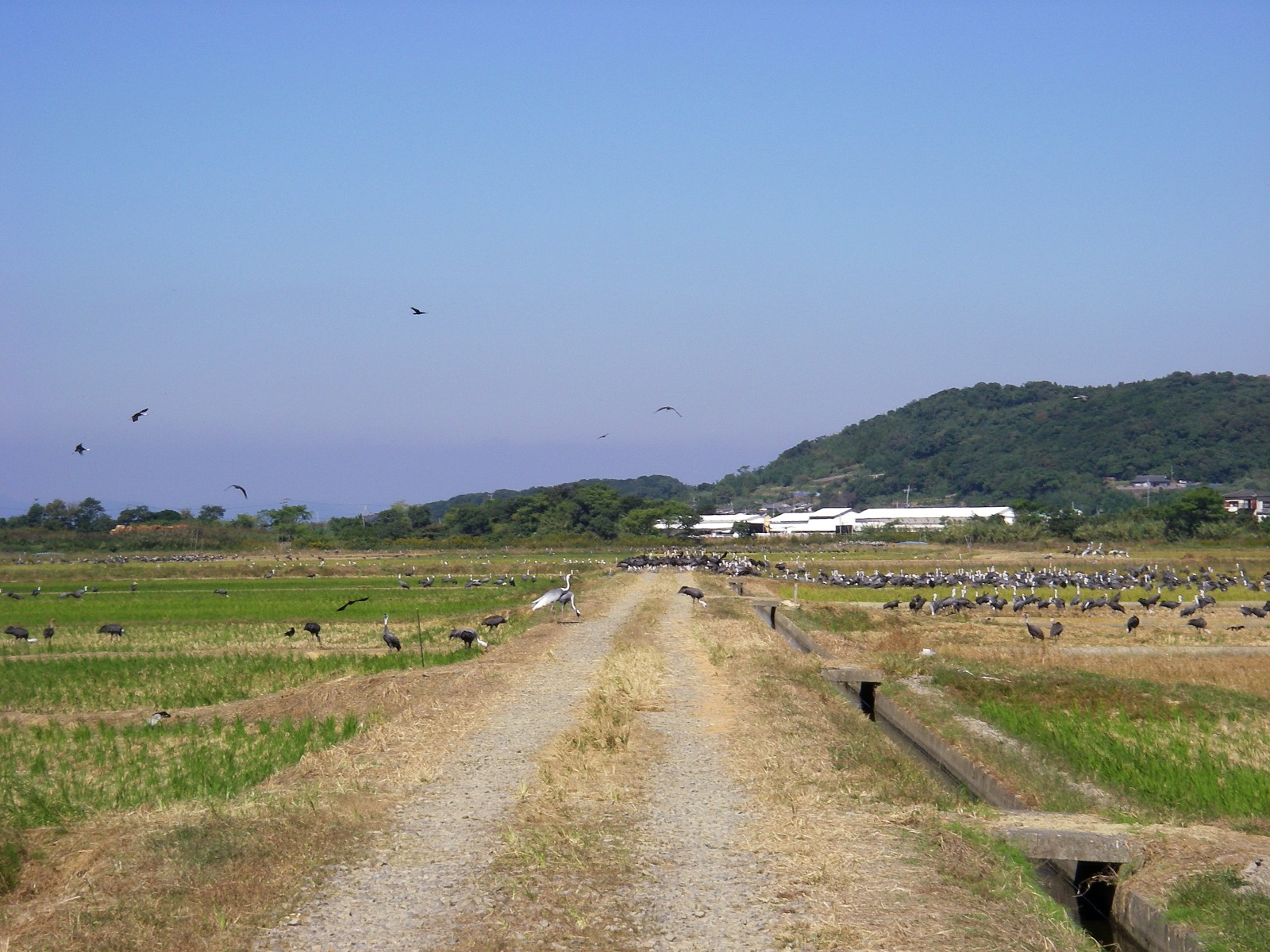
Izumi crane migration grounds

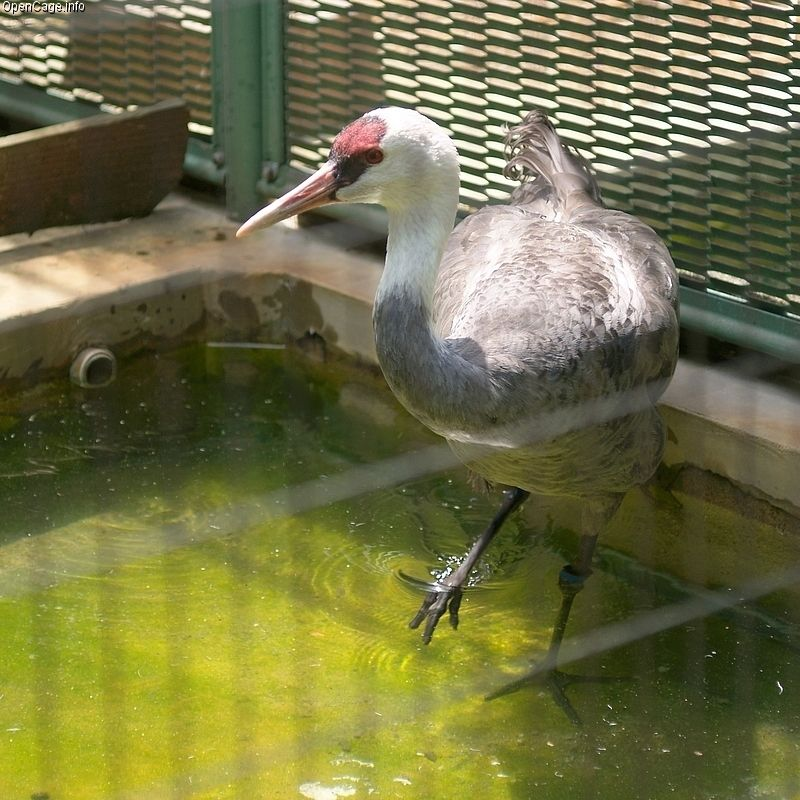
Hooded crane

The cranes come over with the north and northwest winds from mid October to mid November. Each year there are about 10,000 hooded cranes, 3,000 white-naped cranes and also small numbers of common cranes, demoiselle cranes, sandhill cranes and Siberian cranes. They pass the winter eating rice plants, cyperaceae weed, japonicus steud, eleocharis acicularis, eleocharis Kuroguwai Ohwi, potatoes, frogs, snails, viviparidae, grasshoppers and so on. People also feed them about 70 tonnes of wheat, chaff, brown rice, soybeans and so on. The cranes in Izumi are carefully protected. For example, the roosting grounds are set in marshy areas so they cannot be attacked by Japanese raccoons and Japanese mink. On the other hand, farmers in the area have had to set up guard nets around their fields so the cranes cannot damage crops. Before they leave the area, the cranes are given about 8 tonnes of sardines before heading north. They go up in a circular pattern and fly away to the north with the convection currents, which comes up by west or northwest wind on a clear day from early February to late March.

The breeding sites for the hooded cranes flying to Izumi are the marshes from Lake Baikal to the mid and upper stream of the River Amur. The cranes also winter in the Yatsushiro basin in Yamaguchi, Daegu in Korea, the marshes of Goryeong and the Korean Demilitarized Zone, the Yangtze River in China and so on. There are many cranes which change their wintering places depending on the climate conditions of the year, so the number of cranes flying to the Izumi plain changes from year to year.

== History ==
Originally, cranes passed the winter in marshes and paddies all over Japan, and were observed in many places throughout Satsuma (present-day Kagoshima) during the Edo period (1603-1868). Cranes were first observed in Izumi plain in 1694, when land was being drained near the coast. The Edo Shogunate appealed for cranes to be protected nationwide which Satsuma followed and allowing the cranes to keep coming. However, after the Meiji Restoration (1869), cranes were once being hunted again and by around 1890 no cranes were coming to Izumi. In 1895 they started to come again with the establishment of the game act and the cranes became established as an attraction on the Izumi plain served by a horse-drawn cart running to see the cranes. Kagoshima Main Line railway opened in 1923 was planned to go through the center of Izumi plain at first, but the ornithologist, Uchida Seinosuke, appealed to the Japanese Government Railways to protect the cranes, and had the route changed to go around the migration grounds. The number of the crane increased, 150-160 in 1919, 275 in 1927, and 3908 in 1939, however the number dropped to 275 in 1947 because of the navy airfield and a reduction of the protection.

After the war, the plain was designated a natural monument on 29 March 1952. In 1955 the Defense Agency planned to reuse the old naval airport but was forced to give up because of a grassroots opposition campaign. By 1963 the number of cranes coming was over one-thousand. The numbers increased sharply from 1976, when military exercises between the United States and Korea in one of the other wintering areas in Korea started. By 1992 numbers had reached over ten-thousand. Since 1987 the ‘Crane Marathon in Izumi’ has been held. On 1 November 1989 the Crane Observation Center was opened followed by the Crane Museum on 21 April 1995 ‘, both are used as awareness campaigns as well as sightseeing attractions. Also on 1 November 1987, Izumi and neighbouring Takaono designated a wildlife protection area of 842ha, 54ha of which is a specially protected.

However, one problem that has arisen is that the cranes have begun to congregate only in Izumi, leading to research into how to get the cranes to winter in other parts of western Japan.

== See also ==
Japanese crane, for another crane species that lives in Hokkaidō, Japan.
