= Kami Sendai Station =

Railway station in Satsumasendai, Kagoshima Prefecture, Japan

Kami Sendai Station: 上川内駅; かみせんだい
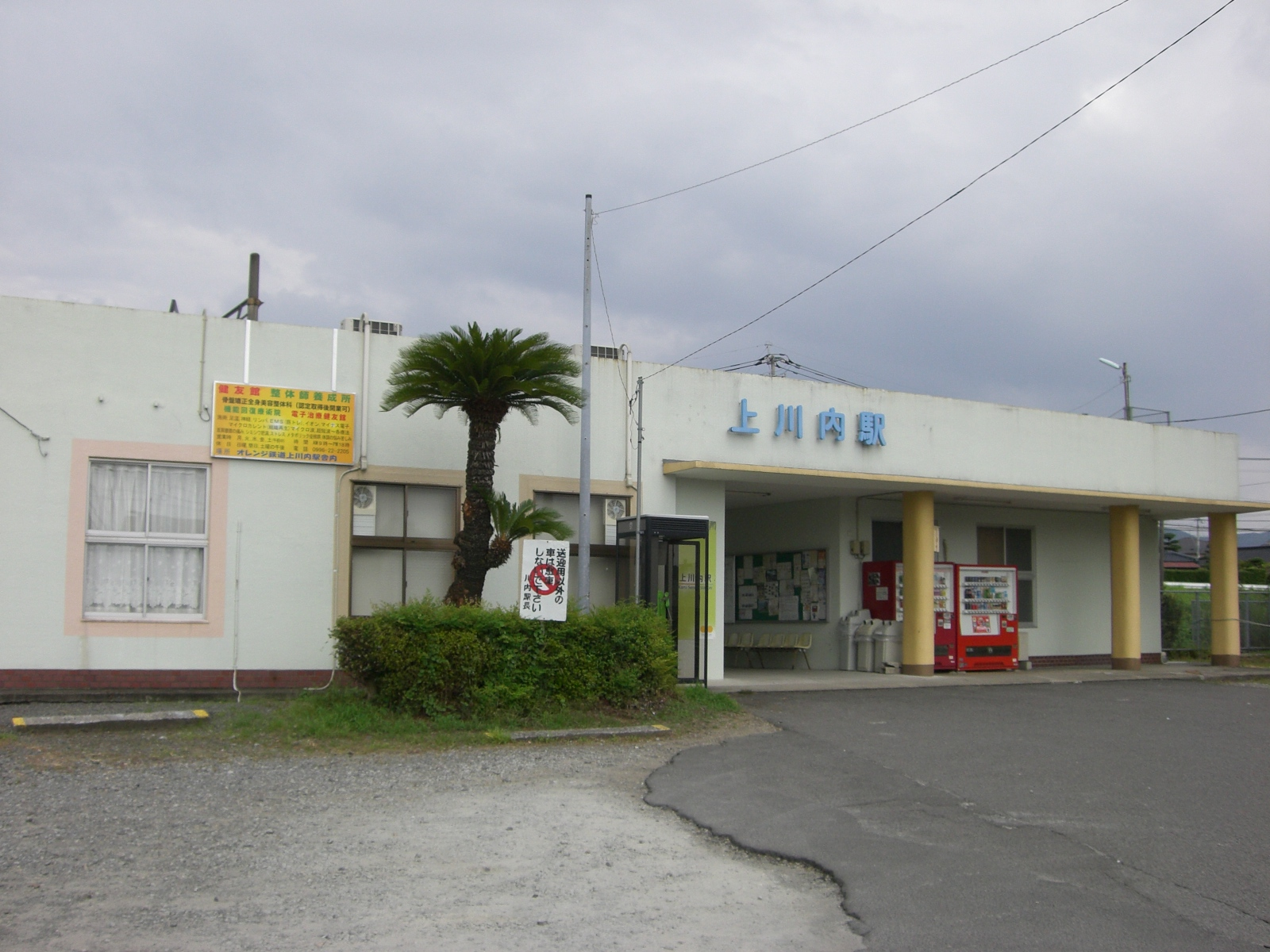
- Kami Sendai Station in 2007

General information
- Location: 28 Goryōshitachō, Satsumasendai-shi, Kagoshima-ken 895-0061; Japan
- Coordinates: 31°50′7.33″N 130°17′32.66″E
- Operator: Hisatsu Orange Railway Co., Ltd.
- Line: ■ Hisatsu Orange Railway Line
- Distance: 113.7 km from Yatsushiro; 6.4 km from Kusamichi
- Platforms: 2 side platforms
- Tracks: 2

Construction
- Structure type: At-grade

Other information
- Station code: OR27
- Website: Official website (in Japanese)

History
- Opened: 1 July 1922
- Original company: Japanese Government Railways

Passengers
- FY2019: 219
Location
- Location within Kagoshima Prefecture Location within Japan

Kami Sendai Station (上川内駅, Kami Sendai-eki) is a passenger railway station located in the city of Satsumasendai, Kagoshima Prefecture, Japan. It is operated by third-sector railway company Hisatsu Orange Railway.

== Lines ==
The station is served by the Hisatsu Orange Railway Line that follows the former coastal route of the JR Kyushu Kagoshima Main Line connecting Yatsushiro and Sendai. It is located 113.7 km from the starting point of the line at Yatsushiro.

== Station layout ==
The station is an above-ground station with two side platforms and two tracks. It has a reinforced concrete station building built in 1952, and when it was a staffed station, it had a stationmaster's office, a railway parcel window, and a ticket counter, but is now unattended.

=== Platforms ===
1	■ ■ Hisatsu Orange Railway	for Sendai
2	■ ■Hisatsu Orange Railway	for Izumi, Minamata, and Yatsushiro

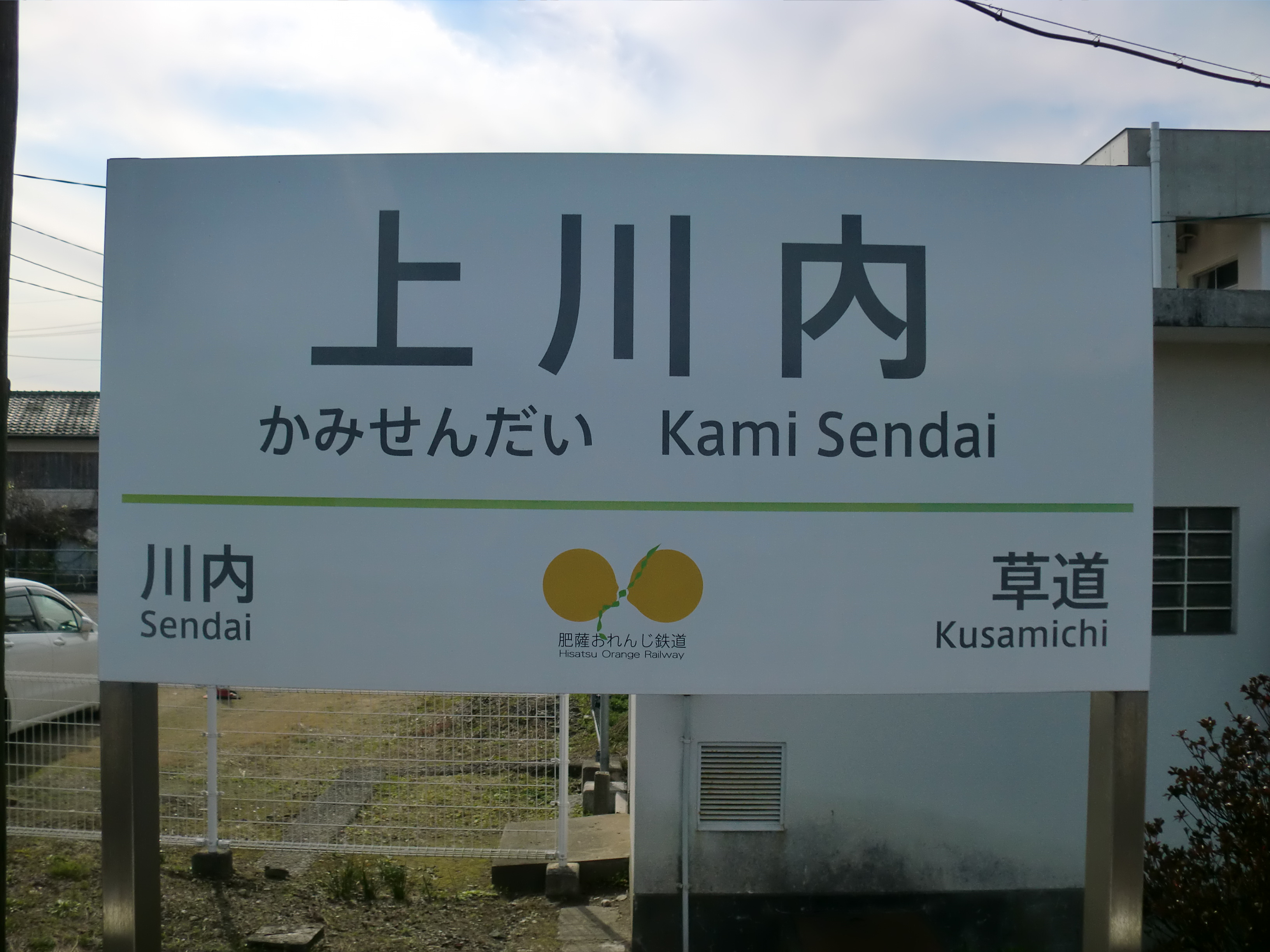
Station sign

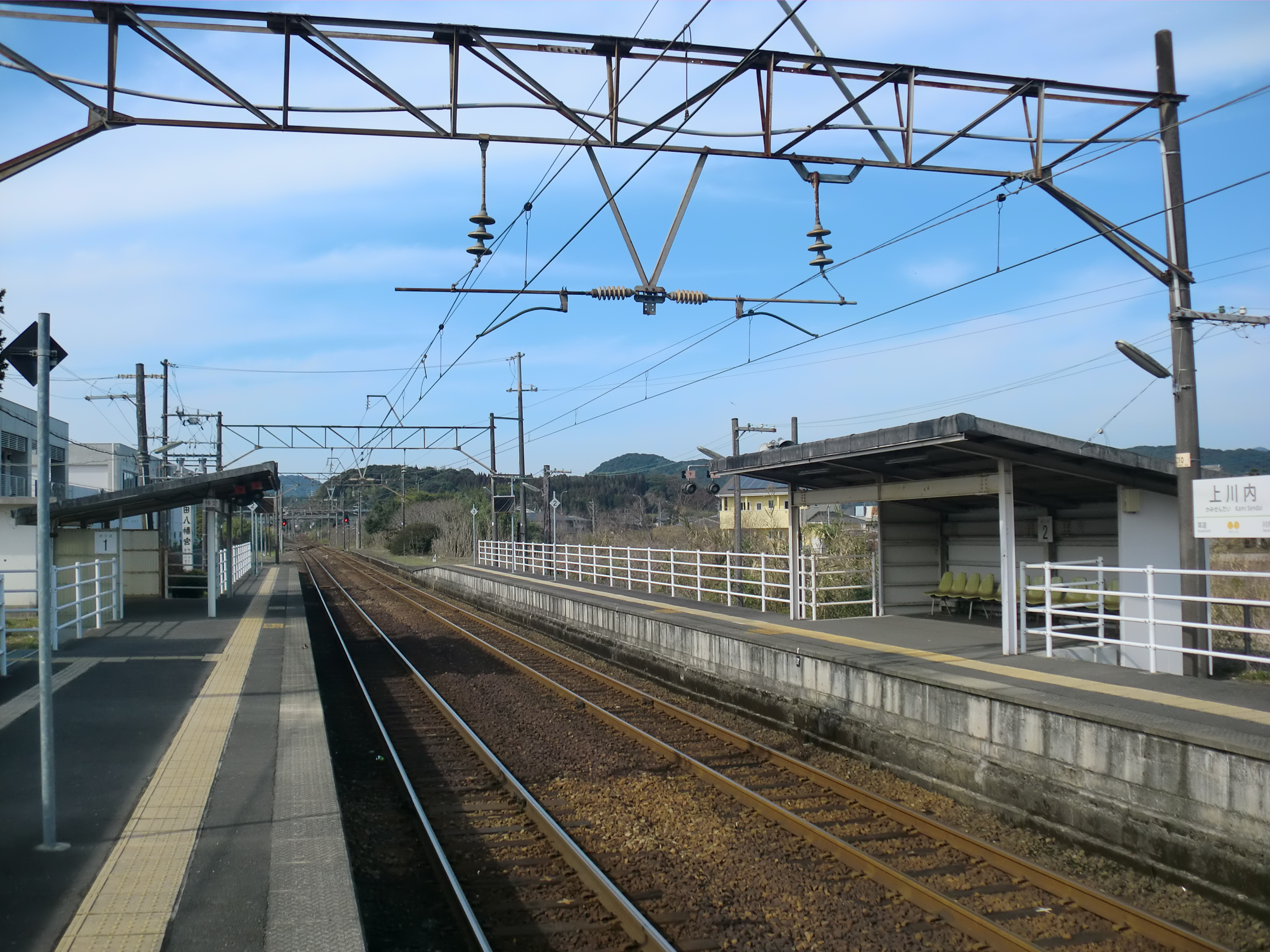
View of platforms and shelter

== Adjacent stations ==
«	Service	»
Hisatsu Orange Railway Line
Kusamichi	–	Sendai
Rapid Express Super Orange: Does not stop at this station

== History ==
Kami Sendai Station was opened on 1 July 1922 as a station on the Japanese Government Railways Sendai Line, which was incorporated into the Kagoshima Main Line on 17 October 1927. With the privatization of the Japan National Railways on 1 April 1987, the station was transferred to JR Kyushu. On 13 March 2004, with the opening of the Kyushu Shinkansen, the station was transferred to the Hisatsu Orange Railway.

== Passenger statistics ==
The average daily passenger traffic in fiscal 2019 was 219 people.

== Surrounding area ==
- Kagoshima Prefectural Sendai High School
- Japan National Route 3

== See also ==
- List of railway stations in Japan
