= Kusamichi Station =

Railway station in Satsumasendai, Kagoshima Prefecture, Japan

Kusamichi Station: 草道駅; くさみち
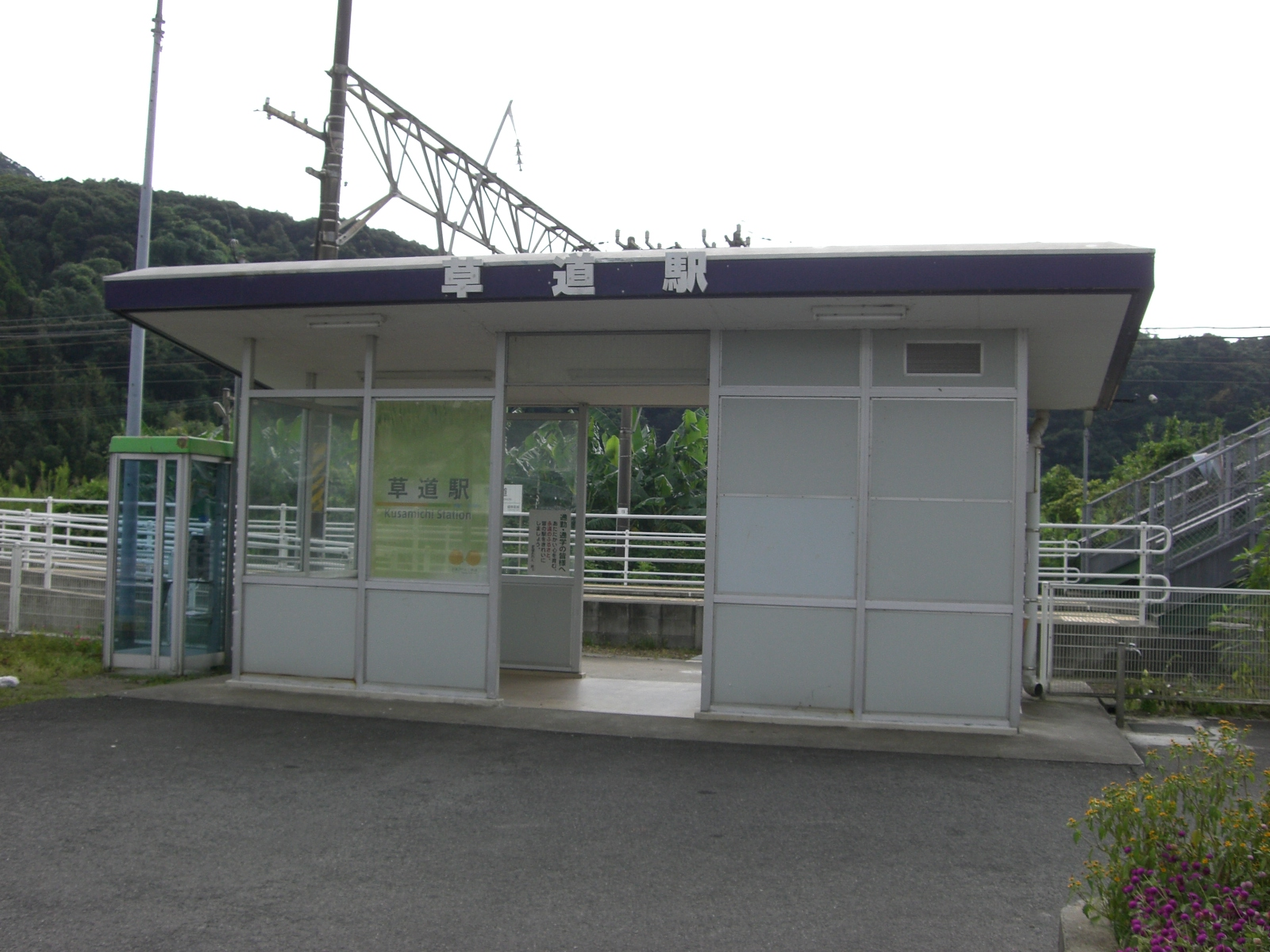
- Kusamichi Station station building in 2007

General information
- Location: Mizuhikicho, Satsumasendai-shi, Kagoshima-ken 899-1921; Japan
- Coordinates: 31.85441°N 130.23353°E
- Operator: Hisatsu Orange Railway Co., Ltd.
- Line: ■ Hisatsu Orange Railway Line
- Distance: 107.3 km from Yatsushiro; 5.0 km from Satsuma Taki
- Platforms: 2 side platforms
- Tracks: 2

Construction
- Structure type: At-grade

Other information
- Station code: OR26
- Website: Official website (in Japanese)

History
- Opened: 1 July 1922
- Original company: Japanese Government Railways

Passengers
- FY2019: 49
Location
- Location within Kagoshima Prefecture Location within Japan

Kusamichi Station (草道駅, Kusamichi-eki) is a passenger railway station located in the city of Satsumasendai, Kagoshima Prefecture, Japan. It is operated by third-sector railway company Hisatsu Orange Railway.

== Lines ==
The station is served by the Hisatsu Orange Railway Line that follows the former coastal route of the JR Kyushu Kagoshima Main Line connecting Yatsushiro and Sendai. It is located 107.3 km from the starting point of the line at Yatsushiro.

== Station layout ==
The station consists of two side platforms at street level. There is no station building, but only a small waiting shelter and the station is unattended.

=== Platforms ===
1	■ ■ Hisatsu Orange Railway	for Sendai
2	■ ■Hisatsu Orange Railway	for Izumi, Minamata, and Yatsushiro

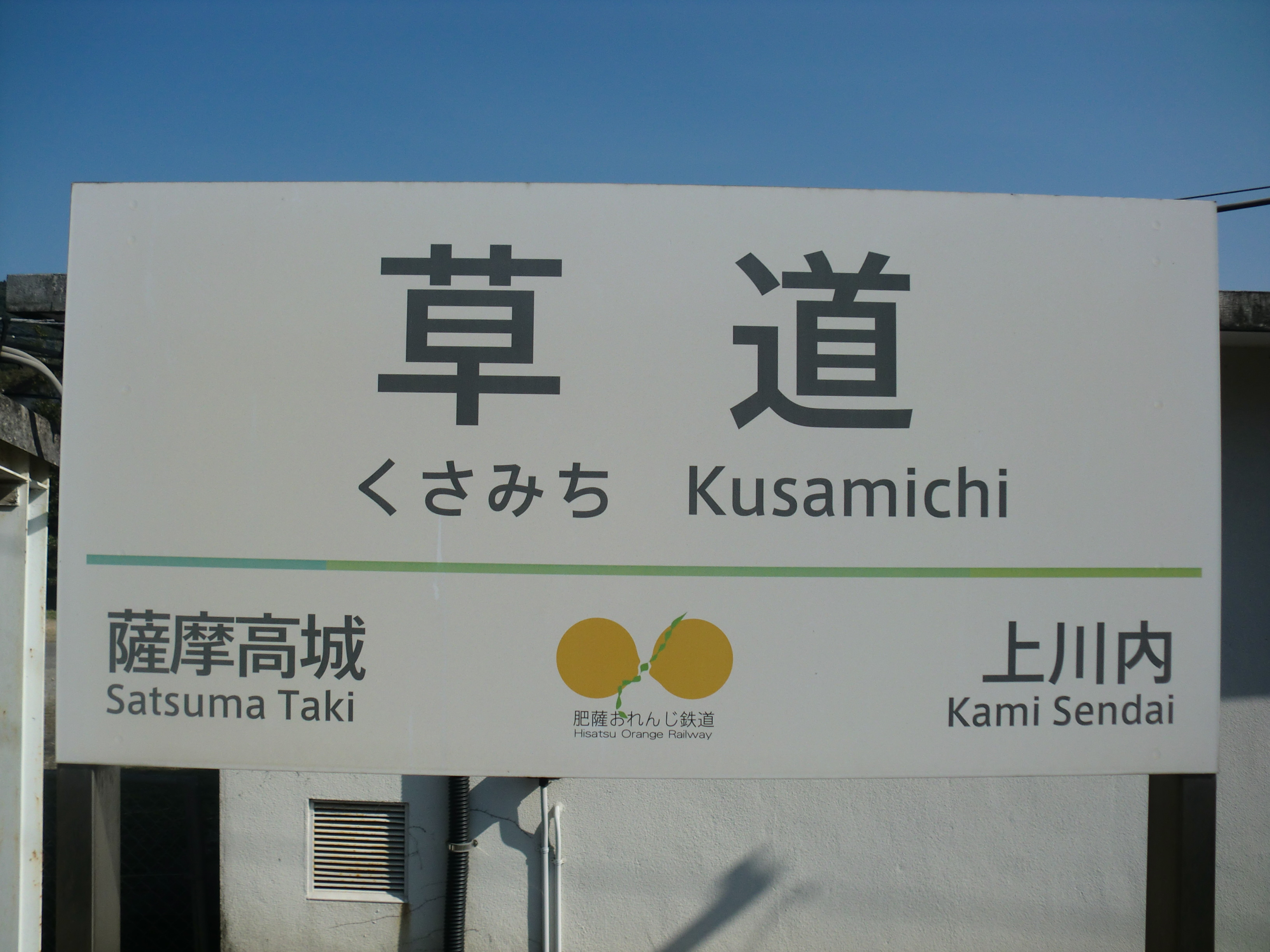
Station sign

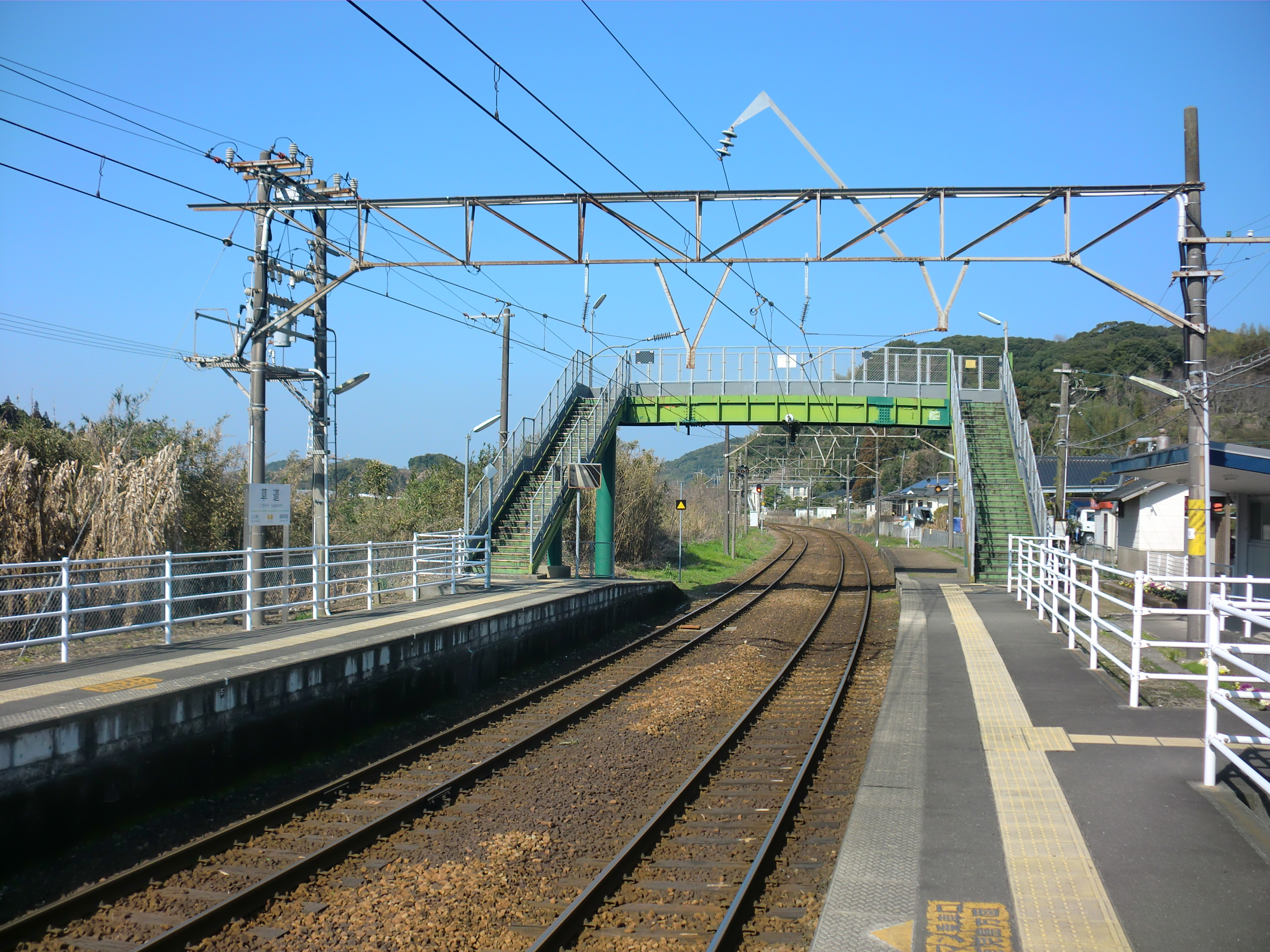
View of platforms

== Adjacent stations ==
«	Service	»
Hisatsu Orange Railway Line
Satsuma Taki	–	Kami Sendai
Rapid Express Ocean Liner Satsuma: Does not stop at this station

== History ==
Nishikata Station was opened on 1 July 1922 as a station on the Japanese Government Railways Sendai Line, which was incorporated into the Kagoshima Main Line on 17 October 1927. With the privatization of the Japan National Railways on 1 April 1987, the station was transferred to JR Kyushu. On 13 March 2004, with the opening of the Kyushu Shinkansen, the station was transferred to the Hisatsu Orange Railway.

== Passenger statistics ==
The average daily passenger traffic in fiscal 2019 was 49 people.

== Surrounding area ==
- Japan National Route 3
- Satsumasendai City Mizuhiki Elementary School
- Satsumasendai City Mizuhiki Junior High School

== See also ==
- List of railway stations in Japan
