= Nishikata Station =

Railway station in Satsumasendai, Kagoshima Prefecture, Japan

Nishikata Station: 西方駅; にしかた
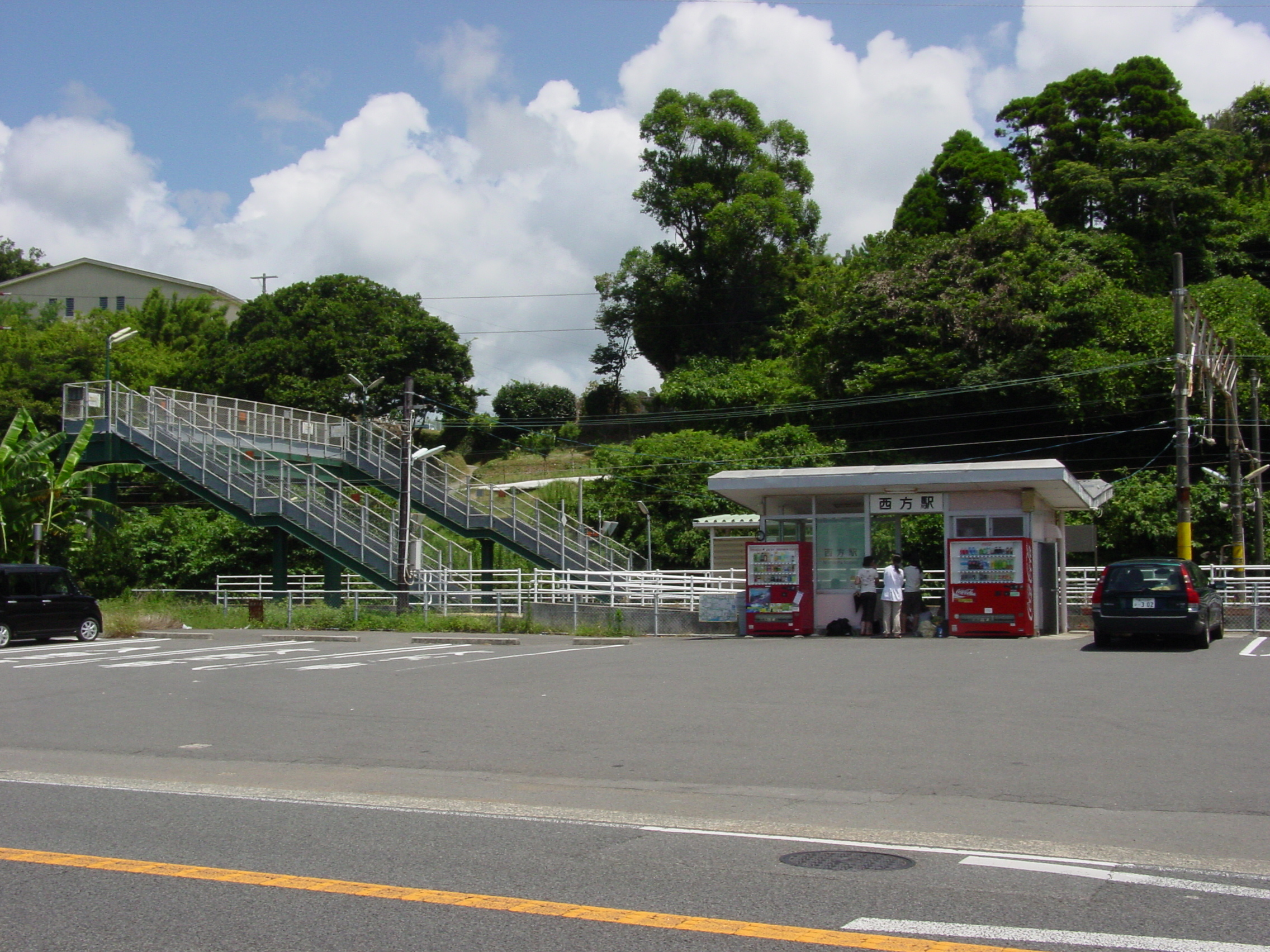
- Nishikata station building and footbridge in 2008

General information
- Location: Nishikatacho, Satsumasendai-shi, Kagoshima-ken 899-1801; Japan
- Coordinates: 31.9164°N 130.22375°E
- Operator: Hisatsu Orange Railway Co., Ltd.
- Line: ■ Hisatsu Orange Railway Line
- Distance: 99.6 km from Yatsushiro; 3.9 km from Satsuma Ohkawa
- Platforms: 2 side platforms
- Tracks: 1

Construction
- Structure type: At-grade

Other information
- Station code: OR24
- Website: Official website (in Japanese)

History
- Opened: 1 July 1922
- Original company: Japanese Government Railways

Passengers
- FY2019: 23
Location
- Location within Kagoshima Prefecture Location within Japan

Nishikata Station (西方駅, Nishikata-eki) is a passenger railway station located in the city of Satsumasendai, Kagoshima Prefecture, Japan. It is operated by third-sector railway company Hisatsu Orange Railway.

== Lines ==
The station is served by the Hisatsu Orange Railway Line that follows the former coastal route of the JR Kyushu Kagoshima Main Line connecting Yatsushiro and Sendai. It is located 99.6 km from the starting point of the line at Yatsushiro.

== Station layout ==
The station consists of two side platforms and two tracks. It is unattended station. A maintenance siding is provided on the upper side. During the former JNR era, it was a staffed station with two platforms and three tracks, with a large white concrete station building, a freight siding and freight platform, and JNR official housing on both sides of the station building. During its peak in the 1970s, it was very busy, especially during summer vacation and long weekends, with beachgoers at the nearby Nishikata Beach, tourists at Kawauchi Takagi Onsen. Express trains made special stops, and several special trains were scheduled to stop at the station from the direction of Nishi-Kagoshima Station. In 1983, the station was unattended and the government housing was removed, reducing the size of the station premises. In 1988, the station building was demolished and a simple waiting room was installed. Around 2000, the center track was discontinued, leaving the station with two tracks and two platforms, which is the case today. After the center track was discontinued, the signals, overhead wires, and the points rail that crossed the main line were removed, and it was left abandoned for many years, but when it was transferred to the Hisatsu Orange Railway in March 2004, the tracks were completely removed.

=== Platforms ===
| 1 | ■ ■ Hisatsu Orange Railway | for Izumi, Minamata, and Yatsushiro |
| 2 | ■ ■Hisatsu Orange Railway | for Sendai |

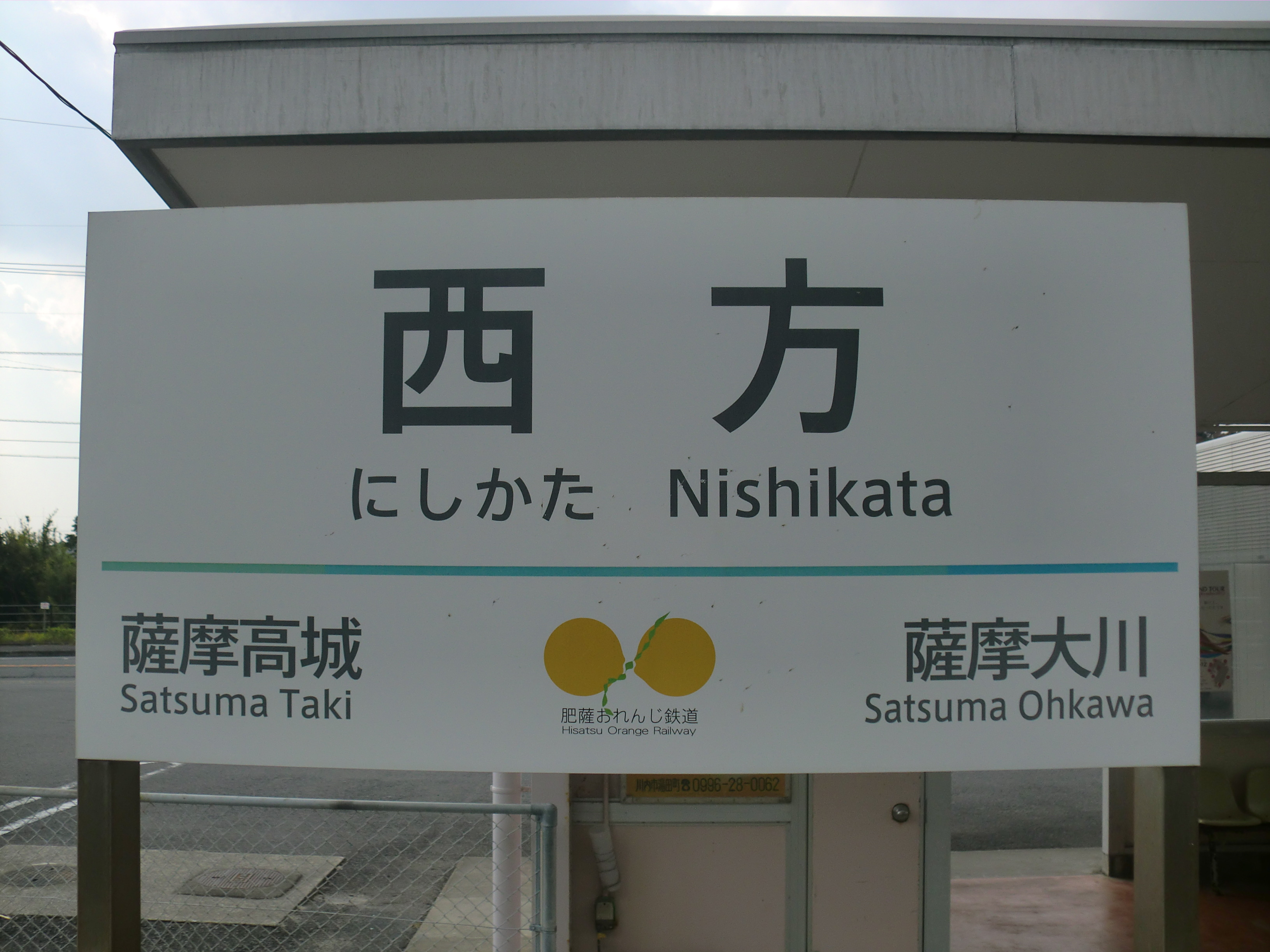
Station sign

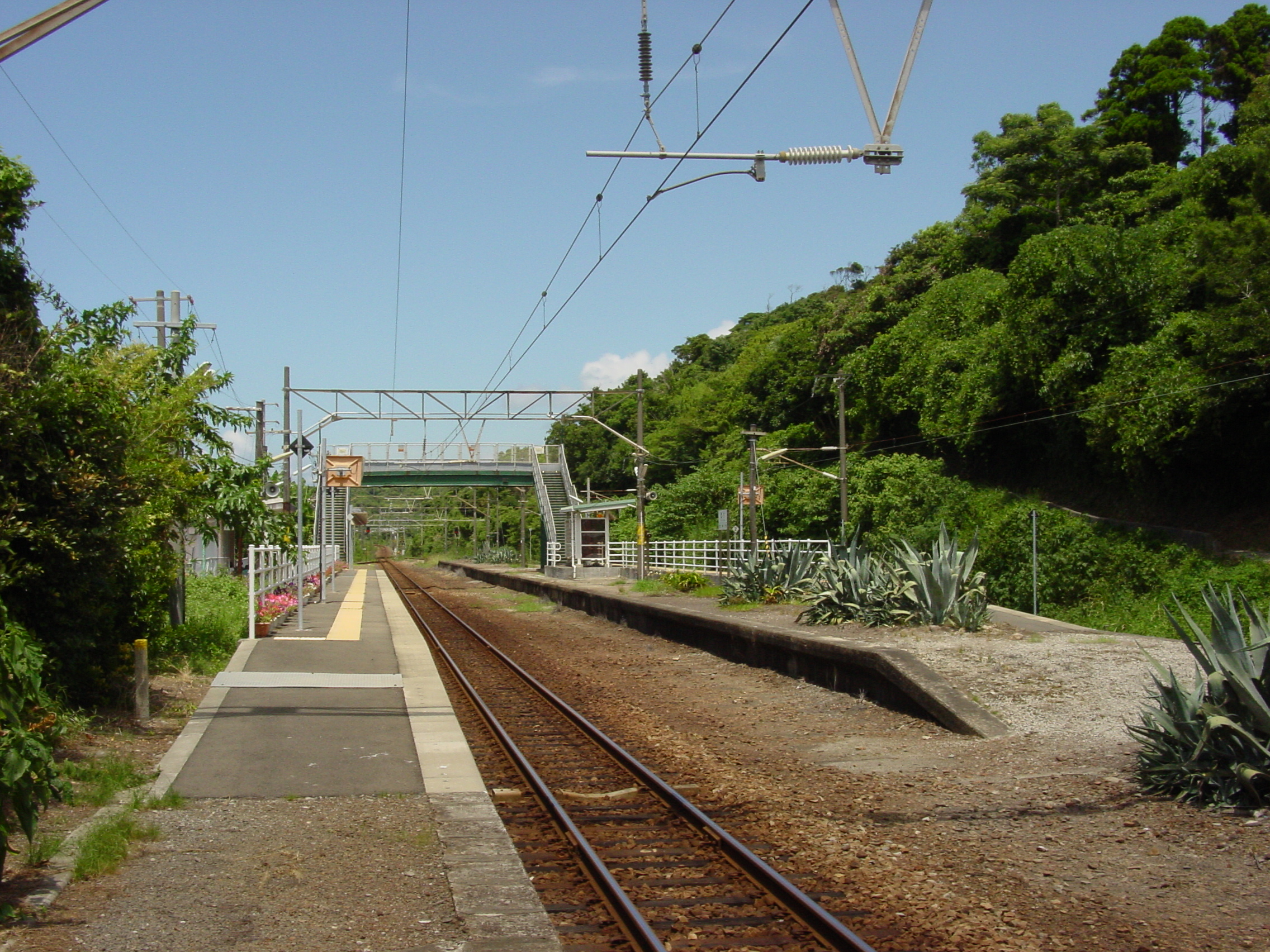
View of operating platform

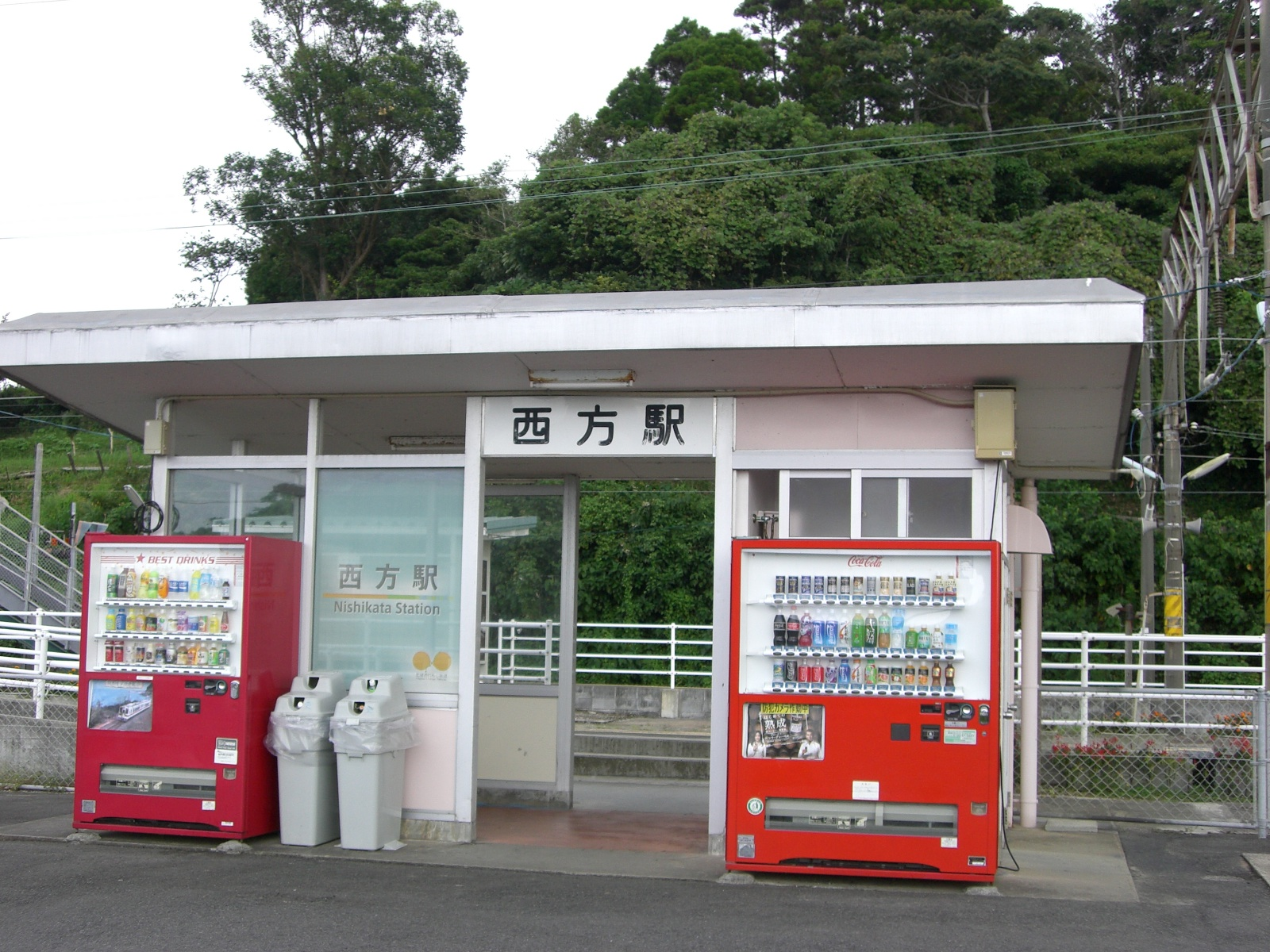
Closer view of station with vending machines

== Adjacent stations ==
| « | Service | » |
Hisatsu Orange Railway Line
| Satsuma Ohkawa | – | Satsuma Taki |
Rapid Express Ocean Liner Satsuma: Does not stop at this station

== History ==
Nishikata Station was opened on 1 July 1922 as a station on the Japanese Government Railways Sendai Line, which was incorporated into the Kagoshima Main Line on 17 October 1927. With the privatization of the Japan National Railways on 1 April 1987, the station was transferred to JR Kyushu. On 13 March 2004, with the opening of the Kyushu Shinkansen, the station was transferred to the Hisatsu Orange Railway.

== Passenger statistics ==
The average daily passenger traffic in fiscal 2019 was 23 people.

== Surrounding area ==
- Nishikata Beach
- Japan National Route 3

== See also ==
- List of railway stations in Japan
