= Kagoshima Immaculate Heart University =

Coordinates: 31.8257°N 130.3290°E

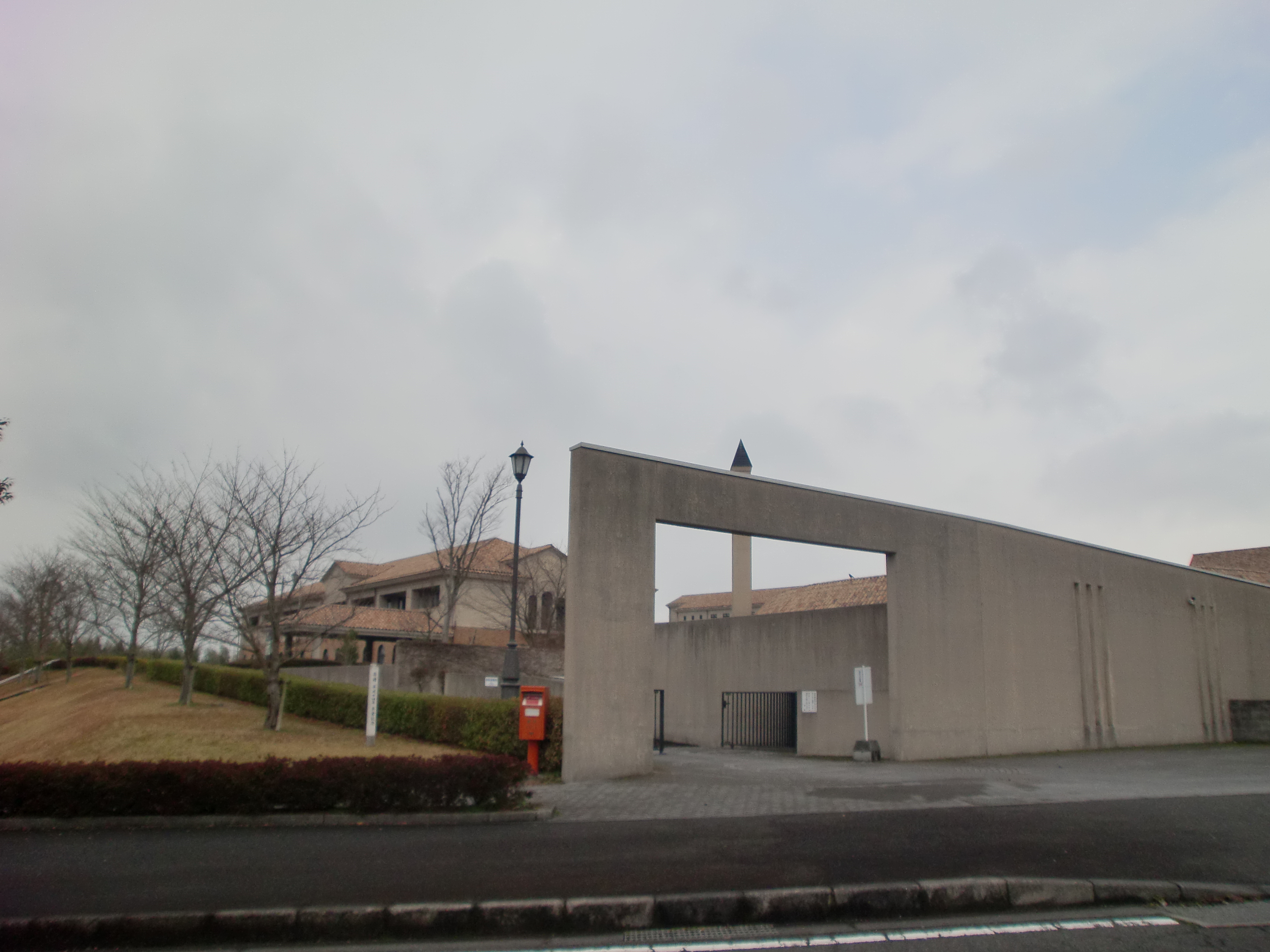
Kagoshima Immaculate Heart University

Kagoshima Immaculate Heart University (鹿児島純心女子大学, Kagoshima junshin joshi daigaku) is a private women's university in Satsumasendai, Kagoshima, Japan. The predecessor of the school was founded in 1933, and it was chartered as a junior university in 1961. In 1994, it became a four-year college and adopted the present name.
