= Noda, Kagoshima =

Dissolved municipality in Kagoshima prefecture, Japan

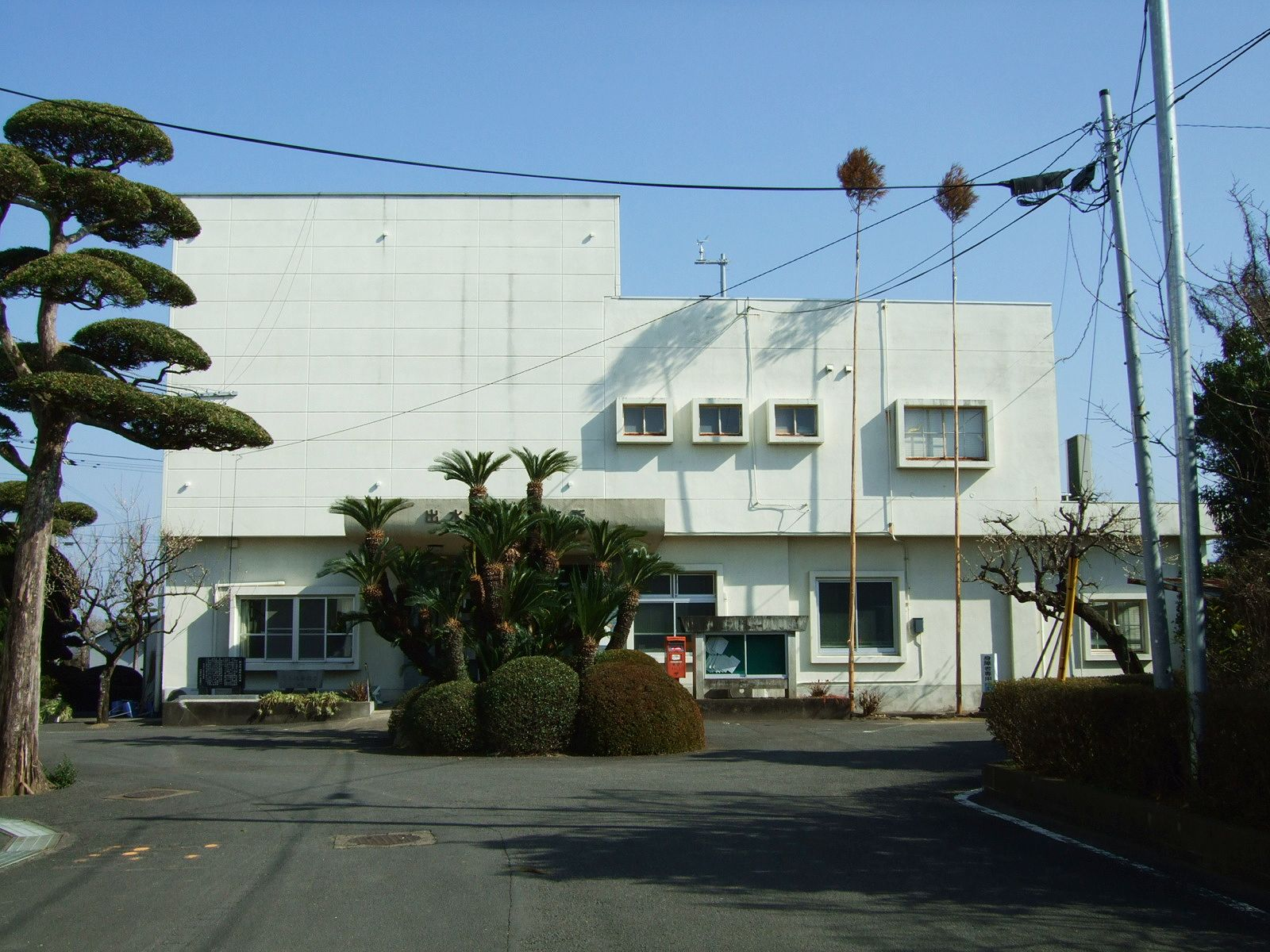
Former Noda town office.

Noda (野田町, Noda-chō) was a town located in Izumi District, Kagoshima Prefecture, Japan.

As of 2003, the town had an estimated population of 4,913 and a density of 160.56 persons per km^{2}. The total area was 30.60 km^{2}.

On March 13, 2006, Noda, along with the town of Takaono (also from Izumi District), was merged into the expanded city of Izumi and no longer exists as an independent municipality.
