= Satsuma Taki Station =

Railway station in Satsumasendai, Kagoshima Prefecture, Japan

Satsuma Taki Station: 薩摩高城駅; さつまたき
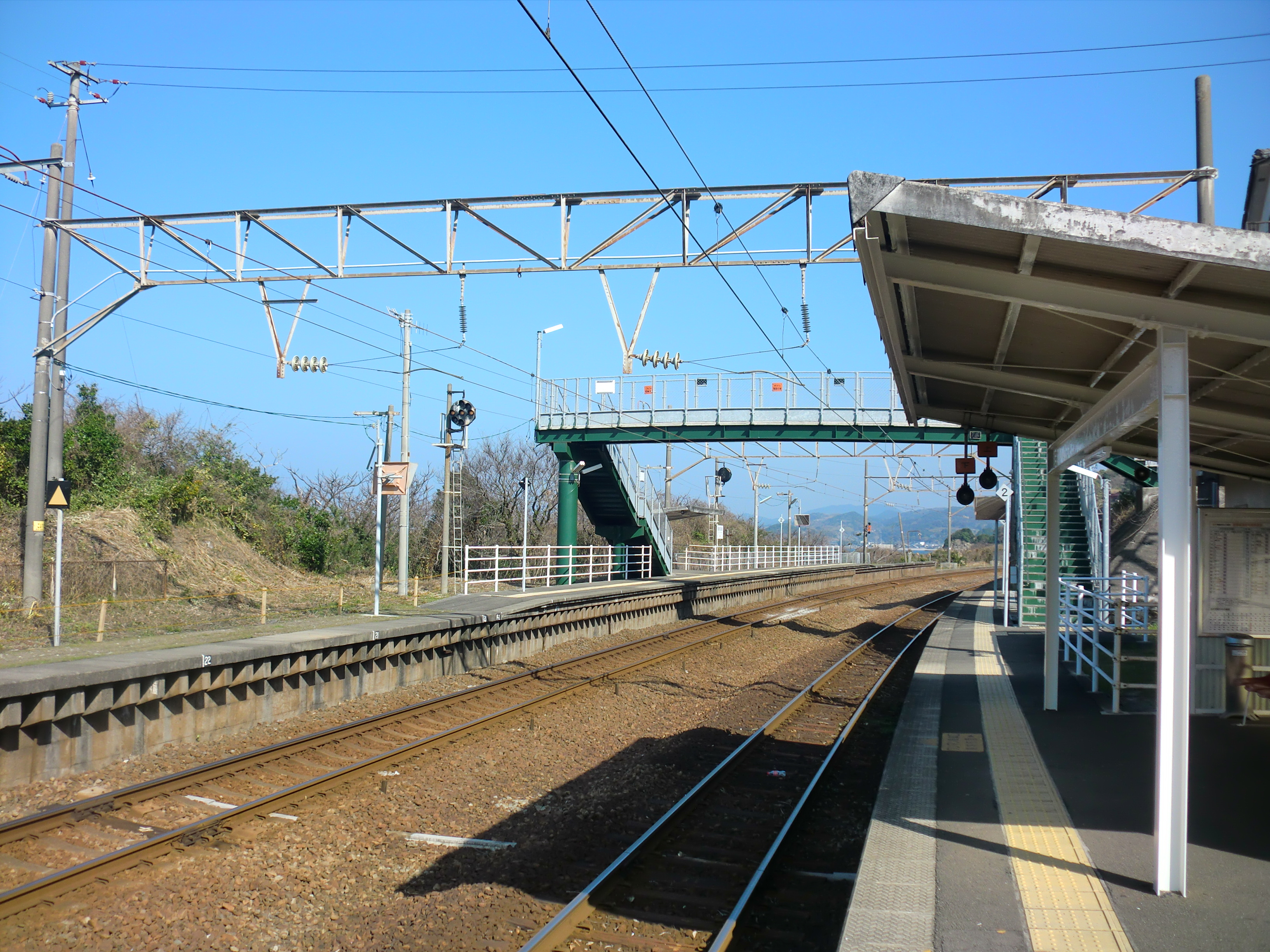
- Station platforms in 2013

General information
- Location: Yudacho, Satsumasendai-shi, Kagoshima-ken 899-1802; Japan
- Coordinates: 31.89254°N 130.22056°E
- Operator: Hisatsu Orange Railway Co., Ltd.
- Line: ■ Hisatsu Orange Railway Line
- Distance: 102.3 km from Yatsushiro; 2.7 km from Nishikata
- Platforms: 2 side platforms
- Tracks: 2

Construction
- Structure type: At-grade

Other information
- Station code: OR25
- Website: Official website (in Japanese)

History
- Opened: 1 May 1952
- Original company: Japanese National Railways

Passengers
- FY2019: 5
Location
- Location within Kagoshima Prefecture Location within Japan

Satsuma Taki Station (薩摩高城駅, Satsuma Taki-eki) is a passenger railway station located in the city of Satsumasendai, Kagoshima Prefecture, Japan. It is served by the It is operated by third-sector railway company Hisatsu Orange Railway.

== Station layout ==
The station consists of two side platforms at street level connected by a footbridge. There is no station building and the station is unattended. Because this station is located on a large curve, a large inclination (cant) was installed on the main line (platform 2) side of the track so that express trains could pass at high speed. Trains that stop at platform 2 tilt significantly when they stop at the station and therefore most trains in either direction use Platform 1.

=== Platforms ===
| 1 | ■ ■ Hisatsu Orange Railway | for Izumi, Minamata, and Yatsushiro |
| 2 | ■ ■Hisatsu Orange Railway | for Sendai |

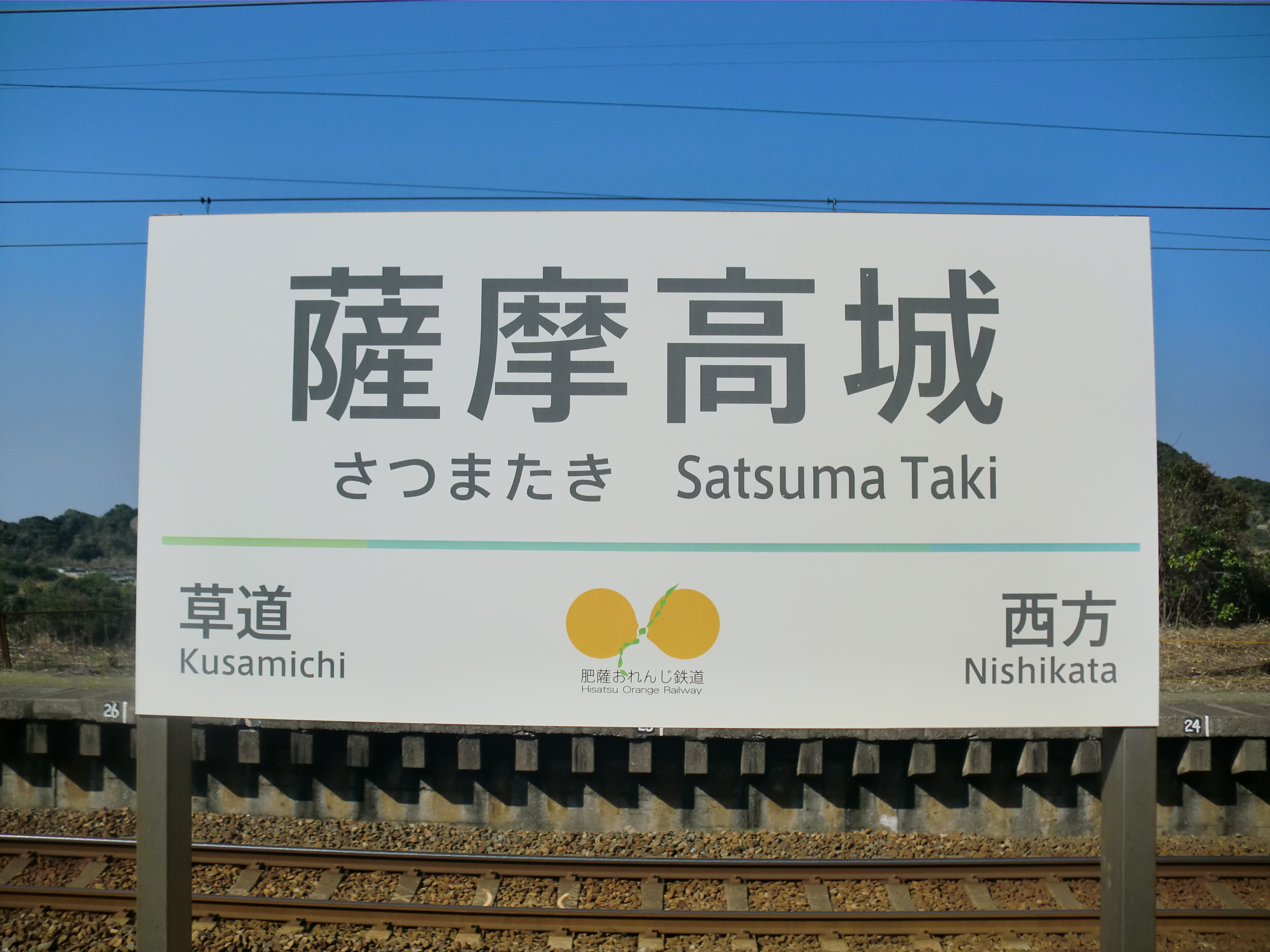
Station sign

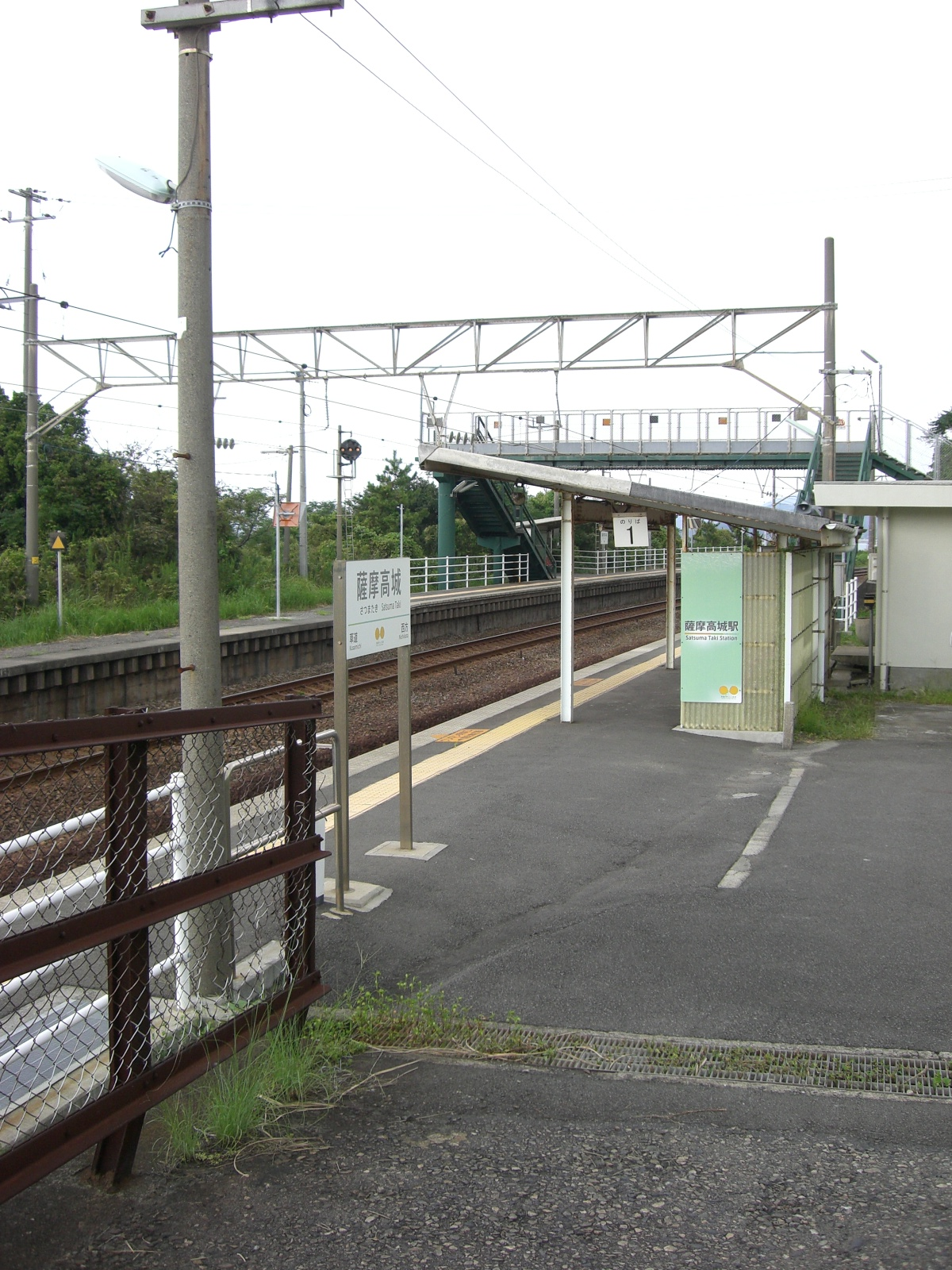
Pedestrian access

== Adjacent stations ==
| « | Service | » |
Hisatsu Orange Railway Line
| Nishikata | – | Kusamichi |
Rapid Express Ocean Liner Satsuma: Does not stop at this station

== History ==
Satsuma Taki Station was opened on 1 May 1952. With the privatization of the Japan National Railways on 1 April 1987, the station was transferred to JR Kyushu. On 13 March 2004, with the opening of the Kyushu Shinkansen, the station was transferred to the Hisatsu Orange Railway.

== Passenger statistics ==
The average daily passenger traffic in fiscal 2019 was 23 people.

== Surrounding area ==
- Japan National Route 3

== See also ==
- List of railway stations in Japan
