= Izumi, Kagoshima =

Izumi 出水市
- City
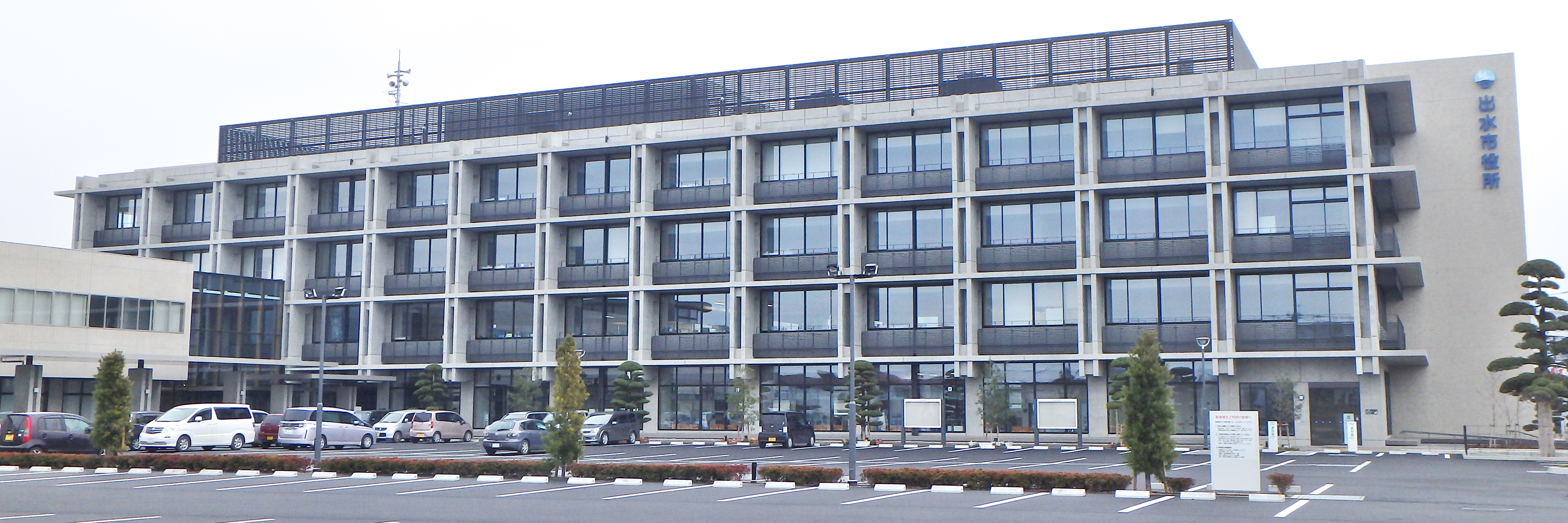
- Izumi City Hall

- Flag Emblem
- Interactive map of Izumi
- Location in Japan
- Coordinates: 32°5′26″N 130°21′10″E
- Country: Japan
- Region: Kyushu
- Prefecture: Kagoshima

Government
  - Mayor: Shinichi Shiinoki (from April 2018)

Area
  - Total: 329.98 km^{2} (127.41 sq mi)

Population (July 1, 2024)
  - Total: 51,450
  - Density: 155.9/km^{2} (403.8/sq mi)
- Time zone: UTC+09:00 (JST)
- City hall address: 1-3 Midorimachi, Izumi-shi, Kagoshima-ken 899-0292
- Website: Official website
- Symbols
- Flower: Azalea
- Tree: Inumaki

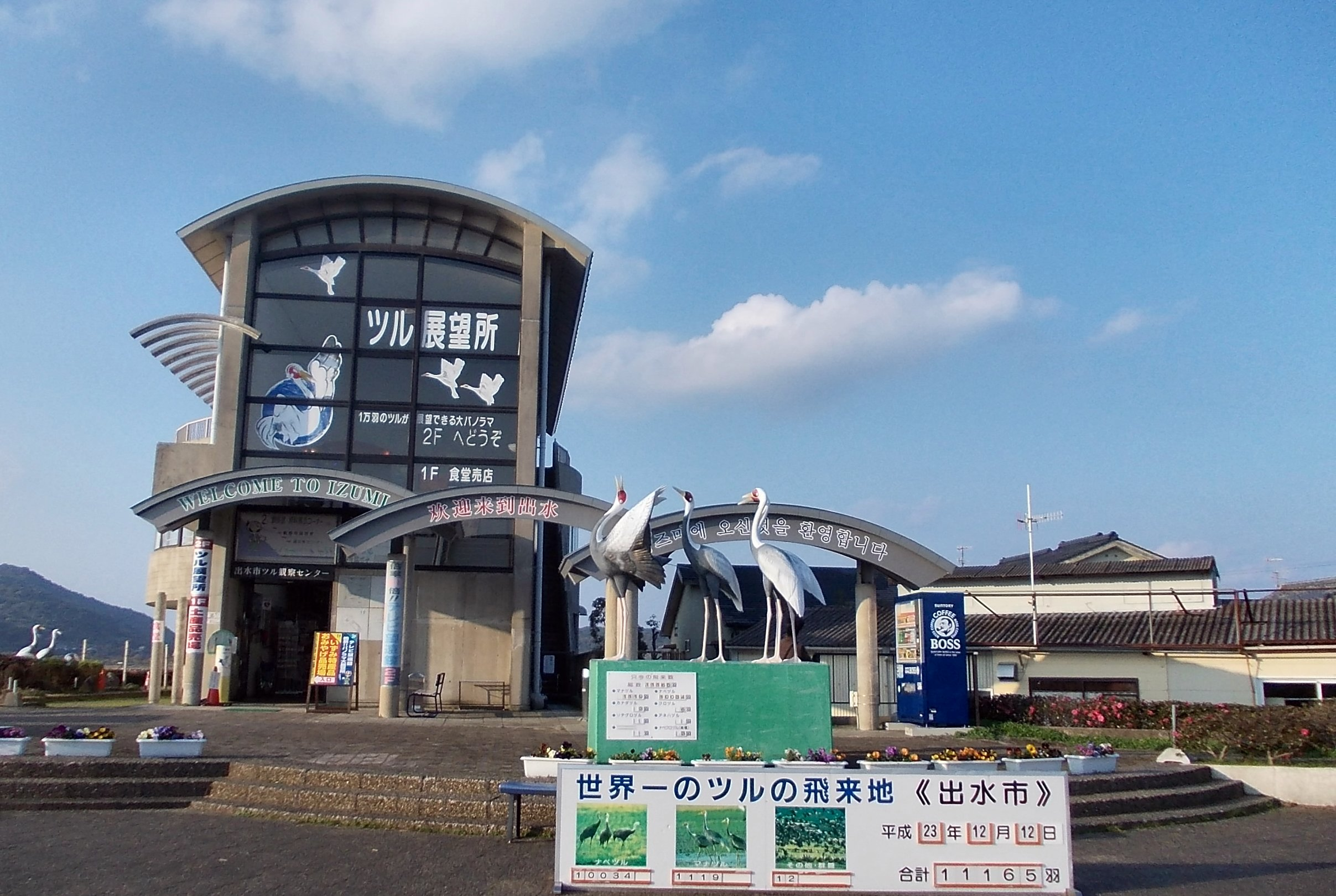
Izumi Crane Migration Ground Building

Izumi (出水市, Izumi-shi; Japanese pronunciation: [í.(d͡)zɨ̀.mʲì, ì.(d͡)zɨ́.mʲí.ɕì)]) is a city located in Kagoshima Prefecture, Japan. As of 1 July 2024, the city had an estimated population of 51,450 in 25838 households, and a population density of 160 persons per km^{2}. The total area of the city is 329.98 km^{2} (127.41 sq mi).

== Geography ==
Izumi is located in the northwest of Kagoshima Prefecture, about 80km north-northwest of Kagoshima City. The northern part of the city faces the Yatsushiro Sea (Shiranui Sea), the Hisatsu Mountains run northeast in the east with Yahazudake as its main peak, and the southern part is bordered by a mountain range stretching east-west with Mt. Shibi at its center. Most of the city is an alluvial fan, and the Yonenotsu River and its tributaries, the Hirara River, Takaono River, and Noda River, each flow northwest and empty into the Yatsushiro Sea. Izumi as indicated by the kanji of its name, is the point at which the Komenotsu River flows into the sea.

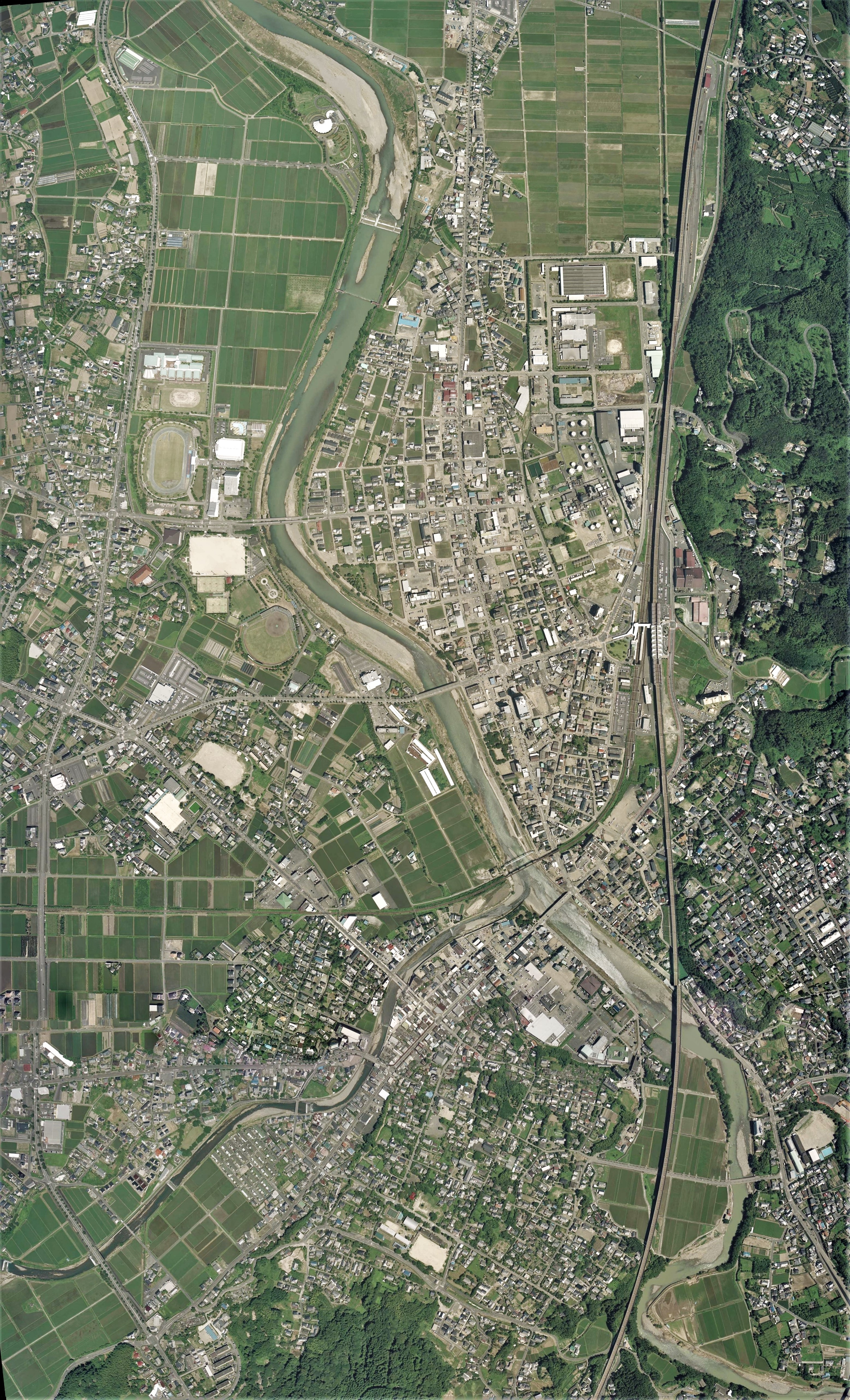
Aerial photograph of the Izumi city centre taken in 2006

=== Neighboring municipalities ===
Kagoshima Prefecture

- Akune
- Isa
- Satsuma
- Satsumasendai

Kumamoto Prefecture

- Minamata

=== Climate ===
Izumi has a humid subtropical climate (Köppen Cfa) characterized by warm summers and cool winters with light to no snowfall. The average annual temperature in Izumi is 16.6 °C. The average annual rainfall is 2284 mm with September as the wettest month. The temperatures are highest on average in August, at around 26.4 °C, and lowest in January, at around 4.0 °C.

=== Demographics ===
Per Japanese census data, the population of Izumi is as shown below:

Historical population
Year	Pop.	±%
1950	71,893	—
1960	67,483	−6.1%
1970	56,289	−16.6%
1980	57,279	+1.8%
1990	57,962	+1.2%
2000	58,460	+0.9%
2010	55,621	−4.9%
2020	51,994	−6.5%

== History ==
Izumi is part of ancient Satsuma Province, and is mentioned in the early Heian period Wamyō Ruijushō. It was part of Satsuma Domain in the Edo Period. The villages of Kami-Izumi, Naka-Izumi, Shimo-Izumi, Takaono and Noda were established on April 1, 1889 with the creation of the modern municipalities system. Kami-Izumi was raised to town status on January 1, 1925 and was renamed "Izumi". Naka-Izumi was raised to town status on July 1, 1923 and renamed Yonenotsu. Izumi merged with Yonenotsu April 1, 1954. and became the city of Izumi. On March 13, 2006, the towns of Noda and Takaono (both from Izumi District) were merged into Izumi.

== Government ==
Izumi has a mayor-council form of government with a directly elected mayor and a unicameral city council of 20 members. Izumi contributes two members to the Kagoshima Prefectural Assembly. In terms of national politics, the city is part of the Kagoshima 3rd district of the lower house of the Diet of Japan.

== Economy ==
The main economy activity of Izumi is agriculture and commerce. Notable local products include mandarin oranges, Fava beans, snap peas, tobacco and buckwheat.

== Education ==
Izumi has 13 public elementary schools, six public junior high schools and one public high school by the city government, and three public high schools operated by the Kagoshima Prefectural Board of Education. There is also one private high school (Izumi Chuo High School). The prefecture also operates a special education school for the handicapped.

== Transportation ==
=== Railways ===
JR Kyushu - Kyushu Shinkansen

Izumi

Hisatsu Orange Railway

- Komenotsu - Izumi - Nishi-Izumi - Takaono - Nodagou

=== Highways ===
- Minamikyushu Expressway
- National Route 3
- National Route 389
- National Route 447
- National Route 504

== Sister cities ==
- Suncheon, Jeonnam-Gwangju, Korea, since 2012
- Puli, Nantou, Taiwan, friendship city since 2017

== Local attractions ==
- Izumi crane migration grounds

== Noted people from Izumi ==
- Mao Ichiyama, track and field athlete
- Keisuke Osako, football player
- Nanami Sakuraba, gravure idol and actress
- Kirara Shiraishi, track and field athlete
- Hiroyuki Sakai, Iron Chef French
