= Satsuma, Kagoshima =

Satsuma さつま町
- Town
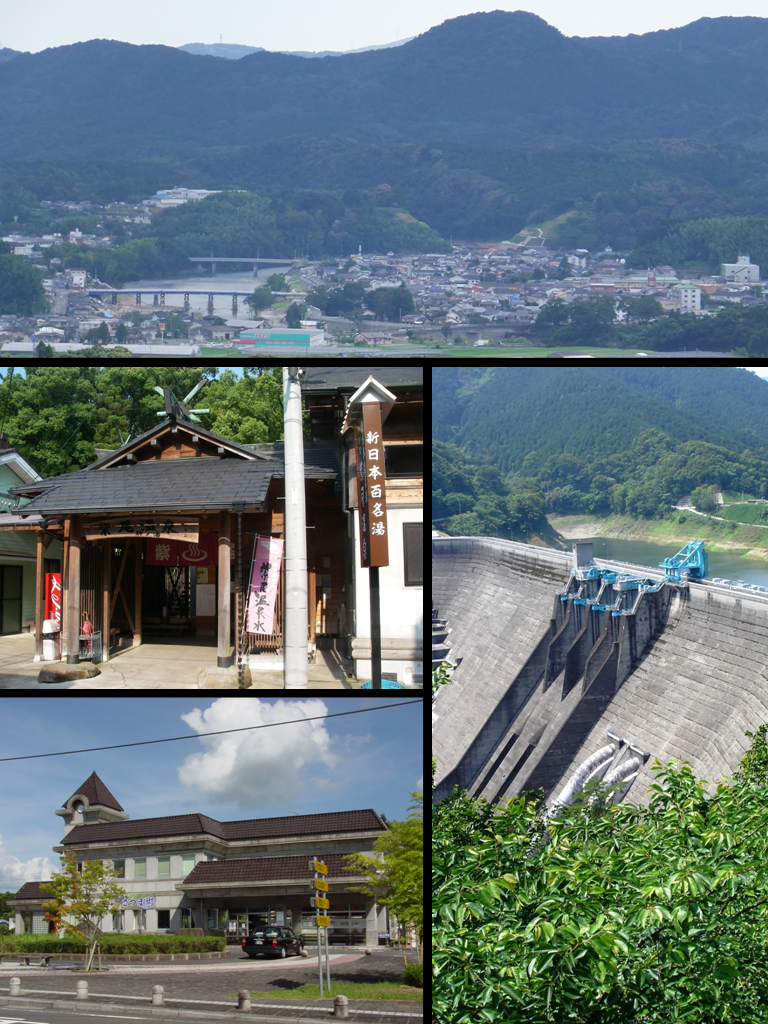
- Clockwise from top: View of Central Satsuma Town from Tsuruta area, Tsuruta Dam, Miyanojyo Railroad Museum, Shibi Public Spa

- Flag Chapter
- Location of Satsuma in Kagoshima Prefecture

- Location in Japan
- Coordinates: 31°54′20″N 130°27′20″E
- Country: Japan
- Region: Kyushu
- Prefecture: Kagoshima
- District: Satsuma

Area
  - Total: 303.90 km^{2} (117.34 sq mi)

Population (July 1, 2024)
  - Total: 18,399
  - Density: 60.543/km^{2} (156.81/sq mi)
- Time zone: UTC+09:00 (JST)
- City hall address: 1565-2 Miyanoshiro Yachi, Satsuma-cho, Satsuma-gun, Kagoshima-ken 895-1803
- Climate: Cfa
- Website: Official website
- Symbols
- Bird: Mandarin duck
- Flower: Orchid
- Insect: firefly
- Tree: Maple

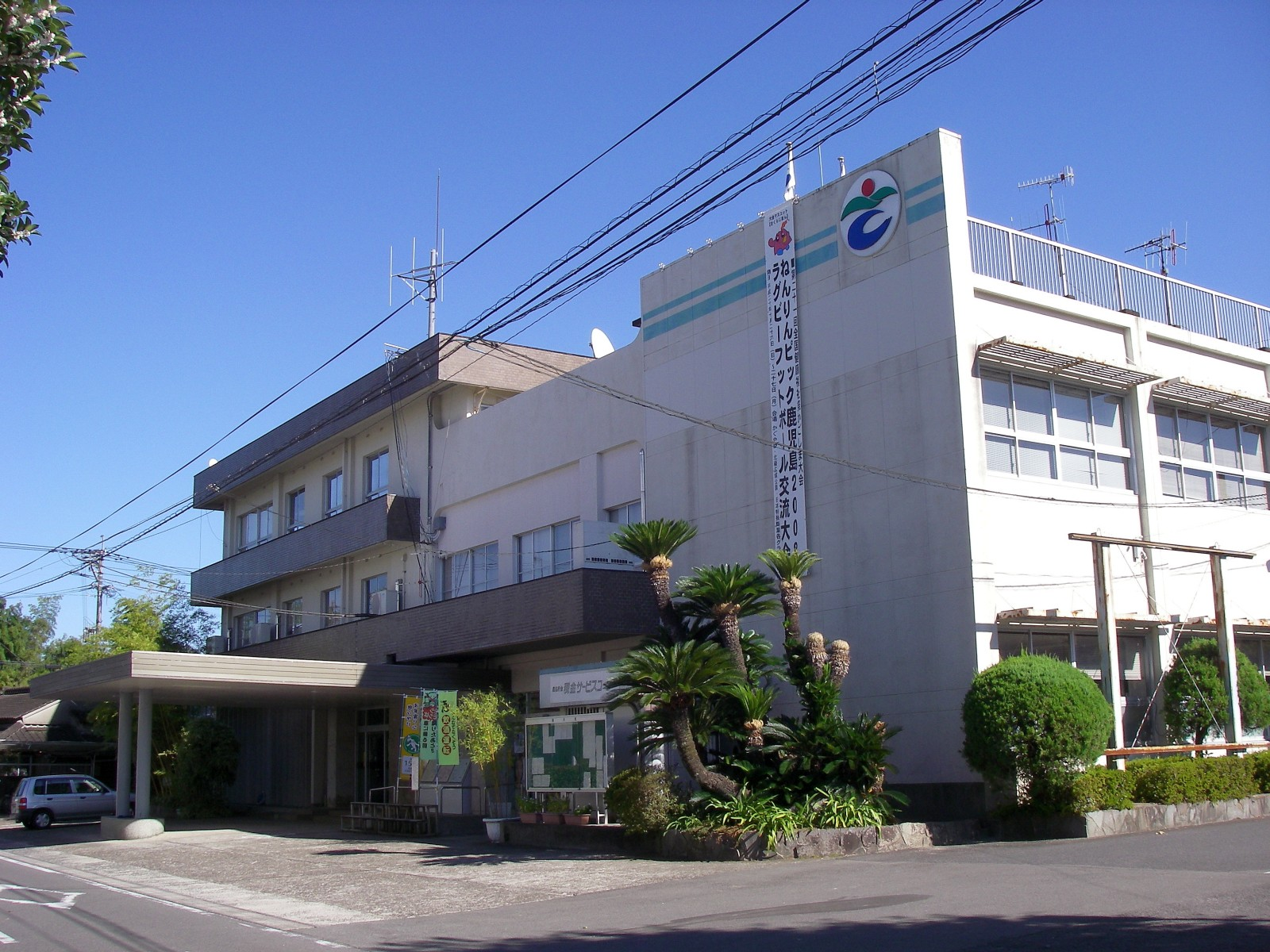
Satsuma Town Office

Satsuma (さつま町, Satsuma-chō) is a town in Satsuma District, Kagoshima Prefecture, Japan. As of 1 July 2024, the town had an estimated population of 18,399 in 8705 households, and a population density of 61 persons per km^{2}. The total area of the town is 303.90 km^{2} (117.34 sq mi).

== Geography ==
Satsuma is located in an inland region in the central-northern part of Kagoshima Prefecture.

=== Neighboring municipalities ===
Kagoshima Prefecture

- Aira
- Isa
- Izumi
- Kirishima
- Satsumasendai
- Yūsui

=== Climate ===
Satsuma has a humid subtropical climate (Köppen climate classification Cfa) with hot summers and mild winters. Precipitation is significant throughout the year, and is heavier in summer, especially the months of June and July. The average annual temperature in Satsuma is 16.6 °C (61.9 °F). The average annual rainfall is 2,762.7 mm (108.77 in) with June as the wettest month. The temperatures are highest on average in August, at around 27.2 °C (81.0 °F), and lowest in January, at around 5.9 °C (42.6 °F). Its record high is 38.8 °C (101.8 °F), reached on 3 August 2026, and its record low is −10.8 °C (12.6 °F), reached on 25 January 2016.

Climate data for Satsuma (1991−2020 normals, extremes 1976−present)
Month	Jan	Feb	Mar	Apr	May	Jun	Jul	Aug	Sep	Oct	Nov	Dec	Year
Record high °C (°F)	23.2 (73.8)	24.7 (76.5)	27.5 (81.5)	30.1 (86.2)	33.0 (91.4)	35.3 (95.5)	37.2 (99.0)	38.8 (101.8)	36.2 (97.2)	33.1 (91.6)	28.4 (83.1)	24.2 (75.6)	38.8 (101.8)
Mean daily maximum °C (°F)	11.6 (52.9)	13.2 (55.8)	16.7 (62.1)	21.5 (70.7)	25.7 (78.3)	27.7 (81.9)	31.6 (88.9)	32.6 (90.7)	30.0 (86.0)	25.3 (77.5)	19.6 (67.3)	13.9 (57.0)	22.5 (72.4)
Daily mean °C (°F)	5.9 (42.6)	7.2 (45.0)	10.5 (50.9)	15.1 (59.2)	19.4 (66.9)	22.9 (73.2)	26.7 (80.1)	27.2 (81.0)	24.3 (75.7)	18.8 (65.8)	13.1 (55.6)	7.8 (46.0)	16.6 (61.8)
Mean daily minimum °C (°F)	0.7 (33.3)	1.5 (34.7)	4.6 (40.3)	8.9 (48.0)	13.8 (56.8)	19.1 (66.4)	23.1 (73.6)	23.2 (73.8)	19.9 (67.8)	13.4 (56.1)	7.4 (45.3)	2.3 (36.1)	11.5 (52.7)
Record low °C (°F)	−10.8 (12.6)	−7.7 (18.1)	−5.3 (22.5)	−1.9 (28.6)	2.7 (36.9)	8.2 (46.8)	16.2 (61.2)	15.4 (59.7)	8.7 (47.7)	2.0 (35.6)	−2.8 (27.0)	−6.3 (20.7)	−10.8 (12.6)
Average precipitation mm (inches)	83.6 (3.29)	122.5 (4.82)	175.0 (6.89)	214.4 (8.44)	238.6 (9.39)	618.6 (24.35)	463.4 (18.24)	278.9 (10.98)	255.9 (10.07)	106.4 (4.19)	108.1 (4.26)	97.3 (3.83)	2,762.7 (108.77)
Average precipitation days (≥ 1.0 mm)	9.4	9.7	12.3	10.8	9.9	16.5	13.9	12.5	10.8	7.7	9.0	8.9	131.4
Mean monthly sunshine hours	128.3	139.1	166.0	177.6	180.0	111.2	175.2	195.6	165.3	186.6	157.0	136.6	1,919.4
Source: Japan Meteorological Agency

== Demographics ==
Per Japanese census data, the population of Satsuma in 2020 is 20,243 people. The town's population has been slowly declining since Satsuma's census began in 1950, and the town's population shows no sign of picking up as of 2020.

Historical population
Year	Pop.	±%
1950	50,621	—
1955	49,437	−2.3%
1960	46,010	−6.9%
1965	40,343	−12.3%
1970	35,005	−13.2%
1975	31,589	−9.8%
1980	30,650	−3.0%
1985	30,284	−1.2%
1990	29,063	−4.0%
1995	28,141	−3.2%
2000	27,331	−2.9%
2005	25,688	−6.0%
2010	24,120	−6.1%
2015	22,400	−7.1%
2020	20,243	−9.6%

== History ==
Satsuma is part of ancient Satsuma Province. It was part of Satsuma Domain in the Edo Period. The villages of Tsuruta, Yamazaki, Sashi, Miyanojo, Nagano, and Omura were established on April 1, 1889, with the creation of the modern municipalities system. Miyanojo was raised to town status on January 1, 1919, followed by Yamazaki on November 3, 1953. The villages of Nagano Village, Gyuma, and Nakatsugawa Village merged to form Satsuma Town on December 1, 1954. On March 22, 2005, the towns of Miyanojō, Tsuruda merged with Satsuma.

== Government ==
Satsuma has a mayor-council form of government with a directly elected mayor and a unicameral town council of 16 members. Satsuma contributes one member to the Kagoshima Prefectural Assembly. In terms of national politics, the town is part of the Kagoshima 3rd district of the lower house of the Diet of Japan.

== Economy ==
The main economy activity of Satsuma is agriculture and light manufacturing.

== Education ==
Satsuma has 6 public elementary schools and one public junior high school operated by the town government, and one public high school operated by the Kagoshima Prefectural Board of Education.

== Transportation ==
=== Railways ===
Since the abolition of the JNR Miyanojo Line in 1987, the town has had no passenger railway service. The nearest train station is the JR Kyushu Sendai Station.

=== Highways ===
- Minamikyushu Expressway
- National Route 267
- National Route 328
- National Route 504
