= Tōgō, Kagoshima =

Dissolved municipality in Kagoshima prefecture, Japan

Seal of Tōgō

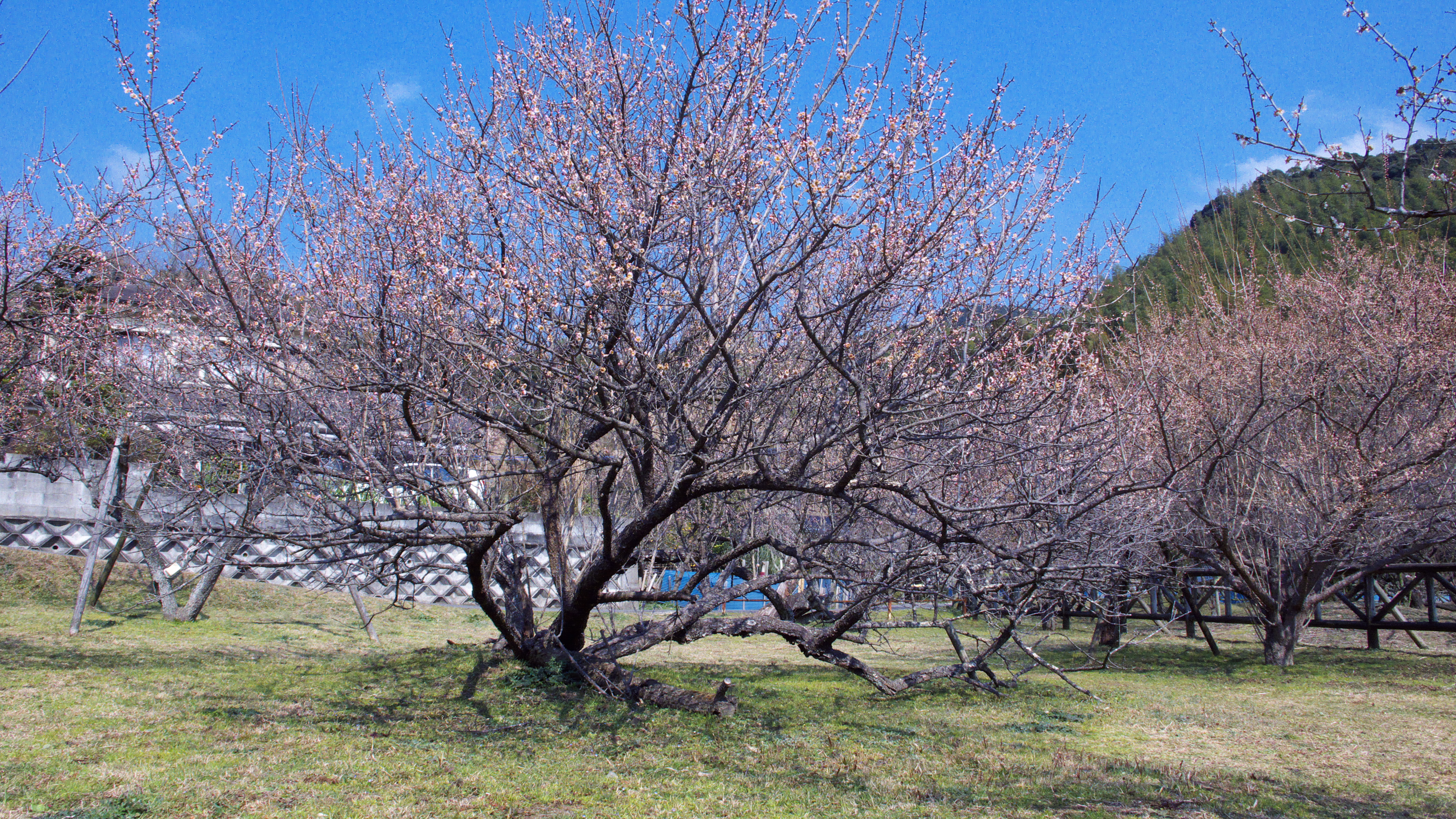
Garyūbai tree (臥龍梅) in Fujikawa Tenjin, designated a Japanese natural monument.

Tōgō (東郷町, Tōgō-chō) was a town located in Satsuma District, Kagoshima Prefecture, Japan.

As of 2003, the town had an estimated population of 5,987 and a density of 74.70 persons per km^{2}. The total area was 80.15 km^{2}.

On October 12, 2004, Tōgō, along with the city of Sendai, the towns of Hiwaki, Iriki and Kedōin, and the villages of Kamikoshiki, Kashima, Sato and Shimokoshiki (all from Satsuma District), was merged to create the city of Satsumasendai.

== Timeline ==
- 1889 - The village of Kami-Tōgō consisted of 6 neighborhoods (north to south): Onobuchi (斧淵村), Noze (南瀬村), Yamada (山田村), Torimaru (鳥丸村), Shishino (宍野村) and Fujikawa (藤川村).
- 1952 - The village of Kami-Tōgō became the town of Tōgō.
- 2004 - Tōgō, along with the city of Sendai, the towns of Hiwaki, Iriki and Kedōin, and the villages of Kamikoshiki, Kashima, Sato and Shimokoshiki (all from Satsuma District), was merged to create the city of Satsumasendai.

== Transport ==
=== Road ===
National Highway

- Route 267

== Schools ==
Junior High School

- Tōgō Junior High School

Elementary Schools

- Tōgō Elementary School
- Torimaru Elementary School
- Fujikawa Elementary School
- Noze Elementary School
- Yamada Elementary School

== Cultural and natural sites ==
- Garyūbai Tree: Located at Fujikawa Tenjin Shrine, this plum tree has been designated as a National Natural Monument since October 3, 1941. The tree is notable for its shape, which resembles a reclining dragon, and it attracts visitors during the blossom season from mid-February to early March.

== Notable people from Tōgō ==
- Masakiyo Maezono – Professional football and beach soccer player
