= Shimokoshiki, Kagoshima =

Dissolved municipality in Kagoshima prefecture, Japan

Shimokoshiki (下甑村, Shimokoshiki-son) was a village located in Satsuma District, Kagoshima Prefecture, Japan.

== Population ==
As of 2003, the village had an estimated population of 2,750 and the density of 47.72 persons per km^{2}. The total area was 57.63 km^{2}.

== History ==
On October 12, 2004, Shimokoshiki, along with the city of Sendai, the towns of Hiwaki, Iriki, Kedōin and Tōgō, and the villages of Kamikoshiki, Kashima and Sato (all from Satsuma District), was merged to create the city of Satsumasendai.
