= Kamikoshiki, Kagoshima =

Village in Kagoshima Prefecture, Japan

Kamikoshiki (上甑村, Kamikoshiki-mura) was a village located in Satsuma District, Kagoshima Prefecture, Japan.

As of 2003, the village had an estimated population of 1,900 and the density of 54.10 persons per km^{2}. The total area was 35.12 km^{2}.

On October 12, 2004, Kamikoshiki, along with the city of Sendai, the towns of Hiwaki, Iriki, Kedōin and Tōgō, and the villages of Kashima, Sato and Shimokoshiki (all from Satsuma District), was merged to create the city of Satsumasendai.
