= Takaono, Kagoshima =

Dissolved municipality in Kagoshima prefecture, Japan

Takaono (高尾野町, Takaono-chō) was a town located in Izumi District, Kagoshima Prefecture, Japan.

As of 2003, the town had an estimated population of 13,965 and the density of 196.28 persons per km^{2}. The total area was 71.15 km^{2}.

On March 13, 2006, Takaono, along with the town of Noda (also from Izumi District), was merged into the expanded city of Izumi and no longer exists as an independent municipality.
