= Sato, Kagoshima =

Dissolved municipality in Kagoshima prefecture, Japan

Sato (里村, Sato-mura) was a village located in Satsuma District, Kagoshima Prefecture, Japan.

== Population ==
As of 2003, the village had an estimated population of 1,445 and the density of 83.48 persons per km^{2}. The total area was 17.31 km^{2}.

== History ==
On October 12, 2004, Sato, along with the city of Sendai, the towns of Hiwaki, Iriki, Kedōin and Tōgō, and the villages of Kamikoshiki, Kashima and Shimokoshiki (all from Satsuma District), was merged to create the city of Satsumasendai.
