= Satsumasendai =

Satsumasendai 薩摩川内市
- City
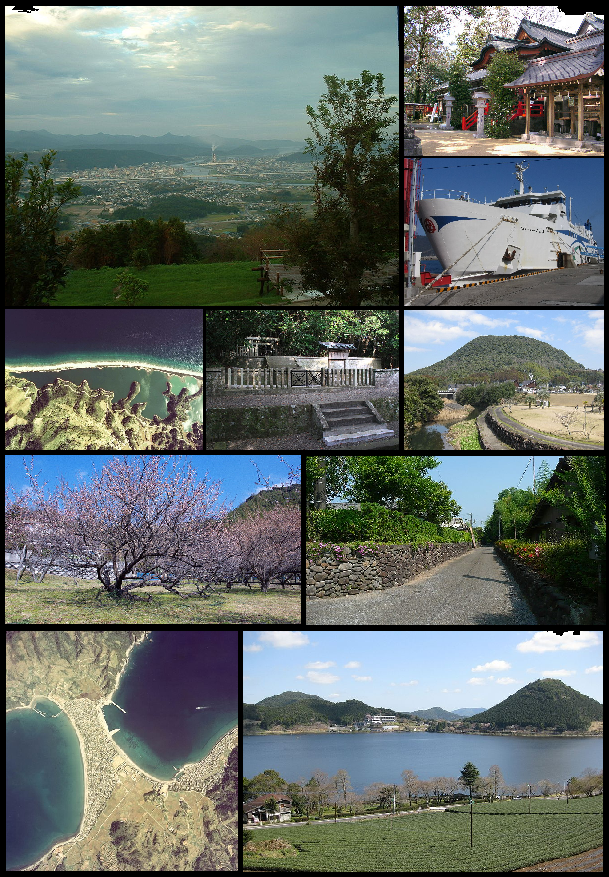
- From top to bottom, left to right: Niita Shrine, Kamikoshiki Island Nagame-no-hama, Iriki Fumoto, Imutaike, Panorama of Satsumasendai

- Flag Emblem
- Location of Satsumasendai in Kagoshima Prefecture

- Location in Japan
- Coordinates: 31°48′48″N 130°18′14″E
- Country: Japan
- Region: Kyushu
- Prefecture: Kagoshima

Government
  - Mayor: Hideo Iwakiri

Area
  - Total: 682.92 km^{2} (263.68 sq mi)

Population (July 1, 2024)
  - Total: 90,918
  - Density: 133.13/km^{2} (344.81/sq mi)
- Time zone: UTC+09:00 (JST)
- City hall address: 3-22, Kandachō, Satsumasendai-shi, Kagoshima-ken 895-8650
- Climate: Cfa
- Website: Official website
- Symbols
- Bird: Japanese white-eye
- Fish: Stream: Ayu; Oceanic: Slender sprat
- Flower: Lilium speciosum
- Tree: Round leaf holly (Ilex rotunda)

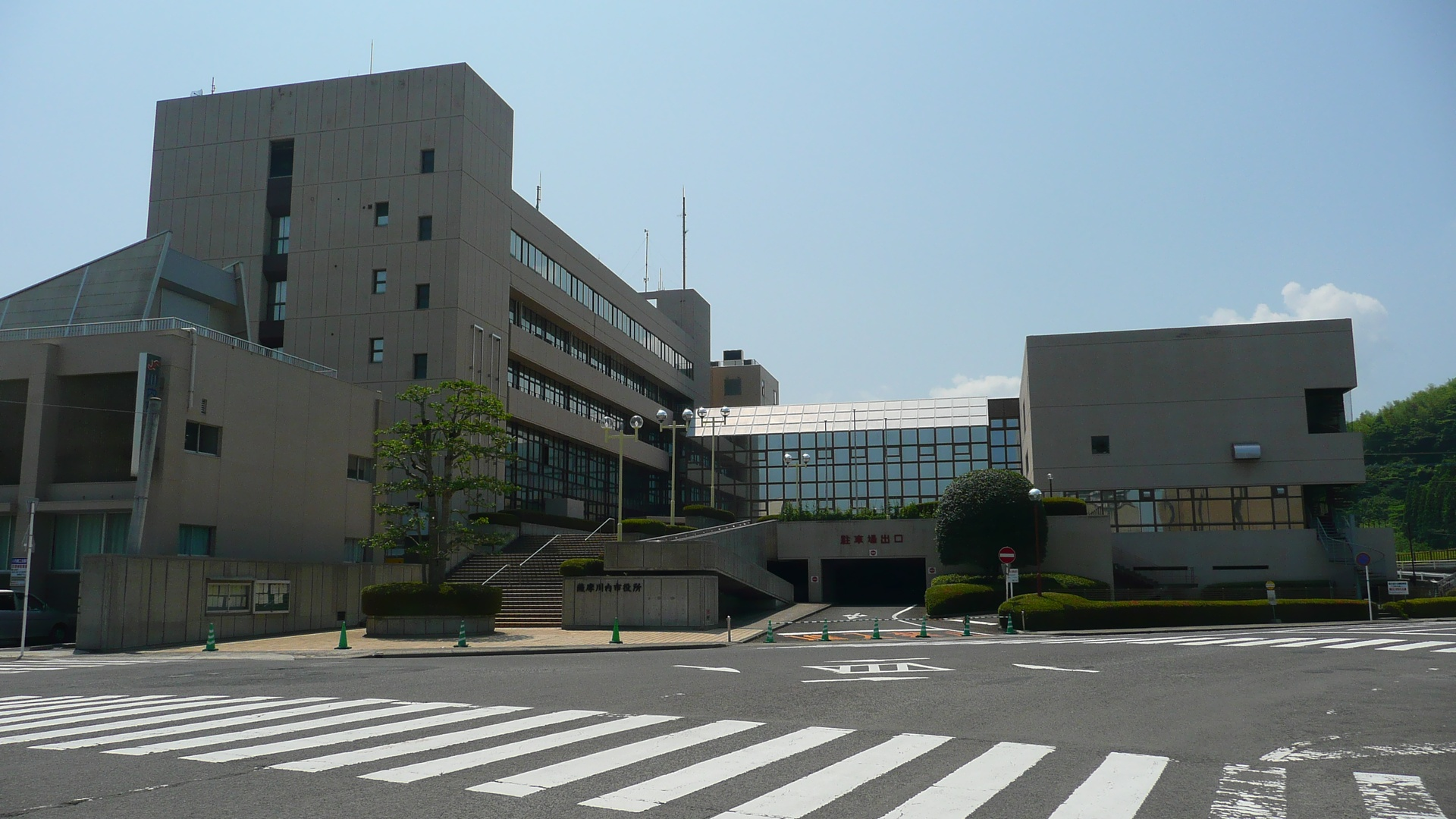
Satsumasendai City Hall

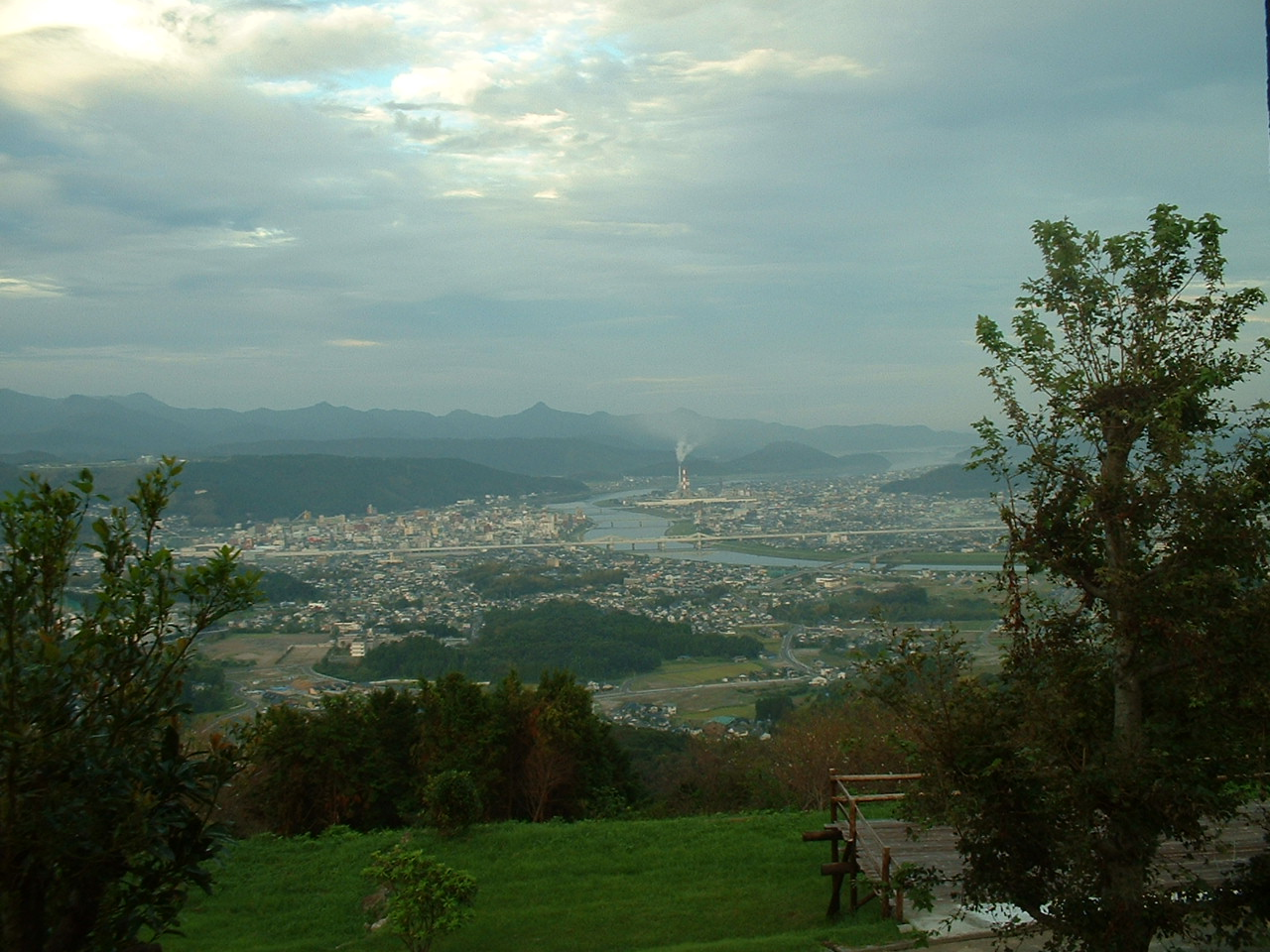
Photograph of the city.

Satsumasendai (薩摩川内市, Satsumasendai-shi) is a city located in Kagoshima Prefecture, Japan. As of 1 July 2024, the city had an estimated population of 90,918 in 46610 households, and a population density of 130 persons per km^{2}. The total area of the city is 682.92 km^{2} (263.68 sq mi).

== History ==
Satsumasendai is part of ancient Satsuma Province and is the location of the Nara period Satsuma Kokubun-ji and the provincial capital of Satsuma Province. It was part of the holdings of Satsuma Domain in the Edo period.

=== From 1889 to 2004 ===
- April 1, 1889 - Creation of the modern municipalities system
  - Satsuma District : the villages of Kumanojō, Takae, Nagatoshi, Hirasa, Kami-Tōgō, Shimo-Tōgō, Hiwaki and Iriki.
  - Taki District : the villages of Taki and Mizuhiki.
  - Minami-Isa District : the villages of Ōmura, Kuroki and Imuta.
  - Koshikijima District : the villages of Kami-Koshiki Shimo-Koshiki.
- March 29, 1896 - The districts of Taki, Minami-Isa and Koshikijima were merged into Satsuma District.
- May 20, 1929 - The villages of Kumanojō, Hirasa and Higashi-Mizuhiki were merged to become town of Sendai.
- July 1, 1933 - The village of Nishimizuhiki was renamed to Mizuhiki.
- February 11, 1940 - the town of Sendai was elevated city status to become the city of Sendai.
- November 10, 1940 - The village of Hiwaki was elevated to town status to become the town of Hiwaki.
- October 1, 1948 - The village of Iriki was elevated to town status to become the town of Iriki.
- April 1, 1951 - The village of Mizuhiki was merged into the city of Sendai.
- December 1, 1952 - The village of Kami-Tōgō was elevated to town status to become the town of Tōgō.
- April 1, 1955 - The villages of Ōmura, Kuroki and Imuta were merged to become the town of Kedōin.
- September 30, 1956 - The villages of Takae and Nagatoshi were merged into the city of Sendai.
- April 1, 1957
  - Part of Shimo-Tōgō was merged into the town of Tōgō and the village of Taki (respectively).
  - Remainder of Shimo-Tōgō was merged into the city of Sendai.
- January 1, 1960 - The village of Taki was elevated to town status to become the town of Taki.
- April 15, 1965 - The town of Taki was merged into city of Sendai.
- October 12, 2004 - the city of Satsumasendai was created from the merger of the city of Sendai, Kagoshima, the towns of Hiwaki, Iriki, Kedōin and Tōgō, and the Koshikijima Islands (which consisted of the villages of Kamikoshiki, Kashima, Sato and Shimokoshiki) (all from Satsuma District).

== Geography ==
Satsumasendai is located in northwest Kagoshima Prefecture, about 40 kilometers northwest of Kagoshima City, and covers almost the entire area of the Sendai Plain, facing the East China Sea to the west. The urban center is located in the western part of the city about 10 kilometers inland from the coast. The Sendai River, which flows east to west through the city area, has the second largest drainage area in Kyushu. In the eastern part of the city area is Imuta Pond, which was designated a Ramsar site on November 8, 2005.

The entire area of the Koshikijima Islands, in the East China Sea about 40 kilometers west of the mainland, is also included in the boundaries of Satsumasendai. The islands are also part of the Koshikijima Quasi-National Park.

== Neighboring municipalities ==
Kagoshima Prefecture

- Aira
- Akune
- Hioki
- Ichikikushikino
- Izumi
- Kagoshima
- Kirishima
- Satsuma

=== Climate ===
Satsumasendai has a humid subtropical climate (Köppen climate classification Cfa) with hot summers and mild winters. Precipitation is significant throughout the year, and is heavier in summer, especially the months of June and July. The average annual temperature in Satsumasendai is 18.4 °C (65.1 °F). The average annual rainfall is 2,429.7 mm (95.66 in) with June as the wettest month. The temperatures are highest on average in August, at around 28.0 °C (82.4 °F), and lowest in January, at around 9.4 °C (48.9 °F). Its record high is 37.5 °C (99.5 °F), reached on 19 August 2013, and its record low is −1.5 °C (29.3 °F), reached on 24 January 2016.

Climate data for Sendai, Satsumasendai (1991−2020 normals, extremes 1977−present)
Month	Jan	Feb	Mar	Apr	May	Jun	Jul	Aug	Sep	Oct	Nov	Dec	Year
Record high °C (°F)	22.1 (71.8)	24.6 (76.3)	26.5 (79.7)	29.1 (84.4)	31.9 (89.4)	34.6 (94.3)	36.9 (98.4)	38.6 (101.5)	36.0 (96.8)	32.9 (91.2)	28.0 (82.4)	24.5 (76.1)	38.6 (101.5)
Mean daily maximum °C (°F)	11.8 (53.2)	13.3 (55.9)	16.5 (61.7)	21.0 (69.8)	25.0 (77.0)	27.3 (81.1)	31.3 (88.3)	32.5 (90.5)	29.9 (85.8)	25.3 (77.5)	19.8 (67.6)	14.2 (57.6)	22.3 (72.2)
Daily mean °C (°F)	6.6 (43.9)	7.9 (46.2)	11.0 (51.8)	15.5 (59.9)	19.6 (67.3)	23.1 (73.6)	27.0 (80.6)	27.6 (81.7)	24.7 (76.5)	19.3 (66.7)	13.8 (56.8)	8.6 (47.5)	17.1 (62.7)
Mean daily minimum °C (°F)	2.0 (35.6)	2.8 (37.0)	5.8 (42.4)	10.2 (50.4)	14.8 (58.6)	19.6 (67.3)	23.6 (74.5)	24.0 (75.2)	20.7 (69.3)	14.6 (58.3)	8.8 (47.8)	3.8 (38.8)	12.6 (54.6)
Record low °C (°F)	−6.6 (20.1)	−7.5 (18.5)	−4.0 (24.8)	−1.7 (28.9)	5.4 (41.7)	10.6 (51.1)	16.8 (62.2)	17.1 (62.8)	8.8 (47.8)	2.7 (36.9)	−1.3 (29.7)	−4.9 (23.2)	−7.5 (18.5)
Average precipitation mm (inches)	85.0 (3.35)	114.0 (4.49)	156.5 (6.16)	179.2 (7.06)	208.6 (8.21)	506.5 (19.94)	334.0 (13.15)	239.5 (9.43)	231.4 (9.11)	95.2 (3.75)	110.7 (4.36)	105.3 (4.15)	2,368.8 (93.26)
Average precipitation days (≥ 1.0 mm)	10.4	10.3	12.6	10.6	9.8	15.6	11.9	11.4	10.4	7.6	9.2	10.4	130.2
Mean monthly sunshine hours	111.3	125.8	159.1	177.5	177.8	107.5	173.2	202.9	172.8	182.0	147.6	120.8	1,858.2
Source: Japan Meteorological Agency

Climate data for Naka-Koshiki-shima, Satsumasendai (1991−2020 normals, extremes 1977−present)
Month	Jan	Feb	Mar	Apr	May	Jun	Jul	Aug	Sep	Oct	Nov	Dec	Year
Record high °C (°F)	22.0 (71.6)	23.1 (73.6)	25.3 (77.5)	28.5 (83.3)	30.0 (86.0)	32.9 (91.2)	35.5 (95.9)	37.5 (99.5)	35.5 (95.9)	31.8 (89.2)	27.7 (81.9)	24.6 (76.3)	37.5 (99.5)
Mean daily maximum °C (°F)	12.2 (54.0)	13.1 (55.6)	15.9 (60.6)	20.1 (68.2)	23.9 (75.0)	26.4 (79.5)	30.4 (86.7)	31.9 (89.4)	29.1 (84.4)	24.6 (76.3)	19.5 (67.1)	14.5 (58.1)	21.8 (71.2)
Daily mean °C (°F)	9.4 (48.9)	10.0 (50.0)	12.5 (54.5)	16.2 (61.2)	19.9 (67.8)	23.1 (73.6)	27.0 (80.6)	28.0 (82.4)	25.4 (77.7)	21.0 (69.8)	16.2 (61.2)	11.5 (52.7)	18.3 (65.0)
Mean daily minimum °C (°F)	6.4 (43.5)	6.6 (43.9)	8.9 (48.0)	12.4 (54.3)	16.1 (61.0)	20.2 (68.4)	24.4 (75.9)	25.0 (77.0)	22.3 (72.1)	17.7 (63.9)	12.8 (55.0)	8.4 (47.1)	15.1 (59.2)
Record low °C (°F)	−1.5 (29.3)	−1.3 (29.7)	−0.1 (31.8)	3.4 (38.1)	8.6 (47.5)	12.4 (54.3)	17.2 (63.0)	19.5 (67.1)	13.9 (57.0)	8.4 (47.1)	4.4 (39.9)	−0.1 (31.8)	−1.5 (29.3)
Average precipitation mm (inches)	103.5 (4.07)	116.0 (4.57)	158.9 (6.26)	208.7 (8.22)	211.2 (8.31)	475.5 (18.72)	302.8 (11.92)	215.6 (8.49)	265.0 (10.43)	110.9 (4.37)	139.2 (5.48)	122.4 (4.82)	2,429.7 (95.66)
Average precipitation days (≥ 1.0 mm)	12.0	10.8	12.6	10.5	10.2	14.5	10.2	9.9	10.0	7.2	9.5	11.0	128.4
Mean monthly sunshine hours	87.0	106.3	154.0	180.3	185.2	124.4	186.6	226.7	189.0	187.6	138.8	103.1	1,868.6
Source: Japan Meteorological Agency

== Demographics ==
Per Japanese census data, the population of Satsumasendai in 2020 is 92,403 people. Satsumasendai's population has been declining slowly since the census began in 1950, although there was a brief recovery in the 1980s.

Historical population

Year	Pop.	±%
1950	150,937	—
1955	146,197	−3.1%
1960	133,799	−8.5%
1965	119,063	−11.0%
1970	104,295	−12.4%
1975	99,151	−4.9%
1980	102,143	+3.0%
1985	108,105	+5.8%

Year	Pop.	±%
1990	106,432	−1.5%
1995	106,737	+0.3%
2000	105,464	−1.2%
2005	102,370	−2.9%
2010	99,558	−2.7%
2015	96,076	−3.5%
2020	92,403	−3.8%
2025	89,400	−3.2%

Satsumasendai population statistics

== Government ==
Satsumasendai has a mayor-council form of government with a directly elected mayor and a unicameral city council of 26 members. Satsumasendai contributes three members to the Kagoshima Prefectural Assembly. In terms of national politics, the city is part of the Kagoshima 3rd district of the lower house of the Diet of Japan.

== Economy ==
The city has a mixed economy and is a regional commercial and industrial center. A major employer is Kyushu Electric's Sendai Nuclear Power Plant.In addition, JR Kyushu's Sendai Vehicle Center and South Japan Gas Headquarters are located.

== Education ==
Satsumasendai has 26 public elementary schools, 13 public junior high schools and one public high school by the city government, and three public high schools operated by the Kagoshima Prefectural Board of Education. There is also one private combined middle/high school. The city is also home to Kagoshima Immaculate Heart University, founded in 1994, which has a small population of foreign students.

== Transportation ==
=== Railways ===
JR Kyushu - Kyushu Shinkansen

Sendai

JR Kyushu - Kagoshima Main Line

■ Sendai - Kumanojo - Kobanchaya

Hisatsu Orange Railway

- Nishikata - Satsuma-Taki - Kusamichi - Kami Sendai - Sendai

=== Highways ===
- Minamikyushu Expressway
- National Route 3
- National Route 267
- National Route 328
- National Route 504

== Sister cities ==
- Changshu, China, friendship city since 1991
- Malu Town, Jiading District, China, friendship city since 1995
- (South Korea) Changnyeong County, South Gyeongsang, Korea, friendship city since 2012

== Notable people from Satsumasendai ==
- Manami Konishi, actress, singer
- Tadahiro Matsushita, politician
- Rina Yamashita - professional wrestler
