= Kashima, Kagoshima =

Former village in Kagoshima Prefecture, Japan

Kashima 鹿島村
- Former village
- Location in Japan
- Country: Japan
- Region: Kyushu
- Prefecture: Kagoshima Prefecture
- District: Satsuma
- Merged: October 12, 2004

Area
  - Total: 8.68 km^{2} (3.35 sq mi)

Population (2003)
  - Total: 838
  - Density: 96.54/km^{2} (250.0/sq mi)
- Time zone: UTC+09:00 (JST)

Kashima (鹿島村 (Kashima-mura)) was a village located in Satsuma District, Kagoshima Prefecture, Japan.

As of 2003, the village had an estimated population of 838, with a population density of 96.54 persons per km². The total area was 8.68 km².

On October 12, 2004, Kashima merged with the city of Sendai, the towns of Hiwaki, Iriki, Kedōin, and Tōgō, and the villages of Kamikoshiki, Sato, and Shimokoshiki (all from Satsuma District) to form the city of Satsumasendai.

== History ==
Kashima was historically part of Satsuma Province, a domain governed by the powerful Shimazu clan. The Satsuma Domain played a key role in the Meiji Restoration, significantly influencing Japan's transition from feudal rule to the modern era.

== Geography ==
Located in the northwestern part of Kagoshima Prefecture, Kashima covered an area of 8.68 km². The landscape featured a mix of hilly terrain and coastal areas typical of the Satsuma Peninsula.

== Economy ==
The economy of Kashima was primarily based on agriculture and coastal fishing. Local farms cultivated crops such as rice, sweet potatoes, and tea, while fisheries operated in nearby waters.

== Education ==
Kashima maintained educational facilities for local children, including at least one primary school. Older students typically commuted to neighboring towns for secondary education.

== Transportation ==
Kashima was accessible via regional road networks. Public transportation primarily consisted of community buses connecting to the city of Sendai and nearby towns. Rail access was available from Sendai Station, linking the area to broader Kagoshima Prefecture.

== Culture ==
Like many communities in the Satsuma region, Kashima preserved traditional folk customs and local festivals. Cultural practices often reflected influences from both Shinto and Buddhism, with community festivals (matsuri) held seasonally.

== Legacy ==
Though no longer an independent municipality, the area formerly known as Kashima retains its identity as part of the greater city of Satsumasendai. Its rural character, cultural heritage, and historical significance continue to influence the region.
