= Kedōin, Kagoshima =

Dissolved municipality in Kagoshima prefecture, Japan

Kedōin (祁答院町, Kedōin-chō) was a town located in Satsuma District, Kagoshima Prefecture, Japan.

As of 2003, the town had an estimated population of 4,499 and the density of 54.49 persons per km^{2}. The total area was 82.56 km^{2}.

On October 12, 2004, Kedōin, along with the city of Sendai, the towns of Hiwaki, Iriki and Tōgō, and the villages of Kamikoshiki, Kashima, Sato and Shimokoshiki (all from Satsuma District), was merged to create the city of Satsumasendai.
