= Hiwaki, Kagoshima =

Dissolved municipality in Kagoshima prefecture, Japan

Hiwaki (樋脇町, Hiwaki-chō) was a town located in Satsuma District, Kagoshima Prefecture, Japan.

As of 2003, the town had an estimated population of 7,780 and the density of 121.22 persons per km^{2}. The total area was 64.18 km^{2}.

On October 12, 2004, Hiwaki, along with the city of Sendai, the towns of Iriki, Kedōin and Tōgō, and the villages of Kamikoshiki, Kashima, Sato and Shimokoshiki (all from Satsuma District), was merged to create the city of Satsumasendai.
