= Tsuruda, Kagoshima =

Dissolved municipality in Kagoshima prefecture, Japan

Tsuruda (鶴田町, Tsuruda-chō) was a town in Satsuma District, Kagoshima Prefecture, Japan.

As of 2003, the town had an estimated population of 4,853 and the density of 62.23 persons per km^{2}. The total area was 77.99 km^{2}.

On March 22, 2005, Tsuruda, along with the town of Miyanojō (also from Satsuma District), was merged into the expanded town of Satsuma (former name: 薩摩町; current name: さつま町) and no longer exists as an independent municipality.
