= Satsuma District, Kagoshima =

District in Kagoshima prefecture, Japan

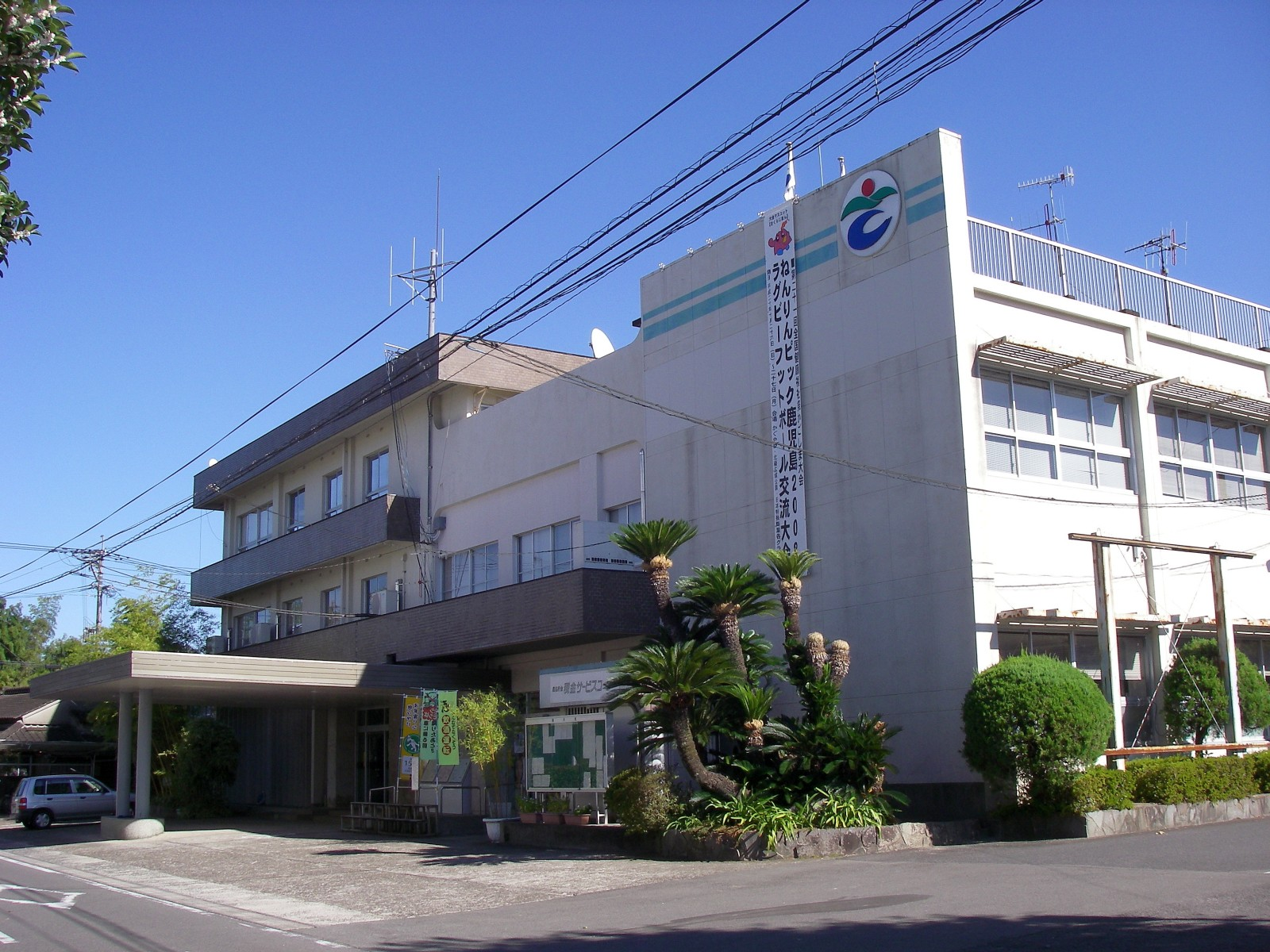
Satsuma town offices

The location of Satsuma in Kagoshima Prefecture.

Satsuma (薩摩郡, Satsuma-gun) is a district located in Kagoshima Prefecture, Japan.

As of the March 22, 2005 merger the district consists of the single town of Satsuma.

== Mergers ==
- On October 12, 2004 the old city of Sendai, the towns of Hiwaki, Iriki, Kedōin and Tōgō, and the villages of Kamikoshiki, Kashima, Sato and Shimokoshiki merged to form the new city of Satsumasendai, dramatically decreasing the size and population of the district to 26,587 people and 303.43 km^{2}, making a density of 87.62 persons per km^{2}.
- On March 22, 2005 the towns of Satsuma (薩摩町), Miyanojō and Tsuruda merged to form the new town of Satsuma (さつま町).
