= Miyanojō, Kagoshima =

Dissolved municipality in Kagoshima prefecture, Japan

Miyanojō (宮之城町, Miyanojō-chō) was a town in Satsuma District, Kagoshima Prefecture, Japan.

As of 2003, the town had an estimated population of 17,346 and the density of 118.85 persons per km^{2}. The total area was 145.95 km^{2}.

On March 22, 2005, Miyanojō, along with the town of Tsuruda (also from Satsuma District), was merged into the expanded town of Satsuma (former name: 薩摩町; current name: さつま町) and no longer exists as an independent municipality.

It was also sometimes known at "take no furusato" or the hometown of bamboo.
