= Iriki, Kagoshima =

Dissolved municipality in Kagoshima prefecture, Japan

Iriki (入来町, Iriki-chō) was a town located in Satsuma District, Kagoshima Prefecture, Japan.

As of 2003, the town had an estimated population of 6,250 and the density of 86.35 persons per km^{2}. The total area was 72.38 km^{2}.

On October 12, 2004, Iriki, along with the city of Sendai, the towns of Hiwaki, Kedōin and Tōgō, and the villages of Kamikoshiki, Kashima, Sato and Shimokoshiki (all from Satsuma District), was merged to create the city of Satsumasendai.
