= Japan National Route 267 =

Road in Japan

National Route 267
- 国道267号
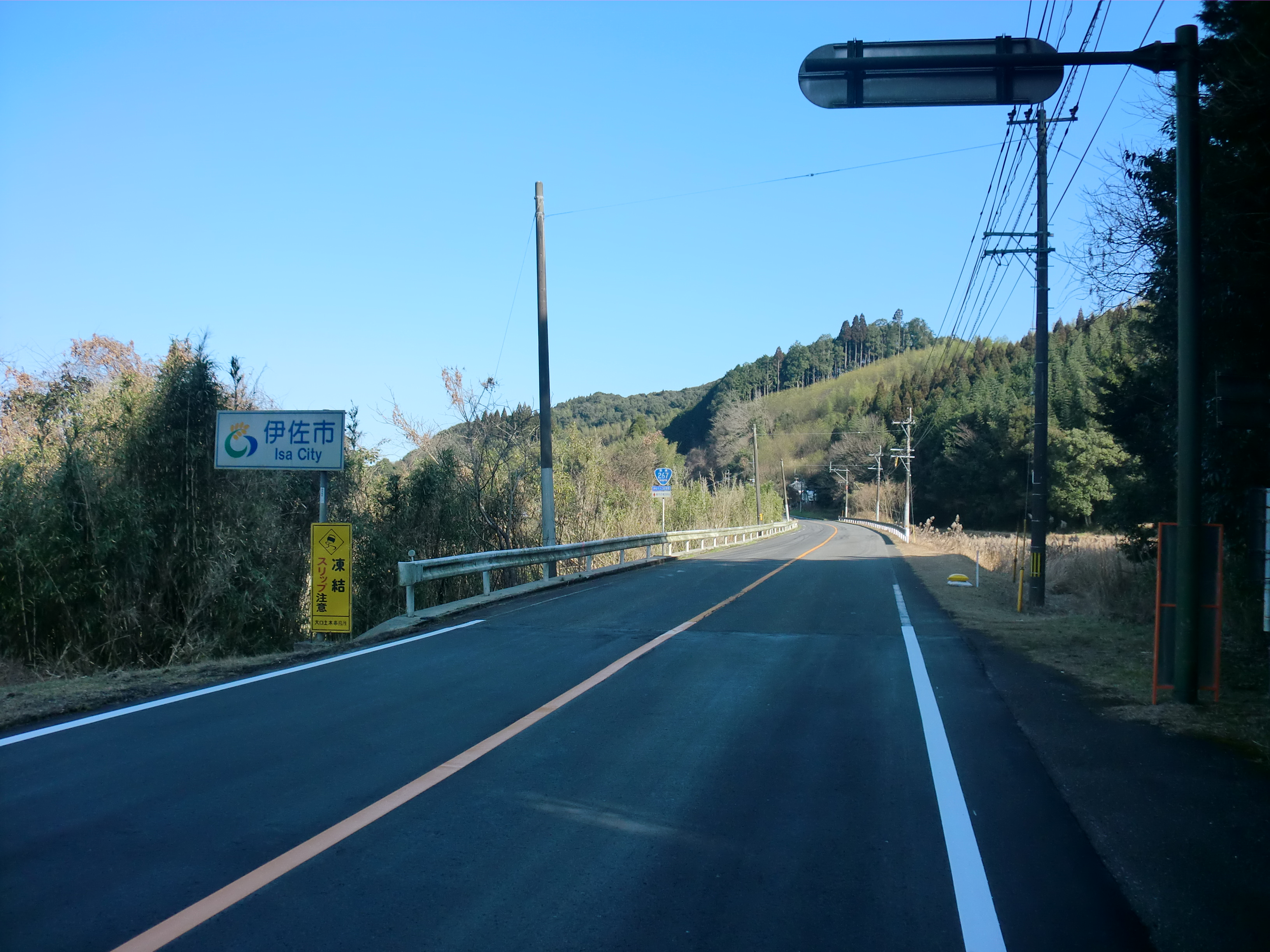

Route information
- Length: 82.7 km (51.4 mi)

Location
- Country: Japan

Highway system
- National highways of Japan; Expressways of Japan
← National Route 266	→ National Route 268

National Route 267 is a national highway of Japan connecting Hitoyoshi, Kumamoto and Satsumasendai, Kagoshima in Japan, with a total length of 82.7 km (51.39 mi).
