= Izumi District, Kagoshima =

District in Kagoshima prefecture, Japan

Coordinates: 32.179°N 130.152°E

The location of Izumi District in Kagoshima

Izumi (出水郡, Izumi-gun) is a geographical district located in Kagoshima Prefecture, Japan. The district contains one town, Nagashima.
