= List of Dotch Cooking Show episodes =

The following is an episode list for the Japanese television series Dotch Cooking Show.

== Dotch Cooking Show ==
=== 1997 - 2005 ===
Episode	Air Date	Dish 1 (Jp)	Dish 2 (Jp)	Dish 1 (En)	Dish 2 (En)
001	April 17, 1997	ローストビーフ	北京ダック	Roast Beef	Peking Duck
002	April 24, 1997	天ぷら	串揚げ	Tempura	Deep Fried Skewers
003	May 1, 1997	五目炒飯	五目焼きそば	Gomoku Fried Rice	Gomoku Yakisoba
004	May 8, 1997	ロールキャベツ	メンチカツ	Cabbage Rolls	Breaded Meat Patty
005	May 15, 1997	ピッツァ	広島風お好み焼き	Pizza	Hiroshima Okonomiyaki
006	May 22, 1997	親子丼	カツ丼	Oyakodon	Breaded Pork Bowl
007	May 29, 1997	青椒牛肉絲	酢豚	Pepper Steak	Sweet and Sour Pork
008	June 5, 1997	ラザニア	マカロニグラタン	Lasagna	Macaroni and Cheese
009	June 12, 1997	パエリア	石焼ビビンバ	Paella	Stone-Cooked Bibimbap
010	June 19, 1997	ビーフストロガノフ	カツカレー	Beef Stroganoff	Curried Breaded Pork
011	June 26, 1997	鮎の炊き込みご飯 - 鮎のお吸い物 - 鮎の塩焼き	鰻の肝吸い - 鰻の白焼き - 鰻の白焼き	Ayu Sweetfish	Eel
012	July 3, 1997	春巻	餃子	Spring Rolls	Gyoza
013	July 10, 1997	皿うどん	焼きビーフン	Udon Noodles	Grilled Rice Vermicelli
014	July 17, 1997	冷たいパスタ	冷やし中華	Cold Pasta	Chinese Cold Noodles
015	July 24, 1997	鉄火丼	牛丼	Tuna Bowl	Beef Bowl
016	July 31, 1997	担担麺	冷麺	Dandan Noodles	Naengmyeon
017	August 7, 1997	ピロシキ	小籠包	Pirozhki	Xiaolongbao
018	August 14, 1997	リゾット	ドリア	Risotto	Doria
019	August 21, 1997	スペアリブ	タンドリーチキン	Spare Ribs	Tandoori Chicken
020	August 28, 1997	海老フライ	豚肉のしょうが焼き	Fried Shrimp	Pork Ginger
021	September 4, 1997	麦とろご飯	中華ちまき	Yam and Brown Rice	Zongzi
022	September 11, 1997	太巻き寿司	タコス	Thick-rolled sushi	Tacos
023	October 9, 1997	松茸	サンマ	Matsutake Mushrooms	Pacific Saury (Sanma)
024	October 16, 1997	天丼	海鮮炒飯	Fried Fish Bowl	Seafood Fried Rice
025	October 23, 1997	ホットドッグ	ハンバーガー	Hot Dogs	Hamburgers
026	October 30, 1997	炊き込みご飯	シーフードピラフ	Takikomi Rice	Seafood Pilaf
027	November 6, 1997	モンブラン	ミルフィーユ	Mont Blanc	Mille-feuille
028	November 13, 1997	ドライカレー	オムライス	Dry Curry	Omelette Rice
029	November 20, 1997	ジャージャー麺	スパゲッティミートソース	Zhajiangmian	Spaghetti and Meat Sauce
030	November 27, 1997	カキフライ	ポテトコロッケ	Panko Fried Oysters	Potato Croquettes
031	December 4, 1997	ブイヤベース	ビーフシチュー	Bouillabaisse	Beef Stew
032	December 11, 1997	しゃぶしゃぶ	すき焼き	Shabu-shabu	Sukiyaki
033	December 18, 1997	鴨のオレンジソース	仔羊のロースト	Duck à L'Orange	Roast Lamb
034	January 8, 1998	鯛	海老	Snapper (Bream)	Prawns
035	January 15, 1998	カレー南蛮うどん	ワンタンメン	Nanban Curry Udon	Wonton Noodles
036	January 22, 1998	あんこう鍋	鶏の水炊き	Angler Stew	Stew with Chicken Broth
037	January 29, 1998	カニクリームコロッケ	ハンバーグ	Crab Cream Croquette	Hamburger Steak
038	February 5, 1998	海鮮丼	ビフテキ丼	Seafood Bowl	Beef Bowl
039	February 12, 1998	アップルパイ	チョコレートケーキ	Apple Pie	Chocolate Cake
040	February 19, 1998	鍋焼きうどん	五目うま煮そば	Nabe Yaki Udon	Gomoku Umani Soba
041	February 26, 1998	おでん	チゲ	Oden	Jjigae
042	March 5, 1998	ナポリタン	明太子スパゲッティ	Napolitan	Mentaiko Spaghetti
043	March 12, 1998	醤油ラーメン	味噌ラーメン	Soy Sauce Ramen	Miso Ramen
044	April 2, 1998	天丼	親子丼	Fried Fish Bowl	Oyakodon
045	April 16, 1998	大阪風お好み焼き	広島風お好み焼き	Osaka Okonomiyaki	Hiroshima Okonomiyaki
046	April 23, 1998	エビのチリソース	酢豚	Prawns in Chili Sauce	Sweet and Sour Pork
047	April 30, 1998	五目いなり	カツサンド	Gomoku Inari Sushi	Breaded Pork Sandwich
048	May 7, 1998	チョコレートパフェ	プリンアラモード	Chocolate Parfait	Pudding à la Mode
049	May 14, 1998	ハヤシライス	シーフードカレー	Hashed Beef	Seafood Curry
050	May 21, 1998	フォアグラ	フカヒレ	Foie Gras	Shark Fin
051	May 28, 1998	ちらし寿司	手巻き寿司	Chirashi Sushi	Hand-Rolled Sushi
052	June 4, 1998	天ざる	冷やし中華	Tenzaru Soba	Chinese Cold Noodles
053	June 11, 1998	ラビオリ	水餃子	Ravioli	Sui Gyoza
054	June 18, 1998	うな丼	焼肉丼	Eel Bowl	Yakiniku Bowl
055	June 25, 1998	回鍋肉	麻婆豆腐	Twice Cooked Pork	Mapo Tofu
056	July 2, 1998	和風ハンバーグ弁当	チキンバスケット	Hamburger Bento	Chicken Basket
057	July 9, 1998	クリーム白玉あんみつ	杏仁豆腐	Cream Shiratama Anmitsu	Almond Tofu
058	July 16, 1998	いか飯 - いかそうめん - いか肝焼き	たこ刺身 - たこ飯 - やわらか煮	Squid	Octopus
059	July 23, 1998	冷たいパスタ	冷麺	Cold Pasta	Naengmyeon
060	July 30, 1998	中華丼	カレー丼	Chūkadon	Curry Rice Bowl
061	August 6, 1998	ブイヤベース	トムヤムクン	Bouillabaisse	Tom Yam Kung
062	August 13, 1998	鰹のたたき	冷やししゃぶしゃぶ	Bonito Tataki	Chilled Shabu Shabu
063	August 20, 1998	アワビの姿煮	北京ダック	Boiled Abalone	Peking Duck
064	August 27, 1998	焼き鳥	串揚げ	Yakitori	Deep Fried Skewers
065	September 3, 1998	ピッツァ	韓国風お好み焼き	PIzza	Korean Okonomiyaki
066	September 10, 1998	鯵のたたき - 鯵の塩焼き - 南蛮漬け - 鯵の椀物	鰯のつみれ汁 - 鰯の香梅揚げ - 鰯の刺身 - 鰯の山椒煮	Horse Mackerel	Iwashi Sardines
067	October 8, 1998	京風懐石	香港飲茶	Kyoto Kaiseki	Hong Kong Dim Sum
068	October 15, 1998	鮭茶漬け - 鮭はらす - 焼き鮭	秋刀魚のつみれ汁 - 秋刀魚の塩焼き	Salmon	Pacific Saury (Sanma)
069	October 22, 1998	中華おこげ	カルビクッパ	Chinese Scorched Rice	Kalbi Gukbap
070	October 29, 1998	鴨南そば	パイコー麺	Duck Nanman Soba	Fried Pork Rib Ramen
071	November 5, 1998	肉あんかけ炒飯	石焼ビビンバ	Meat and Egg Soup Fried Rice	Stone-Cooked Bibimbap
072	November 12, 1998	中華海鮮鍋	ちゃんこ鍋	Chinese Seafood Stew	Chanko Nabe
073	November 19, 1998	みそ煮込みうどん	タンメン	Miso Nikomi Udon	Tanmen
074	November 26, 1998	オムライス	シーフードグラタン	Omelette Rice	Seafood Gratin
075	December 3, 1998	イクラ丼	ウニ丼	Fish Egg Bowl	Sea Urchin Bowl
076	December 10, 1998	肉まん	たこ焼き	Nikuman	Takoyaki
077	December 17, 1998	クリームシチュー	豚汁	Cream Stew	Pork Soup
078	January 7, 1999	カレーライス	ラーメン	Curry Rice	Ramen
079	January 14, 1999	カニすき	焼肉	Kanisuki	Yakiniku
080	January 21, 1999	ちゃんぽん	焼きビーフン	Champon	Grilled Rice Vermicelli
081	January 28, 1999	ヒレかつ	豚肉のしょうが焼き	Hirekatsu	Pork Ginger
082	February 4, 1999	ロールキャベツ	カキフライ	Cabbage Rolls	Panko Fried Oysters
083	February 11, 1999	鍋焼きうどん	中華粥	Nabe Yaki Udon	Chinese Porridge
084	February 18, 1999	コロッケパン	カレーパン	Croquette Sandwich	Curry Buns
085	February 25, 1999	ビーフシチュー	豚の角煮	Beef Stew	Braised Pork Belly
086	March 4, 1999	カレーピラフ	キムチチャーハン	Curry Pilaf	Kimchi Fried Rice
087	March 11, 1999	きつねうどん	チャーシュー麺	Kitsune Udon	Chashumen
088	March 18, 1999	かき揚げ丼	ネギトロ丼	Tempura Fritter Rice Bowl	Tuna Belly Scrap Bowl
089	April 15, 1999	もんじゃ焼き	広島風お好み焼き	Monjayaki	Hiroshima Okonomiyaki
090	April 22, 1999	カニ焼売	エビ餃子	Crab Shumai	Shrimp Gyoza
091	April 29, 1999	アジフライ	メンチカツ	Fried Horse Mackerel (Aji)	Breaded Meat Patty
092	May 6, 1999	チリドッグ	テリヤキバーガー	Chili Dog	Teriyaki Burger
093	May 13, 1999	ナポリタン	ソース焼きそば	Napolitan	Sauce Yakisoba
094	May 20, 1999	焼き鳥丼	すきやき丼	Yakitori Bowl	Sukiyaki Don
095	June 3, 1999	ハヤシライス	カレーライス	Hashed Beef	Curry Rice
096	June 10, 1999	鉄火丼	うな丼	Tuna Bowl	Eel Bowl
097	June 17, 1999	ステーキ丼	穴子ちらし	Steak Bowl	Ocean Eel Bowl
098	June 24, 1999	洋朝食	和朝食	Western Breakfast	Japanese Breakfast
099	July 1, 1999	春巻	餃子	Spring Rolls	Gyoza
100	July 8, 1999	冷やし中華	ビビンめん	Chinese Cold Noodles	Korean Cold Sweet Spicy Noodles
101	July 15, 1999	天丼	カツ丼	Fried Fish Bowl	Breaded Pork Bowl
102	July 22, 1999	ローストビーフ	鰹のたたき	Roast Beef	Bonito Tataki
103	July 29, 1999	担々麺	カレー南蛮うどん	Bamboo Noodles	Nanban Curry Udon
104	August 5, 1999	タラコスパゲッティ	ミートボールスパゲッティ	Cod Roe Spaghetti	Spaghetti and Meatballs
105	August 12, 1999	麦とろご飯	冷やしそうめん	Yam and Brown Rice	Chinese Cold Noodle Soup
106	August 19, 1999	ワッフル	クレープ	Waffles	Crepes
107	August 26, 1999	シャンバラヤ	ビーフカレー	Jambalaya	Beef Curry
108	September 2, 1999	チキンカツ	ポークソテー	Chicken Cutlet	Sauteed Pork
109	September 9, 1999	フカヒレの姿煮	アワビの姿煮	Boiled Shark Fin	Boiled Abalone
110	September 16, 1999	親子丼	オムライス	Oyakodon	Omelette Rice
111	October 14, 1999	松茸ごはん - 松茸の焼き物 - 松茸土瓶蒸し - 松茸の天ぷら	秋刀魚の塩焼き - 秋刀魚のつみれ汁 - クリおこわ - 茄子の田楽 - 茄子の揚げ煮	Matsutake Mushrooms	Eggplant
112	October 21, 1999	塩ラーメン	味噌ラーメン	Salt Ramen	Miso Ramen
113	October 28, 1999	クラブハウスサンド	太巻き寿司	Club Sandwich	Thick Rolled Sushi
114	November 4, 1999	五目釜めし	石焼きビビンバ	Gomoku Stone Rice	Stone-Cooked Bibimbap
115	November 11, 1999	酢豚	鶏のカシューナッツ炒め	Sweet and Sour Pork	Stir Fried Cashew Chicken
116	November 18, 1999	おでん	海鮮チゲ	Oden	Seafood Jjigae
117	November 25, 1999	カキフライ	ビーフコロッケ	Panko Fried Oysters	Beef Croquette
118	December 2, 1999	うどんすき	鶏の水炊き	Udon Soup	Stew with Chicken Broth
119	December 9, 1999	フルーツタルト	チーズケーキ	Fruit Tart	Cheesecake
120	December 16, 1999	広島風お好み焼き	大阪風お好み焼き	Hiroshima Okonomiyaki	Osaka Okonomiyaki 2
121	January 6, 2000	天ぷらそば - いなり寿司	醤油ラーメン - 炒飯	Tensoba and Inari Sushi	Ramen and Fried Rice
122	January 13, 2000	カニ雑炊	鯛茶漬け	Crab Zosui	Snapper (Bream)
123	January 20, 2000	鶏煮込みそば	海鮮かた焼きそば	Soba in Chicken Broth	Seafood Yakisoba
124	January 27, 2000	クラムチャウダー	豚汁	Clam Chowder	Pork Soup
125	February 3, 2000	カキの土手鍋	ちゃんこ鍋	Oyster Noodle Soup	Chanko Nabe
126	February 10, 2000	中華ちまき	肉まん	Zongzi	Nikuman
127	February 17, 2000	鰤の照焼	豚肉の生姜焼き	Teriyaki Yellowtail	Pork Ginger
128	February 24, 2000	ボンゴレ・ロッソ	サケのクリームパスタ	Spaghetti alle Vongole in Rosso	Creamy Salmon Pasta
129	March 2, 2000	ポークカレー	霜降り牛バラ飯	Pork Curry	Marbled Beef Chuck Rib Meal
130	March 9, 2000	イチゴ大福	ゴマ団子	Strawberry Daifuku	Sesame Dumplings
131	March 16, 2000	タコの酢の物- タコのお造り - タコの煮物 - タコの揚げ物 - たこ飯 - タコの明石焼き	イカの和え物 - イカのお造り - イカの煮物 - イカの揚げ物 - イカ飯 - イカの炭火焼	Octopus	Squid 2
132	April 13, 2000	すきやき	プルコギ	Sukiyaki	Bulgogi
133	April 20, 2000	力うどん	ワンタンメン	Chikara Udon	Wonton Noodles
134	April 27, 2000	天津飯	麻婆丼	Crab Omelette on Rice	Spicy Beef and Tofu Bowl
135	May 4, 2000	大阪寿司	カツサンド	Osaka Style Sushi	Breaded Pork Sandwich
136	May 11, 2000	煮込みハンバーグ	鶏の竜田揚げ	Stewed Hamburger Steak	Soy Marinated Fried Chicken
137	May 18, 2000	鴨蒸籠	中華つけめん	Soba with Hot Duck Sauce	Chinese Dipping Noodles
138	May 25, 2000	串揚げ	焼き鳥	Deep Fried Skewers	Grilled Skewers
139	June 1, 2000	フィッシュバーガー	ホットドック	Fishburger	Hot Dog
140	June 8, 2000	豚キムチ	ニラレバ炒め	Pork Kimchee	Sauteed Liver and Chives
141	June 15, 2000	深川丼	カレー丼	Clam Miso Rice Bowl	Curry Rice Bowl
142	June 22, 2000	鱧寿司 - 鱧の椀物 - 鱧のおとし	うな重 - うなぎの肝吸い - うなぎの蒲焼き	Dagger-Tooth Pike Conger	Eel
143	June 29, 2000	ティラミス	マンゴープリン	Tiramisu	Mango Pudding
144	July 6, 2000	なめこおろしそば	バンバンジーの冷やし中華	Daikon Radish and Mushroom Soba	Chinese Cold Noodles with Banbanji Chicken
145	July 13, 2000	モダン焼き	海鮮チヂミ	Modanyaki	Seafood Scallion Pancakes
146	July 20, 2000	担々麺	ジャージャー麺	Bamboo Noodles	Zhajiangmian
147	July 27, 2000	天丼	かつ丼	Fried Fish Bowl	Breaded Pork Bowl
148	August 3, 2000	水羊羹	杏仁豆腐	Mizu Yokan	Almond Tofu
149	August 10, 2000	冷たいパスタ	そうめん	Cold Pasta	Somen
150	August 17, 2000	夏野菜のカレー	海鮮あんかけ炒飯	Summer Vegetable Curry	Fried Rice with Seafood Sauce
151	August 24, 2000	ウニ丼	ビフテキ丼	Sea Urchin Bowl	Beef Bowl
152	August 31, 2000	鯵のお造り - 鯵の塩焼き - 鯵の南蛮づけ - 鯵の潮汁	鰯のお造り - 鰯の塩焼き - 鰯のつみれ汁	Horse Mackerel	European Pilchard
153	September 7, 2000	回鍋肉	麻婆茄子	Twice Cooked Pork	Eggplant Stirfry
154	September 14, 2000	エビフライ	ビーフカツ	Fried Shrimp	Beef Cutlet
155	October 12, 2000	ゴマ	ニンニク	Sesame	Garlic
156	October 19, 2000	醤油ラーメン	塩ラーメン	Soy Sauce Ramen	Salt Ramen
157	October 26, 2000	もんじゃ焼き	タコ焼き	Monjayaki	Takoyaki
158	November 2, 2000	ビーフコロッケ	メンチカツ	Beef Croquette	Breaded Meat Patty
159	November 9, 2000	シュークリーム	どら焼き	Cream Puffs	Red Bean Pancakes
160	November 16, 2000	オムライス	ハヤシライス	Omelette Rice	Hashed Beef
161	November 23, 2000	すき焼きうどん	パイコー麺	Sukiyaki Udon	Fried Pork Rib Ramen
162	November 30, 2000	マカロニグラタン	ピザ	Macaroni and Cheese	Pizza
163	December 7, 2000	ちゃんこ鍋	カニチゲ	Chanko Nabe	Crab Jjigae
164	December 14, 2000	チョコレートケーキ	ショートケーキ	Chocolate Cake	Shortcake
165	January 4, 2001	天ぷらそば - 親子丼	ラーメン - 炒飯	Tensoba and Oyaokodon	Ramen and Fried Rice 2
166	January 11, 2001	サケイクラ丼	ネギトロ丼	Fish Egg Bowl	Tuna Belly Scrap Bowl
167	January 18, 2001	ナポリタン	ソース焼きそば	Napolitan	Sauce Yakisoba
168	January 25, 2001	フカヒレそば	鴨南そば	Shark Fin	Duck Nanman Soba
169	February 1, 2001	大学いも	たい焼き	Candied Sweet Potatoes	Taiyaki
170	February 8, 2001	鍋焼きうどん	ユッケジャンクッパ	Nabe Yaki Udon	Yukgaejang
171	February 15, 2001	チャーシューまん	チーズバーガー	Pork Buns	Cheeseburgers
172	February 22, 2001	タンシチュー	ロールキャベツ	Tongue Stew	Cabbage Rolls
173	March 1, 2001	団子	ドーナツ	Dumplings	Donuts
174	March 8, 2001	豚バラ飯	中華丼	Pork Belly Rice	Chūkadon
175	March 15, 2001	豚肉のしょうが焼き	和風ハンバーグ	Pork Ginger	Hamburger Steak
176	April 12, 2001	カレーパン	メロンパン	Curry Buns	Melon Buns
177	April 19, 2001	山菜おこわ	シーフードピラフ	Ferns and Sweet Rice	Seafood Pilaf
178	April 26, 2001	カツカレー	牛丼	Curried Breaded Pork	Beef Bowl
179	May 3, 2001	五目いなり	ミックスサンド	Gomoku Inari Sushi	Mixed Sandwiches
180	May 10, 2001	鯖味噌	ニラレバ	Miso Mackerel	Sauteed Pork Liver
181	May 17, 2001	オムハヤシ	ドライカレー	Hashed Beef with Omelette	Dry Curry
182	May 24, 2001	ホットケーキ	ピザトースト	Pancakes	PIzza Toast
183	May 31, 2001	かき揚げ丼	きじ焼き丼	Tempura Fritter Rice Bowl	Teriyaki Poultry Bowl
184	June 7, 2001	麦とろご飯	焼肉丼	Yam and Brown Rice	Yakiniku Bowl
185	June 14, 2001	天ざるうどん	冷やし中華	Tenzaru Udon	Chinese Cold Noodles
186	June 21, 2001	味噌	マヨネーズ	Miso	Mayonnaise
187	June 28, 2001	スペアリブ	中華風鶏の唐揚げ	Spare Ribs	Chinese Fried Chicken
188	July 5, 2001	串揚げ	串焼き	Deep Fried Skewers	Grilled Skewers 2
189	July 12, 2001	鰹のたたき - 鰹の酒匂 - 鰹の揚げ物 - 鰹茶漬け	サザエのおつくり - サザエの肝和え - サザエのつぼ焼き - サザエの炊き込みご飯	Bonito aka Skipjack Tuna	Sazae aka Horned Turban Sea Snail
190	July 19, 2001	焼うどん	焼きビーフン	Stir Fried Udon Noodles	Grilled Rice Vermicelli
191	July 26, 2001	鰻の蒲焼	ガーリックステーキ	Grilled Eel	Garlic Steak
192	August 2, 2001	鉄火丼	ウニ丼	Tuna Bowl	Sea Urchin Bowl
193	August 9, 2001	夏野菜のリゾット	海鮮中華粥	Summer Vegetable Risotto	Chinese Seafood Porridge
194	August 16, 2001	氷宇治金時	フルーツパフェ	Green Tea Shaved Ice	Fruit Parfait
195	August 23, 2001	ローストビーフ	冷やし豚しゃぶ	Roast Beef	Chilled Shabu Shabu
196	August 30, 2001	味噌つけ麺	ビビンめん	Miso Dipping Noodles	Korean Cold Sweet Spicy Noodles
197	September 6, 2001	ワッフル	フレンチトースト	Waffles	French Toast
198	September 13, 2001	餃子	焼売	Gyoza	Shumai
199	September 20, 2001	コロッケパン	焼きそばパン	Croquette Sandwich	Yakisoba Sandwich
200	October 11, 2001	秋刀魚	松茸	Pacific Saury (Sanma)	Matsutake Mushrooms 2
201	October 18, 2001	札幌ラーメン	博多ラーメン	Sapporo Ramen	Hakata Ramen
202	October 25, 2001	石焼ビビンバ	クッパ	Stone-Cooked Bibimbap	Gukbap
203	November 1, 2001	たこ飯	いかめし	Octopus Rice	Squid Rice
204	November 8, 2001	おでん定食	豚汁定食	Oden Meal	Pork Soup Meal
205	November 15, 2001	カキごはん	サケ炒飯	Oyster Rice	Salmon Rice
206	November 22, 2001	カレーうどん	麻婆麺	Curry Udon	Mapo Noodles
207	November 29, 2001	ミックスフライ	ポークソテー	Fried Seafood Mix	Sauteed Pork
208	December 6, 2001	すっぽん鍋	あんこう鍋	Softshell Turtle Stew	Angler Stew
209	December 13, 2001	アップルパイ	クレープ	Apple Pie	Crepes
210	December 20, 2001	石狩鍋	白子のたらちり	Ishikari Stew	Cod Milt Stew
211	January 3, 2002	東京もんじゃ焼	大坂お好み焼き	Tokyo Monjayaki	Osaka Okonomiyaki
212	January 10, 2002	チキンカレー	パイコー飯	Chicken Curry	Fried Pork Rib Meal
213	January 17, 2002	キッシュ	ホットサンド	Quiche	Hot Sandwich
214	January 24, 2002	かに玉	海老のマヨネーズ和え	Crab Egg Foo Yung	Shrimp Salad
215	January 31, 2002	金目の煮付け	鰤の照焼	Boiled Goldeye	Teriyaki Yellowtail
216	February 7, 2002	洋ナシのタルト	いちごのムース	Pear Tart	Strawberry Mousse
217	February 14, 2002	みそ煮込みうどん	鶏煮込みそば	Miso Nikomi Udon	Soba in Chicken Broth
218	February 21, 2002	ミネストローネ	ワンタン	Minestrone	Wonton
219	February 28, 2002	カニしゃぶ	豚しゃぶ	Crab Shabu	Pork Shabu
220	March 7, 2002	八宝菜	回鍋肉	Palbochae	Twice Cooked Pork
221	March 14, 2002	ハンバーグサンド	ソーセージのチリドック	Patty Melt	Chili Dog
222	April 11, 2002	赤飯 - 尾頭付鯛の焼き物	ちらし寿司	Akaihama and Snapper (Bream)	Chirashi Sushi
223	April 18, 2002	コロッケそば	角煮ラーメン	Croquette Soba	Porkbelly Ramen
224	April 25, 2002	クラブハウスサンド	カルフォルニアロール	Club Sandwich	California Roll
225	May 2, 2002	高菜炒飯	キムチ炒飯	Pickled Mustard Fried Rice	Kimchi Fried Rice
226	May 9, 2002	天ぷら定食	カツ煮定食	Tempura Meal	Boiled Breaded Pork Meal
227	May 16, 2002	タコス	生春巻き	Tacos	Raw Spring Rolls
228	May 23, 2002	深川めし	穴子めし	Fukagawa Clam Meal	Conger Eel Meal
229	May 30, 2002	蟹爪のフライ	肉団子	Fried Crab Claws	Meat Dumplings
230	June 6, 2002	鯵の開き	鮭の塩焼き	Grilled Horse Mackerel	Grilled Salmon
231	June 13, 2002	冷やし中華	冷やしうどん	Chinese Cold Noodles	Cold Udon
232	June 20, 2002	豆大福	フルーツロールケーキ	Bean Daifuku	Fruit Roll Cake
233	June 27, 2002	お茶漬け	焼きおにぎり	Green Tea Rice Soup	Grilled Rice Balls
234	July 4, 2002	しょうゆとんこつラーメン	塩ラーメン	Soy Sauce Ramen	Salt Ramen 2
235	July 11, 2002	冷やし豚しゃぶ	鰹のたたき	Chilled Shabu Shabu	Bonito Tataki
236	July 18, 2002	ウニ丼	うな丼	Sea Urchin Bowl	Eel Bowl
237	July 25, 2002	プリンアラモード	チョコレートパフェ	Pudding à la Mode	Chocolate Parfait
238	August 1, 2002	シーフードカレー	ハヤシライス	Seafood Curry	Hashed Beef 2
239	August 8, 2002	麦とろ	そうめん	Yam and Brown Rice	Somen
240	August 15, 2002	韮レバ炒め	ゴーヤチャンプル	Liver and Chives Stir Fry	Bitter Melon Chanpuru
241	August 22, 2002	串揚げ	焼き鳥	Deep Fried Skewers	Yakitori
242	August 29, 2002	ナポリタン	ソース焼きそば	Napolitan	Sauce Yakisoba
243	September 5, 2002	焼売	焼餃子	Shumai	Fried Gyoza
244	September 12, 2002	トロ鉄火丼	ビフテキ丼	Tuna Bowl	Beef Bowl 2
245	October 10, 2002	牛丼	かつ丼	Beef Bowl	Breaded Pork Bowl
246	October 17, 2002	石焼きビビンバ	ユッケジャンクッパ	Stone-Cooked Bibimbap	Yukgaejang
247	October 24, 2002	天ざる	みそつけめん	Tenzaru Soba	Miso Tsukemen
248	October 31, 2002	ピザ	たこ焼き	Pizza	Takoyaki
249	November 7, 2002	和風ハンバーグ	豚肉の生姜焼き	Hamburger Steak	Pork Ginger
250	November 14, 2002	肉まん	カレーパン	Nikuman	Curry Buns
251	November 21, 2002	讃岐うどん	札幌ラーメン	Sanuki Udon	Sapporo Ramen
252	November 28, 2002	カルボナーラ	ミートソース	Carbonara	Meat Sauce
253	December 5, 2002	あんかけチャーハン	豚ばら飯	Egg Soup Fried Rice	Pork Belly Rice
254	December 12, 2002	おでん	すき焼き	Oden	Sukiyaki
255	January 9, 2003	親子丼	サケイクラ丼	Oyakodon	Fish Egg Bowl
256	January 16, 2003	オムハヤシ	カツカレー	Hashed Beef with Omelette	Curried Breaded Pork
257	January 23, 2003	豚汁	キムチチゲ	Pork Soup	Kimchi Jjigae
258	January 30, 2003	カニクリームコロッケ	ビーフシチュー	Crab Cream Croquettes	Beef Stew
259	February 6, 2003	鯖味噌	肉じゃが	Miso Mackerel	Japanese Meat and Potato Stew
260	February 13, 2003	海老のチリソース	青椒牛肉絲	Prawns in Chili Sauce	Pepper Steak
261	February 20, 2003	おしるこ	アイスクリーム	Sweet Red Bean Soup	Ice Cream
262	February 27, 2003	鍋焼きうどん	カレー南蛮うどん	Nabe Yaki Udon	Nanban Curry Udon
263	March 6, 2003	フィッシュバーガー	ローストビーフサンド	Fishburger	Roast Beef Sandwich
264	March 13, 2003	パエリア	五目釜飯	Paella	Gomoku Stone Rice
265	April 10, 2003	寿司	天ぷら	Sushi	Tempura
266	April 17, 2003	鰆の西京焼き	金目の煮付け	Saikyo Miso Marinated Sawara (Mackerel)	Simmered Kinmedai (Alfonsino)
267	April 24, 2003	タンメン	五目そば	Tanmen	Gomoku Noodles
268	May 1, 2003	ねぎ焼き	お好み焼き	Negiyaki	Okonomiyaki
269	May 8, 2003	メンチカツ	アジフライ	Breaded Meat Patty	Fried Horse Mackerel (Aji) 2
270	May 15, 2003	ひつまぶし	ネギトロ丼	Nagoya Eel Bowl	Tuna Belly Scrap Bowl
271	May 22, 2003	シュークリーム	今川焼き	Cream Puffs	Sweet Bean Cakes
272	May 29, 2003	海の幸のスパゲッティ	森のキノコのスパゲッティ	Seafood Spaghetti	Wild Mushroom Spaghetti
273	June 5, 2003	冷やし中華	冷たい讃岐うどん	Chinese Cold Noodles	Cold Sanuki Udon
274	June 12, 2003	カジキマグロの照焼	ビーフステーキ	Teriyaki Swordfish	Steak
275	June 19, 2003	麻婆茄子	木耳の卵炒め	Mapo Eggplant	Wood Ear Omelette
276	June 26, 2003	豆腐	納豆	Tofu	Natto
277	July 3, 2003	担担麺	韓国冷麺	Dandan Noodles	Naengmyeon
278	July 10, 2003	ソースかつ丼	カレー丼	Sauce Breaded Pork Bowl	Curry Rice Bowl
279	July 17, 2003	ベーグルサンド	ホットサンド	Bagel Sandwich	Hot Sandwich
280	July 24, 2003	氷宇治金時	イタリアンジェラート	Green Tea Shaved Ice	Gelato
281	July 31, 2003	餃子	鶏の唐揚げ	Gyoza	Karaage
282	August 7, 2003	ドライカレー	明太キムチ炒飯	Dry Curry	Pollack and Kimchi Fried Rice
283	August 14, 2003	ウニ丼	麦とろ	Sea Urchin Bowl	Yam and Brown Rice
284	August 21, 2003	稲庭うどん	冷たいパスタ	Inaniwa Udon	Cold Pasta
285	August 28, 2003	ゴマプリン	コーヒーゼリー	Sesame	Jellied Coffee
286	September 4, 2003	ジャージャー麺	カルビうどん	Zhajiangmian	Kalbi Udon
287	September 11, 2003	マグロの釜焼き	スペアリブ	Head of Tuna	Spare Ribs
288	September 18, 2003	イカ墨のパスタ	ワタリガニのパスタ	Squid Ink Pasta	Blue Crab Pasta
289	October 16, 2003	ネギ味噌ラーメン	塩バターラーメン	Green Onion Miso Ramen	Salt Butter Ramen
290	October 23, 2003	のり巻き	おにぎり	Norimaki (Sushi Roll)	Onigiri (Rice Ball)
291	October 30, 2003	海鮮丼	豚丼	Seafood Bowl	Pork Bowl
292	November 6, 2003	オムカレー	茄子と挽肉のカレー	Curried Omelette Rice	Eggpland and Minced Meat Curry
293	November 13, 2003	栗スイーツ	さつま芋スイーツ	Chestnut Desserts	Sweet Potato Desserts
294	November 20, 2003	中華まん	おかずパン	Chinese Buns	Savory Pastries
295	November 27, 2003	クラムチャウダー	ミネストローネ	Clam Chowder	Minestrone
296	December 4, 2003	きりたんぽ	塩ちゃんこ	Rice Paste on Sticks	Salt Stew
297	December 11, 2003	カキのグラタン	煮込みハンバーグ	Oysters au Gratin	Stewed Hamburger Steak
298	December 18, 2003 Christmas!	ローストビーフ	ローストチキン	Roast Beef	Roast Chicken
299	January 1, 2004	カレー	ラーメン	Curry	Ramen
300	January 15, 2004	豚玉デラックスお好み焼き	カレーもんじゃ焼き	Deluxe Pork Okonomiyaki	Curry Monjayaki
301	January 22, 2004	鮭のバター焼き	ホッケの塩焼き	Butter Sauteed Salmon	Hokke Mackerel
302	January 29, 2004	ユッケビビンバ	カニレタス炒飯	Yukke Bibimbap	Crab Fried Rice
303	February 5, 2004	鰤大根	肉豆腐	Daikon Amberjack Stew	Meat and Tofu
304	February 12, 2004	フォンダンショコラ	フルーツタルト	Chocolate Fondant	Fruit Tarts
305	February 19, 2004	豆乳鍋	キムチ鍋	Soy Milk Stew	Kimchi Stew
306	February 26, 2004	黒酢の酢豚	伊勢海老のチリソース	Black Vinegar Sweet and Sour Pork	Ise Prawns in Chili Sauce
307	March 4, 2004	かぼちゃのクリームコロッケ	一口かつ	Pumpkin Cream Croquette	Pork Nuggets
308	March 11, 2004	ハニートースト	スイートデニッシュ	Honey Toast	Danish
309	April 15, 2004	豚丼	牛丼	Pork Bowl	Beef Bowl
310	April 22, 2004	豚バラめし	味噌カツ丼	Pork Belly Meal	Miso Breaded Pork Bowl
311	April 29, 2004	クロワッサンサンド	おいなりさん	Croissant Sandwich	Inari Sushi
312	May 6, 2004	鉄板焼	炭火焼	Griddled	Charcoal Grilled
313	May 13, 2004	串カツ	やきとん	Skewered Pork	Grilled Pork
314	May 20, 2004	ナシゴレン	ロコモコ	Nasi Goreng	Loco Moco
315	May 27, 2004	ねぎ焼き	オムそば	Negiyaki	Omelette Yakisoba Noodles
316	June 3, 2004	沖縄ソーキそば	讃岐釜玉うどん	Okinawa Soki Noodles	Sanuki Udon Noodles
317	June 10, 2004	冷やし坦々麺	カレーラーメン	Cold Tantan Ramen	Curry Ramen
318	June 17, 2004	餃子ライス	肉野菜炒めライス	Gyoza Rice	Pork Vegetable Stir Fry
319	June 24, 2004	牛タン定食	カルビ定食	Beef Tongue Meal	Kalbi Meal
320	July 1, 2004	ジンギスカン	バーベキュー	Hokkaido Grilled Lamb	Barbeque
321	July 8, 2004	タイカレー	夏野菜カレー	Thai Curry	Summer Vegetable Curry
322	July 15, 2004	麻婆春雨	揚げ豆腐のピリ辛煮込み	Mapo Rice Noodles	Fried Tofu in Chili Sauce
323	July 22, 2004	チキンテリヤキバーガー	エビフライサンド	Teriyaki Chicken Burger	Fried Shrimp Sandwich
324	July 29, 2004	イカ	タコ	Squid	Octopus 3
325	August 5, 2004	うな丼	かつ丼	Eel Bowl	Breaded Pork Bowl
326	August 12, 2004	焼きビーフン	フォー	Grilled Rice Vermicelli	Pho
327	August 26, 2004	中華鶏のから揚げ	牛肉のオイスターソース炒め	Chinese Fried Chicken	Beef Stir Fry with Oyster Sauce
328	September 2, 2004	焼うどん	ナポリタン	Grilled Udon	Napolitan
329	September 9, 2004	蟹炒飯	五目焼きそば	Chinese Crab Fried Rice	Gomoku Yakisoba
330	September 16, 2004	海鮮ちらし	ビフテキ丼	Seafood Bowl	Beef Bowl 2
331	October 14, 2004	ラーメンライス	お好み焼き定食	Ramen Rice	Okonomiyaki Meal
332	October 21, 2004	松茸ご飯	鯛めし	Matsutake Mushroom	Snapper (Bream)
333	October 28, 2004	豚肉の生姜焼き	ハンバーグ	Pork Ginger	Hamburger
334	November 4, 2004	おでん	焼き鳥	Oden	Yakitori
335	November 11, 2004	カツカレー	ハヤシライス	Curried Breaded Pork	Hashed Beef
336	November 18, 2004	シュークリーム	串団子	Cream Puffs	Skewer Dumplings
337	November 25, 2004	鯖塩	カジキの照焼	Mackerel	Blue Marlin
338	December 2, 2004	ビーフシチュー	豚の角煮	Beef Stew	Braised Pork Belly (Kakuni) 2
339	December 9, 2004	あんこう鍋	カニすき	Angler Stew	Kanisuki
340	December 16, 2004	フカヒレ	アワビ	Shark Fin	Abalone
341	January 20, 2005	黒ごま担々麺	えび天カレーうどん	Black Sesame Bamboo Noodles	Tempura Shrimp Curry Udon
342	January 27, 2005	豚汁	海鮮チゲ	Pork Soup	Seafood Jjigae
343	February 3, 2005	鰤の照焼	キンキの煮付け	Teriyaki Yellowtail	Boiled Thornyhead
344	February 10, 2005	抹茶パフェ	チョコレートパフェ	Green Tea Parfait	Chocolate Parfait
345	February 17, 2005	豚しゃぶ	きりたんぽ鍋	Pork Shabu	Stew with Rice Paste on a Stick
346	February 24, 2005	かき揚げ丼	鉄火丼	Tempura Fritter Rice Bowl	Tuna Bowl
347	March 3, 2005	サンドイッチ	天むす	Sandwich	Tempura Shrimp Rice Balls
348	March 10, 2005	ピザ	海鮮チヂミ	Pizza	Seafood Scallion Pancakes
349	March 17, 2005	メンチカツ	オムレツ	Breaded Meat Patty	Omelette

== New Dotch Cooking Show ==
Episode	Original Air Date	Sekiguchi's Kitchen	Miyake's Kitchen	Winner (Votes)
01	2005-04-14	Ten don Chef: Ryoji Hamamoto; Special Ingredient: Anago from Taima, Nagasaki Prefecture	Oyakodon Chef: Kouou Sugiura; Special Ingredient: Game fowl from Shinbashi, Tokyo	Sekiguchi (7-4)
02	2005-04-21	Hayashi rice Chef: Jun Hida; Special Ingredient: Beef from Erimo, Hokkaidō	Omurice Chef: Naoki Saito; Special Ingredient: Kinuko's "Bun-bun Tomato" Ketchup from Tomioka, Gunma	Sekiguchi (8-3)
03	2005-04-28	Ginger Pork stir fry Chef: Kazuki Kondo; Special Ingredient: "Kanjuku (Fully ripe/mature)" pork from Nojiri, Miyagi Prefecture	Deep fried horse mackerel Chef: Tetsuya Kawamoto; Special Ingredient: "Hagi no se tsuki" brand horse mackerel (aji) from Oshima, Hagi, Yamaguchi Prefecture	Miyake (3-8)
04	2005-05-05	Ramen with soy sauce (Shōyu) soup Chef: Katsumi Yoshioka; Special Ingredient: Black bean soy sauce from Yuasa, Wakayama Prefecture	Ramen with salt (Shio) soup Chef: Shinji Horiuchi; Special Ingredient: Hot spring salt from Kotakara island, Kagoshima Prefecture	Sekiguchi (8-3)
05	2005-05-12	Hiroshima-style okonomiyaki Chef: Sei Mitsuzono (満園聖); Special Ingredient: "Ikitsurugi" dried squid (surume) from Iki, Nagasaki Prefecture	Osaka-style okonomiyaki Chef: Tetsuya Kawamoto; Special Ingredient: Hermes brand tonkatsu sauce from Higashisumiyoshi, Osaka Prefecture	Sekiguchi (9-2)
06	2005-05-19	Gyoza special Chef: Kozo Kawai; Special Ingredient: "Kurogoma Rayu" brand chili pepper sesame oil from Hishikari, Kagoshima	Garlic chives and pork liver stir fry special Chef: Katsumi Yoshioka; Special Ingredient: "Kita no nira" garlic chives from Shiriuchi, Hokkaidō	Sekiguchi (8-3)
07	2005-05-26	Katsudon Chef: Nobukatsu Hashimoto; Special Ingredient: Okida's Black Pork from Okuchi, Kagoshima	Curry rice Chef: Naoki Saito; Special Ingredient: Kanetake Curry powder from Chofu, Tokyo	Sekiguchi (7-4)
08	2005-06-02	Hot dogs Chef: Jun Hida; Special Ingredient: Henjin Mokko sausages from Sado, Niigata	Cheeseburgers Chef: Masato Wakebayashi (分林眞人); Special Ingredient: Caciocavallo cheese from Date, Hokkaidō	Miyake (0-11)
09	2005-06-09	"Gomoku" style Fried rice Chef: Kozo Kawai; Special Ingredient: Charcoal-roasted barbecued pork from Himeji, Hyōgo	Chinese-style donburi Chef: Shinji Horiuchi; Special Ingredient: "Red Diamond" bamboo shoots from Haguro, Yamagata	Sekiguchi (9-2)
10	2005-06-16	Barachirashi (Edomae style chirashizushi) Chef: Kazuki Kondo; Special Ingredient: Wild horse mackerel (shimeaji) from Miyakejima, Tokyo	Hitsumabushi style unagi bowl Chef: Tetsuya Kawamoto; Special Ingredient: Wild eel (iri unagi) from Satsuma, Kagoshima	Miyake (5-6)
11	2005-06-23 King and Queen of Western Cuisine	Hamburg steak Chef: Koichiro Katayama; Special Ingredient: Narui's "Fully-ripe" sweet onions from Sumoto, Hyogo	Deep fried shrimp Chef: Shomei Sakaki (榊 正明); Special Ingredient: Anori U-12 shrimp from Shima, Mie	Sekiguchi (8-3)
12	2005-06-30	Dan dan noodles Chef: Akira Yokota (横田 彰); Special Ingredient: "Taka no tsume (falcon's talon)" chili peppers from Osaka	Hiyashi-chūka Chef: Shinji Horiuchi; Special Ingredient: "Golden" vinegar from Yoronjima, Kagoshima Prefecture	Miyake (5-6)
13	2005-07-14	Maguro medley Dishes: Otoro nigiri sushi, tekkadon, grilled tuna kama (gill meat), otoro teriyaki, negima-jiru tuna and green onion soup Chef: Kouou Sugiura; Special Ingredients: Wild tuna from the Ibiza coast, "Maruiwa" brand wasabi from Izu, Shizuoka	Beef medley Dishes: "Shimofuri (frost)" beef nigiri sushi, tataki style beef, stewed beef tongue, beef sirloin donburi Chef: Tetsuya Kawamoto; Special Ingredients: Fukushima ranch black-hair wagyū beef from Ajisu, Yamaguchi, homemade butter from Kamui, Hokkaidō	Miyake (4-7)
14	2005-07-21	Bulgogi Chef: Shinji Horiuchi; Special Ingredient: Sanchu lettuce from Choshi, Chiba	Genghis Khan barbecue Chef: Naoki Saito; Special Ingredient: "South Down Hoggett" from Shintoku, Hokkaidō	Miyake (4-7)
15	2005-07-28	Gōyā chanpurū Chef: Kozo Kawai; Special Ingredient: "Abashi" bitter melon (gōyā) from Tomigusuku, Okinawa	Pork and kimchi stir fry Chef: Katsumi Yoshioka; Special Ingredient: Yasumoto's kimchi from Kawasaki, Kanagawa	Miyake (2-9)
16	2005-08-04	Fish burger Chef: Koichiro Katayama; Special Ingredient: Perch from Toyoma, Fukushima Prefecture	Bagel sandwiches Chef: Jun Hida; Special Ingredient: "Half and half" rye pumpernickel and spinach bagels from Fujimoto Co., Ota, Tokyo	Sekiguchi (8-3)
17	2005-08-11	Sanuki Udon Chef: Sei Mitsuzono; Special Ingredient: Chikuwa from Kanonji, Kagawa	Morioka Reimen Chef: Akira Yokota; Special Ingredient: Fresh reimen noodles from Morioka, Iwate	Miyake (2-9)
18	2005-08-18	Spaghetti with meat sauce Chef: Tatsumune Nagasaku; Special Ingredient: "Teppen" brand tomatoes from Kōchi, Kōchi	Spaghetti with Neapolitan sauce Chef: Masato Wakebayashi; Special Ingredient: Wiener sausages from Kudamatsu, Yamaguchi	Sekiguchi (7-4)
19	2005-08-25 Festival Showdown	Takoyaki Chef: Ryoji Hamamoto; Special Ingredient: Aji brand octopus from Aji, Kagawa	Yakisoba Chef: Nobuaki Obiki; Special Ingredient: Yakisoba noodles from Musashikoyama, Shinagawa, Tokyo	Miyake (2-9)
20	2005-09-01	Sweet and sour pork Chef: Masaru Nakagawa; Special Ingredient: "Kakuida" brand genmai black vinegar from Fukuyama, Kagoshima	Ebi Chili (Shrimp in chili sauce) Chef: Kin'ya Komoda; Special Ingredient: "Kanoko" brand spiny lobster from Naha, Okinawa	Sekiguchi (8-3)
21	2005-09-15	Beef cutlet Chef: Naoki Saito; Special Ingredient: Sunflower oil from Nanko, Hyogo	Sauteed pork chop Chef: Jun Hida; Special Ingredient: "Wine-ton" brand pork from Enzan, Yamanashi	Sekiguchi (8-3)
22	2005-09-22	Katsuo (Japanese bonito) Chef: Nobukatsu Hashimoto; Special Ingredient: "Modori-katsuo" off the Kesennuma, Miyagi coast	Sanma (Pacific saury) Chef: Sei Mitsuzono; Special Ingredient: "Blue blade (青刀, Seitō)" Pacific saury off the Kushiro, Hokkaidō coast	Sekiguchi (7-4)
23	2005-10-20	Matsutake-infused rice Chef: Hiroyuki Ozawa; Special Ingredient: "Hemlock (米栂, Beitsuga)" matsutake from Mount Fuji	Uni and Ikura donburi Chef: Ryo Sugiura; Special Ingredient: "Ginsei" salmon roe from Erimo, Hokkaidō	Miyake (2-9)
24	2005-10-27	Wontonmen (Wonton Ramen) Special Ingredient: Shiba shrimp of the Toyohama Sea	Chashumen (Roasted Pork Ramen) Special Ingredient: Fuji Aschig Grazing Pig	Sekiguchi (7-2)
25	2005-11-03	Shumai Special Equipment: Chinese Steam Basket	Gyoza Special Equipment: Iron Pot	Miyake (4-5)
26	2005-11-10	Salted Grilled Salmon Special Ingredient: Alaskan King Salmon	Miso Mackerel Special Ingredient: Matsuwa Mackerel	Miyake (4-5)
27	2005-11-17	Hamburger Steak Special Ingredient: Kokiran Eggs	Tonkatsu (Breaded Pork Cutlet) Special Ingredient: Egg Oil	Miyake (4-5)
28	2005-11-24	Kaki-Fry (Panko Fried Oysters) Special Ingredient: Akasaki Toka Oysters	Cream Croquettes Special Ingredient: Raw Milk	Sekiguchi (7-2)
29	2005-12-01	Omu-hayashi (Omelette covered hashed beef) Special Ingredient: King Pearl Champignon Mushrooms	Katsukare (Curried Breaded Pork) Special Ingredient: Raw Milk Yoghurt from Aizu	Miyake (2-7)
30	2005-12-08	Nikuman Special Ingredient: Chinese "Marbled" Cabbage	Curry Buns Special Ingredient: "Cinnanosweet" Cinnamon/Tsugaru apple hybrid	Sekiguchi (6-3)
31	2005-12-15	Salty Chankonabe Stew Special Ingredient: Longtooth Grouper	Kimchi Stew Special Ingredient: Chinese Cabbage Kimchi with fresh shrimp	Sekiguchi (6-3)
32	2006-01-05	Cleopatra Meal Special Ingredient: "Yukireitake" Mushrooms, Hogget	Yang Guifei Meal Special Ingredient: Yacon Root	Miyake (3-8)
33	2006-01-19 Ganryu Duel of Ramen	Musashi Noodle Shop Ramen Special Ingredient: Salt, Miso, Soy Combo	Nakamura Ramen Special Ingredient: Ise Shrimp	Sekiguchi (5-4)
34	2006-01-26 500¥ Bowl Renaissance 2006	Mamoru Kataoka's Italian Style Ebichiri Bowl (Shrimp in chili sauce) Special Ingredient: Solleone Tomatoes, Kuruma Prawns	Hikoaki Tan's Chinese Style Katsukare Bowl (Curried Breaded Pork) Special Ingredient: "Saiboku Golden Pork"	Miyake (2-7)
35	2006-02-02 Calorie Cutting:	Beef Curry Special Ingredient: Urausu "North Farm Stock Mini Tomato Bottle" (Juice)	Sauce Fried Rice Special Ingredient: Iwate dried shiitake mushrooms	Miyake (4-5)
36	2006-02-09 Valentine Sweets Wars	Chef Toshi Yoroizuka's "Salon de Dessert" Special Ingredient: Nacional "Arriba" Cocoa from Ecuador	Chef Koichi Izumi's "Salon de The Cerisier" Special Ingredient: Four Chocolates: Legato, Fortissima, Maracaibo, Callebaut W2	Sekiguchi (6-3)
37	2006-02-16	Oden Special Ingredient: Nihonbashi Kanmo Hanpen (Fish Cakes)	Yakiton (Grilled Pork Skewers) Special Ingredient: Taiki Apple Grassland Pork	Sekiguchi (6-3)
38	2006-02-23 Legends of Entertainment	Yuichi Kimura Special Celebrity Guest Chef	Eiji Bando Special Celebrity Guest Chef	Miyake (3-6)
39	2006-03-09	Ginger Pork Meal Special Ingredient: Suminoi Shuzo 10 y.o. Mirin, Okita Kurobuta black pork, Hachiro ginger	Sautéed Pork Liver Meal Special Ingredient: Super Golden Pork Liver	Sekiguchi (8-1)
40	2006-03-16	Hakata Gourmet Special Ingredient: ?	Nagoya Gourmet Special Ingredient: Rare Handmade Miso	Sekiguchi (7-2)
41	2006-03-30 Three-way Ganryu Duel of Ramen	Musashi Noodles "Three Kingdoms" Ramen Chef Morisumi's Chabuya Noodles Chef Furuya's Nanetsutei Noodles	Special Ingredient: Yoronjima Salt Special Ingredient: Mongolian Rock Salt, Arita Bowl Special Ingredient: Wakinosawa Wild Boar	Koji Higashino (6-3-5)
42	2006-04-13 500¥ Rice Bowl Grand Prix	Chef Hiromi Yamada of "Ristorante HiRo" (Pork Dumpling Bowl) Special Celebrity Guest Chef	Chef Toshio Tanabe of "Ne Quittez pas" (Grilled Hamaguri Don) Special Celebrity Guest Chef	Miyake (2-9)
43	2006-04-20 Brain Rejuvenating Battle	Japanese Meal Special Ingredient: Canned Sardines	Western Meal Special Ingredient: Whole Grain Pasta	Sekiguchi (7-2)
44	2006-04-27 Good Old Reliables	Nostalgic "Chuka-Soba" Ramen Special Ingredient: Chashu, menma, spinach, onion, seaweed	Memories of Rice Curry Special Ingredient: Pork, Potatoes, carrots, onion, C&B Curry	Miyake (4-5)
45	2006-05-04 Legends of Entertainment 2	Tomio Umezawa's Chinjao Rosu (Beef Bamboo Stir Fry) Special Ingredient: Fukuoka Kinmei Moso Bamboo Shoots	Hiroyuki Amano Special Ingredient: Tokyo Udo (Aralia Cordata) from Tachikawa	Sekiguchi (5-4)
46	2006-05-11 Ganryu Duel of Ramen Chaos Unification	Kudan Ikaruga Restaurant's "Brand New Tokyo Soy Sauce Ramen" Special Ingredient: Yamashin White Soy Sauce from Hekinan	Setagaya Restaurant's "Ramen Zero" Special Ingredient: Akkeshi Clams	Miyake (2-7)
47	2006-05-18 500¥ Rice Bowl Grand Prix 2	Restaurant Omiya's Cream Croquette Bowl Special Celebrity Guest Chef: Katsuo Omiya	Szechwan Restaurant's Chinese Chili Chicken Bowl Special Celebrity Guest Chef: Kinya Komoda	Miyake (4-5)
48	2006-05-25	Gyoza Special Ingredient: "Yakuzen" Medicinal Chili Oil from the Ogasawara Islands	Kushikatsu (Deep Fried Skewers) Special Ingredient: "Wandafuru" Sauce from Amagasaki	Miyake (0-9)
49	2006-06-01	Korean Gourmet Special Ingredient: "Nakagen" Chinese Cabbage Kimchi from Nagoya	Vietnamese Gourmet Special Ingredient: Cilantro Leaves from Yachimata	Sekiguchi (5-4)
50	2006-06-08	Hokkaido Gourmet Special Ingredient: "Red Bokke" Okhotsk Atka Mackerel	Okinawa Gourmet Special Ingredient: Nakajin Agoo Pork	Miyake (1-8)
51	2006-06-15	Seafood Curry Special Ingredient: Atyidae Shrimp from Kii	Eggplant and Ground Beef Curry Special Ingredient: Large "Tamage-Nasu" Eggplant from Hagi.	Miyake (4-5)
52	2006-06-22 Ganryu Dual Duel of Ramen & Sweets pt 1	Nantsuttei Restaurant's Salt Tonkotsu Ramen Special Ingredient: Jumbo Notsuke Scallops	Setagaya Restaurant's Soy Sauce Tonkotsu Ramen "K.O." Special Ingredient: Tokobushi Abalone from Muroto	Sekiguchi (7-4)
53	2006-06-22 Ganryu Dual Duel of Ramen & Sweets pt 2	Toshi Yoroizuka's duo of Parfait and Ice Cream Special Ingredient: Watermelon from Ueki	Ecole Criollo Bakery's Japanese Cherry Ice Cream Special Ingredient: "Gion Koishi" Shaved Ice with "Kokuto" brown sugar from Okinawa	Miyake (5-6)
54	2006-07-06 Kings of Earth: Ocean vs Land!	Spicy Negitoro Bowl with Broiled Fatty Tuna Special Ingredient: Kawaminami wild bluefin tuna	Tenderized Beef Bowl with Consommé Special Ingredient: Beef from the Furutake Farm in Imari	Miyake (2-7)
55	2006-07-13	Tendon (Fried Fish Bowl) Special Ingredient: Bigfin Reef Squid from Shishi Island in Kagoshima	Kaisendon (Raw Seafood Bowl) Special Ingredient: Caridean Shrimp from Ishinomaki	Miyake (2-9)
56	2006-07-20 Special Selection of Summer Ingredients	1st - Kawagoe - Ono Shokuhin's "Zaru Tofu" 2nd - Iwaki - Yamaben's "Phantom" Soy Sauce 3rd - Himeji - Charcoal Roast Pork 4th - Ishigaki - Irwin Mango 5th - Wajima - Dried Nodoguro	6th - Sado Island - "Henjin Mokko" Sausage 7th - Kyoto - Shirakawa Bakery Shokupan (milk bread) 8th - Fukuroi - "Crown" MuskMelon 9th - Urausu - Mini Tomato Bottle 10th - Hara - Canadian Smoked Salmon	
57	2006-07-27 Ganryu Duel of Ramen: Local Warlords!	Raimon Restaurant's chicken ramen in white broth Special Ingredient: chishimazasa (sasa kurilensis bamboo shoots) from Yakumo	Mengekijou Genei Restaurant's Hakata-style Soy Sauce Ramen Special Ingredient: Dried tobiuo (flying fish) from Hirado	Miyake (4-5)
58	2006-08-07	Hiroshima okonomiyaki Special Ingredient: Hakodate's Shredded Gagome Kombu	Osaka Okonomiyaki Special Ingredient: Shitenno-ji's Beni shoga, Sei Agri mayonnaise	Sekiguchi (9-0)
59	2006-08-10	Hitsumabushi (Nagoya Eel Bowl) Special Ingredient: Lake Hinuma Wild Eel, Hida Sansho's Pepper Powder (Gifu)	Stone Grilled Yukhoe Bibimbap Special Ingredient: Nishiwaga Japanese Royal Fern, Yamaguchi Honpo's Black Sesame Oil	Sekiguchi (7-2)
60	2006-08-17	Sanratanmen (Hot and Sour Ramen) Special Ingredient: Oyama Shokuhin Brown Rice Black Vinegar From Aya	Curry Soup Special Ingredient: New potatoes and "ponta" asparagus from Kimura Farm in Mori	Miyake (4-5)
61	2006-08-24	Uni Special Ingredient: Yura Red Sea Urchin from Awaji Island	Abalone Special Ingredient: Black Abalone from Shirahama	Sekiguchi (7-2)
62	2006-08-31	Mugitoro (Rice cooked with pressed barley) Special Ingredient: "Kaga Maru" Mountain Yams from Nomi	Somen Special Ingredient: Somen from "Miwa Yamakatsu" in Sakurai	Miyake (2-7)
63	2006-09-07	Hayashi Rice Special Ingredient: "Super Jumbo Mushroom" (15 cm) from Funagata	Omurice Special Ingredient: "Sicilian Rouge" Tomatoes from Hitachinaka	Sekiguchi (8-1)
64	2006-09-14 Final Round	Oyakodon Special Ingredient: Gonohe Shamorokku Chicken, "Mizunasu" Eggplant Nukazuke from Iseya, Kuromon Market, Osaka	Katsudon Special Ingredient: "Abel" Black Pig from Mijakonojo, "Ise" Takuan from Hayashi Store in Ise	Sekiguchi (9-0)
