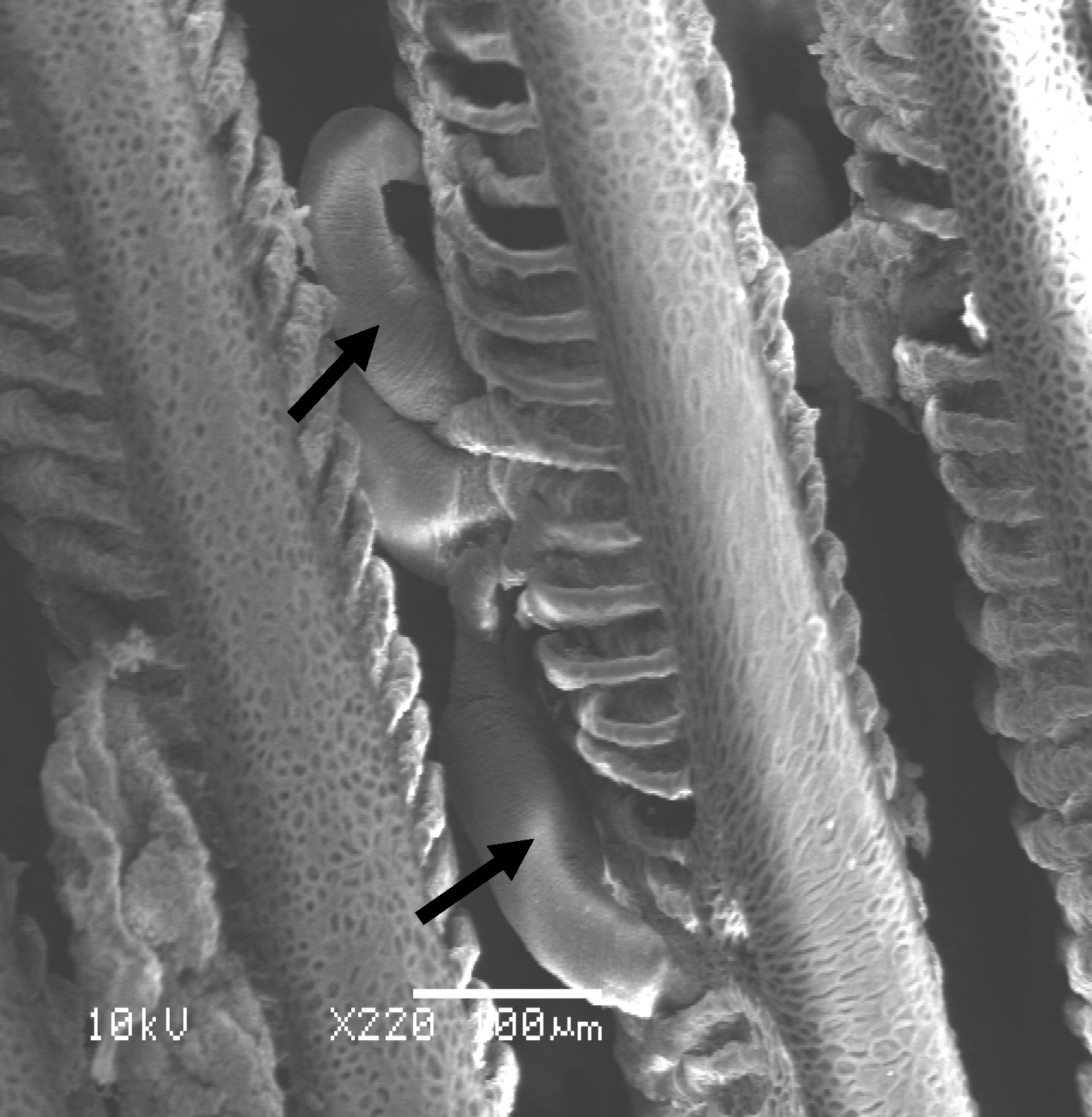
- Pseudorhabdosynochus lantauensis on the gills of its host-fish

Scientific classification
- Kingdom: Animalia
- Phylum: Platyhelminthes
- Class: Monogenea
- Order: Dactylogyridea
- Family: Diplectanidae
- Genus: Pseudorhabdosynochus
- Species: P. lantauensis

Binomial name
- Pseudorhabdosynochus lantauensis (Beverley-Burton & Suriano, 1981)

= Pseudorhabdosynochus lantauensis =

Species of flatworm

Pseudorhabdosynochus lantauensis is a diplectanid monogenean parasitic on the gills of the longtooth grouper, Epinephelus bruneus. It was described in 1981 as Cycloplectanum lantauensis and later transferred to the genus Pseudorhabdosynochus by Kritsky & Beverley-Burton in 1986.

== Description ==
Pseudorhabdosynochus lantauensis is a small monogenean. The species has the general characteristics of other species of Pseudorhabdosynochus, with a flat body and a posterior haptor, which is the organ by which the monogenean attaches itself to the gill of is host. The haptor bears two squamodiscs, one ventral and one dorsal. The sclerotized male copulatory organ, or "quadriloculate organ", has the shape of a bean with four internal chambers, as in other species of Pseudorhabdosynochus. The vagina includes a sclerotized part, which is a complex structure.

== Hosts and localities ==
The type-host is the longtooth grouper, Epinephelus bruneus and the type-locality is near Hong-Kong. Other host fish species, such as the orange-spotted grouper Epinephelus coioides have been mentioned.

== Life cycle ==
The life-cycle of Pseudorhabdosynochus lantauensis has been described, as a parasite of the orange-spotted grouper Epinephelus coioides, at a temperature of 30 °C. The adult lays 10-22 eggs/day. The eggs hatch within 2–4 days. The free-living and swimming larva, the oncomiracidium, is viable for 4-8 h and should find a host within this delay. After attachment, the oncomiracidium transforms into an adult in 4–7 days. The parasite produces eggs after 7 days. The life-cycle is thus complete in 13–20 days (at 30 °C).
