= Isa, Kagoshima =

Isa 伊佐市
- City
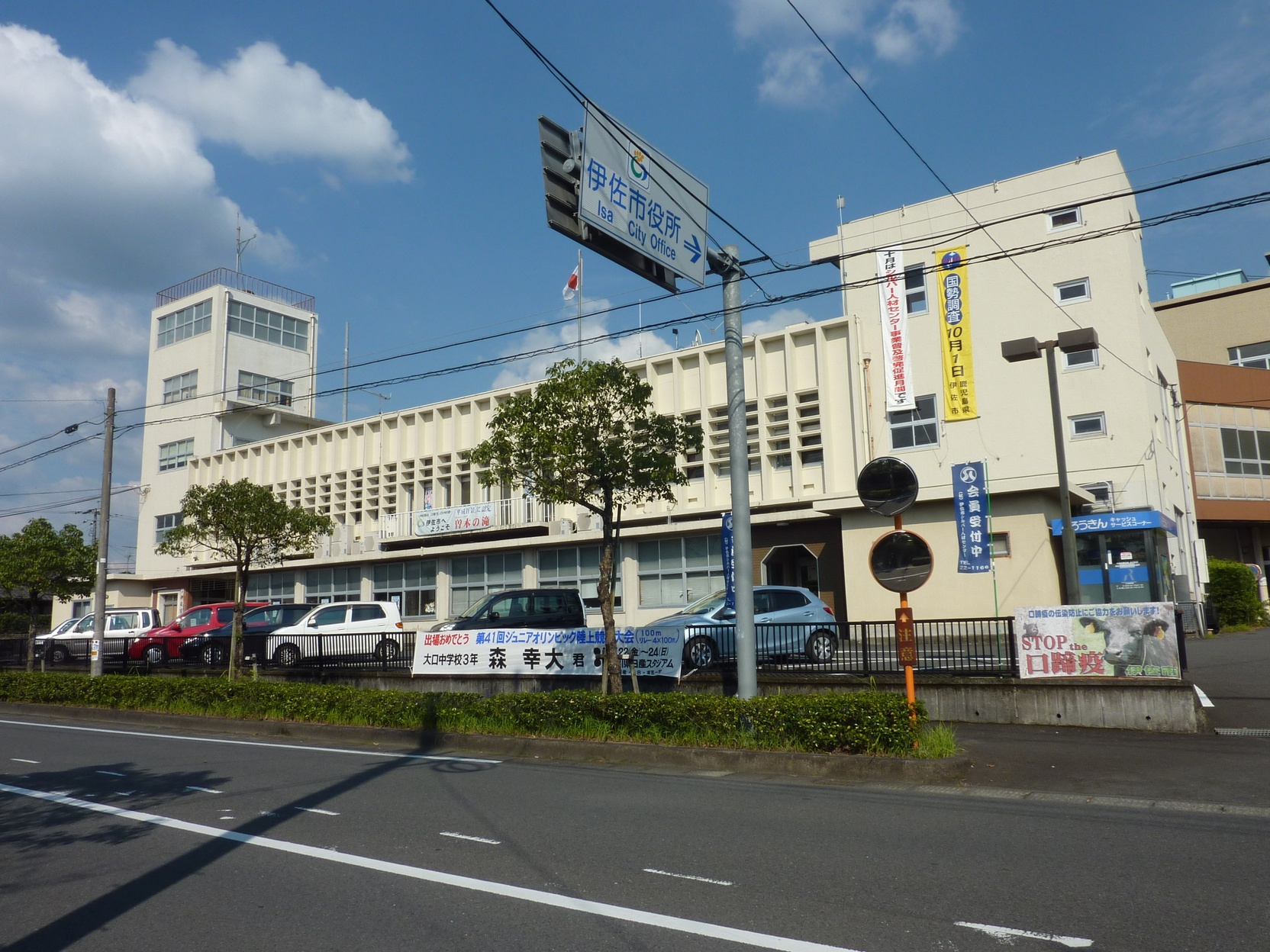
- Isa City Hall

- Flag Emblem
- Interactive map of Isa
- Location in Japan
- Coordinates: 32°3′25″N 130°36′47″E
- Country: Japan
- Region: Kyushu
- Prefecture: Kagoshima

Government
  - Mayor: Kinya Hashimoto (since November 2020)

Area
  - Total: 392.56 km^{2} (151.57 sq mi)

Population (July 1, 2024)
  - Total: 22,998
  - Density: 58.585/km^{2} (151.73/sq mi)
- Time zone: UTC+09:00 (JST)
- City hall address: Okuchi-sato 1888, Isa-shi, Kagoshima-ken 895-2511
- Climate: Cfa
- Website: Official website
- Symbols
- Flower: Cherry blossom
- Tree: Chamaecyparis obtusa

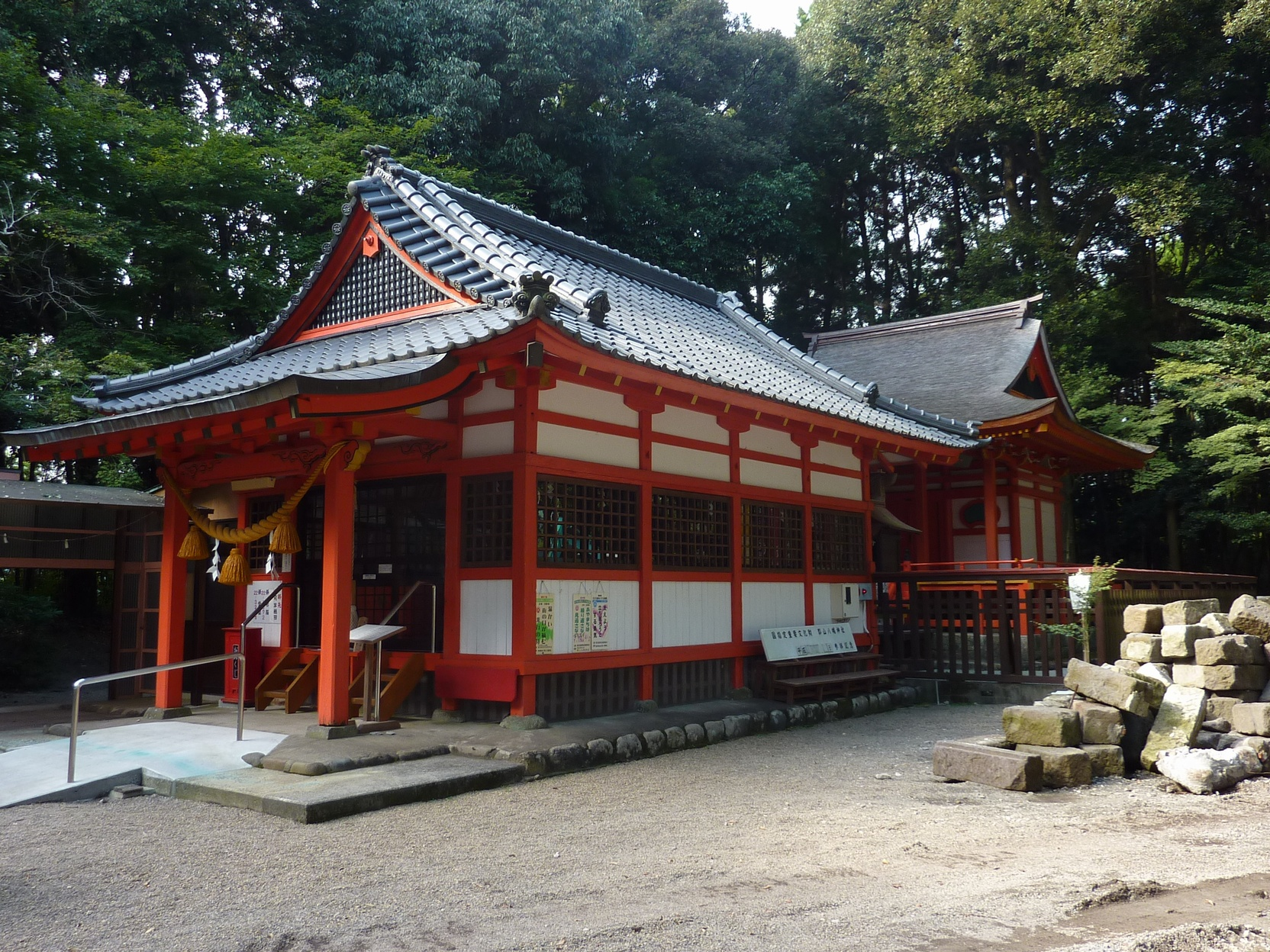
Koriyama Hachiman Shrine

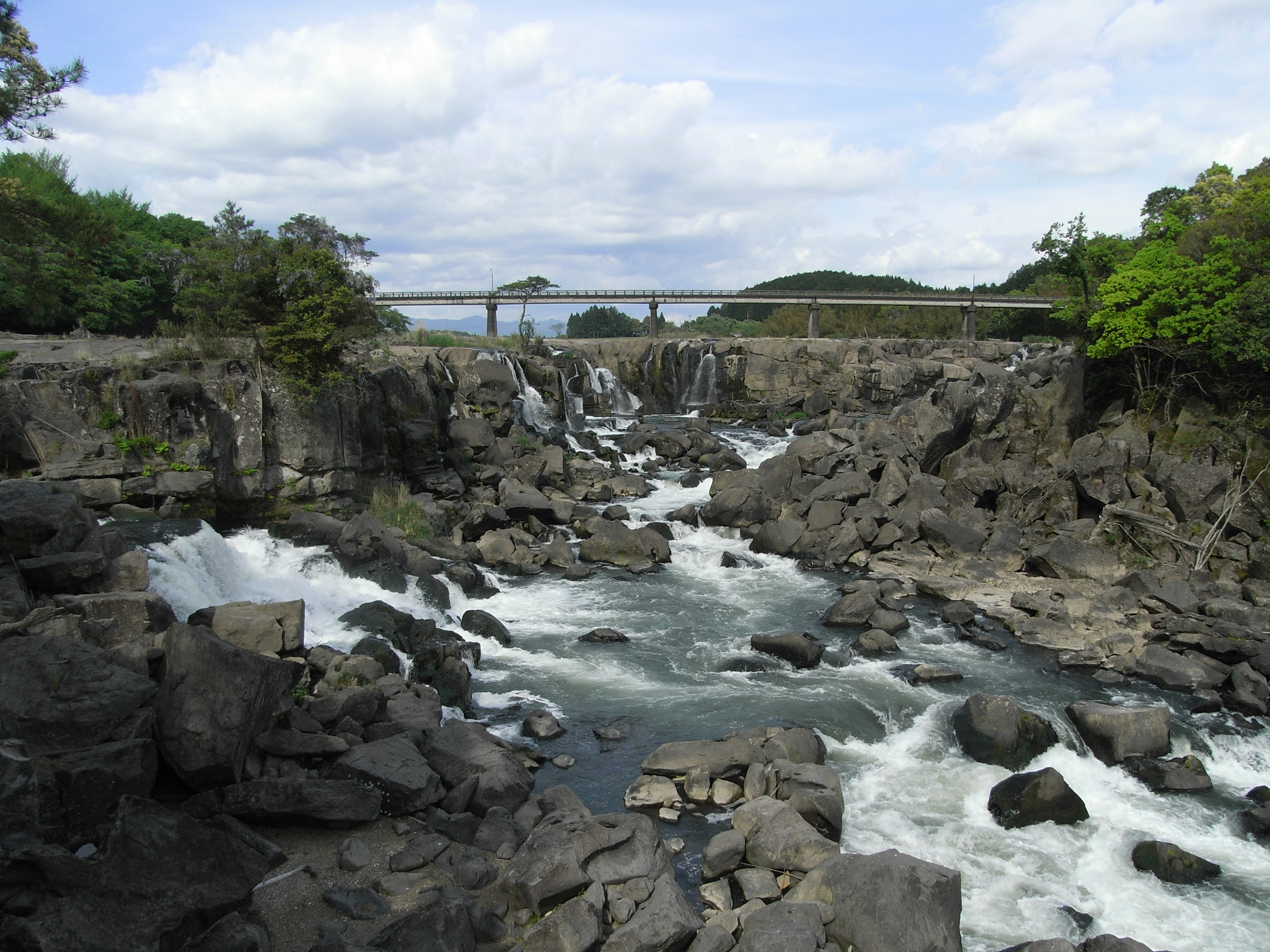
Sogi Falls in Isa

Isa (伊佐市, Isa-shi; Japanese pronunciation: [í.sä̀, ì.sä́.ɕì]) is a city located in Kagoshima Prefecture, Japan. As of 1 July 2024, the city had an estimated population of 22,998 in 12567 households, and a population density of 59 persons per km^{2}. The total area of the city is 392.56 km^{2} (151.57 sq mi).

== Geography ==
Isa is located in the northernmost inland area of Kagoshima Prefecture, about 75 kilometers north of the prefectural capital, Kagoshima City. The Kawauchi River runs through the city, which is surrounded by the Kyushu Mountains, and the urban center is part of the Oguchi Basin, with an elevation of about 180 meters.

=== Neighboring municipalities ===
Kagoshima Prefecture

- Izumi
- Satsuma
- Yūsui

Kumamoto Prefecture

- Hitoyoshi
- Kuma
- Minamata

Miyazaki Prefecture

- Ebino

=== Climate ===
Isa has a humid subtropical climate (Köppen climate classification Cfa) with hot summers and mild winters. Precipitation is significant throughout the year, and is heavier in summer, especially the months of June and July. The average annual temperature in Isa is 15.6 °C (60.1 °F). The average annual rainfall is 2,799.8 mm (110.23 in) with June as the wettest month. The temperatures are highest on average in August, at around 26.3 °C (79.3 °F), and lowest in January, at around 4.6 °C (40.3 °F). The city recorded −15.2 °C (4.6 °F) on January 25, 2016 which is the lowest temperature ever recorded of Lowlands in Kyushu, while the extreme maximum temperature was 38.3 °C (100.9 °F) on 27 July 2026.

Climate data for Ōkuchi, Isa (1991−2020 normals, extremes 1977−present)
Month	Jan	Feb	Mar	Apr	May	Jun	Jul	Aug	Sep	Oct	Nov	Dec	Year
Record high °C (°F)	22.1 (71.8)	23.4 (74.1)	26.3 (79.3)	30.1 (86.2)	34.0 (93.2)	34.2 (93.6)	38.3 (100.9)	37.6 (99.7)	36.4 (97.5)	32.8 (91.0)	28.2 (82.8)	24.0 (75.2)	38.3 (100.9)
Mean daily maximum °C (°F)	10.6 (51.1)	12.3 (54.1)	15.9 (60.6)	20.9 (69.6)	25.3 (77.5)	27.2 (81.0)	31.1 (88.0)	32.0 (89.6)	29.4 (84.9)	24.7 (76.5)	18.9 (66.0)	13.0 (55.4)	21.8 (71.2)
Daily mean °C (°F)	4.6 (40.3)	6.0 (42.8)	9.5 (49.1)	14.2 (57.6)	18.7 (65.7)	22.2 (72.0)	26.0 (78.8)	26.3 (79.3)	23.4 (74.1)	17.8 (64.0)	11.9 (53.4)	6.4 (43.5)	15.6 (60.1)
Mean daily minimum °C (°F)	−1.0 (30.2)	0.1 (32.2)	3.3 (37.9)	7.7 (45.9)	12.7 (54.9)	18.2 (64.8)	22.2 (72.0)	22.4 (72.3)	18.9 (66.0)	12.1 (53.8)	5.9 (42.6)	0.7 (33.3)	10.3 (50.5)
Record low °C (°F)	−15.2 (4.6)	−10.2 (13.6)	−7.7 (18.1)	−4.2 (24.4)	2.0 (35.6)	6.8 (44.2)	14.4 (57.9)	15.2 (59.4)	6.2 (43.2)	−1.0 (30.2)	−4.5 (23.9)	−8.7 (16.3)	−15.2 (4.6)
Average precipitation mm (inches)	77.4 (3.05)	123.0 (4.84)	169.9 (6.69)	200.7 (7.90)	236.6 (9.31)	625.8 (24.64)	538.4 (21.20)	275.0 (10.83)	257.7 (10.15)	101.0 (3.98)	101.9 (4.01)	92.4 (3.64)	2,799.8 (110.23)
Average precipitation days (≥ 1.0 mm)	8.6	9.6	12.2	10.9	10.4	16.7	14.7	13.3	11.4	7.4	8.7	8.7	132.6
Mean monthly sunshine hours	135.5	139.8	165.6	176.3	178.3	105.2	158.5	182.8	161.2	178.1	151.9	138.2	1,872.7
Source: Japan Meteorological Agency

== Demographics ==
Per Japanese census data, the population of Isa in 2020 is 24,453 people. Isa's population peaked in the 1950s and has been steadily declining since then until 2020.

Historical population

Year	Pop.	±%
1920	37,437	—
1925	39,227	+4.8%
1930	42,281	+7.8%
1935	43,779	+3.5%
1940	44,880	+2.5%
1945	60,798	+35.5%
1950	61,082	+0.5%
1955	60,145	−1.5%
1960	56,404	−6.2%
1965	49,405	−12.4%
1970	42,905	−13.2%

Year	Pop.	±%
1975	39,343	−8.3%
1980	38,310	−2.6%
1985	37,483	−2.2%
1990	36,146	−3.6%
1995	35,007	−3.2%
2000	33,508	−4.3%
2005	31,499	−6.0%
2010	29,311	−6.9%
2015	26,810	−8.5%
2020	24,453	−8.8%

== History ==
Isa is part of ancient Satsuma Province and was part of the holdings of Satsuma Domain in the Edo period. On April 1, 1889, the villages of Oguchi, Yamano, and Hazuki were established with the creation of the modern municipalities system. Oguchi was raised to town status in 1918, followed by Yamano in 1940. In 1954, Oguchi, Yamano, Hazuki, and Nishitara village in Isa District were merged to form the city of Oguchi. Likewise, the villages of Hishikari and Tara were established on April 1, 1889 with the creation of the modern municipalities system. In 1891, Tara was divided into Higashitara and Nishitara, and in 1925 Higashitara was renamed Honjo. In 1940, Hishikari was raised to town status, and in 1954, Hishikari annexed Honjo. The city of Isa was created on November 1, 2008, from the merger of the city of Ōkuchi, and the town of Hishikari (from Isa District). Isa District was dissolved as a result of this merger.

== Government ==
Isa has a mayor-council form of government with a directly elected mayor and a unicameral city council of 16 members. Isa contributes one member to the Kagoshima Prefectural Assembly. In terms of national politics, the city is part of the Kagoshima 3rd district of the lower house of the Diet of Japan.

== Economy ==
The main economy activity of Isa is agriculture. Notable local products include rice, sweet potatoes and the production shōchū. The Hishikari mine is one of the few operational mines in Japan, and produces gold.

== Education ==
Izumi has 13 public elementary schools, six public junior high schools and one public high school by the city government, and three public high schools operated by the Kagoshima Prefectural Board of Education. There is also one private high school (Izumi Chuo High School). The prefecture also operates a special education school for the handicapped.

== Transportation ==
=== Railways ===
Isa has no passenger railway service. The nearest stations are Kurino Station in Yusui or Shin-Minamata Station in Minamata.

=== Highways ===
- National Route 267
- National Route 268
- National Route 328
- National Route 447

== Sister cities ==
- Namhae County, South Gyeongsang, South Korea, since 1991

== Noted people from Isa ==
- Takaaki Enoki, actor
- Takehiko Inoue, manga artist
