= Chōgorō Kaionji =

Japanese writer

Kaionji Chōgorō
- 海音寺 潮五郎
- Chōgorō Kaionji
- Born: 5 November 1901; Okuchi, Kagoshima, Japan
- Died: 1 December 1977 (aged 76); Kuroiso, Tochigi, Japan
- Resting place: Tsukiji Hongan-ji Tokyo, Japan
- Education: Kokugakuin University
- Occupation: Writer
- Writing career
- Language: Japanese
- Genre: Popular novels
- Notable awards: Naoki Prize (1936); Kikuchi Kan Prize (1968); Person of Cultural Merit (1973)

Tōsaku Suetomi (末富 東作, Suetomi Tōsaku), known by his pen name Chōgorō Kaionji (海音寺 潮五郎, Kaionji Chōgorō), was a Japanese author. Noted for his historical novels, he was active during the Shōwa era of Japan.

== Early life ==
Chōgorō was born in present-day Okuchi city Kagoshima Prefecture. He was a voracious reader as a youth, and although it was forbidden to read books on school grounds outside of the classroom, he would sneak books out of the library and read in secret on the school roof. He entered the Kogakkan University in Ise, Mie in 1921, but returned home in 1922 to get married. In 1923, he went to Tokyo, where he enrolled in the Kokugakuin University. On graduation in 1926, he initially returned to Kagoshima as a high school teacher of Japanese and Chinese literature. However, after two years, he relocated to Kyoto in a similar position.

== Literary career ==
Chōgorō began writing fiction while teaching at a junior high school, at first in his native Kagoshima, and later in Kyoto. His early novel Utakata Zoshi (Transient Notes) won prizes a contest run by the Mainichi Shimbun weekly magazine, Sunday Mainichi in 1929, and he repeated this feat in 1932 with his second novel Fuun (Wind and Clouds).

Kaionji moved to Kamakura, Kanagawa prefecture from Kyoto in 1934, when he made a resolution to pursue a career as a professional writer. He won the prestigious Naoki Prize in 1936 with Tensho Onna Gassen (Tenshō Women's Battle), about the life of the tea master Sen no Rikyū and his daughter Ogin. He followed this with Budō Denraiki (Samurai Chronicles) and other works with a similar medieval warrior theme, which were serialized in newspapers. However, his Yanagisawa Sōdō (Yanagisawa Disturbance) serialized in the Sunday Mainichi drew the wrath of the censors in the Home Ministry, and its publication was suspended by government order in 1938.

With the start of the Pacific War, he was drafted into the Imperial Japanese Army in 1941, and served for a year in Malaya. Life in the army did not agree with him, and he returned to Japan in 1942 on medical leave, which he managed to stretch out for the next three years until the end of the war.

In the postwar years, he completed epic historical novels such as Moko Kitaru (Mongol Attack), Taira no Masakado and Ten to Chi to (Heaven and Earth, 1960–1962), which formed the basis of some equally epic movies. He won the 16th Kikuchi Kan Prize in 1968, and was made a member of the review committee for the Naoki Prize in 1970.

In 1973, he was designated a Person of Cultural Merit by the Japanese government. He won the Academy of Arts Prize in 1976.

While writing TV dramas on the side, he contributed to the field of historical/biographical novels with Busho Retsuden ("Biographies of Warriors") and Akunin Retsuden ("Biographies of Villains"). He considered his life's work to be a biography of Saigō Takamori, which he failed to complete due to his death by a cerebral hemorrhage in 1977.

His grave is at the Tsukiji Hongan-ji in Tokyo.

== See also ==
- Japanese literature
- List of Japanese writers
