= Share House =

- Directed by: Ichirō Kita
- Screenplay by: Ichirō Kita
- Starring: Kazuko Yoshiyuki; Megumi Saeki; Miyoko Asada; Hana Kino; Tetsuya Makita
- Release date: November 12, 2011 (Japan)
- Running time: 104 minutes
- Country: Japan
- Language: Japanese

Share House (シェアハウス, Shea Hausu) is a 2011 Japanese drama film directed by Ichirō Kita.

== Cast ==
- ccc Kazuko Yoshiyuki
- Megumi Saeki
- Miyoko Asada
- Hana Kino
- Takaaki Enoki
- Tetsuya Makita
