= Hishikari, Kagoshima =

Former town in Isa district, Kagoshima prefecture, Japan

Coordinates: 31°59′57″N 130°39′24″E

Hishikari (菱刈町, Hishikari-chō) was a town located in Isa District, Kagoshima Prefecture, Japan.

As of April 2007, the town had a population of 9,603 and the density of 96.54 persons per km^{2}. The total area was 100.47 km^{2}.

On November 1, 2008, Hishikari was merged with the city of Ōkuchi to create the city of Isa. Isa District was dissolved as a result of this merger.

Hishikari mine is the largest gold mine in Japan.
