= Takaaki Enoki =

Japanese actor and artist (born 1956)

- 榎木 孝明
- Born: January 5, 1956 (age 70); Isa District, Kagoshima, Japan
- Education: Musashino Art University
- Occupations: Actor, artist
- Years active: 1978–present
- Agent: Office Taka
- Spouse: Terue Suzuki
- Website: www.officetaka.co.jp

Takaaki Enoki (榎木 孝明, Enoki Takaaki; born January 5, 1956) is a Japanese actor and artist from Isa District, Kagoshima. He is known for his role as private detective Mitsuhiko Asami in the Asami Mitsuhiko Series. He attended Musashino Art University but left before graduating and joined the Shiki Theatre Company. In 1990, Enoki landed the lead role in Heaven and Earth in place of Ken Watanabe, who had to pull out due to illness.

He is also known as an ink painter and his museum opened in 2003.(Located in Kokonoe, Ōita.)

== Filmography ==
=== Film ===
- Lost Chapter of Snow: Passion (1985)
- Heaven and Earth (1990), Uesugi Kenshin
- Best Guy (1990), Tetsuo "Apollo" Kajitani
- Tenkawa Densetsu Satsujinjiken (1991), Asami Mitsuhiko
- Bloom in the Moonlight (1991), Tōson Shimazaki
- Toki o Kakeru Shōjo (1997)
- Sleeping Bride (2000)
- Merdeka 17805 (2001)
- Koinu Dan no Monogatari (2002), Yoshitaka Morishita
- Spy Sorge (2003), Duke Fumimaro Konoye
- The Wind Carpet (2003)
- Spring Snow (2005)
- Genghis Khan: To the Ends of the Earth and Sea (2007)
- Kaidan (2007)
- Share House (2011)
- Genji Monogatari: Sennen no Nazo (2011)
- Teiichi: Battle of Supreme High (2017), The prime minister
- Mio's Cookbook (2020)
- Nobutora (2021), Uesugi Kenshin
- Signature (2022), Usuke Asai
- Shimamori (2022)
- Oshorin (2023)
- Salary Man Kintaro (2025), Morinosuke Yamato
- Salary Man Kintaro 2 (2025), Morinosuke Yamato
- Senkaku 1945 (2027), Iramina

=== Television ===
- Sanada Taiheiki (1985), Higuchi Kakubei
- Dokuganryū Masamune (1987), Ōno Harunaga
- Taiheiki (1991), Hino Toshimoto
- Wataru Seken wa Oni Bakari (xxxx), Hisamitsu Aoyama
- Asami Mitsuhiko Series (1995-2006), Mitsuhiko Asami / Yōichirō Asami
- Kōmyō ga Tsuji (2006), Azai Nagamasa
- Atsuhime (2008), Kimotsuki Kaneyoshi
- Clouds Over the Hill (2009), Mori Rintaro
- No Dropping Out: Back to School at 35 (2013), Yoshio Noda
- Yae's Sakura (2013), Ii Naosuke
- Awaiting Kirin (2020), Yamazaki Ieyoshi
- Unbound (2025), Tokugawa Munechika
- Last Samurai Standing (2025)
- Shōgun season 2 (TBA), Ito
- Brothers in Arms (2026), Azai Hisamasa

== Awards ==
| Year | Award | Category | Work(s) | Result | Ref |
|---|---|---|---|---|---|
| 1985 | 9th Elan d'or Awards | Newcomer of the Year | Himself | Won | |
