= Heaven and Earth (1990 film) =

Heaven and Earth Ten to Chi to
- DVD Cover
- Directed by: Haruki Kadokawa
- Screenplay by: Haruki Kadokawa; Toshio Kamata; Isao Yoshiwara
- Based on: Ten to Chi to by Chōgorō Kaionji
- Produced by: Yutaka Okada
- Starring: Takaaki Enoki; Masahiko Tsugawa; Atsuko Asano; Naomi Zaizen; Hironobu Nomura
- Narrated by: Tomomichi Nishimura
- Cinematography: Yonezō Maeda
- Edited by: Akira Suzuki
- Music by: Daisuke Hinata; Tetsuya Komuro
- Production companies: Kadokawa Haruki Corporation; Nippon Television; TBS
- Distributed by: Toei Company
- Release date: 23 June 1990 (Japan)
- Running time: 104 minutes
- Country: Japan
- Languages: Japanese; English
- Budget: ¥5 billion ($40 million)
- Box office: ¥9.2 billion (Japan) $307,775 (United States)

Heaven and Earth (Japanese: 天と地と, Hepburn: Ten to Chi to) is a 1990 Japanese epic jidaigeki film directed by Haruki Kadokawa, based on a novel by Chōgorō Kaionji. The film stars Takaaki Enoki, Tsugawa Masahiko, Asano Atsuko, Zaizen Naomi and Nomura Hironobu. It was released on 23 June 1990, in Japan, and an English version was released in North America in 1991.

Ken Watanabe was originally cast in the role of Kenshin, but had to pull out after being diagnosed with acute myeloid leukemia.

== Plot ==
Set in feudal Japan, the story begins as the daimyō Kagetora (also known as Uesugi Kenshin) obtains power from the shogun to rule the province of Echigo. However, he must protect his lands and his people from the ambitions of the warlord Takeda Shingen, the daimyo of Kai Province who has just invaded and taken control of Shinano. From the beginning, the Takeda army appears to be stronger, but due to Kagetora’s tactics, he manages to win a few minor battles and kill Nobushige, Shingen’s brother, and Kansuke, one of Shingen’s trusted men.

After years of conflict, Takeda and Kagetora finally face each other in a duel. Kagetora injures Takeda, while his forces ultimately defeat Takeda's army at the Battle of Kawanakajima in October 1561.

== Cast ==
- Takaaki Enoki as Uesugi Kenshin
- Masahiko Tsugawa as Takeda Shingen
- Atsuko Asano as Nami
- Naomi Zaizen as Yae
- Hironobu Nomura as Takeda "Tarō" Yoshinobu
- Taro Ishida as Takeda Nobushige
- Binpachi Itō as Kakizaki Kageie
- Akira Hamada as Naoe Kagetsuna
- Hiroyuki Okita as Kōsaka Danjō
- Hideo Murota as Obu Toramasa
- Isao Natsuyagi as Yamamoto Kansuke
- Tsunehiko Watase as Usami Sadayuki
- Morio Kazama
- Masatō Ibu
- Kyōko Kishida
- Hideji Ōtaki
- Tomomichi Nishimura as Narrator

== Production ==
Heaven and Earth was the most expensive Japanese production ever made at the time, with a budget of $40 million. The film was shot largely in Canada. It was in production for a year, and featured 1,000 horses and 3,000 extras.

The shooting in Canada took place just outside of Banff, Alberta, in an area known as Morley Flats.

== Reception ==
In Japan, Heaven and Earth sold 4.8 million tickets prior to its release. The film opened on 23 June 1990 on 215 screens and grossed $8.4 million in its opening weekend, one of the largest openings ever in Japan at that time. It became the number-one Japanese film in the domestic market for 1990, earning ¥5.05 billion in distributor rental income and ¥9.2 billion in gross receipts. In the United States, the film grossed $307,775.

According to movie critic and historian Leonard Maltin, the picture is "Physically-impressive...won't make you forget Kagemusha, but delivers the goods for those who enjoy large-scale battle scenes."
