= Isa District, Kagoshima =

Former district in Kagoshima prefecture, Japan

Coordinates: 32°03′26″N 130°36′47″E

List of Provinces of Japan > Saikaido > Satsuma Province > Isa District

Japan > Kyūshū > Kagoshima Prefecture > Isa District

Isa (伊佐郡, Isa-gun) was a district located in Kagoshima Prefecture, Japan.

As of October 1, 2008, the district had a population of 8,952 with an area of 100.47 km^{2}.

The district's area is equivalent to the current city of Isa.

Until the day before the dissolution, the district had one town:

- Hishikari (菱刈町)

== Timeline ==
- March 29, 1896 - Isa District was formed when Kitaisa and Hishikari Districts were merged. The villages of Ōkuchi, Yamano, Hatsuki, Hishikari, Nishitara and Higashitara were formed.
- April 1, 1918 - The village of Ōkuchi was elevated to town status to become the town of Ōkuchi. (1 town, 5 villages)
- February 11, 1925 - The village of Higashitara was renamed to the village of Honjō.
- April 29, 1940 - The village of Hishikari was elevated to town status to become the town of Hishikari. (2 towns, 4 villages)
- November 10, 1940 - The village of Yamano was elevated to town status to become the town of Yamano. (3 towns, 3 villages)
- April 1, 1954 - The towns of Ōkuchi and Yamano, and the villages of Nishitara and Hatsuki were merged to create the city of Ōkuchi. (1 town, 1 village)
- July 15, 1954 - The town of Hishikari, and the village of Honjō were merged to create the town of Hishikari. (1 town)
- November 1, 2008 - The town of Hishikari, along with the city of Ōkuchi, was merged to create the city of Isa. Isa District was dissolved as a result of this merger.

旧郡	明治29年3月29日	明治29年 - 大正15年	昭和1年 - 昭和19年	昭和20年 - 昭和63年	平成1年 - 現在	現在
北伊佐郡	大口村	大正7年4月1日 町制	大口町	昭和29年4月1日 大口市	平成20年11月1日 伊佐市	伊佐市
北伊佐郡	山野村	山野村	昭和15年11月10日 町制	昭和29年4月1日 大口市	平成20年11月1日 伊佐市	伊佐市
北伊佐郡	羽月村	羽月村	羽月村	昭和29年4月1日 大口市	平成20年11月1日 伊佐市	伊佐市
菱刈郡	西太良村	西太良村	西太良村	昭和29年4月1日 大口市	平成20年11月1日 伊佐市	伊佐市
菱刈郡	菱刈村	菱刈村	昭和15年4月29日 町制	昭和29年7月15日 菱刈町	平成20年11月1日 伊佐市	伊佐市
菱刈郡	東太良村	大正14年2月11日 改称 本城村	本城村	昭和29年7月15日 菱刈町	平成20年11月1日 伊佐市	伊佐市

== See also ==
- List of dissolved districts of Japan
