= Neapolitan sauce =

Tomato-based sauce derived from Italian cuisine

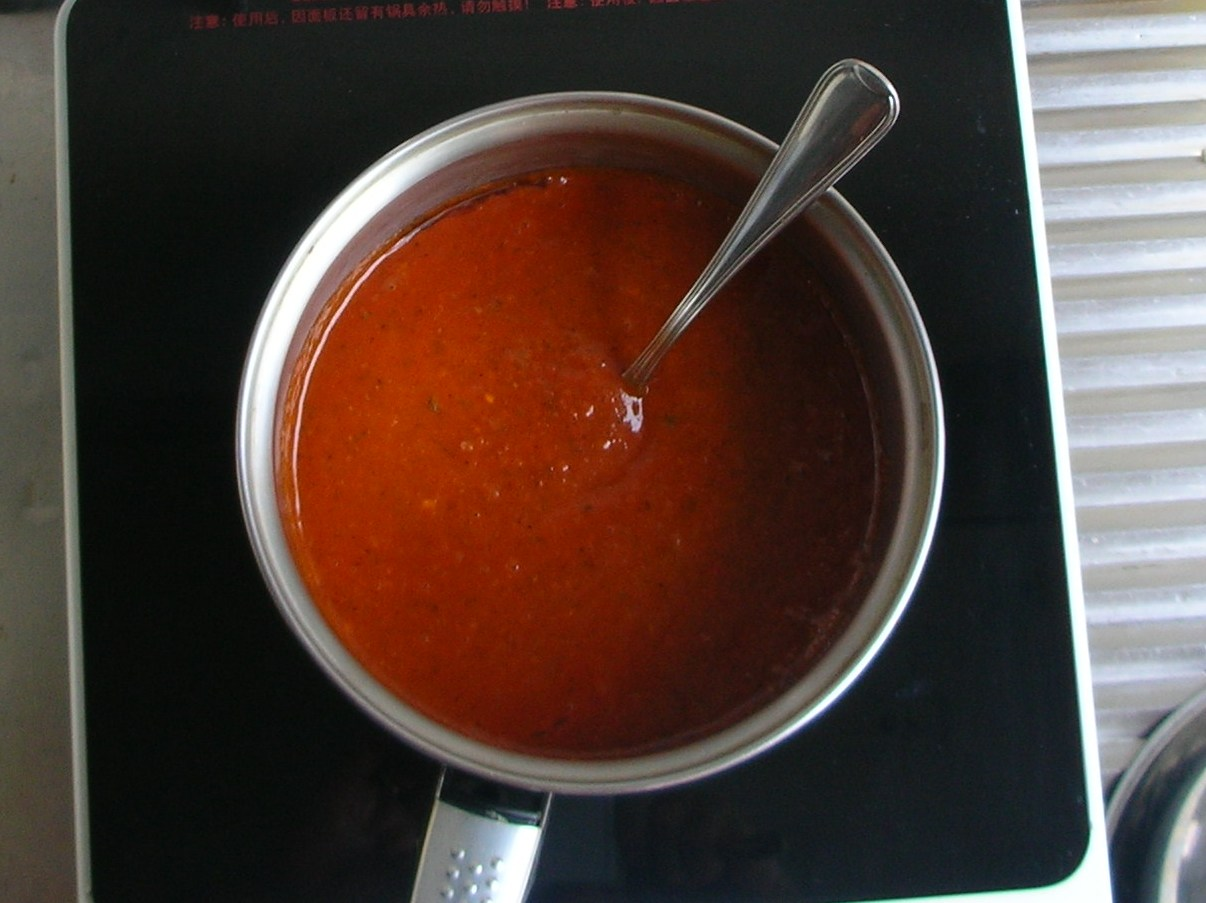
- Vegetarian Neapolitan sauce
- Type: Sauce

Neapolitan sauce is the collective name given (outside Italy) to various basic tomato-based sauces derived from Italian cuisine, often served over or alongside pasta.

In Naples, Neapolitan sauce is simply referred to as salsa, which literally translates to 'sauce'. Basil, bay leaf, thyme, oregano, peppercorns, cloves, olives, and mushrooms may be included depending on taste preferences. Some variants include carrots and celery. Outside Italy, the basic sauce is vegetarian, although meat such as minced beef or sausage can be added. By contrast, in Italy, the sauce dish carrying Naples in its name is a sauce called Neapolitan ragù.

== Origin ==
Historically, the first Italian cookbook to include a tomato-based sauce, Lo Scalco alla Moderna (The Modern Steward), was written by Italian chef Antonio Latini and was published in two volumes in 1692 and 1694. Latini served as the Steward of the First Minister to the Spanish Viceroy of Naples.
