= Hishikari mine =

Gold mine in Ise, Kagoshima, Japan

Coordinates: 32.0125°N 130.6939°E

- Interactive map of Hishikari mine
- Location: Isa, Kagoshima, Kagoshima Prefecture, Japan
- Products: Gold, Silver
- Opened: 1985

The Hishikari mine (Japanese: 菱刈鉱山) is the largest gold mine in Isa, Kagoshima, Japan. The mine has estimated reserves of 8 million oz of gold and is being developed by Sumitomo Metal Mining.
