= Oyakodon =

Japanese chicken, egg and rice dish

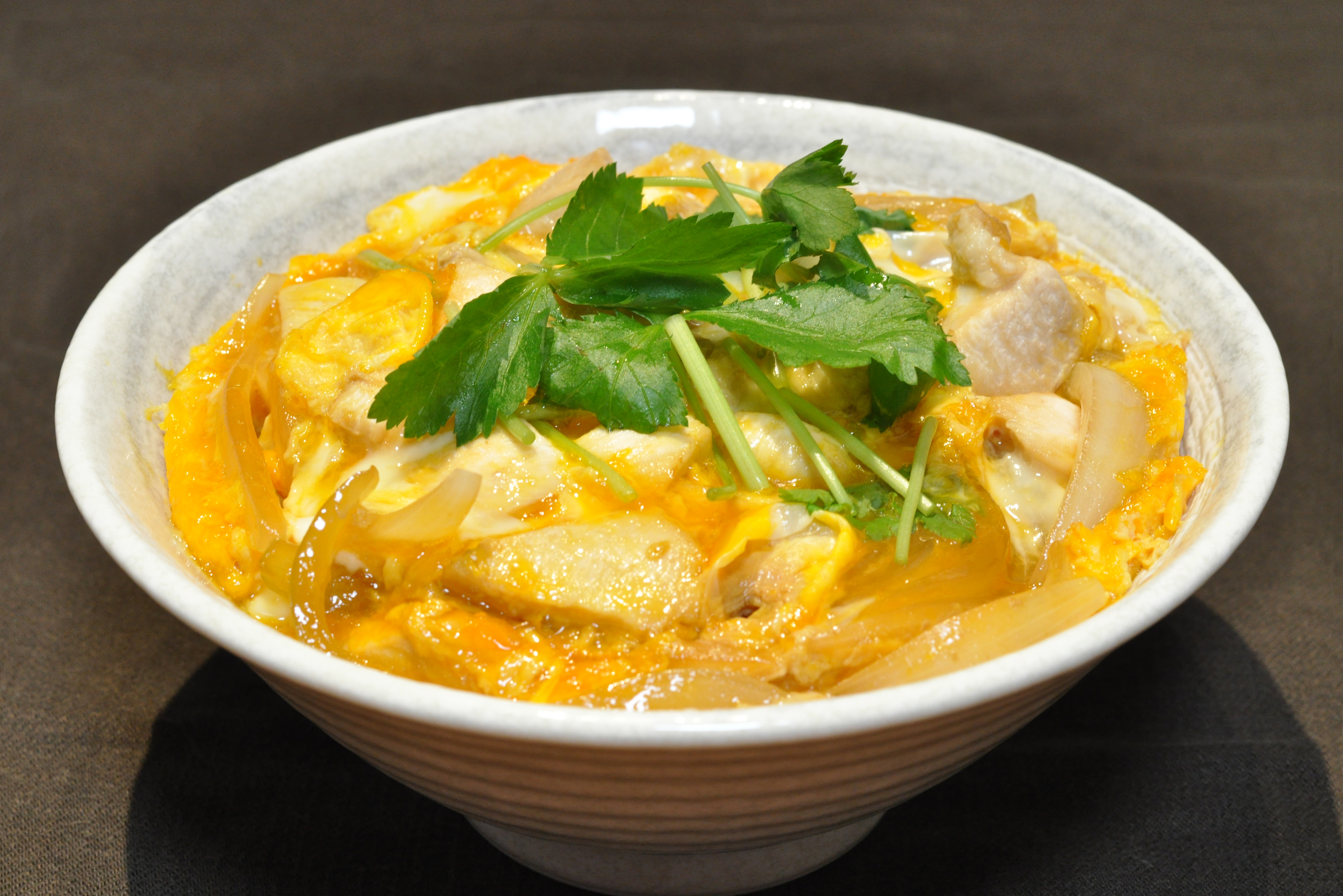
- Oyakodon
- Type: Donburi
- Place of origin: Japan
- Invented: 1891
- Main ingredients: Chicken, egg, and sliced scallion
- Ingredients generally used: Soy sauce and stock

Oyakodon (親子丼), literally "parent-and-child donburi", is a donburi, or Japanese rice bowl dish, in which chicken, egg, sliced scallion (or sometimes regular onions), and other ingredients are all simmered together in a kind of soup that is made with soy sauce and stock, and then served on top of a large bowl of rice. The name of the dish is a poetic reflection of both chicken and egg being used in the dish.

== History ==
The origins of oyakodon are subject to several theories, but one widely cited account traces its beginnings to Tamahide, a long-established gamecock cuisine restaurant in Tokyo. According to this account, a regular patron developed a habit of combining leftover chicken and warishita (the simmering sauce used for chicken and onions) with a beaten egg, serving the mixture over rice. This improvised dish came to be called "oyako-ni," meaning a stew of parent and child. The transformation into oyakodon as we know it today is credited to Toku, the wife of the fifth-generation owner Hideyoshi at Tamahide. In 1891 (Meiji 24), she reimagined this oyako-ni as a complete rice bowl meal, and this innovation is generally regarded as the prototype of modern oyakodon. At first, the dish was offered exclusively as a takeout option for delivery. However, demand grew rapidly among residents and workers in the Kabuto-cho, Yoneyama-cho, and Nihonbashi districts, who placed orders in great numbers. From these neighborhoods, the popularity of oyakodon eventually expanded beyond Tokyo and took root throughout Japan. The earliest written mention of the terms "oyako" and "don" in combination is in a newspaper advertisement for a restaurant in Kobe in 1884. The advertisement mentions dishes named oyakojōdon, oyakonamidon and oyakochūdon, possibly referring to different sizes.

== Variations ==
Several other Japanese dishes pun on the parent-and-child theme of oyakodon. Tanindon (他人丼), literally "stranger bowl", is otherwise identical but replaces the chicken with beef or pork. A dish of salmon and salmon roe served raw over rice is known as sake oyakodon (鮭親子丼) (salmon parent-child donburi).

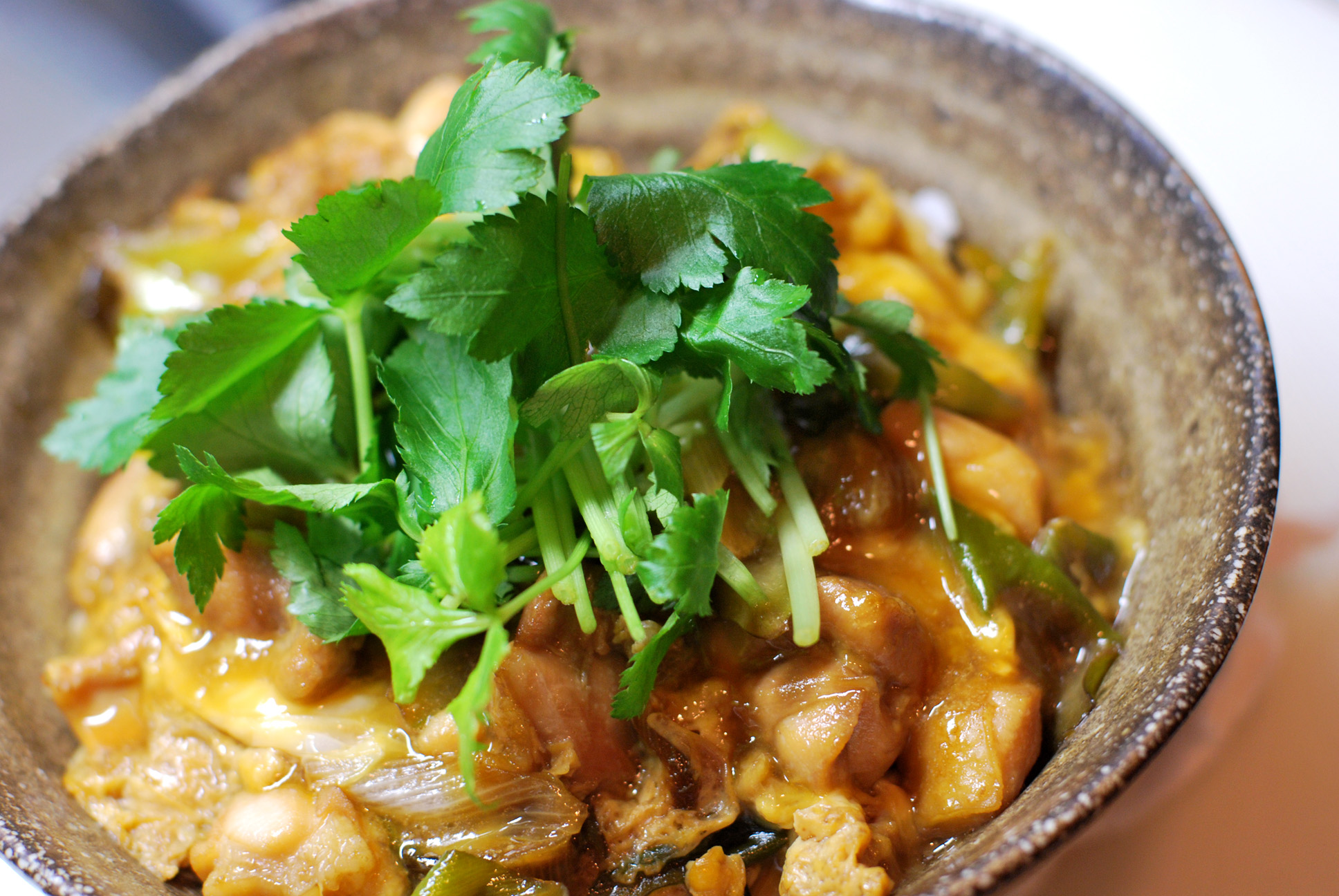

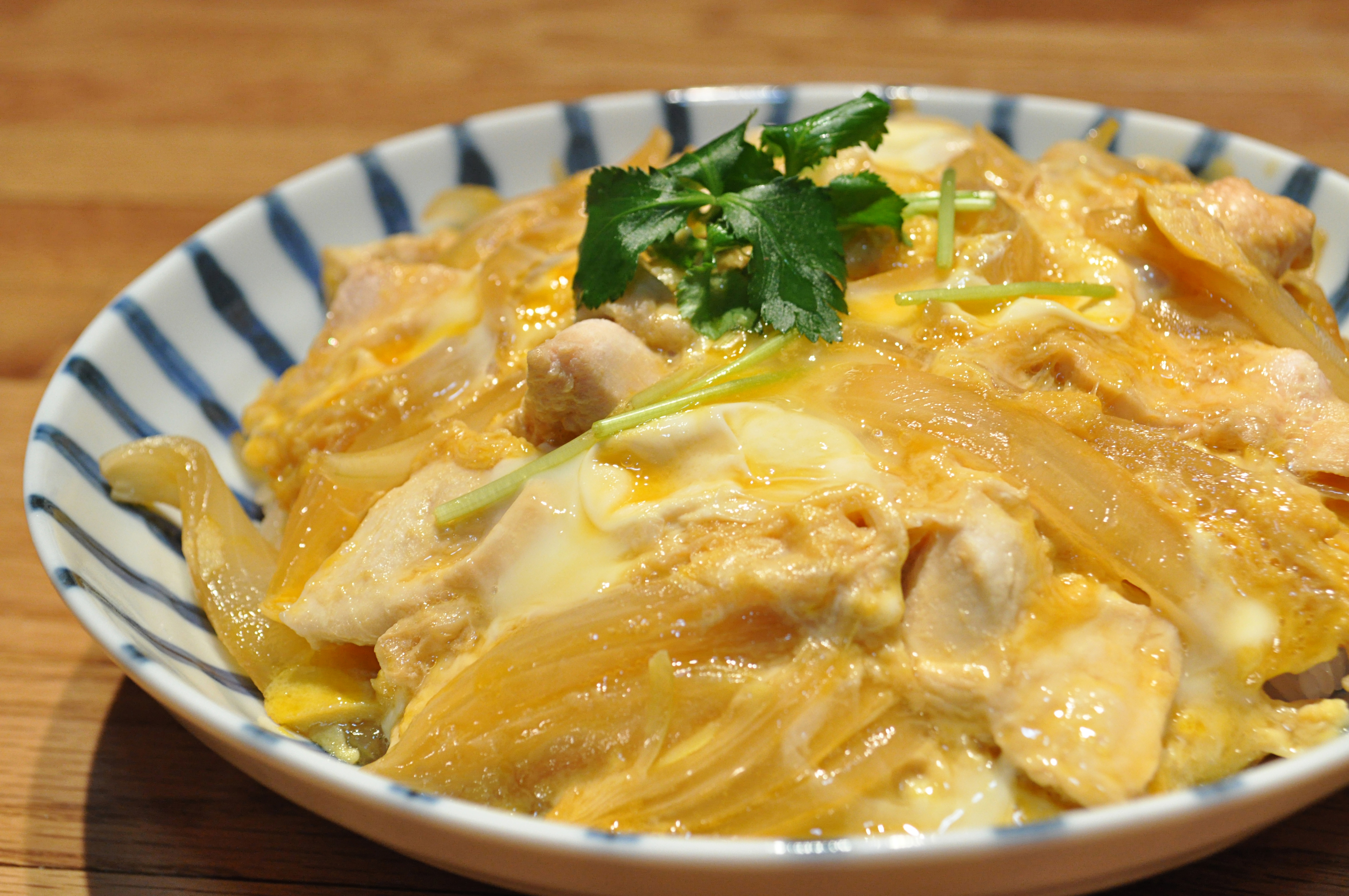

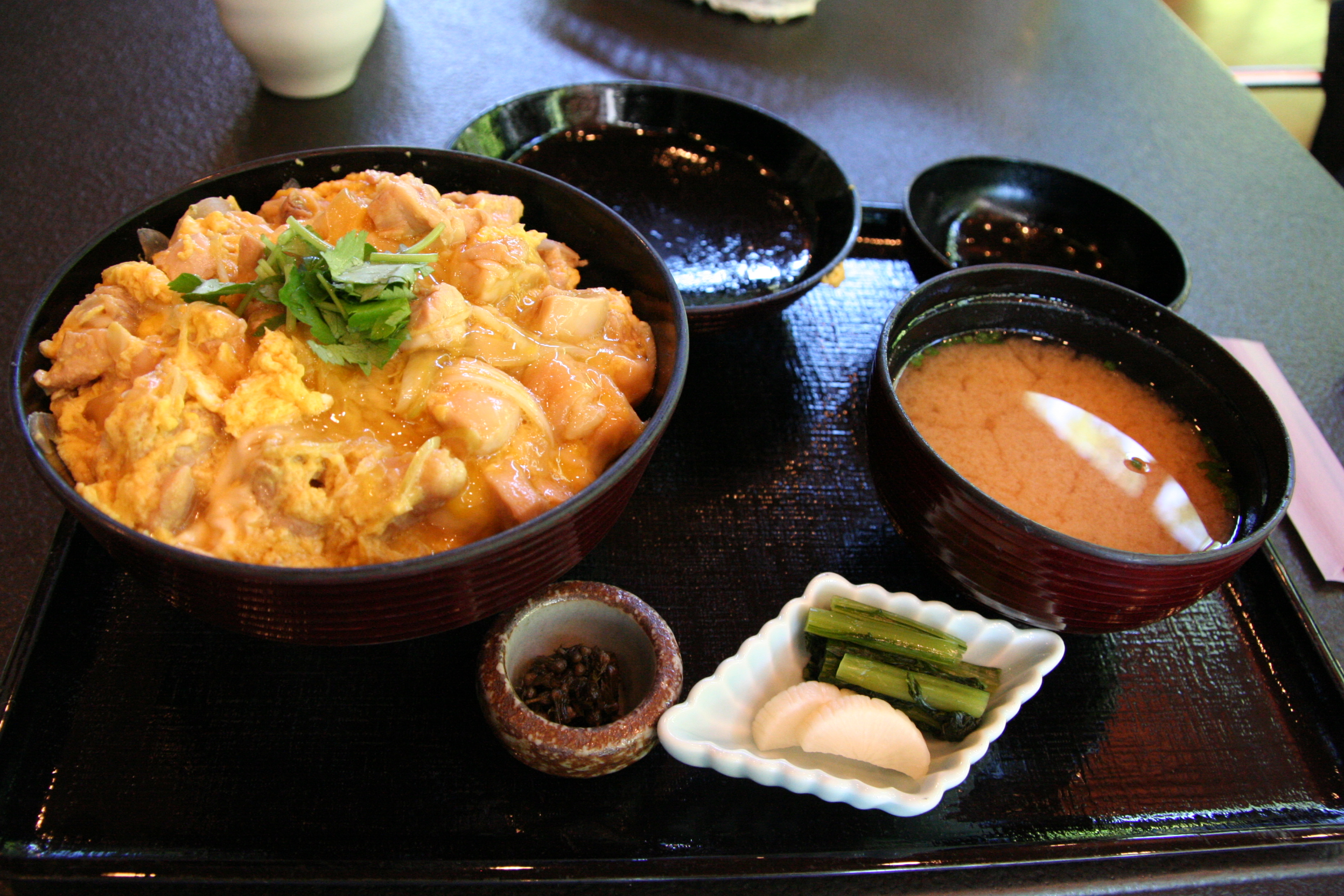

== See also ==
- Gyūdon, beef on rice
- Katsudon, pork cutlets on rice
- Unadon, grilled eel kabayaki on rice
