= Ōkuchi, Kagoshima =

Ōkuchi 大口市
- Former municipality
- Location of Ōkuchi in Kagoshima Prefecture

- Location in Japan
- Coordinates: 32°3′N 130°37′E
- Country: Japan
- Region: Kyushu
- Prefecture: Kagoshima Prefecture
- Merged: November 1, 2008 (now part of Isa)

Area
  - Total: 291.88 km^{2} (112.70 sq mi)

Population (2008)
  - Total: 21,643 (estimated)
  - Density: 78.02/km^{2} (202.1/sq mi)
- Time zone: UTC+09:00 (JST)

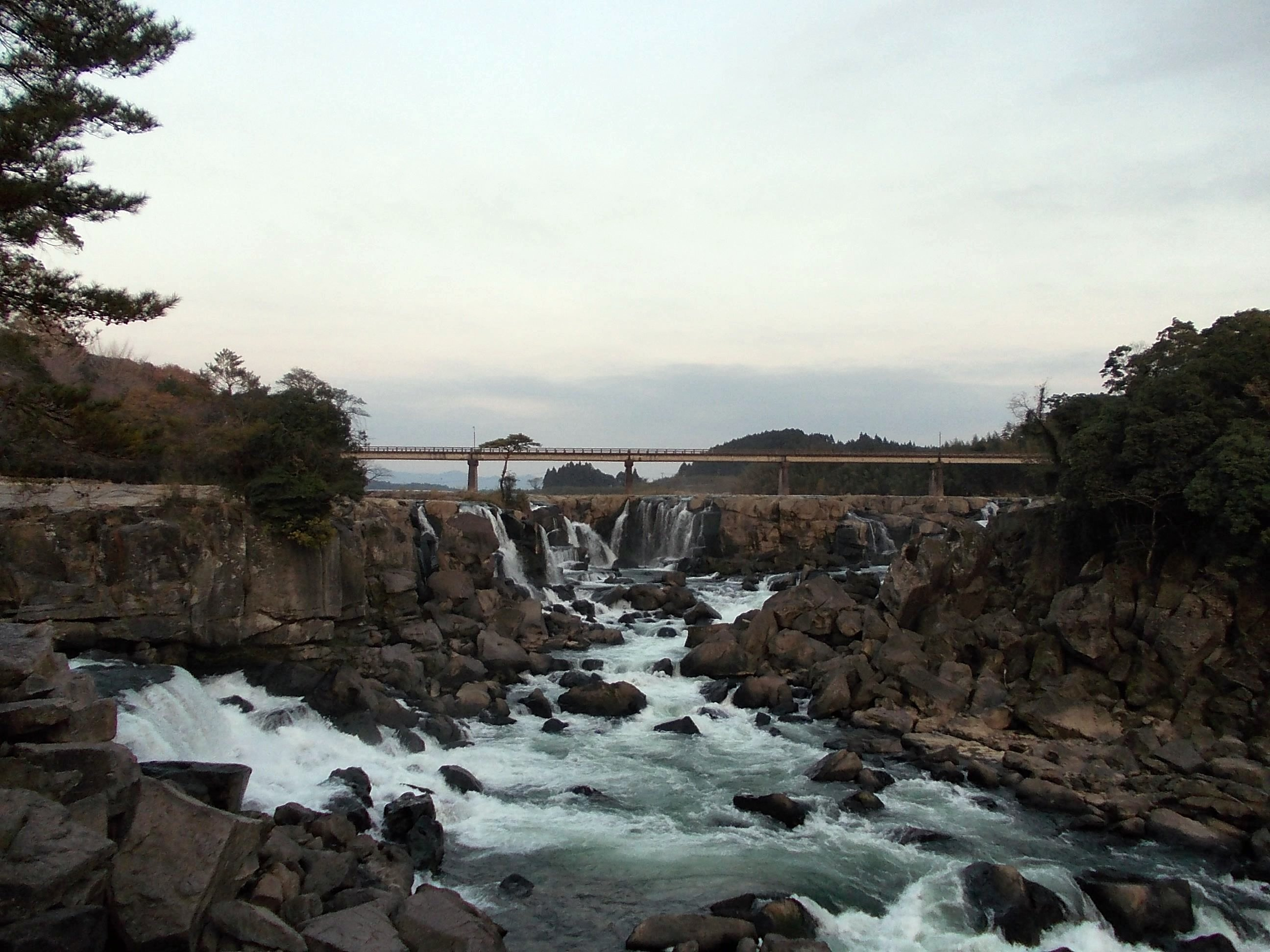
Sogi Fall, so-called "the Eastern Niagara in Kagoshima"

Ōkuchi (大口市, Ōkuchi-shi) was a city located in Kagoshima Prefecture, Japan. It is now part of the city of Isa. The city was founded on April 1, 1954.

As of 2008, the city had an estimated population of 21,643 and the density of 78.02 persons per km^{2}. The total area was 291.88 km^{2}.

On November 1, 2008, Ōkuchi was merged with the town of Hishikari (from Isa District) to create the city of Isa. Isa District was dissolved as a result of this merger.

Ōkuchi was the northernmost city on the mainland part of Kagoshima Prefecture. Only the Nagashima island of Nagashima city extends further north. Ōkuchi is a mountainous area that borders on Kumamoto Prefecture and Miyazaki Prefecture. Part of the southern border of the city is the Sendai River and the artificial lake formed from the Tsuruta dam. It is the only city in Kagoshima Prefecture that is not bordered by the sea.

At one time, Ōkuchi was a prosperous city but has declined for several reasons in recent years. First, there has been a decline in forestry and agriculture in the area, but the aging Japanese population and the flight to larger cities have also been significant factors. For these reasons two Japanese National Railways railway lines that served Ōkuchi were discontinued in the 1987 and 1988. They were the Yamano line that went from Minamata to Kurino and the Miyajo line that went from Sendai to Ōkuchi.

== Neighboring municipalities ==
Cities: Izumi, Hitoyoshi (Kumamoto), Minamata (Kumamoto), Ebino (Miyazaki)

Districts: Satsuma District, Isa District, Kuma District (Kumamoto).

== Transportation ==
=== Railways ===
Shin-Minamata Station on the Kyushu Shinkansen is 35 km northwest (operated by Kyushu Railway Company)

=== Highways ===
- National Highway 267
- National Highway 268
- National Highway 447
- Kyushu Expressway Hitoyoshi Interchange is 30 km northeast and Kurino Interchange is 20 km southeast of Ōkuchi

=== Bus ===
- Nangoku Kotsu Bus

=== Airport ===
Kagoshima Airport in Kirishima (35 km SSE of Ōkuchi)

== Sister cities ==
Ōkuchi has two sister cities:

- Nishinoomote, Japan
- Namhae, South Korea
