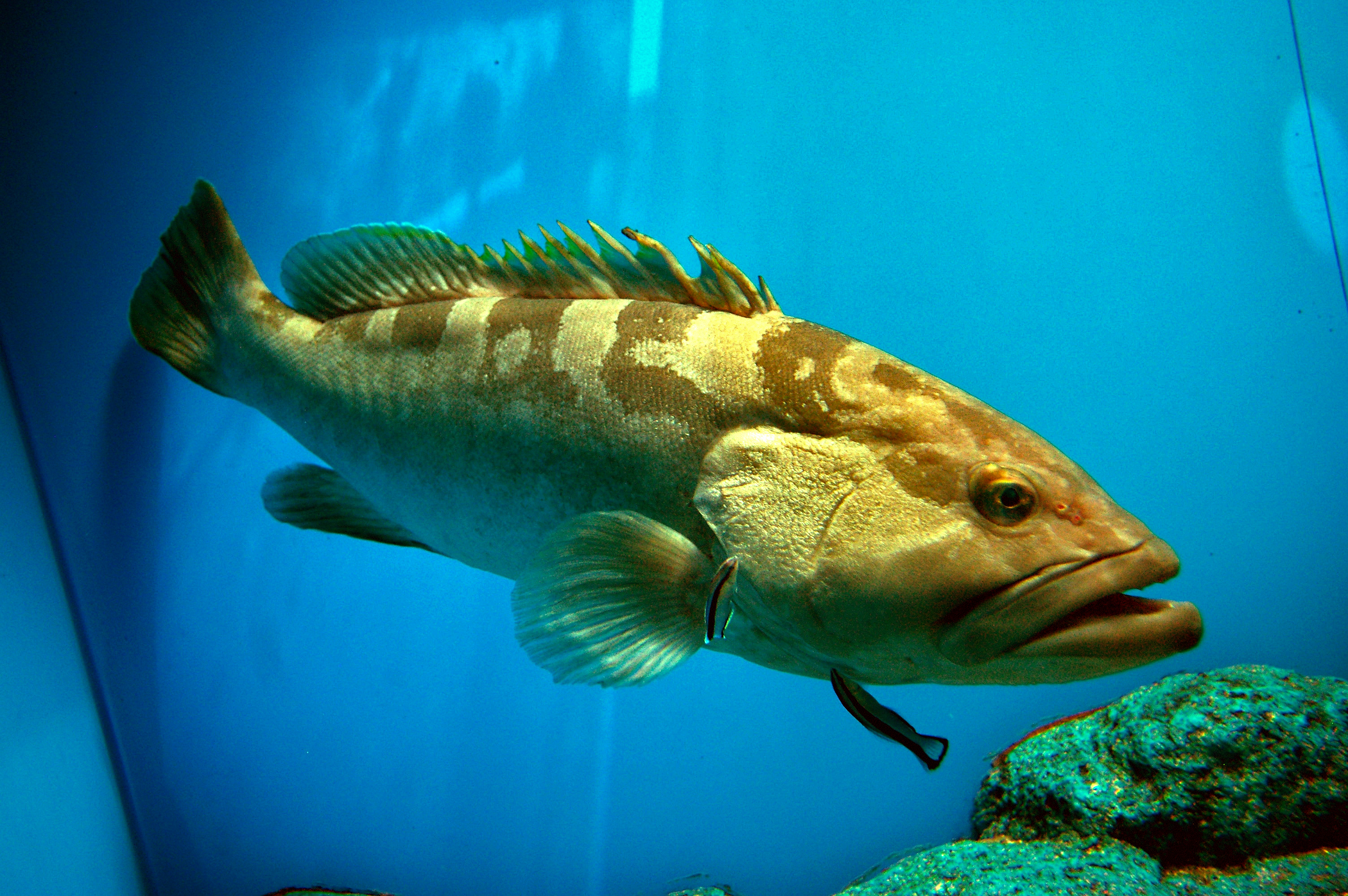

Conservation status
- Vulnerable (IUCN 3.1)

Scientific classification
- Kingdom: Animalia
- Phylum: Chordata
- Class: Actinopterygii
- Division: Teleostei
- Order: Perciformes
- Suborder: Percoidei
- Family: Epinephelidae
- Genus: Epinephelus
- Species: E. bruneus

Binomial name
- Epinephelus bruneus (Bloch, 1793)

Synonyms
- Serranus moara Temminck & Schlegel, 1842; Cephalopholis moara (Temminck & Schlegel, 1842); Epinephelus moara (Temminck & Schlegel, 1842)

= Epinephelus bruneus =

Species of fish

Epinephelus bruneus, commonly known as the longtooth grouper, kelp grouper or jabari, is a species of marine ray-finned fish, a grouper from the subfamily Epinephelinae which is part of the family Serranidae, which also includes the anthias and sea basses. It is found in northwest Pacific in eastern Asia, and in Japan is known as Kue.

== Description ==
Epinephelus bruneus has an elongate body which has a standard length which is 3.0 to 3.6 times its depth. The dorsal profile of the head between the eyes is convex. The preopercle has an angle where the serrations are notably enlarged. There is a small spine on the upper edge of the gill cover and this upper edge is convex. The dorsal fin contains 11 spines and 13-15 soft rays while the anal fin has 3 spines and 8 soft rays. It has 64-72 scales in its lateral line. The larger adults are dark greyish brown in colour, and may be marked with faint blotches on their nbacks, although these may be absent. They also have a covering of small grey spots on their bodies which form short longitudinal lines and creating a mottled pattern. The lower margin of the anal fin and the lower corner of caudal fin have white edges. The juveniles are pale yellowish brown in colour, with 6 irregular, diagonal dark bars within which there are irregular pale spots. The first of these bars extends from nape to eye and the last is on the caudal peduncle. There are 3 dark brown bands which radiate from lower part of eye and some juveniles have greenish yellow membranes between the rearmost spines of the dorsal fin. The maximum published total length for this species is 136 centimetres (54 in), although the most common length is around 60 centimetres (24 in), and the maximum recorded weight is 33 kilograms (73 lb).

== Distribution ==
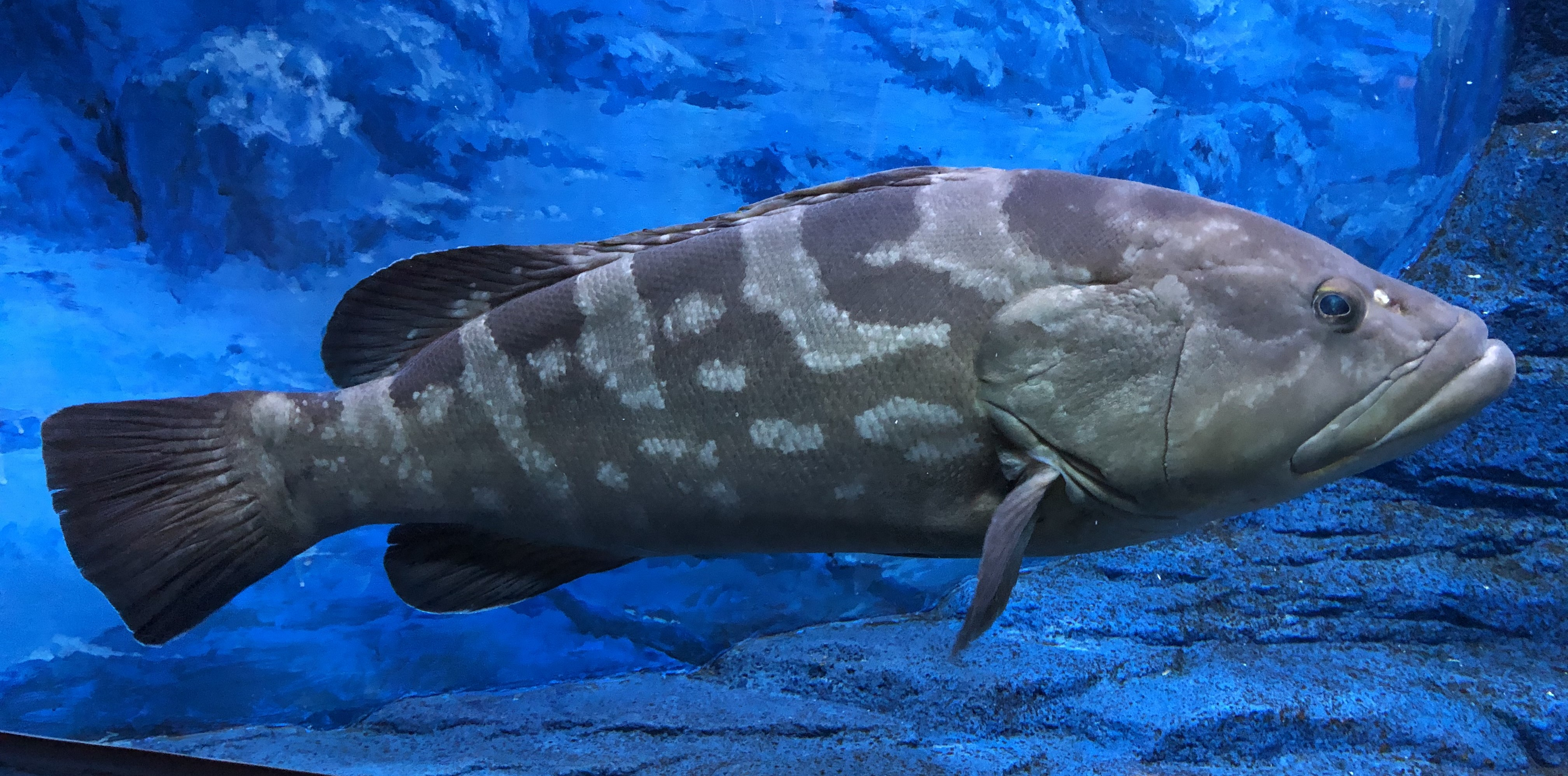

Epinephelus bruneus is found in the Western Pacific Ocean where it occurs from southern Japan and Taiwan and along the coast of Asia from southern Korea to Hainan and Hong Kong in southern China. However, see taxonomy below.

== Habitat and biology ==
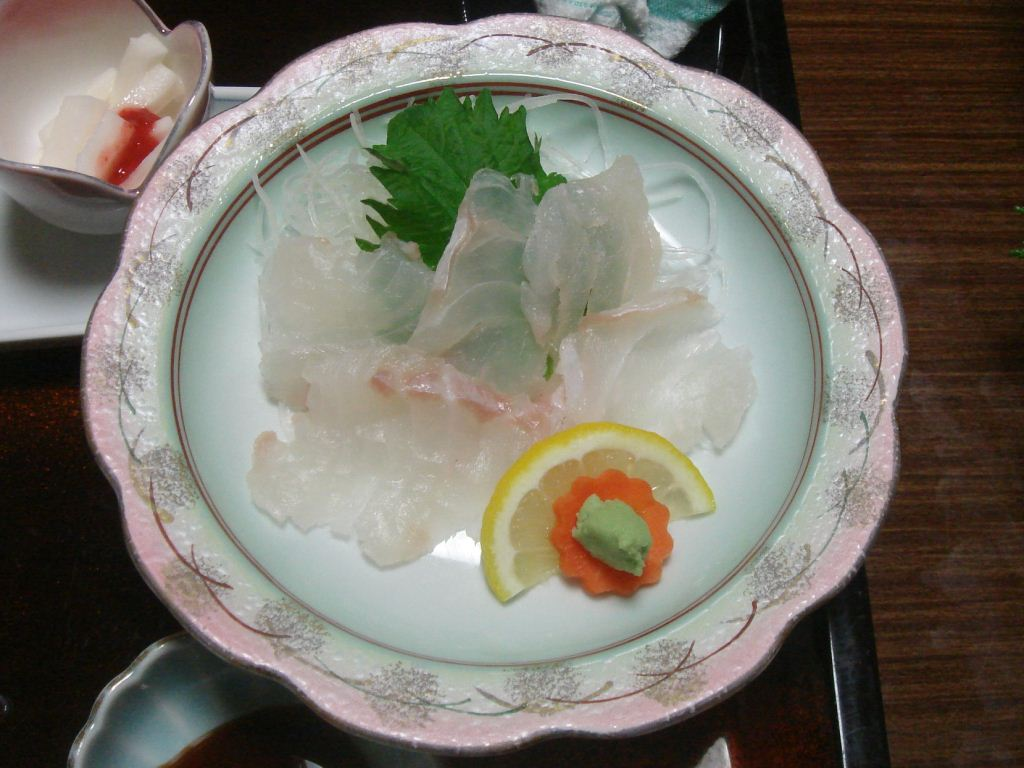
As sashimi

Epinephelus bruneus is found over rocky reefs and over areas of muddy substrates. Adults are found at depths of 20 to 200 metres (66 to 656 ft). They are also found over coral and artificial reefs, Juveniles are found in shallower water, less than 5 metres (16 ft). The biology of this species is little known.

== Taxonomy ==
Epinephelus bruneus was first formally described in 1793 by the German physician and naturalist Marcus Elieser Bloch (1723–1799) with the type locality given as "Norway", apparently an error for China. Some authorities have split E. bruneus into two species, E. bruneus and E. moara and the exact distribution of these two species still require to be determined. E. moara appears to be found in Japan, Korea, Taiwan and China as afar south as Fujian.

In 2024, an examination of type specimens revealed that the nominal species E. bruneus and E. moara were the same species, the longtooth grouper. Thus the mud grouper (E. randalli), found mainly in the South China Sea, was described as a new species.

== Utilisation ==
Epinephelus bruneus is considered an excellent fish for eating and is caught using hand lines, longlines and trawls.
