= Nodagou Station =

Railway station in Izumi, Kagoshima Prefecture, Japan

Nodagou Station (Note: From 1 October 2019, the official Hisatsu Orange Railway site, platform signage, and station guides list the romanised spelling as Nodagō, though the former romanization of Nodagou remains common usage.): 野田郷駅; のだごう
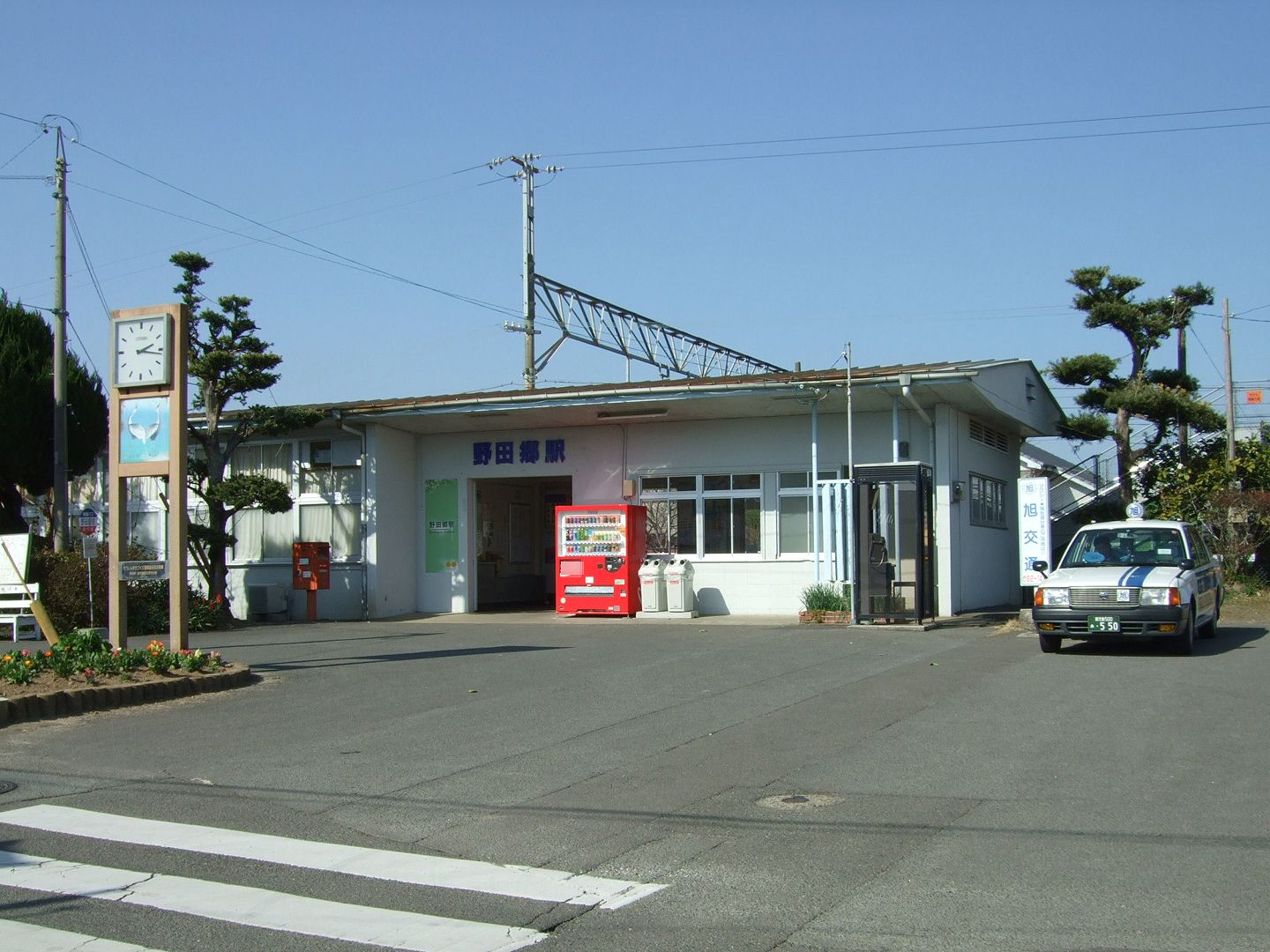
- Station entrance in 2008

General information
- Location: Nodacho Shimomyo, Izumi-shi, Kagoshima-ken 899-0502; Japan
- Coordinates: 32.06323°N 130.2674°E
- Operator: Hisatsu Orange Railway Co., Ltd.
- Line: ■ Hisatsu Orange Railway Line
- Distance: 75.3 km from Yatsushiro; 3.2 km from Takaono
- Platforms: 2 side platforms
- Tracks: 2

Construction
- Structure type: At-grade

Other information
- Station code: OR19
- Website: Official website (in Japanese)

History
- Opened: 25 March 1923
- Original company: Japanese Government Railways

Passengers
- FY2019: 377
Location
- Location within Kagoshima Prefecture Location within Japan

Nodagou Station (野田郷駅, Nodagō-eki) is a passenger railway station located in the city of Izumi, Kagoshima Prefecture, Japan. It is served by the It is operated by third-sector railway company Hisatsu Orange Railway.

== Lines ==
The station is served by the Hisatsu Orange Railway Line that follows the former coastal route of the JR Kyushu Kagoshima Main Line connecting Yatsushiro and Sendai. It is located 75.3 km from the starting point of the line at Yatsushiro.

== Station layout ==
The station consists of two side platforms and two tracks, and is a simple consignment station with a ticket window and a waiting room in a reinforced concrete station building of the former JNR standard type built in 1959. The station is currently unattended.

=== Platforms ===
1	■ ■ Hisatsu Orange Railway	for Izumi, Minamata, and Yatsushiro
1	■ ■Hisatsu Orange Railway	for Akune and Sendai

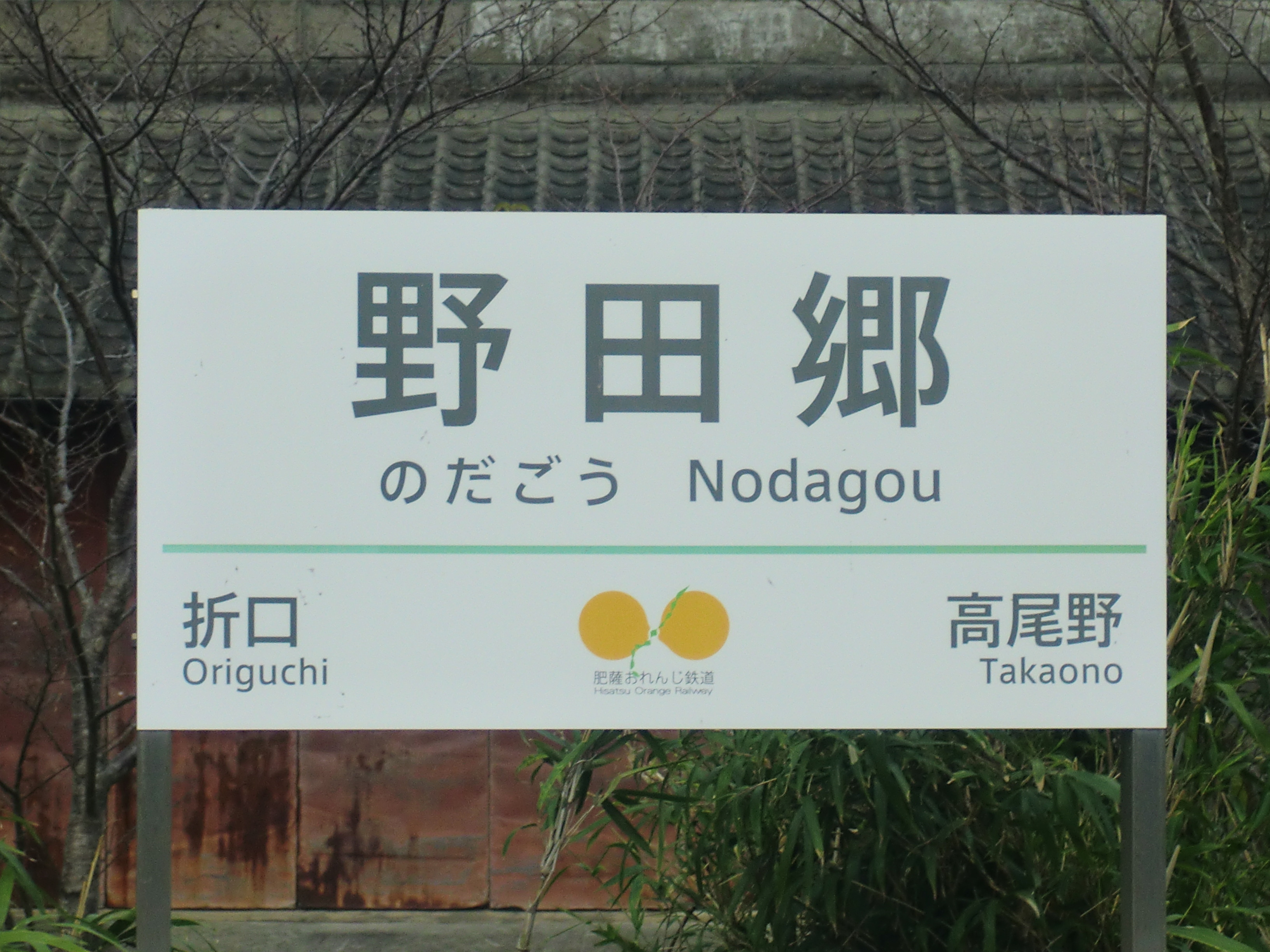
Station sign

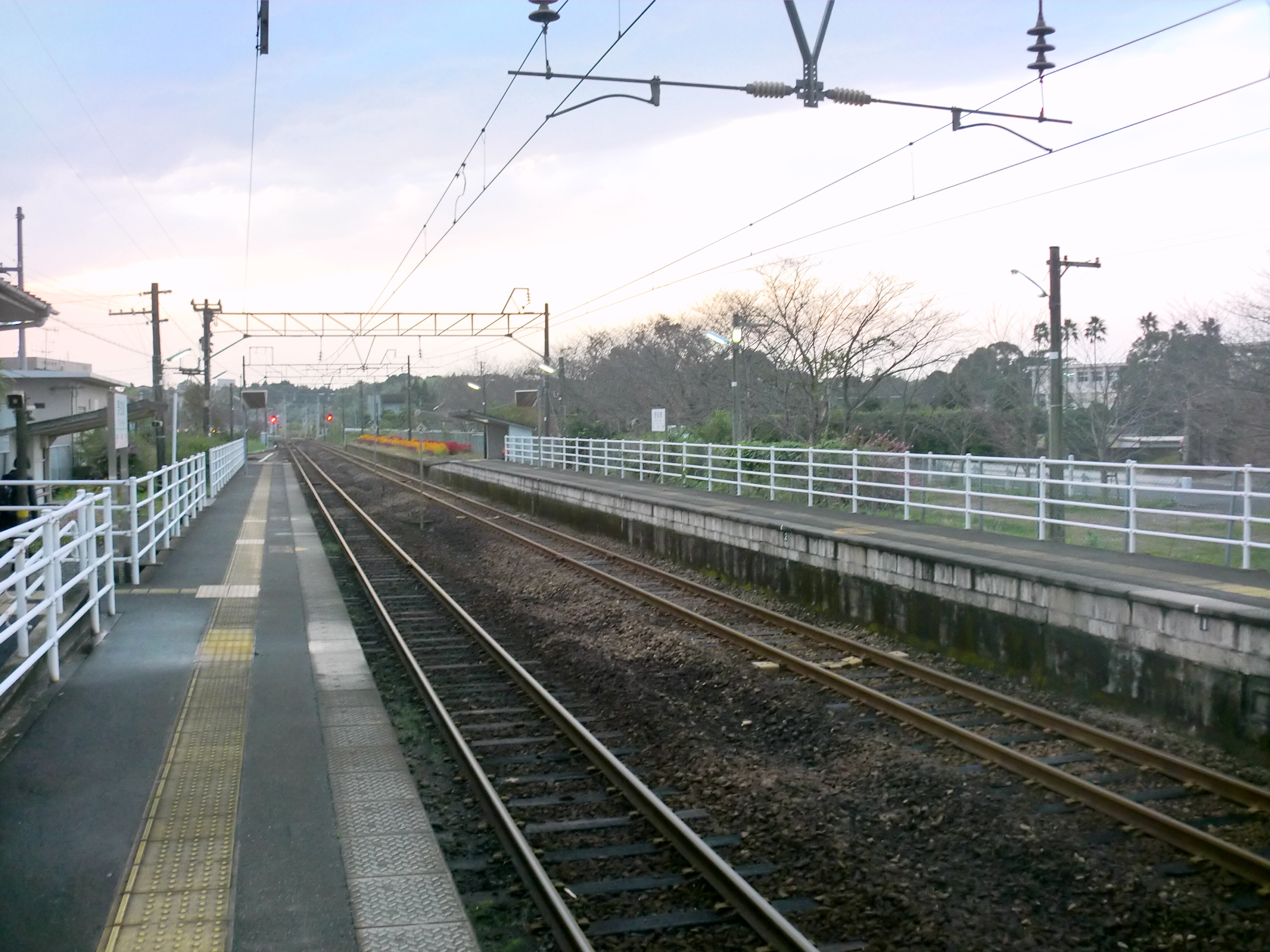
View of station platforms

== Adjacent stations ==
«	Service	»
Hisatsu Orange Railway Line
Takaono	–	Origuchi
Rapid Express Ocean Liner Satsuma: Does not stop at this station

== History ==
Nodagou Station was opened on 25 March 1923 as a station on the Japanese Government Railways Sendai Line, which was incorporated into the Kagoshima Main Line on 17 October 1927. With the privatization of the Japan National Railways on 1 April 1987, the station was transferred to JR Kyushu. On 13 March 2004, with the opening of the Kyushu Shinkansen, the station was transferred to the Hisatsu Orange Railway.

== Passenger statistics ==
The average daily passenger traffic in fiscal 2019 was 377 people.

== Surrounding area ==
- Izumi City Hall Noda Branch (formerly Noda Town Hall)
- Kagoshima Prefectural Noda Girls' High School
- Izumi City Noda Junior High School
- Izumi City Noda Elementary School

== See also ==
- List of railway stations in Japan
