= Takaono Station =

Railway station in Izumi, Kagoshima Prefecture, Japan

Takaono Station: 高尾野駅; たかおの
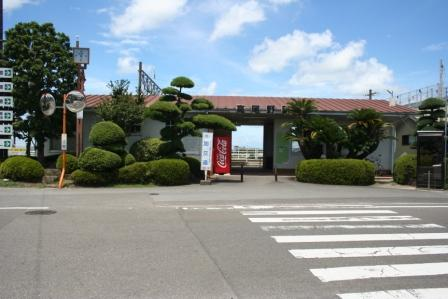
- Crossing and station entrance in 2009

General information
- Location: Takaonomachi Shibahiki, Izumi-shi, Kagoshima-ken 899-0402; Japan
- Coordinates: 32.06249°N 130.30183°E
- Operator: Hisatsu Orange Railway Co., Ltd.
- Line: ■ Hisatsu Orange Railway Line
- Distance: 72.1 km from Yatsushiro; 3.8 km from Nishi-Izumi
- Platforms: 2 side platforms
- Tracks: 2

Construction
- Structure type: At-grade

Other information
- Station code: OR18
- Website: Official website (in Japanese)

History
- Opened: 15 October 1923
- Original company: Japanese Government Railways

Passengers
- FY2019: 138
Location
- Location within Kagoshima Prefecture Location within Japan

Takaono Station (高尾野駅, Takaono-eki) is a passenger railway station located in the city of Izumi, Kagoshima Prefecture, Japan. It is served and operated by third-sector railway company Hisatsu Orange Railway.

== Lines ==
The station is served by the Hisatsu Orange Railway Line that follows the former coastal route of the JR Kyushu Kagoshima Main Line connecting Yatsushiro and Sendai. It is located 72.1 km from the starting point of the line at Yatsushiro.

== Station layout ==
The station consists of two side platforms at street level. It has a reinforced concrete station building with a small waiting room.

=== Platforms ===
1	■ ■ Hisatsu Orange Railway	for Akune and Sendai
2	■ ■Hisatsu Orange Railway	for Izumi, Minamata, and Yatsushiro

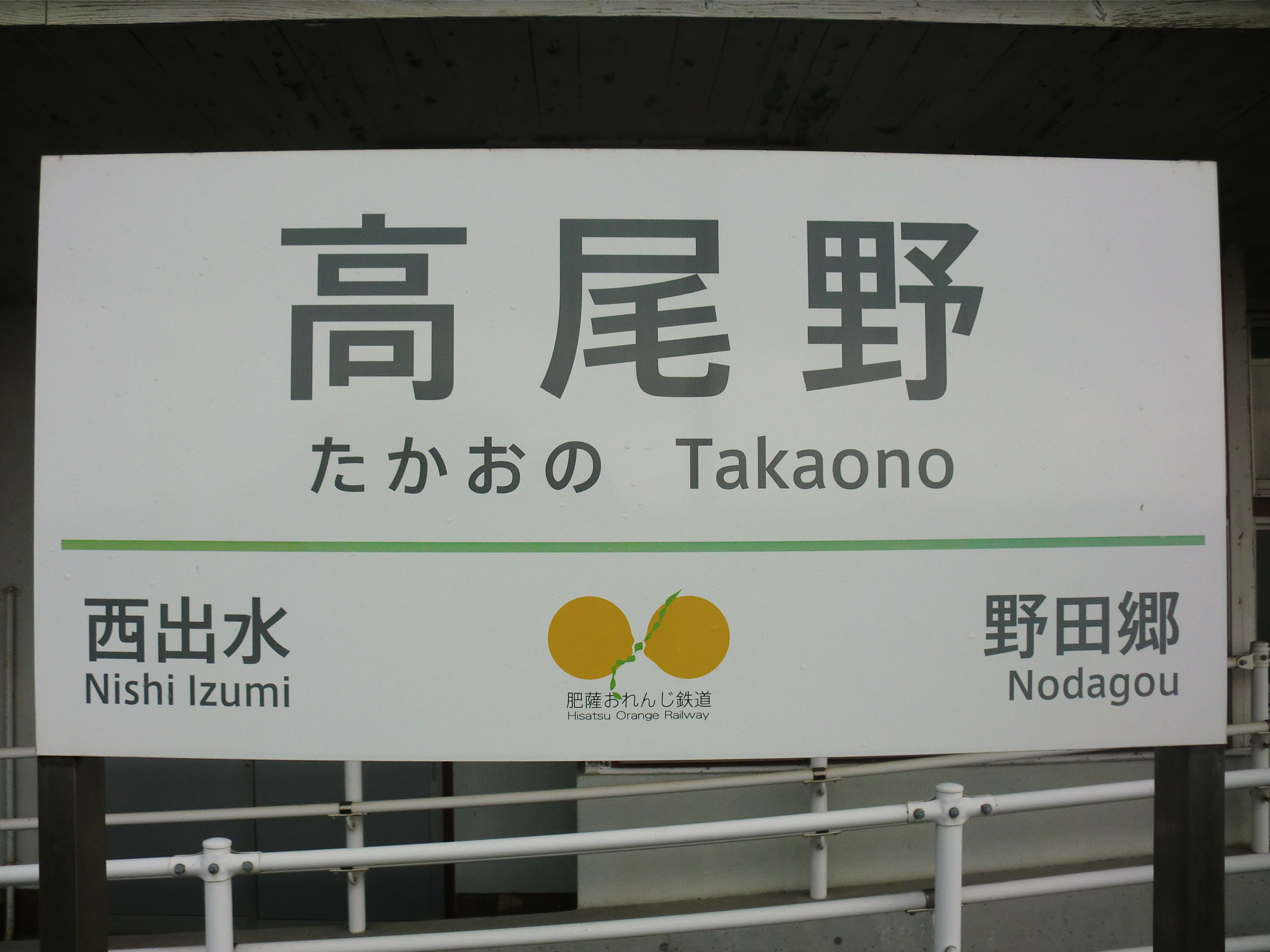
Station sign

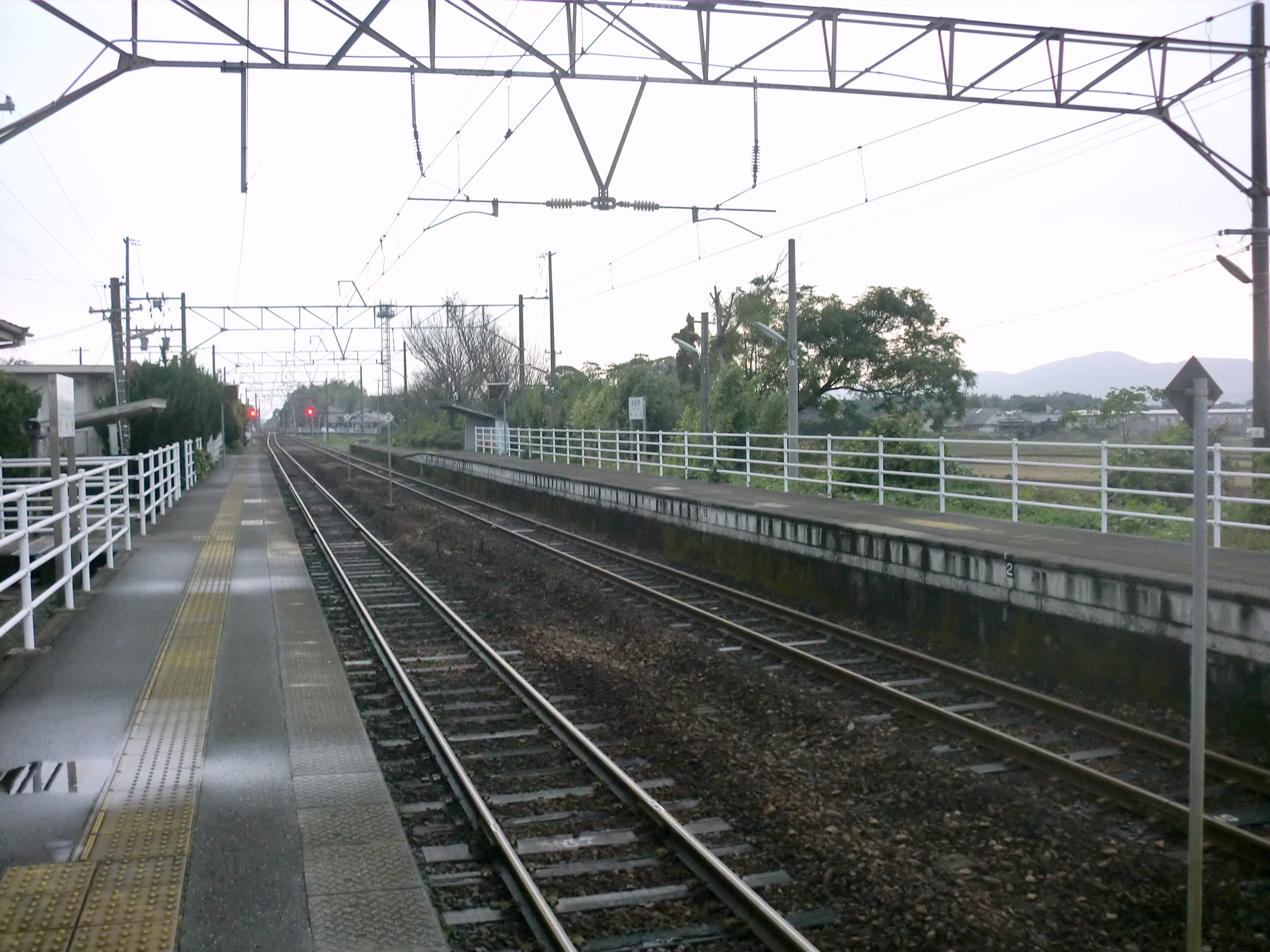
View of station platforms

== Adjacent stations ==
«	Service	»
Hisatsu Orange Railway Line
Nishi-Izumi	–	Nodagou
Rapid Express Ocean Liner Satsuma: Does not stop at this station

== History ==
Takaono Station was opened on October 15th, 1923 as a station on the Japanese Government Railways Sendai Line, which was incorporated into the Kagoshima Main Line on October 17, 1927. With the privatization of the Japan National Railways on April 1, 1987, the station was transferred to JR Kyushu. On March 13, 2004, with the opening of the Kyushu Shinkansen, the station was transferred to the Hisatsu Orange Railway.

== Passenger statistics ==
The average daily passenger traffic in fiscal 2019 was 138 people.

== Surrounding area ==
- Izumi City Takaono Junior High School
- Izumi City Takaono Elementary School
- Izumi City Takaono Branch Office (formerly Takaono Town Hall)

== See also ==
- List of railway stations in Japan
