= Satsuma Ohkawa Station =

Railway station in Akune, Kagoshima Prefecture, Japan

Satsuma Ohkawa Station (Note: On 1 October 2019 the official Hisatsu Orange Railway site, platform signage, and station guides were changed to list the Romanised spelling Satsuma Ōkawa, although the previously romanization of Satsuma Ohkawa, remains in common usage.): 薩摩大川駅; さつまおおかわ
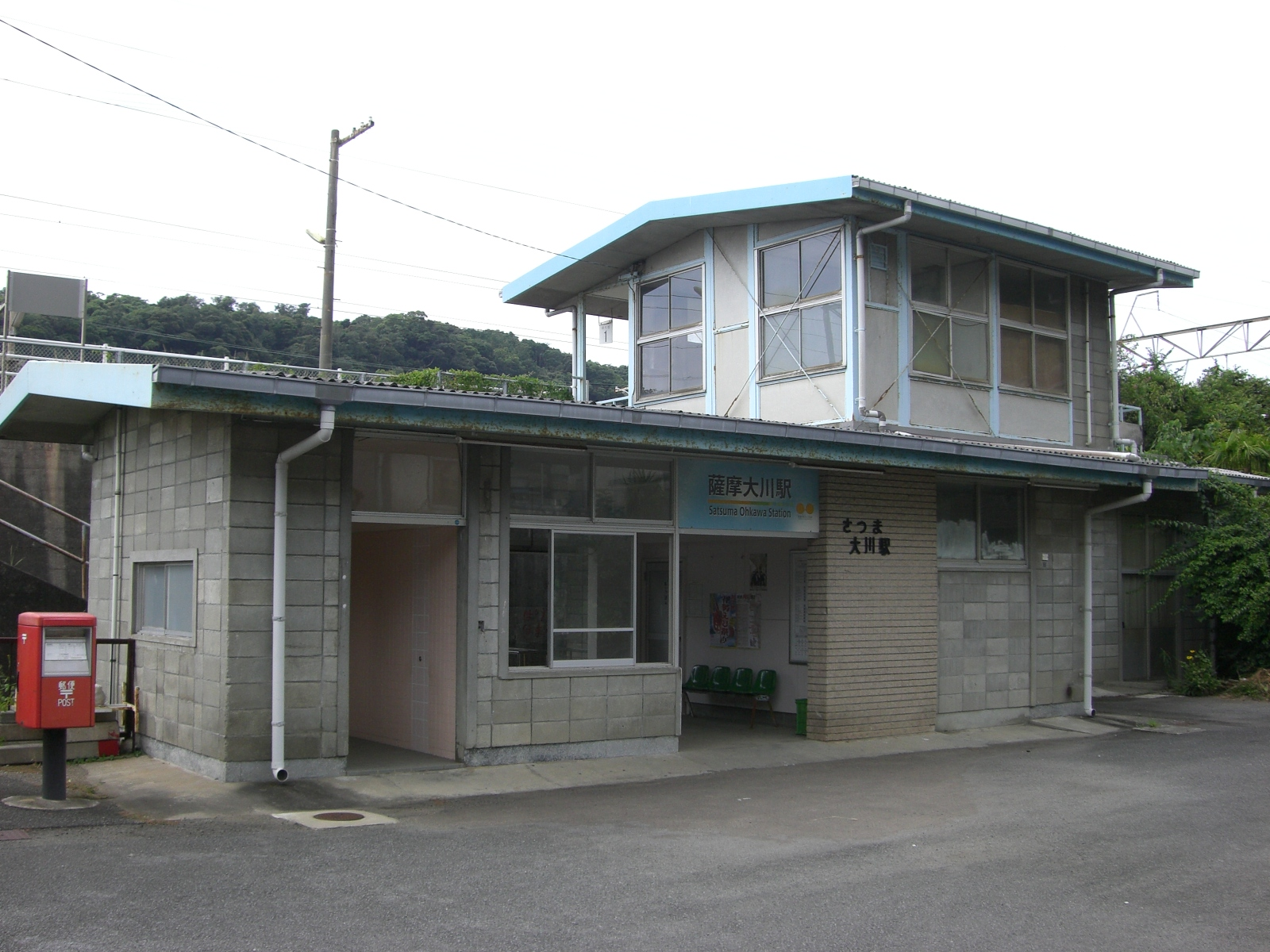
- Satsuma Ohkawa Station building in 2007

General information
- Location: Okawa, Akune-shi, Kagoshima-ken 899-1741; Japan
- Coordinates: 31.9494649°N 130.2191016°E
- Operator: Hisatsu Orange Railway Co., Ltd.
- Line: Hisatsu Orange Railway
- Distance: 95.7 km from Yatsushiro; 3.5 km from Ushinohama
- Platforms: 2 side platforms
- Tracks: 2

Construction
- Structure type: At-grade

Other information
- Website: Official website (in Japanese)

History
- Opened: 15 December 1936
- Original company: Japanese Government Railways
Location
- Location within Kagoshima Prefecture Location within Japan

Satsuma Ohkawa Station (薩摩大川駅, Satsuma Ōkawa-eki) is a passenger railway station located in the city of Akune, Kagoshima Prefecture, Japan. It is served by the It is operated by third-sector railway company Hisatsu Orange Railway.

== Lines ==
The station is served by the Hisatsu Orange Railway Line that follows the former coastal route of the JR Kyushu Kagoshima Main Line connecting Yatsushiro and Sendai. It is located 95.7 km from the starting point of the line at Yatsushiro.

== Station layout ==
The station consists of two side platforms and two tracks. It is an unattended station, with a two-story station building made of concrete blocks. Because the tracks are located on a higher level, the second floor of the station building is a waiting room facing the platform. Because the switch on the river side is inside a tunnel, the tunnel entrance is double track and the exit (towards Kawauchi) is single track, which is unusual.

=== Platforms ===
1	■ ■ Hisatsu Orange Railway	for Sendai
1	■ ■Hisatsu Orange Railway	for Akune, Izumi, Minamata, and Yatsushiro

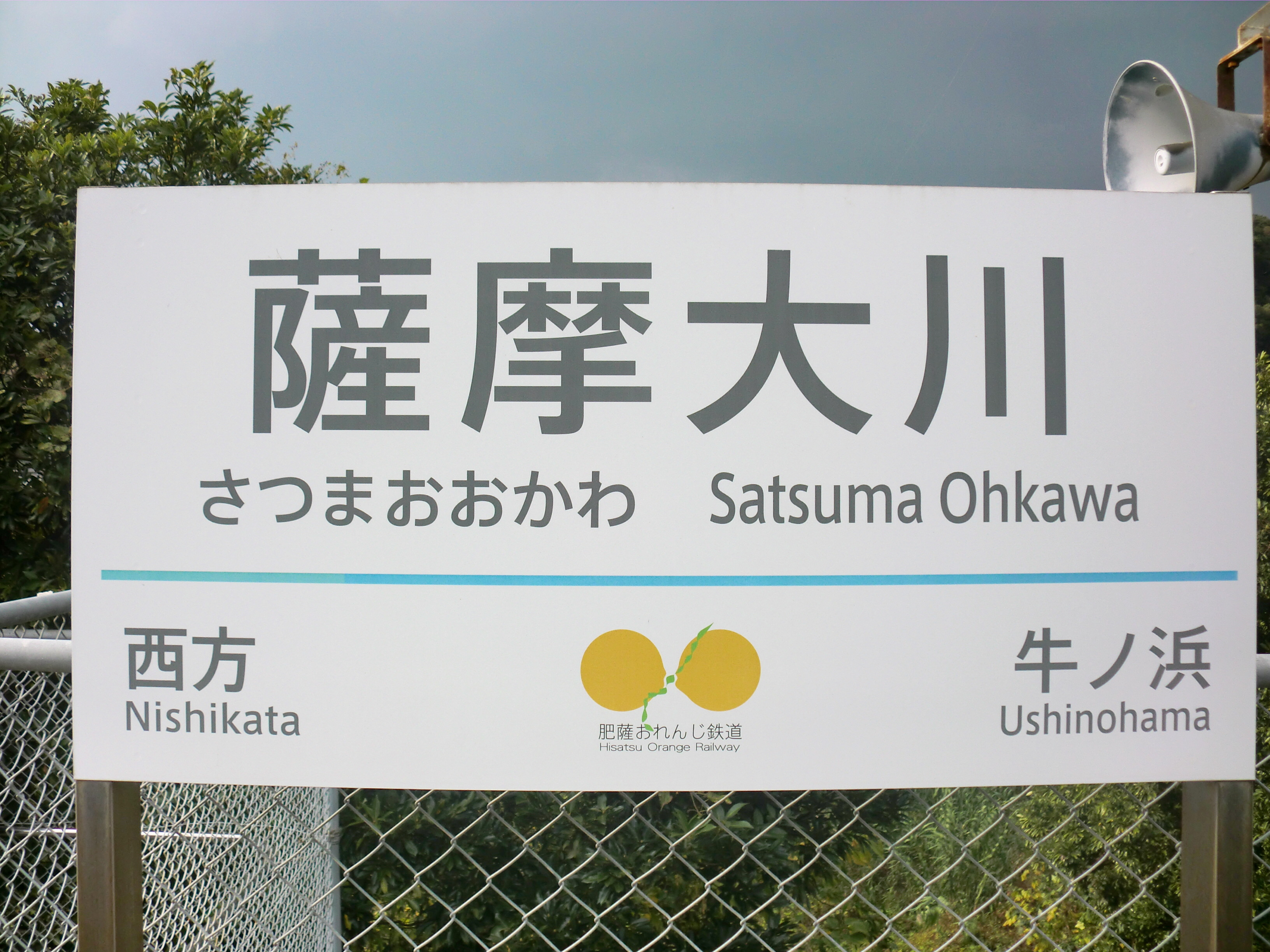
Station sign

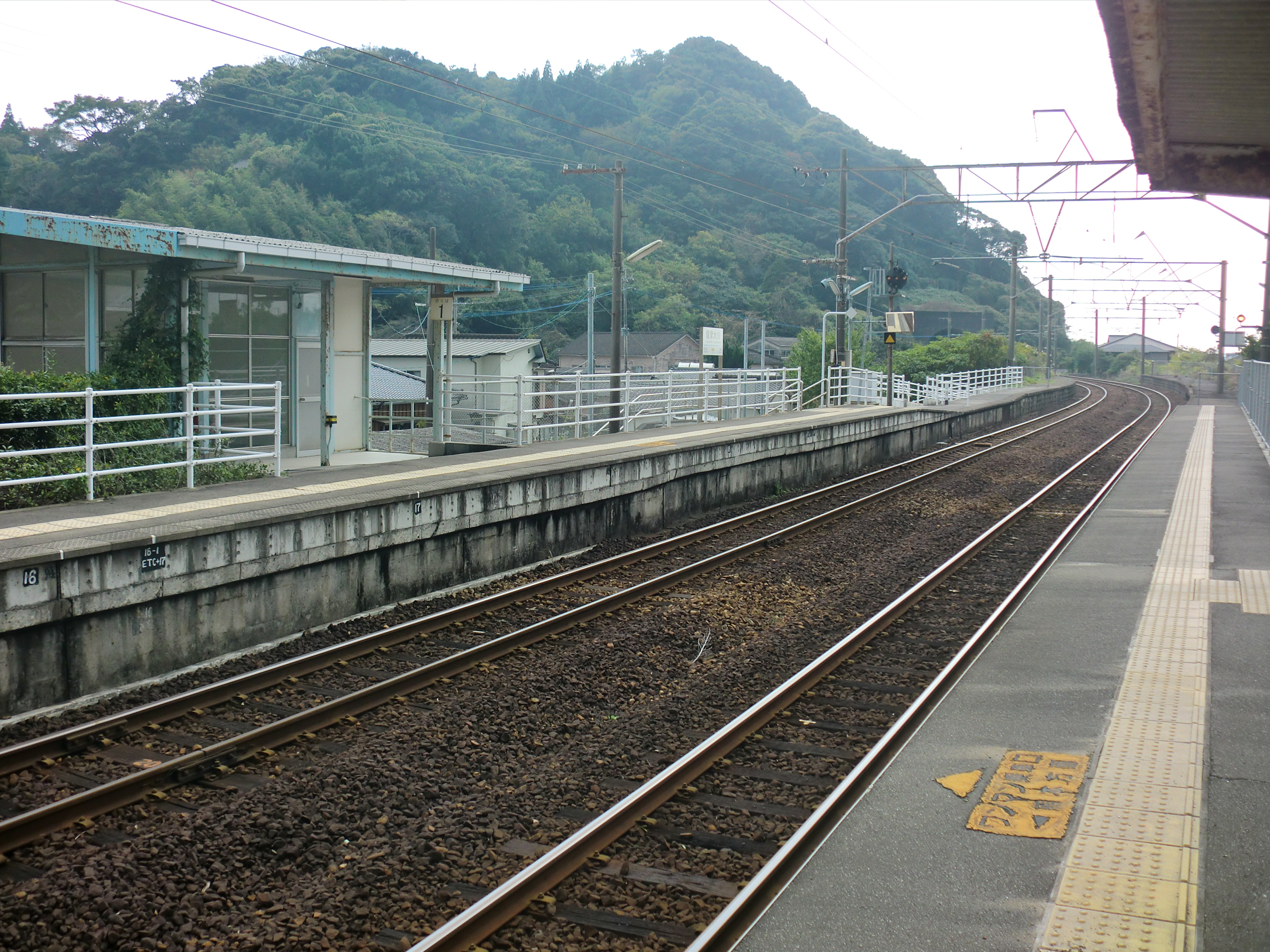
View of station platforms

== Adjacent stations ==
«	Service	»
Hisatsu Orange Railway Line
Ushinohama	–	Nishikata
Rapid Express Ocean Liner Satsuma: Does not stop at this station

== History ==
Satsuma Ohkawa Station was opened on 15 December 1936 as a station on the Japanese Government Railways Kagoshima Main Line. With the privatization of the Japan National Railways on 1 April 1987, the station was transferred to JR Kyushu. On 13 March 2004, with the opening of the Kyushu Shinkansen, the station was transferred to the Hisatsu Orange Railway.

== Passenger statistics ==
The average daily passenger traffic in fiscal 2019 was 13 people.

== Surrounding area ==
- National Route 3
- Akune City Okawa Elementary School
- Akune City Hall Okawa Branch Office

== See also ==
- List of railway stations in Japan
