= Origuchi Station =

Railway station in Akune, Kagoshima Prefecture, Japan

Origuchi Station: 折口駅; おりぐち
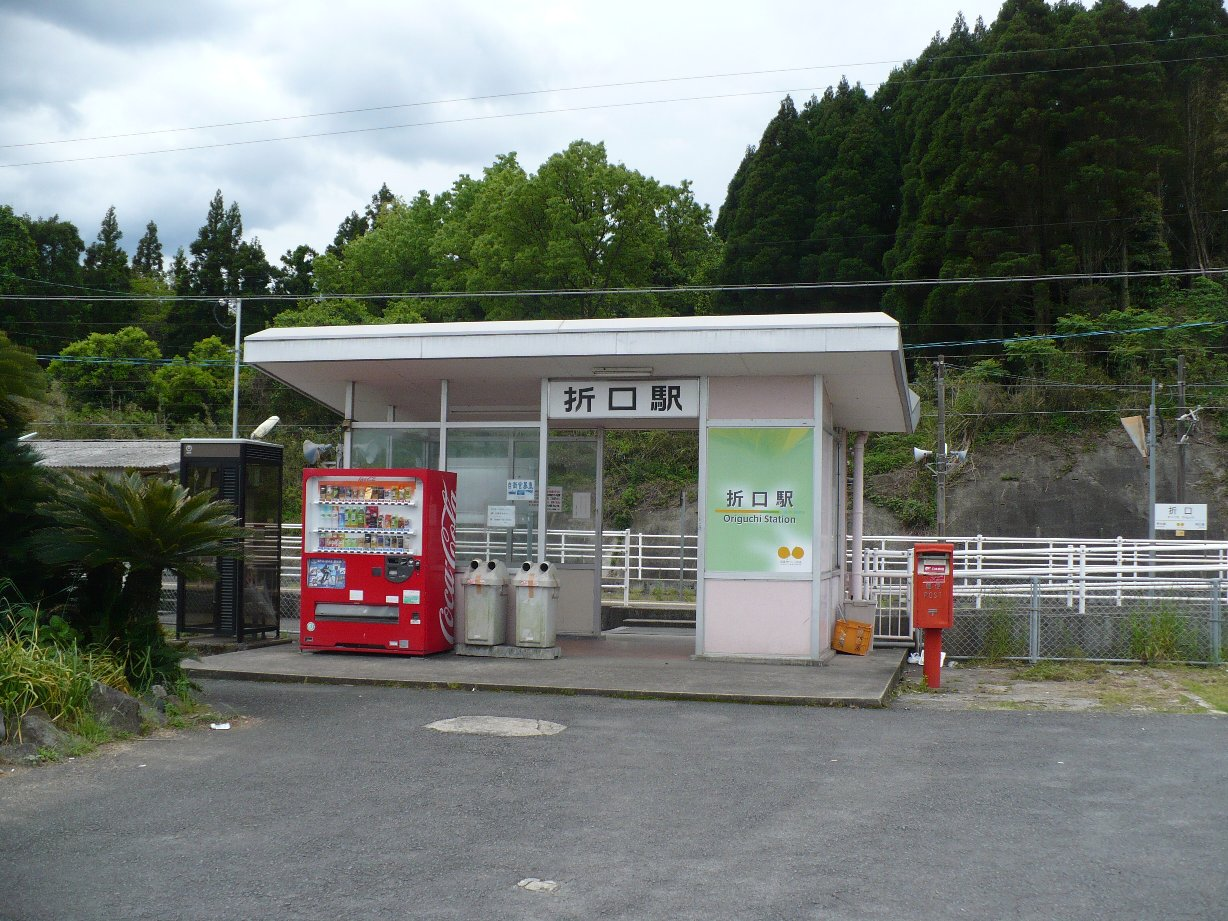
- Origuchi station building in 2006

General information
- Location: Origuchi, Akune-shi, Kagoshima-ken 899-1601; Japan
- Coordinates: 32.0610341°N 130.2176289°E
- Operator: Hisatsu Orange Railway Co., Ltd.
- Line: Hisatsu Orange Railway
- Distance: 80.7 km from Yatsushiro; 5.4 km from Nodagou
- Platforms: 2 side platforms
- Tracks: 3

Construction
- Structure type: At-grade

Other information
- Website: Official website (in Japanese)

History
- Opened: 25 March 1923
- Original company: Japanese Government Railways
Location
- Location within Kagoshima Prefecture Location within Japan

Origuchi Station (折口駅, Origuchi-eki) is a passenger railway station located in the city of Akune, Kagoshima Prefecture, Japan. It is operated by third-sector railway company Hisatsu Orange Railway.

== Lines ==
The station is served by the Hisatsu Orange Railway Line that follows the former coastal route of the JR Kyushu Kagoshima Main Line connecting Yatsushiro and Sendai. It is located 80.7 km from the starting point of the line at Yatsushiro.

== Station layout ==
The station is an above-ground station with two side platforms and three tracks, connected by a footbridge. It is an unstaffed station. There used to be a wooden station building with a large waiting room, but it was demolished in 1980 and replaced with a simple station building, and the waiting room next to the station building was also demolished around 1990.

=== Platforms ===
1	■ ■ Hisatsu Orange Railway	for Izumi, Minamata, and Yatsushiro
1	■ ■Hisatsu Orange Railway	for Akune and Sendai

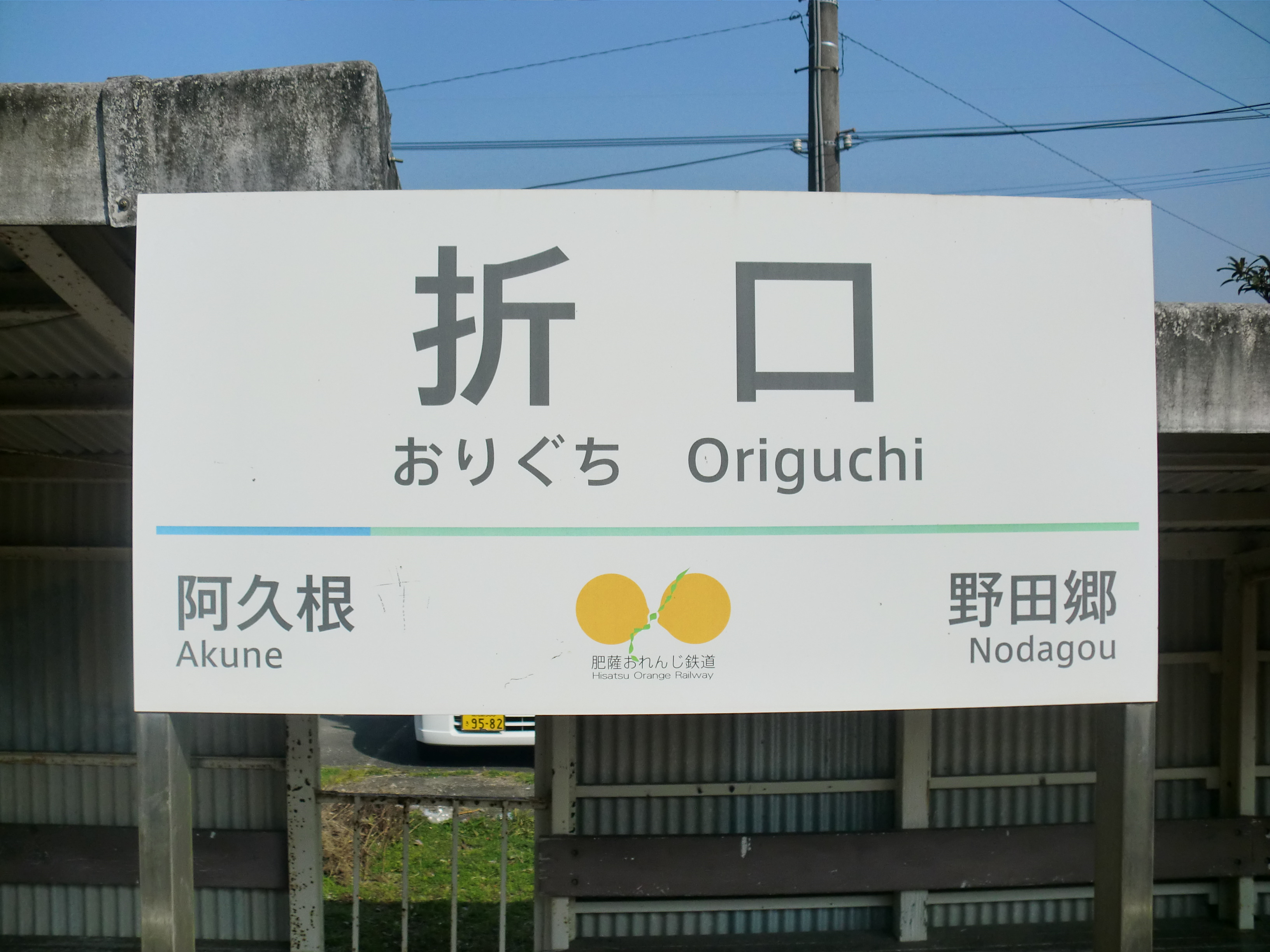
Station sign

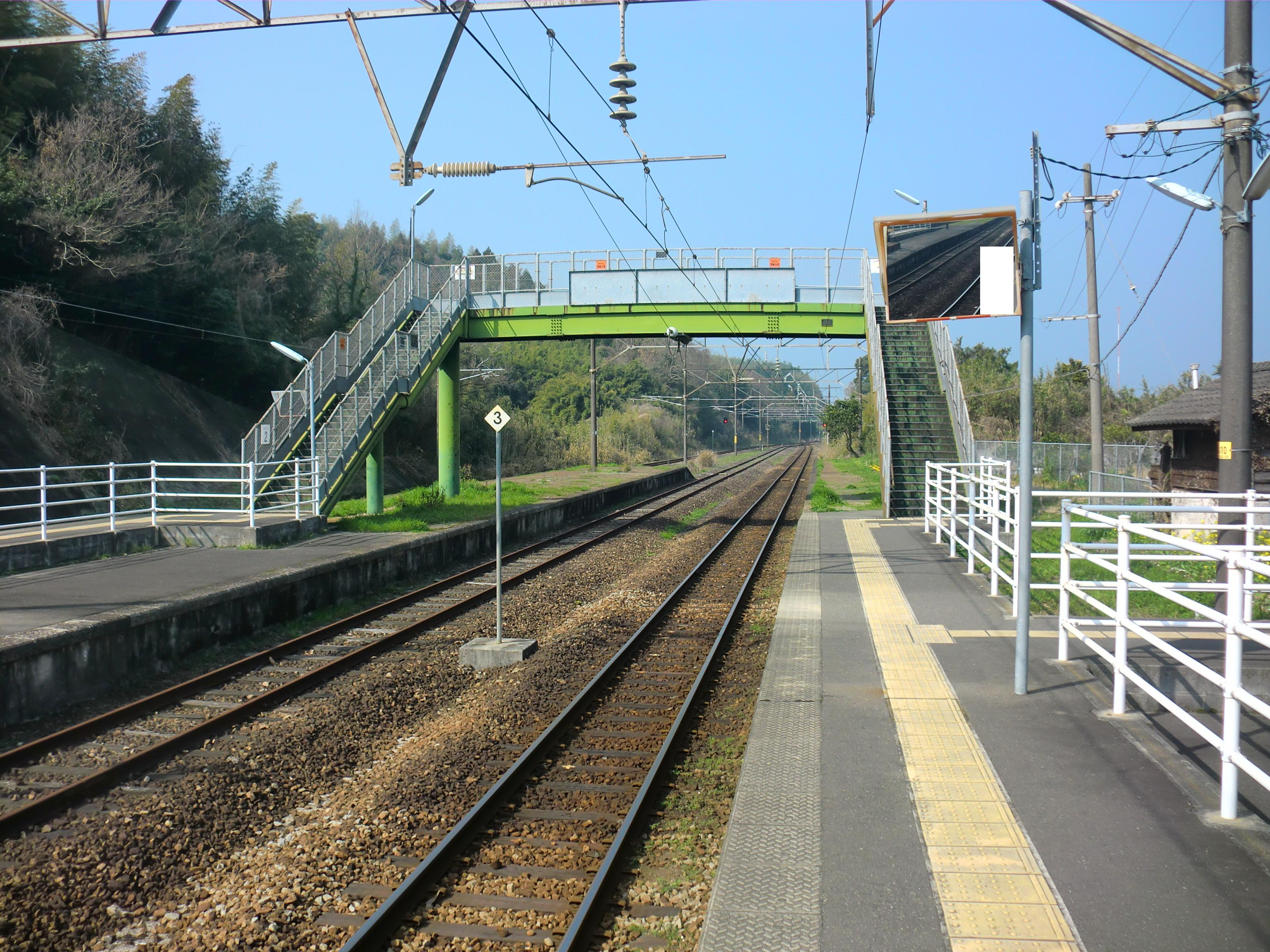
View of station platforms

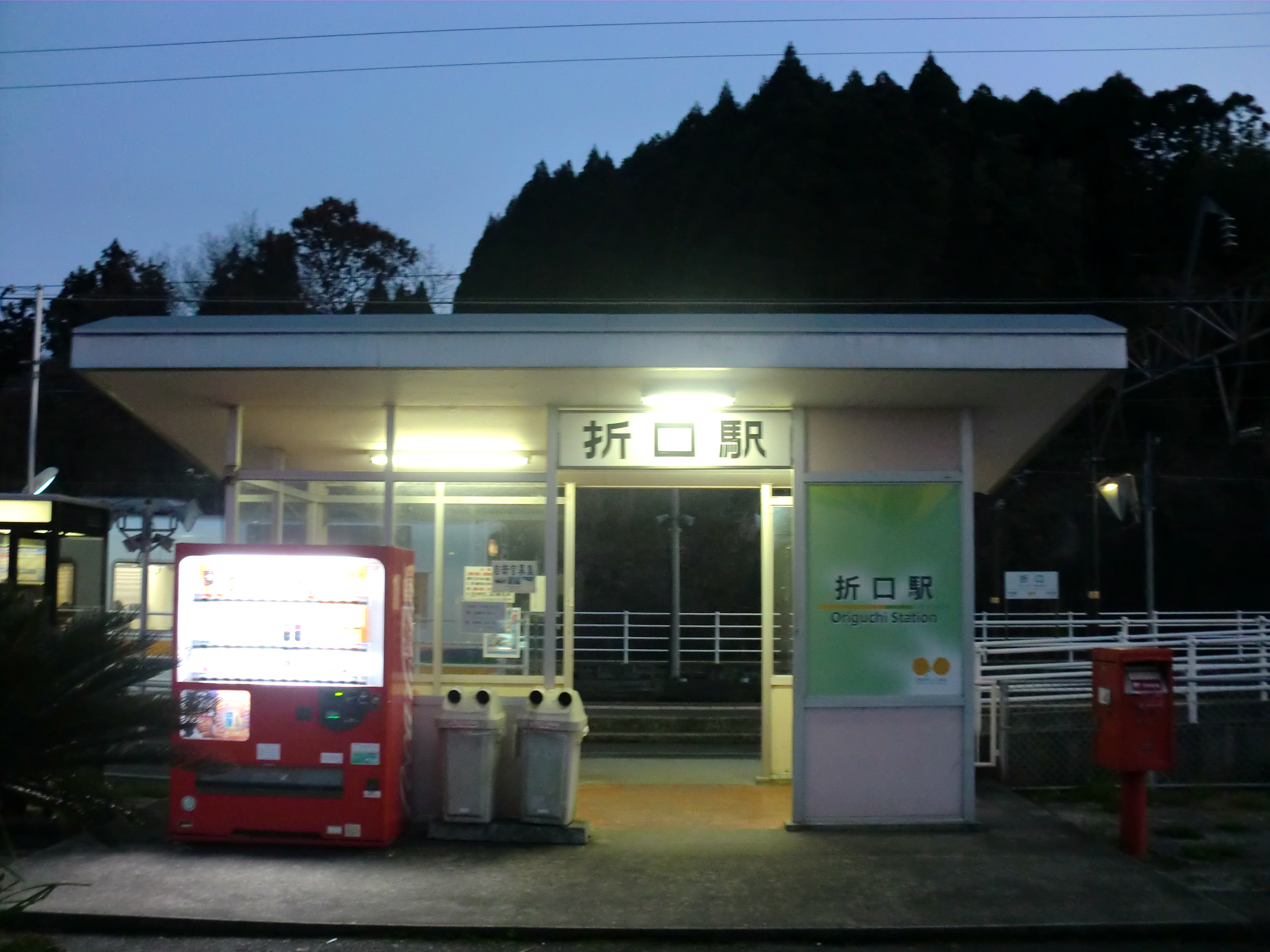
Building at night

== Adjacent stations ==
«	Service	»
Hisatsu Orange Railway Line
Nodagou	–	Akune
Rapid Express Ocean Liner Satsuma: Does not stop at this station

== History ==
Origuchi Station was opened on 25 March 1923 as a station on the Japanese Government Railways Sendai Line, which was incorporated into the Kagoshima Main Line on 17 October 1927. With the privatization of the Japan National Railways on 1 April 1987, the station was transferred to JR Kyushu. On 13 March 2004, with the opening of the Kyushu Shinkansen, the station was transferred to the Hisatsu Orange Railway.

== Passenger statistics ==
The average daily passenger traffic in fiscal 2019 was 201 people.

== Surrounding area ==
- National Route 3
- Akune City Orita Elementary School

== See also ==
- List of railway stations in Japan
