= Akune =

Akune 阿久根市
- City
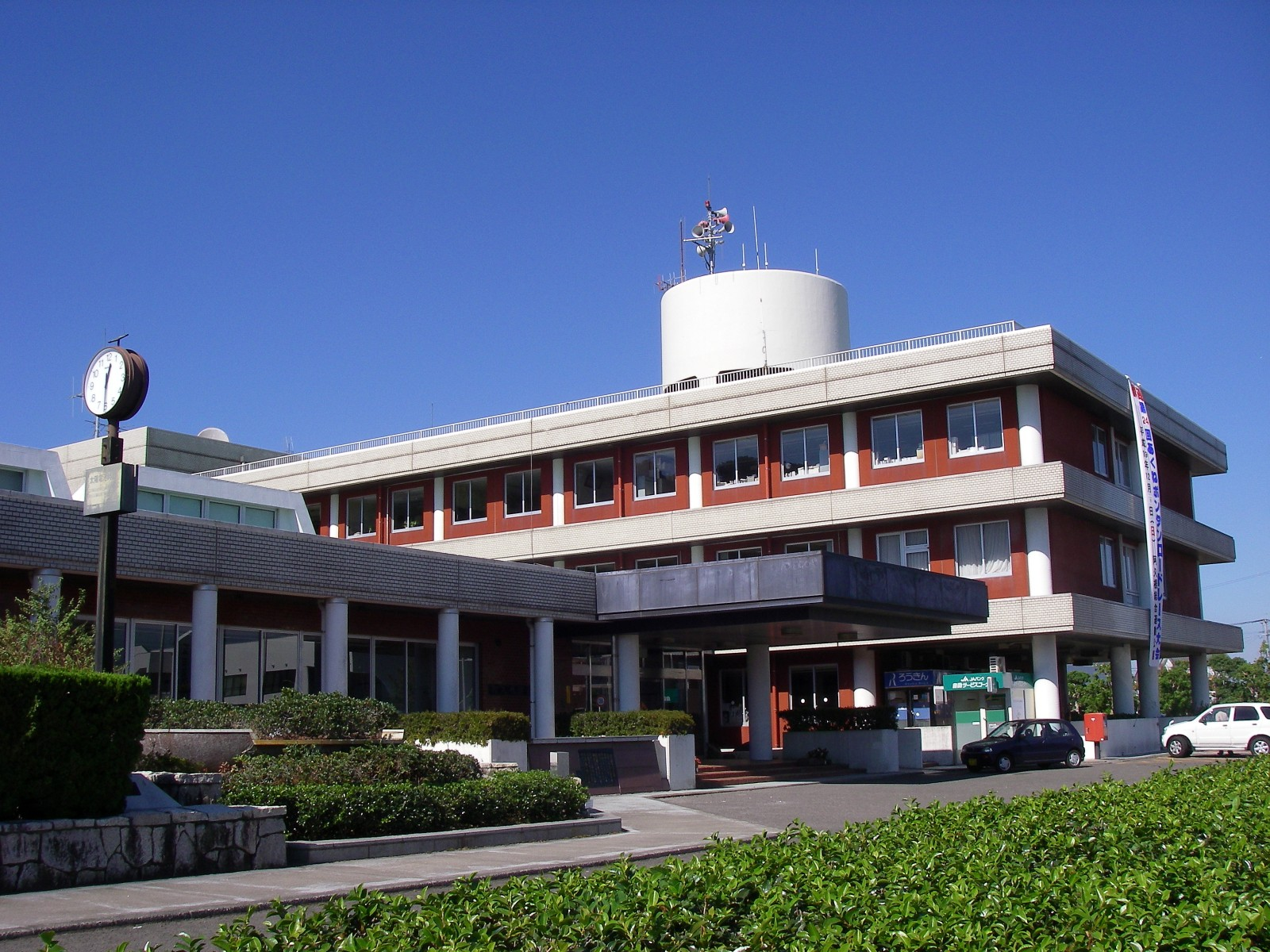
- Akune City Hall

- Flag Emblem
- Interactive map of Akune
- Location in Japan
- Coordinates: 32°00′52″N 130°11′34″E
- Country: Japan
- Region: Kyushu
- Prefecture: Kagoshima

Government
  - Mayor: Yoshimasa Nishihira (since January 2011)

Area
  - Total: 134.28 km^{2} (51.85 sq mi)

Population (June 30, 2024)
  - Total: 18,297
  - Density: 136.26/km^{2} (352.91/sq mi)
- Time zone: UTC+09:00 (JST)
- City hall address: 200 Tsurumichō, Akune-shi, Kagoshima-ken 899-1696
- Climate: Cfa
- Website: Official website
- Symbols
- Flower: Tsuwabuki (Asteraceae farfugium japonicum)
- Tree: Pomelo

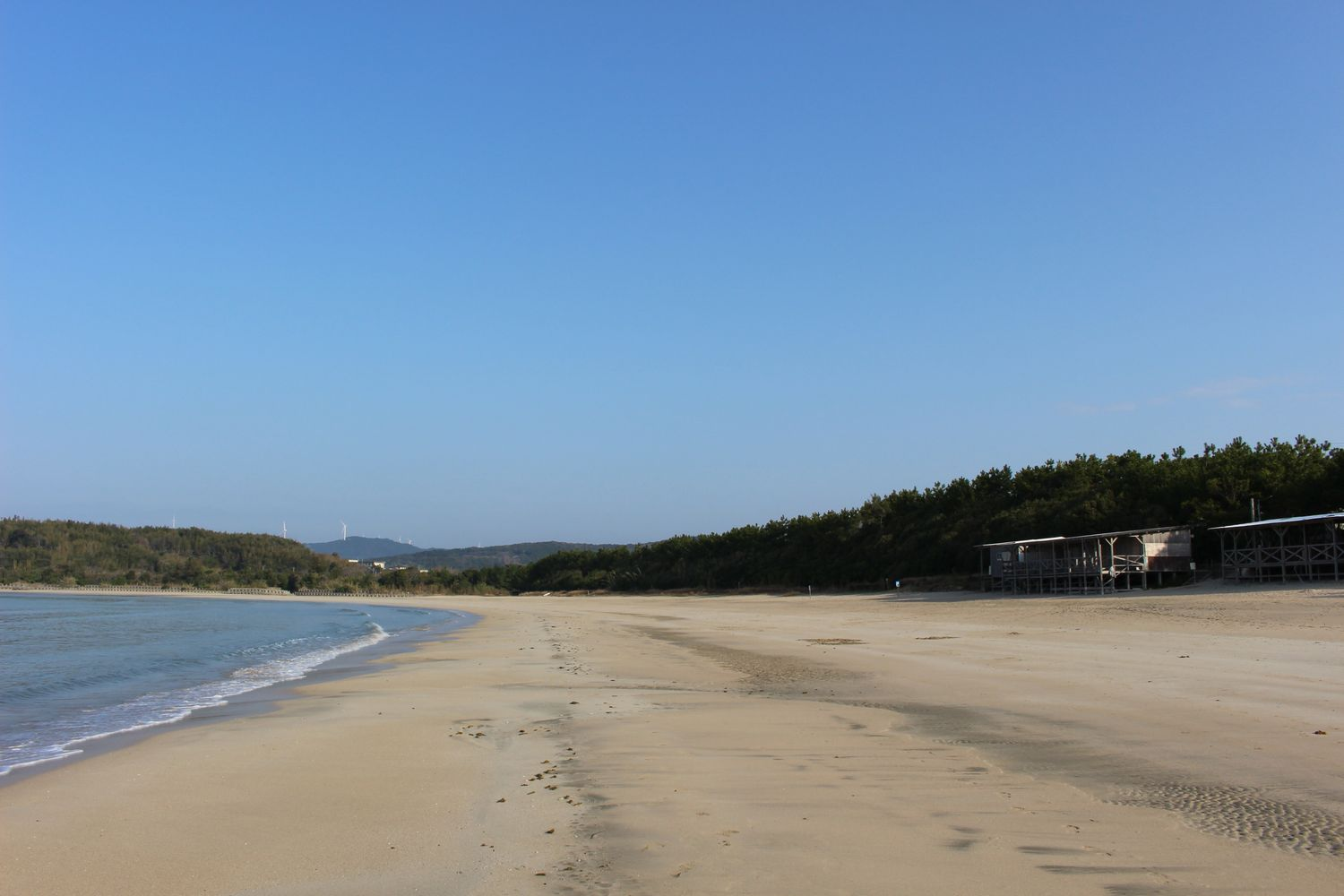
Wakimoto beach

Akune (阿久根市, Akune-shi; Japanese pronunciation: [ä̀.kɯ̈́.né̞(.ɕì)]) is a city located in Kagoshima Prefecture, Japan. As of 29 February 2024, the city had an estimated population of 18,297 in 9698 households, and a population density of 140 persons per km^{2}. The total area of the city is 134.28 km^{2} (51.85 sq mi).

== Geography ==
Akune is located in northwestern Kagoshima. The west side of the city faces the East China Sea (Amakusa Bay), and is dotted with islands such as Oshima and Kuwajima. The urban center at the mouth of the Takamatsu River is flat, but the rest of the city is made up of forests and hills. The northwest side of the city faces Nagashima Island, the southernmost of the Amakusa Islands, across the Kuronoseto Strait, and is connected by the Kuronoseto Bridge.

=== Neighboring municipalities ===
Kagoshima Prefecture

- Izumi
- Nagashima
- Satsumasendai

=== Climate ===
Akune has a humid subtropical climate (Köppen climate classification Cfa) with hot summers and mild winters. Precipitation is significant throughout the year, and is heavier in summer, especially the months of June and July. The highest temperature ever recorded in Akune was 37.1 °C (98.8 °F) on 13 August 2018, the coldest temperature ever recorded was −4.6 °C (23.7 °F) on 26 February 1981.

Climate data for Akune (1991−2020 normals, extremes 1939−present)
Month	Jan	Feb	Mar	Apr	May	Jun	Jul	Aug	Sep	Oct	Nov	Dec	Year
Record high °C (°F)	23.5 (74.3)	24.0 (75.2)	25.6 (78.1)	27.8 (82.0)	31.4 (88.5)	33.6 (92.5)	36.6 (97.9)	37.1 (98.8)	35.8 (96.4)	32.7 (90.9)	28.0 (82.4)	23.7 (74.7)	37.1 (98.8)
Mean maximum °C (°F)	18.2 (64.8)	19.7 (67.5)	22.2 (72.0)	25.1 (77.2)	28.2 (82.8)	30.3 (86.5)	33.4 (92.1)	34.5 (94.1)	32.4 (90.3)	29.1 (84.4)	24.5 (76.1)	20.2 (68.4)	34.9 (94.8)
Mean daily maximum °C (°F)	11.4 (52.5)	12.6 (54.7)	15.6 (60.1)	19.8 (67.6)	23.6 (74.5)	26.0 (78.8)	29.8 (85.6)	31.2 (88.2)	28.6 (83.5)	24.2 (75.6)	18.9 (66.0)	13.7 (56.7)	21.3 (70.3)
Daily mean °C (°F)	7.9 (46.2)	8.8 (47.8)	11.6 (52.9)	15.7 (60.3)	19.5 (67.1)	22.7 (72.9)	26.5 (79.7)	27.4 (81.3)	24.6 (76.3)	20.0 (68.0)	15.0 (59.0)	10.0 (50.0)	17.5 (63.5)
Mean daily minimum °C (°F)	4.6 (40.3)	5.1 (41.2)	7.6 (45.7)	11.7 (53.1)	15.7 (60.3)	19.9 (67.8)	23.9 (75.0)	24.4 (75.9)	21.5 (70.7)	16.5 (61.7)	11.5 (52.7)	6.6 (43.9)	14.1 (57.4)
Mean minimum °C (°F)	0.0 (32.0)	0.3 (32.5)	2.2 (36.0)	6.0 (42.8)	11.2 (52.2)	15.9 (60.6)	20.7 (69.3)	21.5 (70.7)	17.0 (62.6)	11.3 (52.3)	5.8 (42.4)	1.3 (34.3)	−0.7 (30.7)
Record low °C (°F)	−4.2 (24.4)	−4.6 (23.7)	−1.6 (29.1)	0.9 (33.6)	6.9 (44.4)	11.2 (52.2)	17.1 (62.8)	18.5 (65.3)	12.0 (53.6)	5.4 (41.7)	0.3 (32.5)	−2.3 (27.9)	−4.6 (23.7)
Average precipitation mm (inches)	76.7 (3.02)	102.7 (4.04)	134.8 (5.31)	161.8 (6.37)	188.1 (7.41)	457.4 (18.01)	377.3 (14.85)	222.8 (8.77)	225.9 (8.89)	93.7 (3.69)	104.0 (4.09)	91.5 (3.60)	2,236.7 (88.06)
Average snowfall cm (inches)	trace	1 (0.4)	0 (0)	0 (0)	0 (0)	0 (0)	0 (0)	0 (0)	0 (0)	0 (0)	0 (0)	0 (0)	1 (0.4)
Average precipitation days (≥ 1.0 mm)	9.1	9.3	11.1	9.8	9.3	14.8	10.9	10.3	9.4	6.6	8.6	8.7	117.9
Average snowy days (≥ 1 cm)	0.3	0.3	0	0	0	0	0	0	0	0	0	0	0.6
Average relative humidity (%)	68	68	69	72	77	85	84	80	78	72	71	68	74
Mean monthly sunshine hours	107.0	122.9	161.5	180.4	185.9	124.0	201.6	226.8	186.9	186.6	145.8	118.7	1,948.4
Source: Japan Meteorological Agency

== Demographics ==
Per Japanese census data, the population of Akune in 2020 is 19,270 people. Akune's population has been slowly declining since the census began in 1950. The population in 2020 is less than 50% of what it was in the 1950s.

Historical population

Year	Pop.	±%
1950	41,344	—
1955	41,180	−0.4%
1960	38,908	−5.5%
1965	36,026	−7.4%
1970	32,390	−10.1%
1975	30,295	−6.5%
1980	29,527	−2.5%
1985	29,185	−1.2%

Year	Pop.	±%
1990	27,869	−4.5%
1995	27,506	−1.3%
2000	26,270	−4.5%
2005	25,072	−4.6%
2010	23,151	−7.7%
2015	21,198	−8.4%
2020	19,270	−9.1%

Akune population statistics

== History ==
Akune is part of ancient Satsuma Province. "The place name Akune" has existed since ancient times. "Aku" means fish or fishing, and "ne" means reef. In the Heian period it was a shōen manor called Akune-in. In the Muromachi period, it came under the control of the Shimazu clan and was part of Satsuma Domain in the Edo Period. The village of Akune was established on April 1, 1889 with the creation of the modern municipalities system. It was raised to town status on January 1, 1925 and to city status on April 1, 1952. On April 10, 1955 Akune annexed the town of Mikasa.

== Government ==
Akune has a mayor-council form of government with a directly elected mayor and a unicameral city council of 15 members. Akune, together with the town of Nagashima contributes one member to the Kagoshima Prefectural Assembly. In terms of national politics, the city is part of the Kagoshima 3rd district of the lower house of the Diet of Japan.

== Economy ==
The main economy activity of Akune is agriculture and commercial fishing.

== Education ==
Akune has eight public elementary schools and three public junior high schools by the city government, and one public high school operated by the Kagoshima Prefectural Board of Education.

== Transportation ==
=== Railways ===
Hisatsu Orange Railway

- Origuchi - Akune - Ushinohama - Satsuma Ohkawa

=== Highways ===
- Minamikyushu Expressway
- National Route 3
- National Route 389
- National Route 499

== Noted people from Akune ==
- Kōsaku Yamashita, movie director
