= Ushinohama Station =

Railway station in Akune, Kagoshima Prefecture, Japan

Ushinohama Station: 牛ノ浜駅; うしのはま
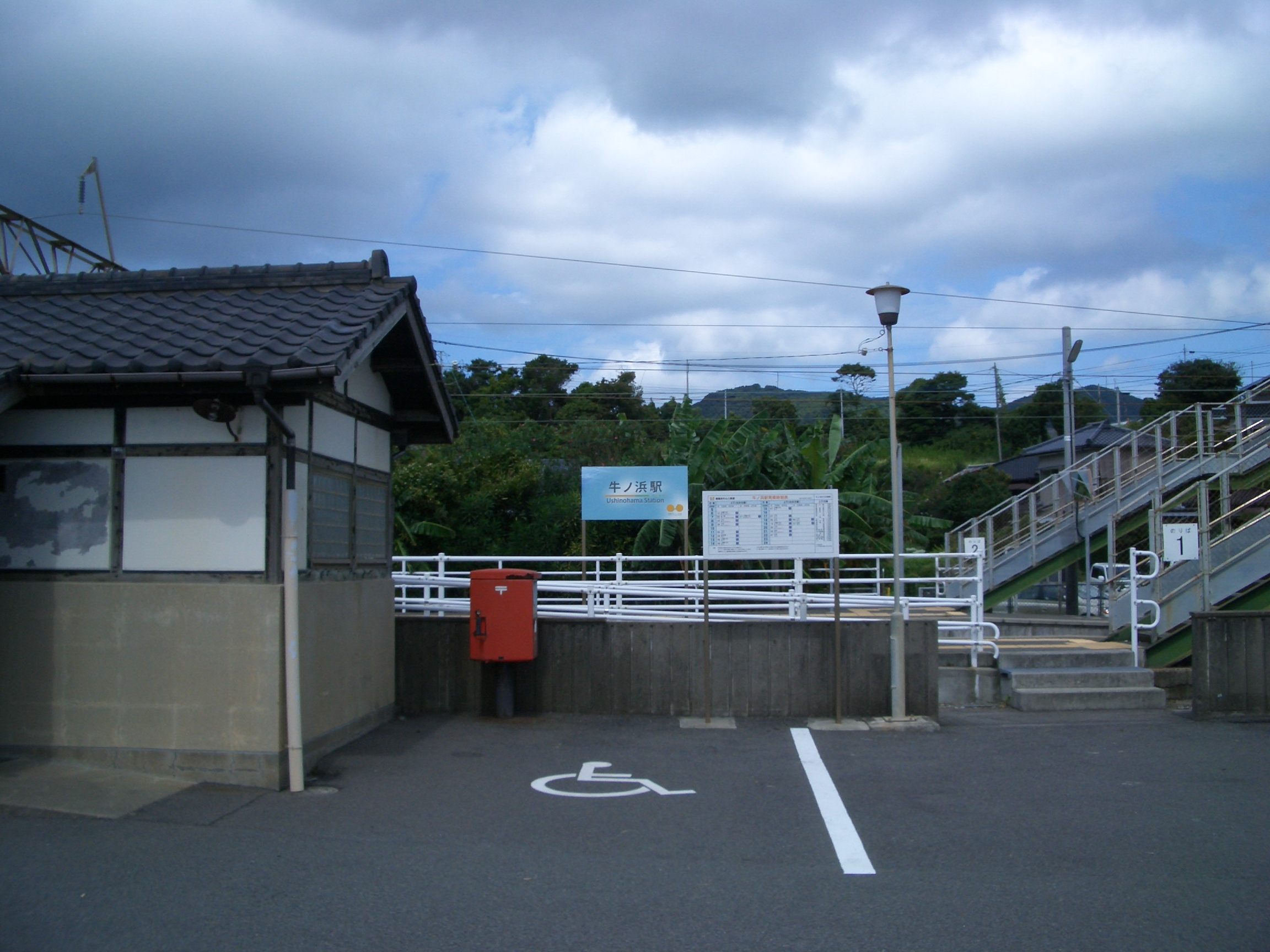
- Station building and overpass in 2007

General information
- Location: Okawa, Akune-shi, Kagoshima-ken 899-1741; Japan
- Coordinates: 31.9742794°N 130.2068384°E
- Operator: Hisatsu Orange Railway Co., Ltd.
- Line: Hisatsu Orange Railway
- Distance: 92.2 km from Yatsushiro; 6.0 km from Akune
- Platforms: 2 side platforms
- Tracks: 2

Construction
- Structure type: At-grade

Other information
- Website: Official website (in Japanese)

History
- Opened: 15 October 1922
- Original company: Japanese Government Railways
Location
- Location within Kagoshima Prefecture Location within Japan

Ushinohama Station (牛ノ浜駅, Ushinohama-eki) is a passenger railway station located in the city of Akune, Kagoshima Prefecture, Japan. It is served by the third-sector railway company Hisatsu Orange Railway.

== Lines ==
The station is served by the Hisatsu Orange Railway Line that follows the former coastal route of the JR Kyushu Kagoshima Main Line connecting Yatsushiro and Sendai. It is located 92.2 km from the starting point of the line at Yatsushiro.

== Station layout ==
The station consists of two side platforms at street level connected by a footbridge. During the JNR era, the station was staffed and a single-story wooden station building stood where "Mensho Fukunaga" currently stands, and a freight siding and freight platform were located in what is now the vacant lot on the seaward side of Yatsushiro to handle cargo such as seafood and vegetables. However, the station became unattended in 1970, and the freight siding and freight platform were removed, and the station building was demolished around 1985. In 1987, a udon and soba restaurant operated directly by JR Kyushu, called "Makuragicaya," was built on the site of the former station building, but it closed down when the two companies separated in March 2004. After that, the former store site was occupied by "Mensho Fukunaga Ushinohama Branch" in April 2004, but it also closed on May 31, 2015 due to the deterioration of the store. It was demolished and removed in April 2016, leaving the site vacant.

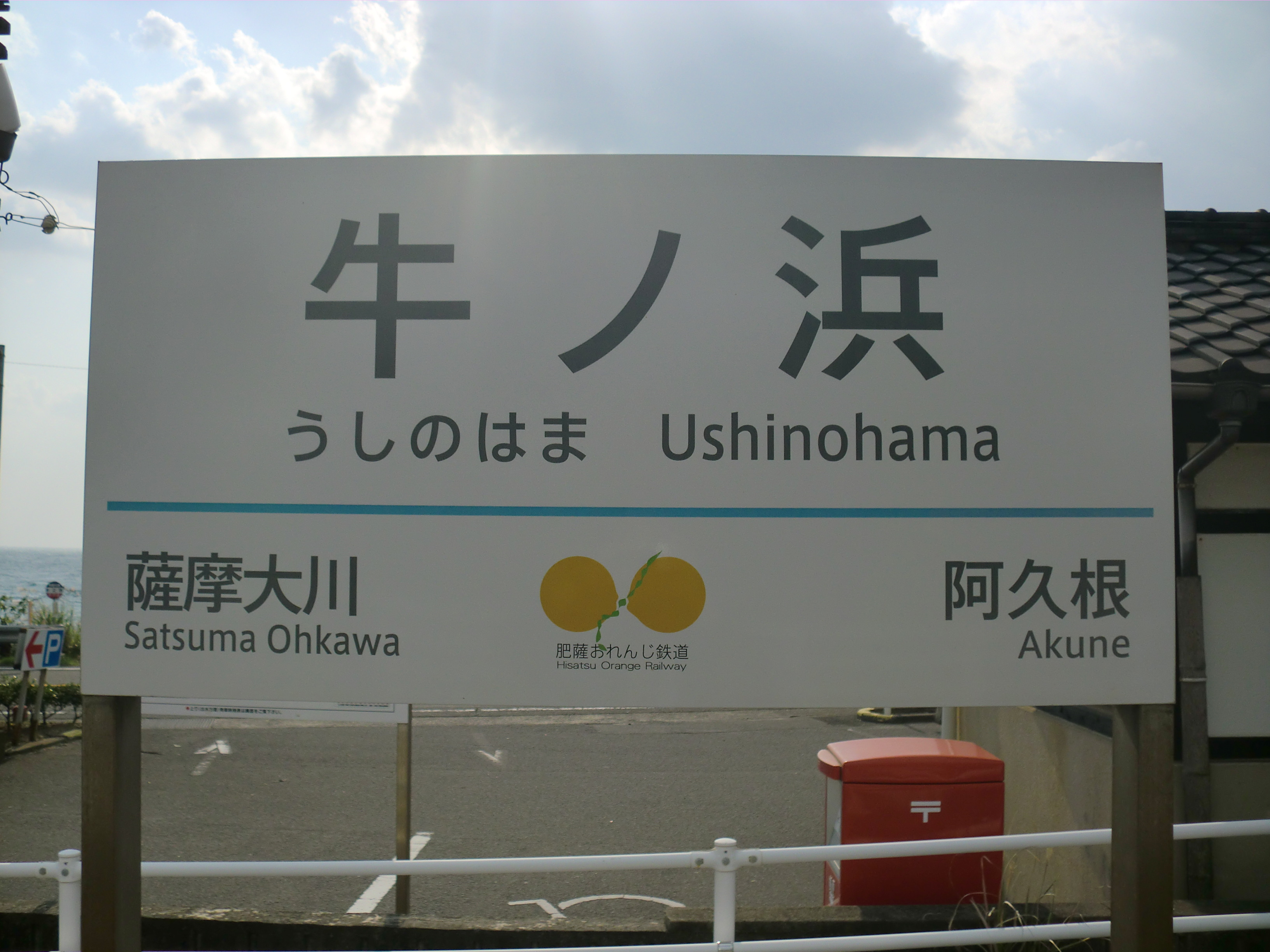
Station sign

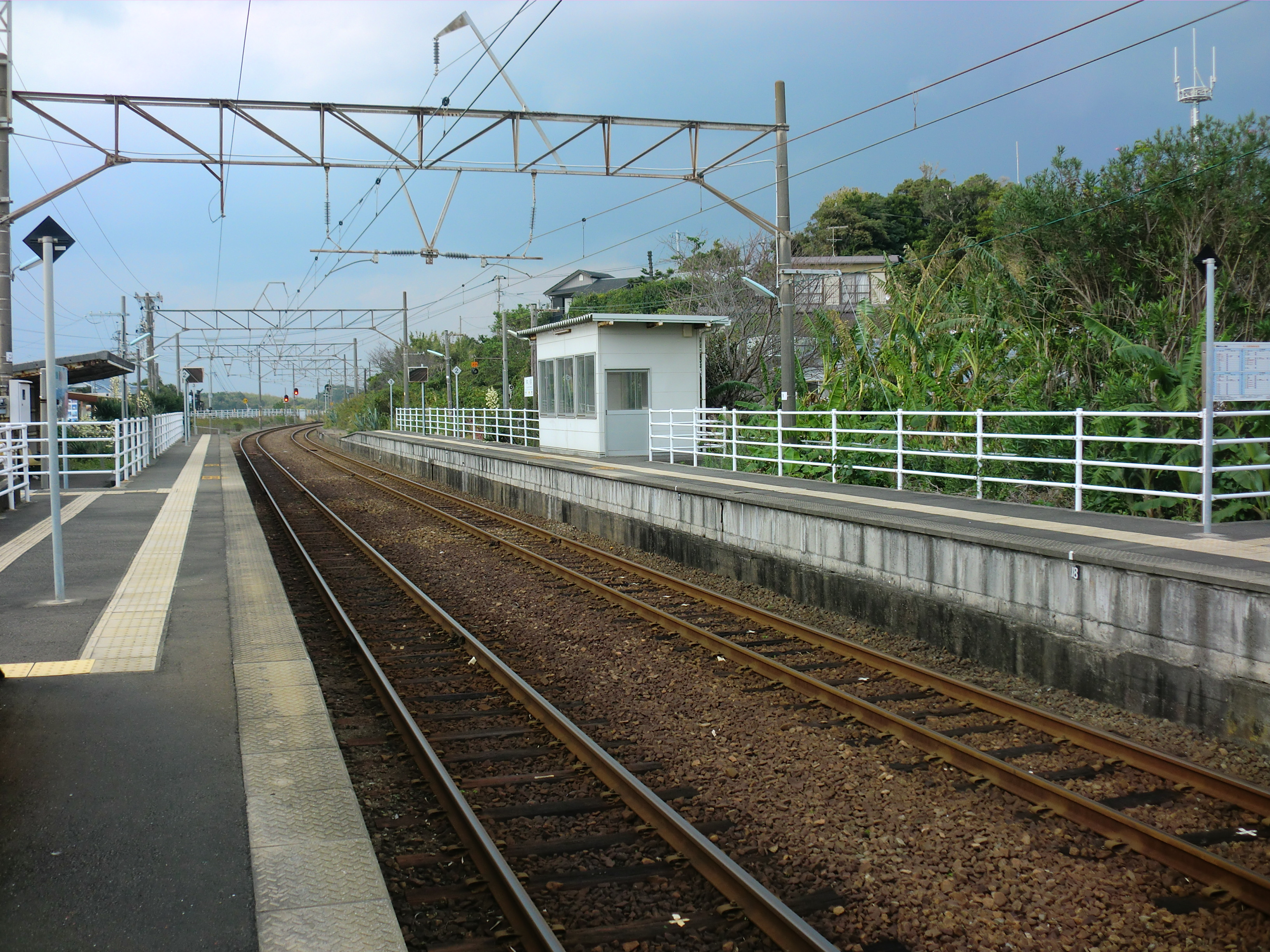
View of station platforms

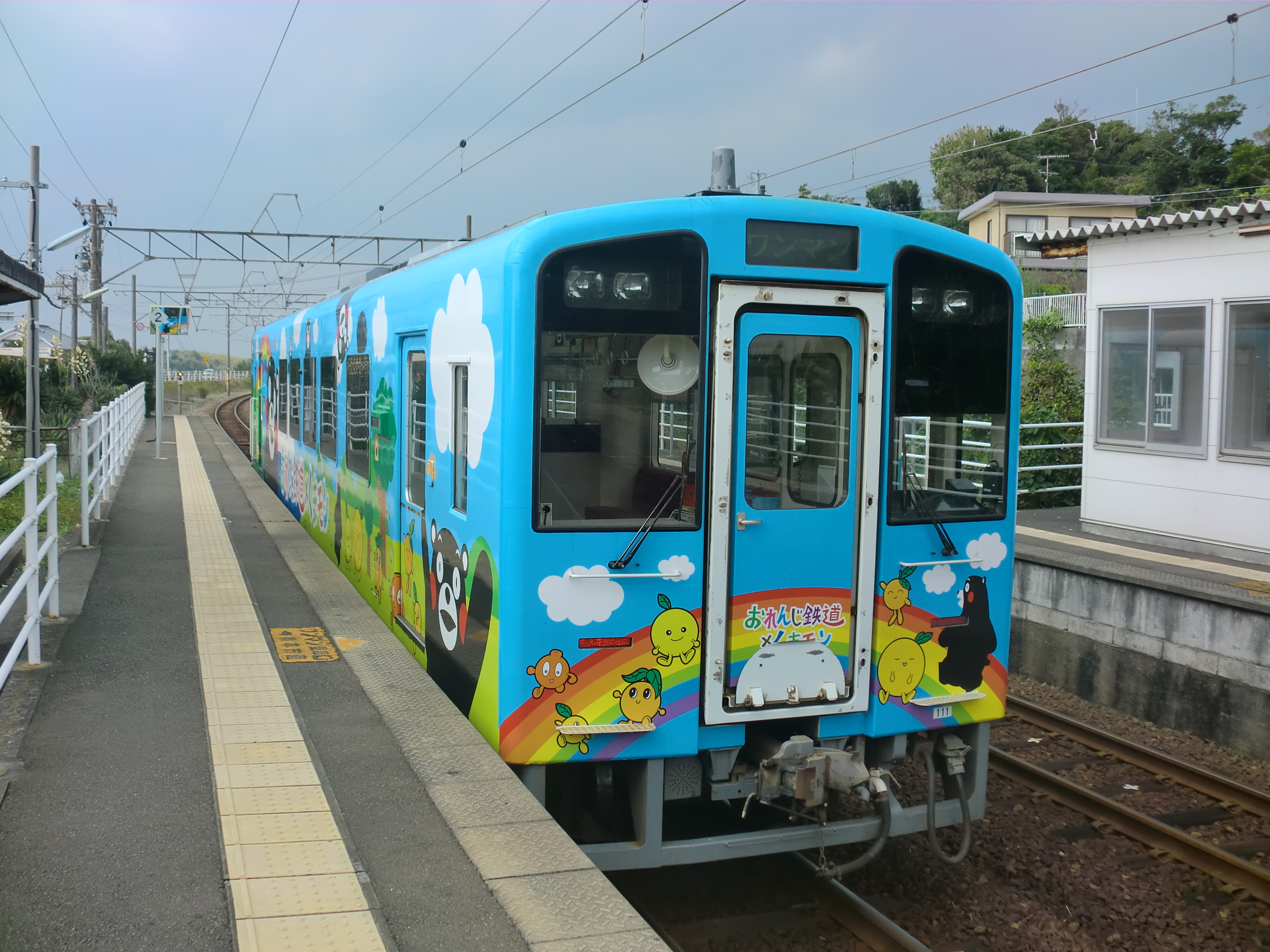
Series 100 train at platform

== Adjacent stations ==
«	Service	»
Hisatsu Orange Railway Line
Akune	–	Satsuma Ohkawa
Rapid Express Ocean Liner Satsuma: Does not stop at this station

== History ==
Ushinohama Station was opened on 15 October 1922 as a station on the Japanese Government Railways Sendai Line, which was incorporated into the Kagoshima Main Line on 17 October 1927. With the privatization of the Japan National Railways on 1 April 1987, the station was transferred to JR Kyushu. On 13 March 2004, with the opening of the Kyushu Shinkansen, the station was transferred to the Hisatsu Orange Railway.

== Passenger statistics ==
The average daily passenger traffic in fiscal 2019 was 28 people.

== Surrounding area ==
The station premises are adjacent to the East China Sea (Ushinohama Scenic Area), and the view from the station is the whole of Ushinohama, and the site has been regarded as scenic location since the period of the Japanese National Railways.

- National Route 3

== See also ==
- List of railway stations in Japan
