= Akune Station =

Railway station in Akune, Kagoshima Prefecture, Japan

Akune Station: 阿久根駅; あくね
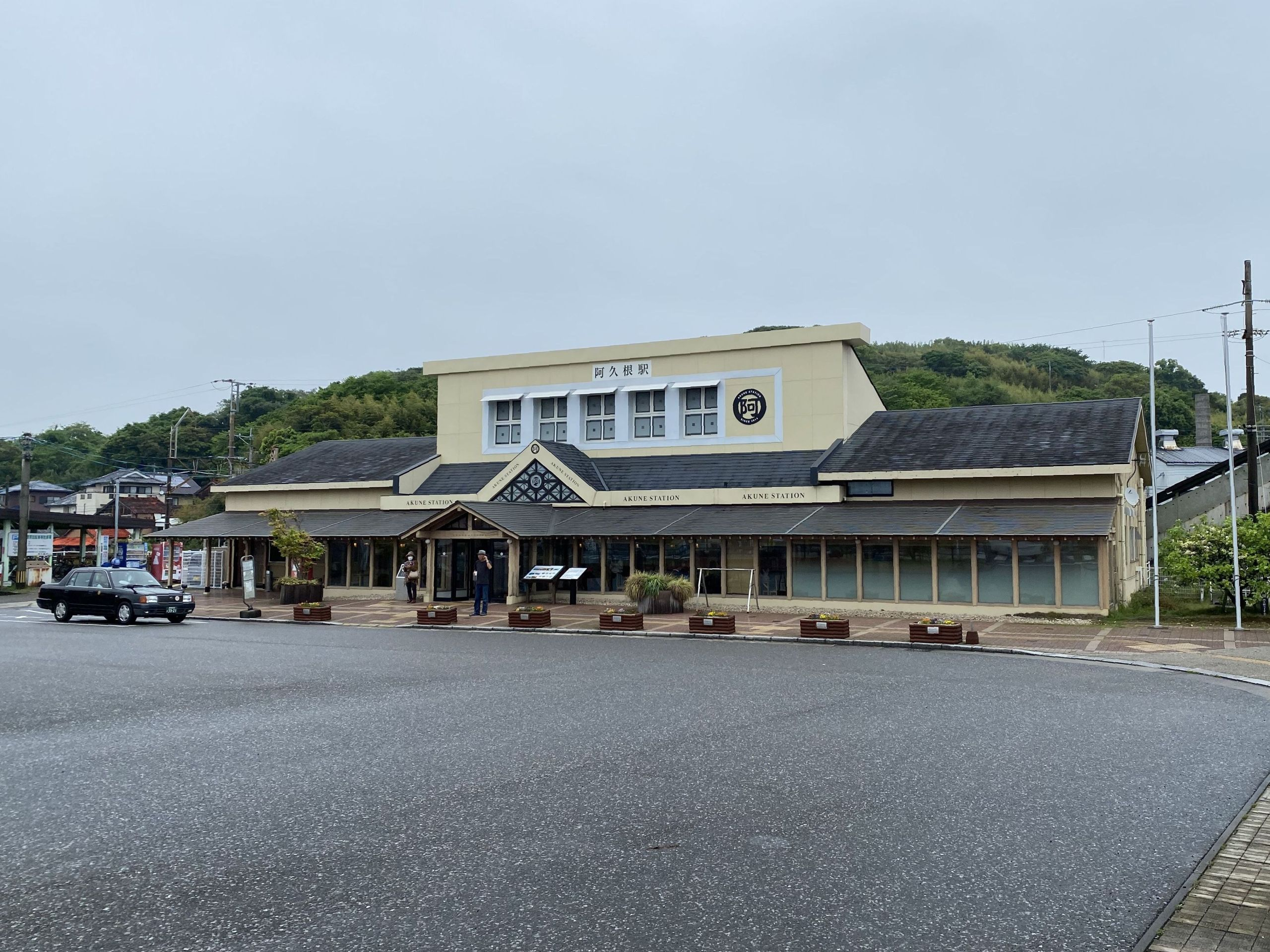
- Station building

General information
- Location: Sakaemachi, Akune-shi, Kagoshima-ken 899-1616; Japan
- Coordinates: 32.0231100°N 130.1961777°E
- Operator: Hisatsu Orange Railway Co., Ltd.
- Line: Hisatsu Orange Railway
- Distance: 86.2 km from Yatsushiro; 5.5 km from Origuchi
- Platforms: 2 side platforms
- Tracks: 2

Construction
- Structure type: At-grade

Other information
- Website: Official website (in Japanese)

History
- Opened: 15 October 1922
- Original company: Japanese Government Railways
Location
- Location within Kagoshima Prefecture Location within Japan

Akune Station (阿久根駅, Akune-eki) is a passenger railway station located in the city of Akune, Kagoshima Prefecture, Japan. It is served and operated by third-sector railway company Hisatsu Orange Railway.

== Lines ==
The station is served by the Hisatsu Orange Railway Line that follows the former coastal route of the JR Kyushu Kagoshima Main Line connecting Yatsushiro and Sendai. It is located 86.2 km from the starting point of the line at Yatsushiro.

== Station layout ==
The station is an above-ground station with two side platforms. Formerly, the station had one single platform and one island platform. Platform 3 and the siding were removed in 1987. After that, the entire track was removed, and the site was converted into a parking lot. When the station opened, it was a single-story wooden building, but it was burned down after being hit by a direct bomb during the Akune air raid in August 1945. The current station building is the second wooden building completed in 1949, and the front was renovated and further renovated in 2014. There are two sidings at the end behind platform 1, which are remnants of the former freight platform and are now used to store maintenance vehicles.

=== Platforms ===
| 1 | ■ ■ Hisatsu Orange Railway | for Izumi, Minamata, and Yatsushiro |
| 1 | ■ ■Hisatsu Orange Railway | for Sendai |

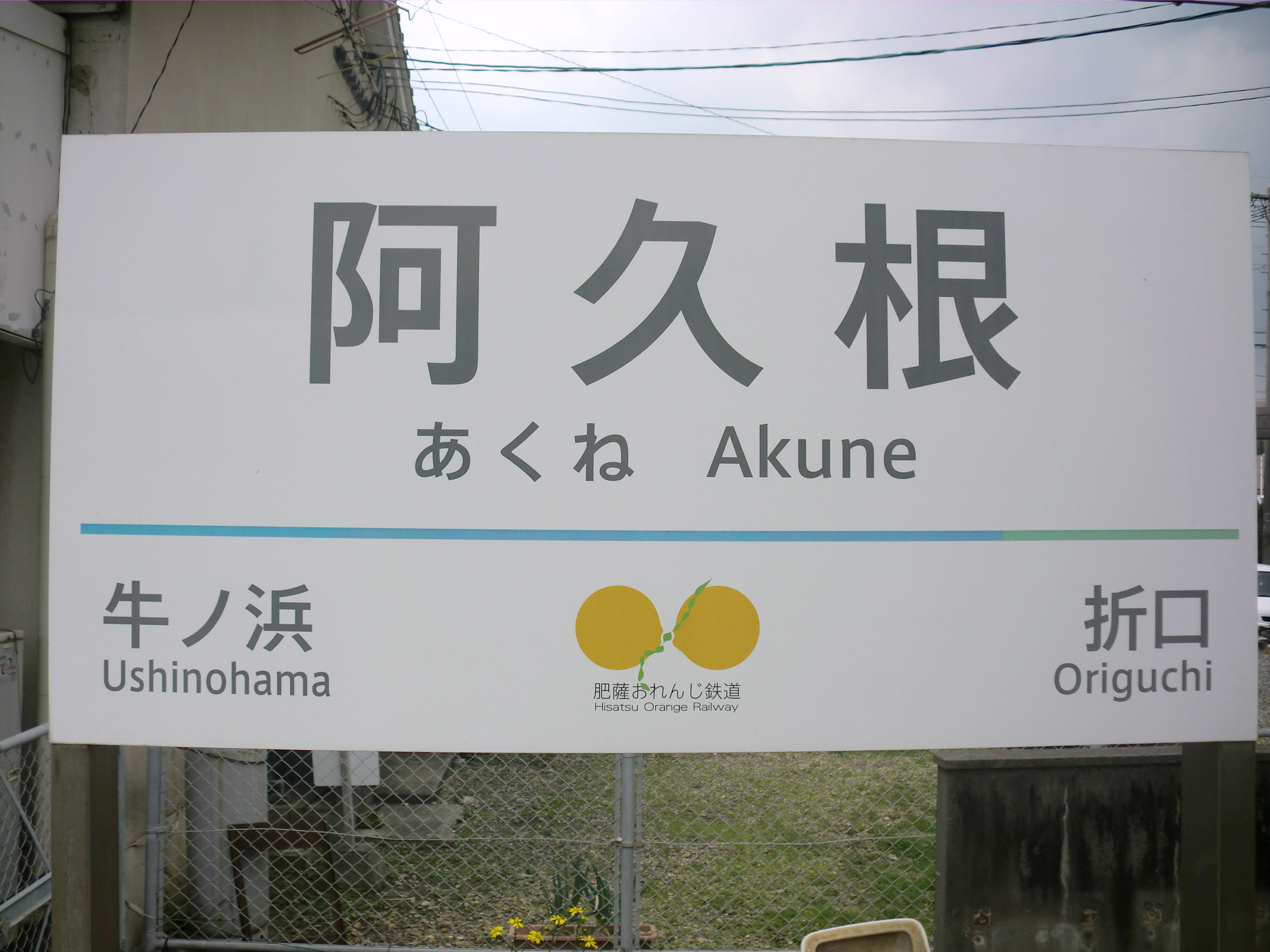
Station sign

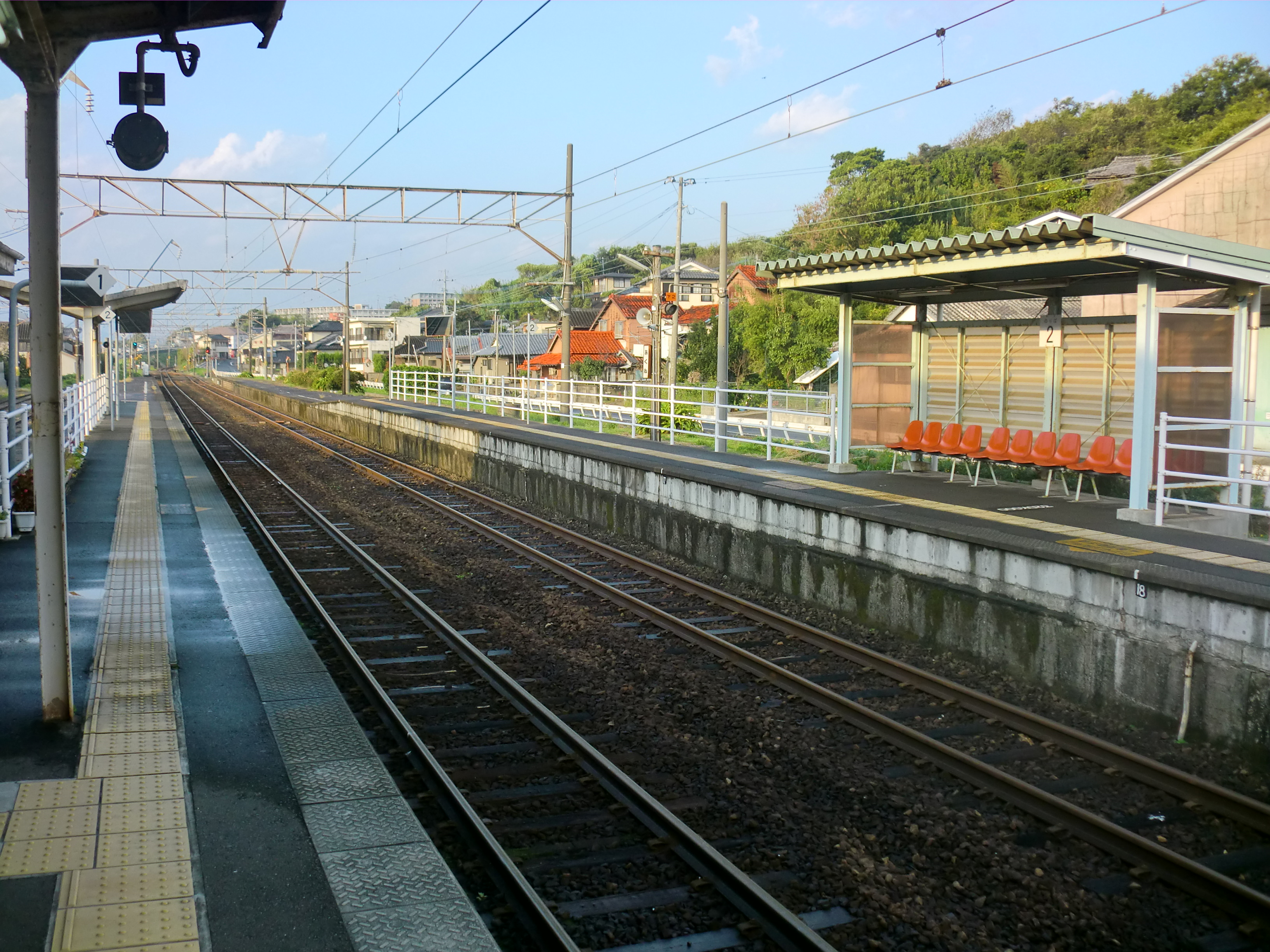
View of platforms

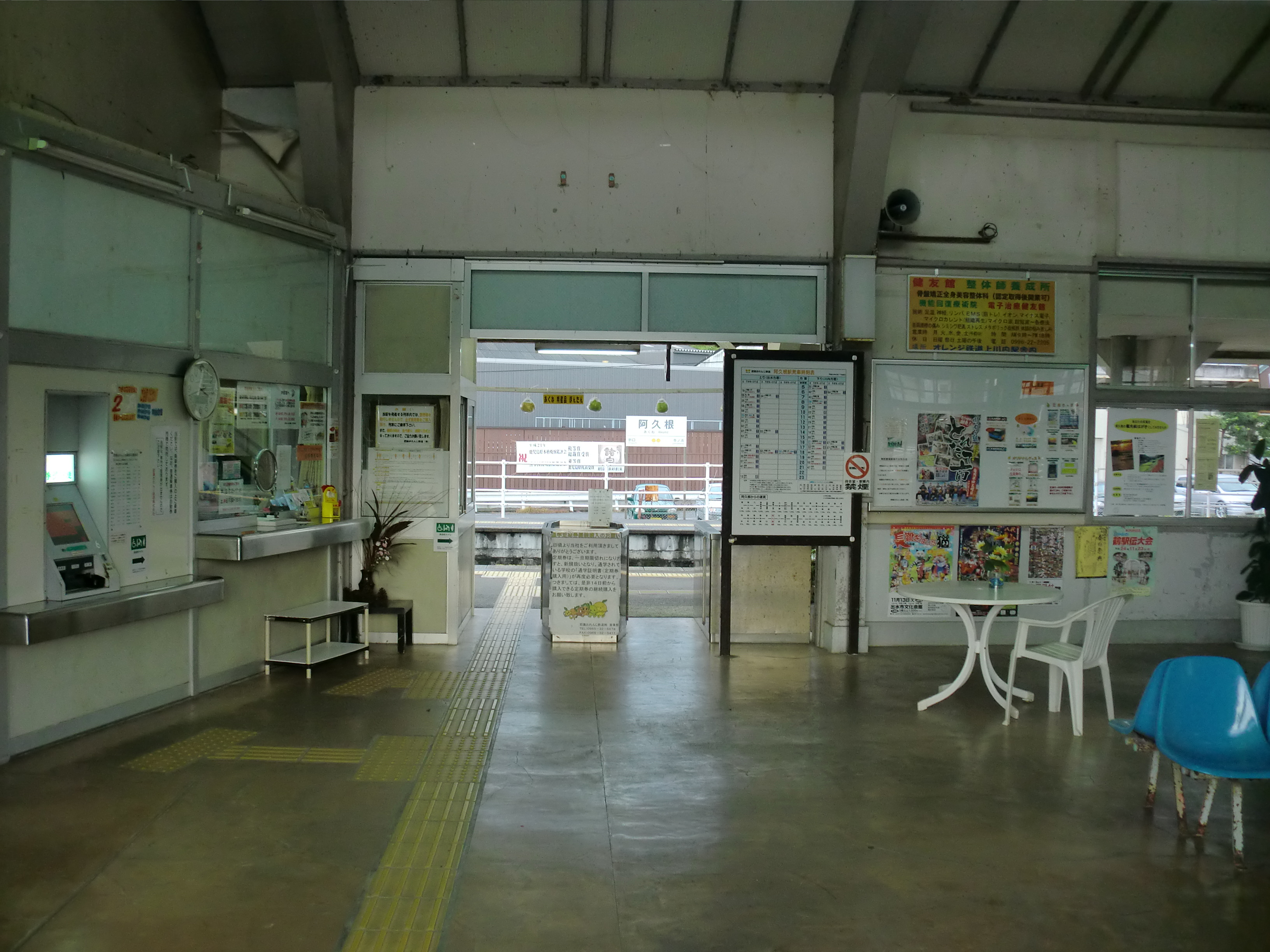
Station building with ticket machines

== Adjacent stations ==
| « | Service | » |
Hisatsu Orange Railway Line
| Origuchi | – | Ushinohama |
Rapid Express Ocean Liner Satsuma: Does not stop at this station

== History ==
Akune Station was opened on 15 October 1922 as a station on the Japanese Government Railways Sendai Line, which was incorporated into the Kagoshima Main Line on 17 October 1927. With the privatization of the Japan National Railways on 1 April 1987, the station was transferred to JR Kyushu. On 13 March 2004, with the opening of the Kyushu Shinkansen, the station was transferred to the Hisatsu Orange Railway.

== Passenger statistics ==
The average daily passenger traffic in fiscal 2019 was 574 people.

== Surrounding area ==
- Akune City Hall
- Akune City Akune Elementary School
- Akune Municipal Hospital

== See also ==
- List of railway stations in Japan
