= Junichi Inamoto =

Japanese footballer (born 1979)

Junichi Inamoto 稲本 潤一
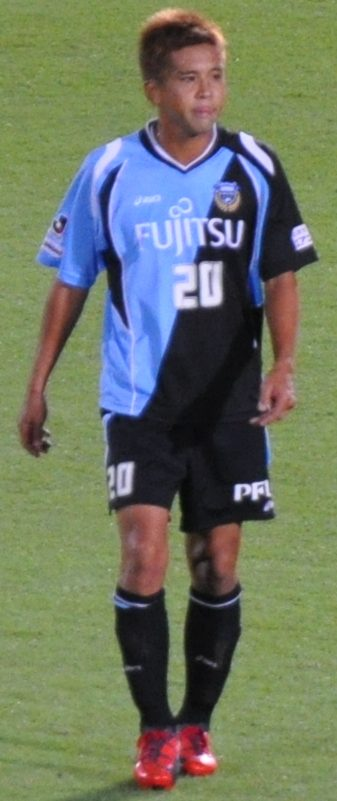
- Inamoto playing for Kawasaki Frontale in 2010

Personal information
- Full name: Junichi Inamoto
- Date of birth: 18 September 1979 (age 47)
- Place of birth: Kurino, Kagoshima, Japan
- Height: 1.81 m (5 ft 11 in)
- Position: Midfielder

Youth career
- 1992–1997: Gamba Osaka

Senior career*
Years	Team	Apps	(Gls)
1997–2004	Gamba Osaka	118	(16)
2001–2002	→ Arsenal (loan)	0	(0)
2002–2004	→ Fulham (loan)	41	(9)
2004–2006	West Bromwich Albion	28	(0)
2004–2005	→ Cardiff City (loan)	14	(0)
2006–2007	Galatasaray	25	(0)
2007–2009	Eintracht Frankfurt	43	(0)
2009–2010	Rennes	5	(0)
2010–2014	Kawasaki Frontale	99	(3)
2015–2018	Hokkaido Consadole Sapporo	47	(1)
2019–2021	SC Sagamihara	19	(1)
2022–2024	Nankatsu SC	2	(0)
Total		441	(25)

International career
1995	Japan U-17	3	(0)
1998–1999	Japan U-20	11	(4)
1998–2000	Japan U-23	15	(5)
2000–2010	Japan	82	(5)
Medal record
Men's football
Representing Japan
AFC Asian Cup
Winner	2000 Lebanon
FIFA Confederations Cup
Runner-up	2001 Korea/Japan
- * Club domestic league appearances and goals

Junichi Inamoto (稲本 潤一, Inamoto Jun'ichi; born 18 September 1979) is a Japanese former professional footballer who played as a midfielder. He is a retired international for the Japan national team.

== Club career ==
=== Gamba Osaka ===
Inamoto was born in the town of Kurino (now Yūsui) in Kagoshima Prefecture and raised in Sakai, Osaka Prefecture, where his family moved two months after his birth. He played for Japanese club Gamba Osaka during his last year of high school, signing with the club in 1997. In April of that year, at the age of 17, he made his debut in the 1997 J.League season, making him the youngest player in the J.League (at that time). He played for Gamba until summer 2001 and played 118 matches in the J1 League.

==== Loan to Arsenal ====
Inamoto was then one of many high-profile transfers of Asian players to Europe, signing with Arsenal of the English Premier League. Inamoto scored two goals for the Japan national team at the 2002 FIFA World Cup, but had already been released by Arsenal shortly before the tournament began.

==== Loan to Fulham ====
Inamoto was then signed by Fulham on a long-term loan deal from Gamba Osaka. Initially he settled well at the London club, garnering good notices as a tough-tackling midfielder with an eye for a spectacular goal. He became a fan favourite quickly, scoring four goals over the two legs of Fulham's 2002 UEFA Intertoto Cup final win against Bologna, scoring once in the first leg and a hat trick in the second. Other notable goals he scored in his time for Fulham include goals against Tottenham Hotspur, Sunderland, Middlesbrough and also in the 3–1 win against Manchester United at Old Trafford in October 2003. He also scored in the FA Cup against Everton which commentator Barry Davies described as "a Japanese peach". Inamoto was also described as "bigger than Beckham" by the Japanese media. However, he sustained a fractured tibia in an international friendly against England, and returned to Gamba Osaka to do promotional work. Fulham were interested in signing him once more, but concerns remained over his recovery from injury.

=== West Bromwich Albion ===
Inamoto signed with West Bromwich Albion for a decidedly small £200,000 transfer fee, which was only to be paid once he had made an appearance for the Midlands club. However, Gary Megson departed as West Bromwich Albion manager shortly afterwards, and successor Bryan Robson was unsure of the player.

==== Loan to Cardiff City ====
Inamoto was loaned to Cardiff City for the latter part of the 2004–05 season, and impressed, being recalled to play a role in West Brom's survival campaign in the Premiership. In 2005–06 he was a regular in the West Brom side, and was called up to the Japan squad for the 2006 FIFA World Cup, the first Albion player to play in the tournament for 20 years. While at West Brom Inamoto scored once, an extra time winner in a League Cup tie against former club Fulham on 25 October 2005.

=== Galatasaray ===
On 31 August 2006, Inamoto signed for Galatasaray.

=== Eintracht Frankfurt ===
On 29 May 2007, it was revealed that he signed a two-year contract with German club Eintracht Frankfurt, joining on a free transfer. Inamoto was presented in a press conference joining fellow Japanese striker Naohiro Takahara in Frankfurt and was released on 30 May 2009.

=== Rennes ===
On 19 June 2009, French Ligue 1 side Rennes announced that Inamoto had signed a contract with them.

=== Kawasaki Frontale ===
Inamoto signed for J1 League club Kawasaki Frontale on 11 January 2010 in a move back to his homeland after nine years away in Europe. He played for Frontale for 5 seasons. He left at the end of the 2014 season.

=== Hokkaido Consadole Sapporo ===
In 2015, Inamoto then subsequently featured for Hokkaido Consadole Sapporo (later Hokkaido Consadole Sapporo) in the J2 League. Consadole won the 2016 season and was promoted to J1. However he could only play single-digit matches every season from the 2016 season onward. He resigned at the end of the 2018 season.

=== SC Sagamihara ===
On 23 January 2019, Inamoto signed with J3 League club SC Sagamihara. On 15 June 2019, he scored his first goal for the club in a league match against Gamba Osaka U23.

=== Nankatsu SC ===
On 18 January 2022, Inamoto signed for fifth tier Kantō Soccer League club, Nankatsu SC. On 30 July 2023, he scored his first goal for the club at the age of 43 in a league match against Toin University of Yokohama scoring a header.

He retired from playing in December 2024.

== International career ==
In August 1995, Inamoto was selected for Japan U17 for the 1995 U-17 World Championship. He played all three matches. In April 1999, he was selected for Japan U20 for the 1999 FIFA World Youth Championship. At this tournament, he played three matches as Japan finished second.

On 5 February 2000, Inamoto debuted for the senior Japan national team under manager Philippe Troussier against Mexico. After his debut, Inamoto played ten matches or more every year under Troussier.

In September 2000, Inamoto was selected for Japan U23 for 2000 Summer Olympics. He played the full game in all four matches and scored a goal against Slovakia.

In 2000, Inamoto played at the 2000 AFC Asian Cup. He played four matches as Japan won the championship. In 2001, he also played at the 2001 FIFA Confederations Cup. He played four matches as Japan finished second. In 2002, he was selected by Japan for the 2002 FIFA World Cup. He played all four matches and scored two goals against Belgium in the first match and Russia in the second match. Japan qualified for the knockout stage for the first time in their history.

After the 2002 FIFA World Cup, Inamoto played at the 2003 and the 2005 FIFA Confederations Cup. In 2006, he was selected by Japan for the 2006 FIFA World Cup. He played two matches as Japan was eliminated at the group stage.

After the 2006 FIFA World Cup, due to generational change, Inamoto was not selected for Japan again until June 2007. After that, he played several matches every year. In 2010, he was selected for the 2010 FIFA World Cup. He played two matches as Japan qualified for the knockout stage. This World Cup would mark Inamoto's last game for Japan. In total, he played 82 games and scored 5 goals for the national side.

== Career statistics ==
=== Club ===
As of 14 October 2022

Appearances and goals by club, season and competition
Club	Season	League			National cup		League cup		Continental		Total	
Club	Season	Division	Apps	Goals	Apps	Goals	Apps	Goals	Apps	Goals	Apps	Goals
Gamba Osaka	1997	J1 League	27	3	3	0	6	0	–		36	3
Gamba Osaka	1998	J1 League	28	6	1	0	4	0	–		33	6
Gamba Osaka	1999	J1 League	22	1	2	0	0	0	–		24	1
Gamba Osaka	2000	J1 League	28	4	2	0	4	1	–		34	5
Gamba Osaka	2001	J1 League	13	2	0	0	3	0	–		16	2
Gamba Osaka	Total		118	16	8	0	17	1	–		143	17
Arsenal (loan)	2001–02	Premier League	0	0	0	0	2	0	2	0	4	0
Fulham (loan)	2002–03	Premier League	19	2	2	0	2	0	10 (Note: Includes appearances in the Intertoto Cup)	4	33	6
Fulham (loan)	2003–04	Premier League	22	2	2	1	1	0	–		25	3
Fulham (loan)	Total		41	4	4	1	3	0	10	4	58	9
West Bromwich Albion	2004–05	Premier League	3	0	0	0	0	0	–		3	0
West Bromwich Albion	2005–06	Premier League	22	0	2	0	2	1	–		26	1
West Bromwich Albion	2006–07	Championship	3	0	0	0	0	0	–		3	0
West Bromwich Albion	Total		28	0	2	0	2	1	–		32	1
Cardiff City (loan)	2004–05	Championship	14	0	2	0	0	0	–		16	0
Galatasaray	2006–07	Süper Lig	25	0	3	0	–		5	1	33	1
Eintracht Frankfurt	2007–08	Bundesliga	24	0	2	0	–		–		26	0
Eintracht Frankfurt	2008–09	Bundesliga	19	0	1	0	–		–		20	0
Eintracht Frankfurt	Total		43	0	3	0	–		–		46	0
Rennes	2009–10	Ligue 1	5	0	0	0	0	0	–		5	0
Kawasaki Frontale	2010	J1 League	28	0	2	0	4	0	5	0	39	0
Kawasaki Frontale	2011	J1 League	12	2	1	0	1	0	–		14	2
Kawasaki Frontale	2012	J1 League	20	0	1	0	3	0	–		24	0
Kawasaki Frontale	2013	J1 League	25	0	3	0	10	0	–		36	0
Kawasaki Frontale	2014	J1 League	14	1	1	0	1	0	3	0	19	1
Kawasaki Frontale	Total		99	3	8	0	20	0	8	0	135	3
Consadole Sapporo	2015	J2 League	31	0	1	0	–		–		32	0
Consadole Sapporo	2016	J2 League	8	1	0	0	–		–		8	1
Consadole Sapporo	2017	J1 League	6	0	0	0	0	0	–		6	0
Consadole Sapporo	2018	J1 League	2	0	1	0	5	0	–		8	0
Consadole Sapporo	Total		47	1	2	0	5	0	–		54	0
SC Sagamihara	2019	J3 League	9	1	0	0	–		–		9	1
SC Sagamihara	2020	J3 League	1	0	0	0	–		–		1	0
SC Sagamihara	2021	J2 League	9	0	2	0	–		–		11	0
Nankatsu SC	2022	Kanto Soccer League	2	0	0	0	–		–		2	0
Career total			441	25	34	1	49	2	25	5	549	33

=== International ===
Appearances and goals by national team and year
National team	Year	Apps	Goals
Japan	2000	14	0
Japan	2001	11	1
Japan	2002	11	2
Japan	2003	10	1
Japan	2004	6	0
Japan	2005	10	0
Japan	2006	4	0
Japan	2007	3	0
Japan	2008	2	0
Japan	2009	4	1
Japan	2010	8	0
Total		82	5

Scores and results list Japan's goal tally first, score column indicates score after each Inamoto goal.

List of international goals scored by Junichi Inamoto
No.	Date	Venue	Opponent	Score	Result	Competition
1	4 July 2001	Ōita, Japan	FR Yugoslavia		1–0	Friendly match
2	4 June 2002	Saitama, Japan	Belgium		2–2	2002 FIFA World Cup Group Stage
3	9 June 2002	Yokohama, Japan	Russia		1–0	2002 FIFA World Cup Group Stage
4	28 March 2003	Tokyo, Japan	Uruguay		2–2	Friendly match
5	9 September 2009	Utrecht, Netherlands	Ghana		4–3	Friendly match

== Honours ==
Fulham

- UEFA Intertoto Cup: 2002

Hokkaido Consodale Sapporo

- J2 League: 2016

Japan U17

- AFC U-17 Championship: 1994

Japan U20

- FIFA World Youth Championship runner-up: 1999

Japan

- AFC Asian Cup: 2000
- FIFA Confederations Cup runner-up: 2001

Individual

- J.League Best Eleven: 2000
