= Kurino =

Kurino may refer to:

- Kurino, Kagoshima, a former town in Aira District, Kagoshima Prefecture, Japan
- Kurino Station, a railway station in Aira District, Kagoshima Prefecture, Japan

== People with the surname ==
- Shin'ichirō Kurino (栗野 慎一郎, 1851–1937), Japanese diplomat
