= Yoshimatsu =

Yoshimatsu (written: 吉松) may refer to:

- Yoshimatsu, Kagoshima (吉松町, Yoshimatsu-chō), former town in Aira District, Kagoshima Prefecture, Japan
- Yoshimatsu Station (吉松駅, Yoshimatsu-eki), train station in Aira District
- Yoshimatsu (name)
