= Erina Matsui =

Japanese artist

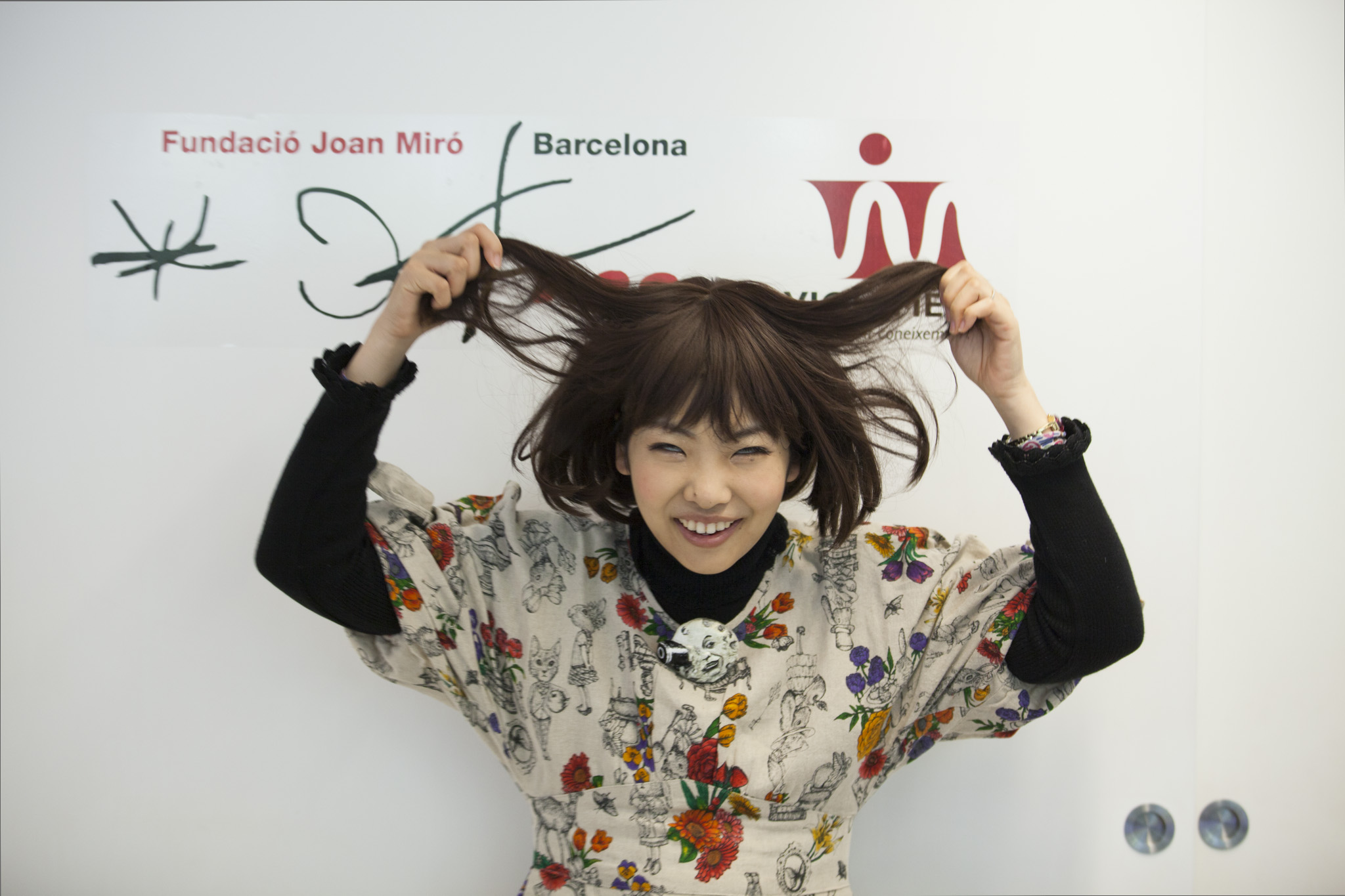
- Matsui in 2013
- Born: 8 January 1984 (age 42); Okayama, Japan
- Education: BFA, Tama Art University 2008
- Occupation: Artist
- Known for: Surreal self-portrait paintings

Erina Matsui (松井 えり菜, Matsui Erina; born January 8, 1984) is a Japanese contemporary artist. She is known for her surreal self-portraits, mostly done as oil paintings. Her work has been praised for its jarring visual impact as it defies normal representations of childhood being cute and innocent.

== Early life and education ==
Matsui was born in 1984 in Okayama, Japan where she grew up. As a student, she studied oil painting and went on to win the Shell Art Award in 2004. Her education also led her to study abroad in Finland as an exchange student at the University of Art & Design Helsinki in 2006.

She graduated in 2008 with a B.F.A. from Tama Art University in Tokyo, and completed her M.A. in 2010 at the Tokyo University of the Arts. She continued her education in 2012 by fulfilling an artist residency at the Kunstlerhaus Bethanien in Germany, having been sponsored as a fellow for Japan's Agency of Cultural Affairs Overseas Training Program.

== Career ==
Before she even graduated from Tama Art University, Matsui debuted as a rising artist in 2004 at the age of 20. That year, Matsui's painting "I Love Ebi-Chili" won the gold medal for Takashi Murakami's Geisai art fair in Tokyo. One of the jury members there, Hervé Chandès (who is also the director of the Foundation Cartier in Paris), took note of her paintings and brought her on to be displayed in a group show ("J'en rêve") in summer 2005. Her pieces at the show were bought and are currently in a collection at the Foundation Cartier.

Since then, her paintings have also been purchased by the Pigozzi Collection (New York), the Takahashi Collection (Tokyo), and the Ohara Museum (Okayama). In addition to being shown in exhibits across Japan and Europe, her paintings are popular among private art collectors, such as the French billionaire Francois Pinault and the fashion designer Maurizio Galante.

Most recently, her paintings were featured in a solo show exhibition ("Planet of the Face") in 2016 at the Kirishima Open-Air Museum.

She is currently based in Tokyo.

== Art style ==
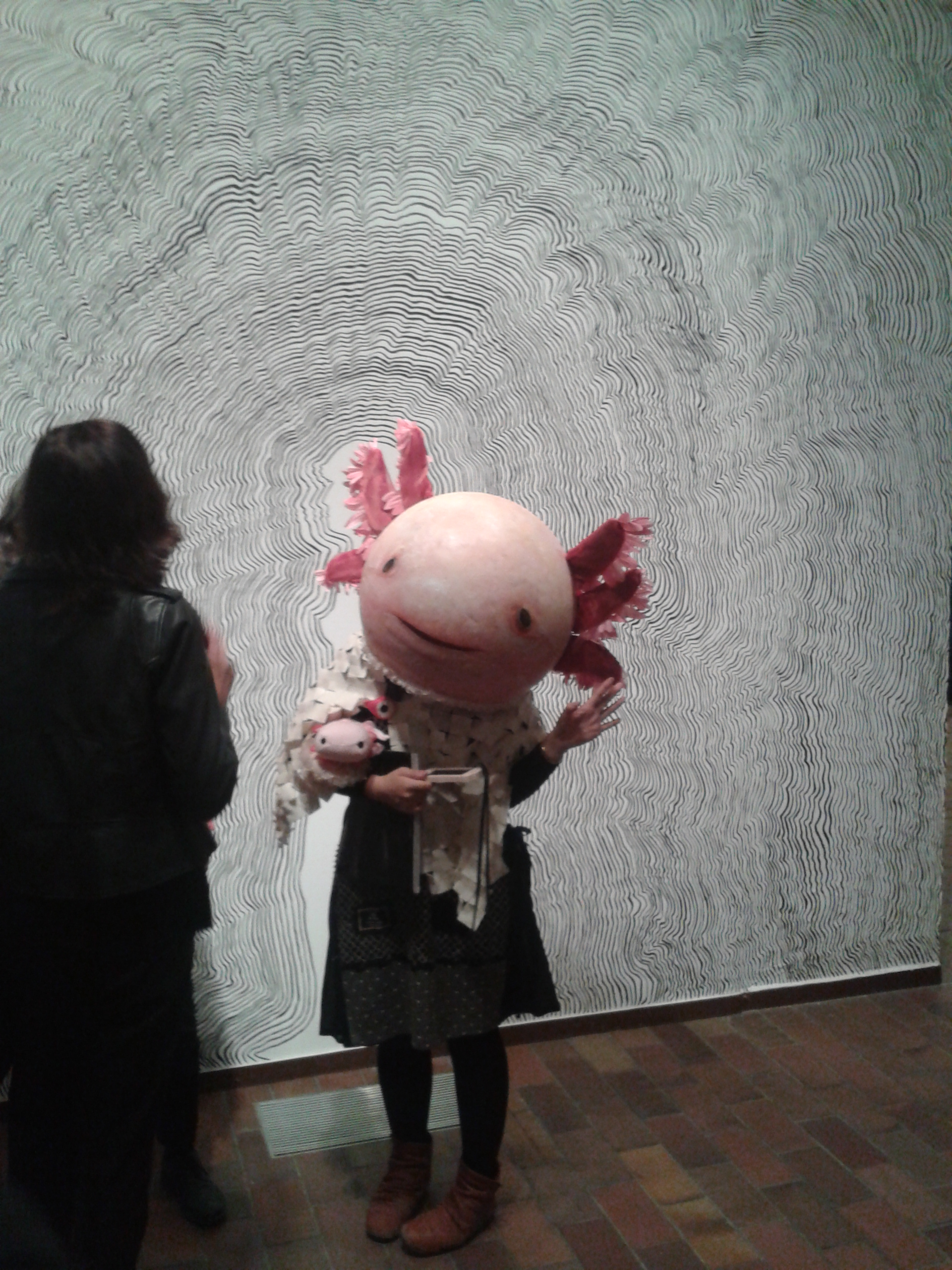
Matsui during the inauguration of the exhibit "A Place Where Artists Have the Right to Fail," commemorating the 35th anniversary for Room 13 of the Fundació Joan Miró.

Matsui most commonly produces oil painting portraits of herself, distorting her features in surreal ways that end up disturbing or absurd.

Although she began her career through Murakami's Geisei art fair, her paintings are elaborately composed and contain depth that distinguishes her work from the Superflat art style associated with Murakami and Kaikai Kiki artists. Matsui intentionally chose not to join the Kaikai Kiki (Murakami's art production and artist management company), choosing to prioritize art school education instead.

As a young artist, her self-portraits are often used as an exploration in understanding the unknown world. Her paintings play upon popular themes of Japanese kawaii culture, as well as incorporating symbols of childhood nostalgia such as toys or lullabies to represent the anxiety of young adults growing up. Axelotls are a reoccurring motif in her work meant to highlight both the fantastical and otherworldly quality of her paintings.

== Exhibitions ==
Matsui's work has been featured in multiple solo shows since her debut in 2004:

- 2007
  - My Cosmo, YAMAMOTO GENDAI, Tokyo
  - Cycle: Kawaii! Japan Today, Fundació Joan Miró, Barcelona, Spain
- 2010
  - One-Touch Time Machine!, YAMAMOTO GENDAI, Tokyo
- 2012
  - Sunrise Erina, Ohara Museum of Art, Okayama
  - Wabi Sabi Utopia, YAMAMOTO GENDAI, Tokyo
- 2013
  - Road Sweet Road, Künstlerhaus Bethanien, Germany
- 2015
  - Manga Mind Serenade – non-stop painting, YAMAMOTO GENDAI, Tokyo
- 2016
  - Planet of the Faces, Kirishima Open-Air Museum, Kagoshima

== See also ==
- Takashi Murakami, Japanese contemporary artist
