= Kurino Station =

Railway station in Yūsui, Kagoshima Prefecture, Japan

Kurino Station 栗野駅
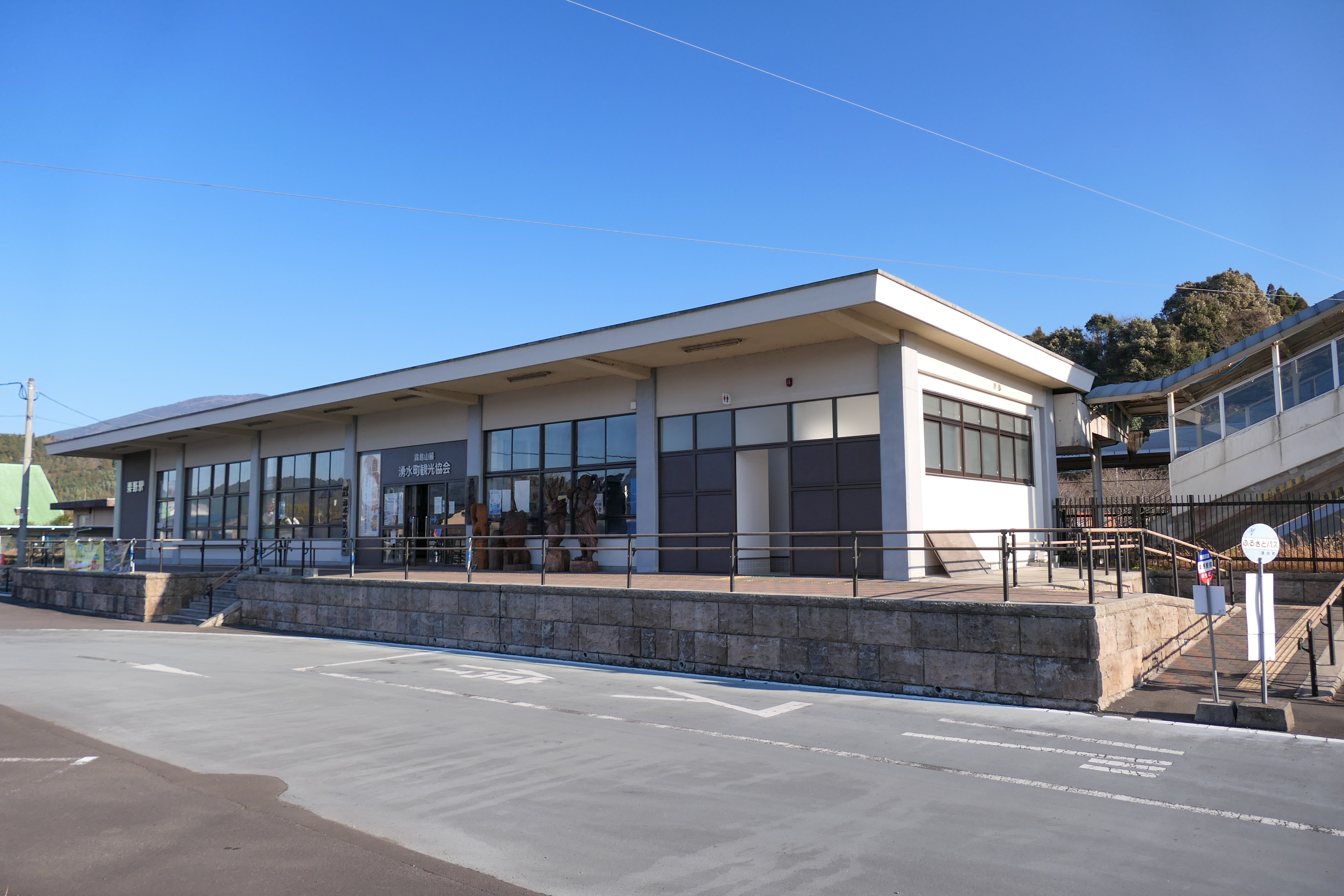
- Kurino Station in January 2022

General information
- Location: 667 Koba, Yūsui-cho, Aira-gun, Kagoshima-ken 899-6201; Japan
- Coordinates: 31°57′02″N 130°43′24″E
- Operator: JR Kyushu
- Line: ■ Hisatsu Line
- Distance: 94.3 km from Yatsushiro
- Platforms: 1 island platform

Construction
- Accessible: No - platforms linked by footbridge

Other information
- Website: Official website

History
- Opened: 5 September 1903

Passengers
- FY2013: 365

Services
Preceding station	JR Kyushu	Following station
Yoshimatsu towards Yatsushiro	Hisatsu Line	Ōsumi-Yokogawa towards Hayato
Location
- Location within Kagoshima Prefecture Location within Japan

Kurino Station (栗野駅, Kurino-eki) is a passenger railway station located in the town of Yūsui, Aira District, Kagoshima Prefecture, Japan. It is operated by JR Kyushu.

== Lines ==
The station is served by the Hisatsu Line and is located 94.3 km from the starting point of the line at Yatsushiro.

== Layout ==
The station consists of an island platform with two tracks at grade. A side platform (Platform 1) adjacent to the station building was used by the now discontinued Yamano Line and is no longer in use. The station building is connected to the island platform by an overpass. The station building is a one-story concrete building. There is a waiting area and ticket gates inside the station building. It is a simple consignment station. There are no automatic ticket vending machines, and payment must be made on the train early in the morning and at night. An upright piano was installed in the waiting area on March 11, 2017 through a street piano project conducted by volunteers in Kagoshima Prefecture.

=== Platforms ===
2	■ ■ Hisatsu Line	for Yoshimatsu and Miyakonojō
3	■ ■Hisatsu Line	for Hayato and Kagoshima

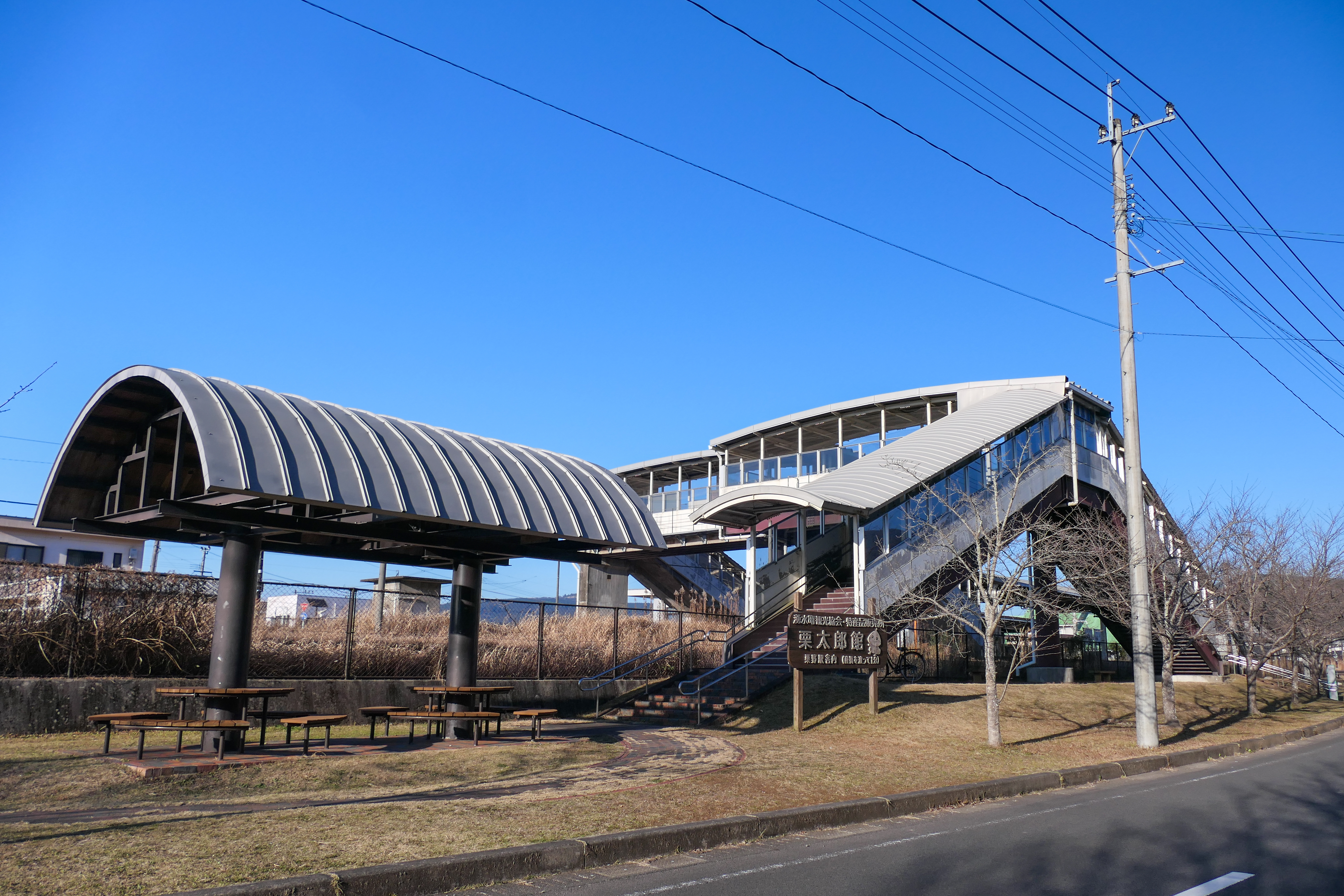
Footbridge viewed from the south

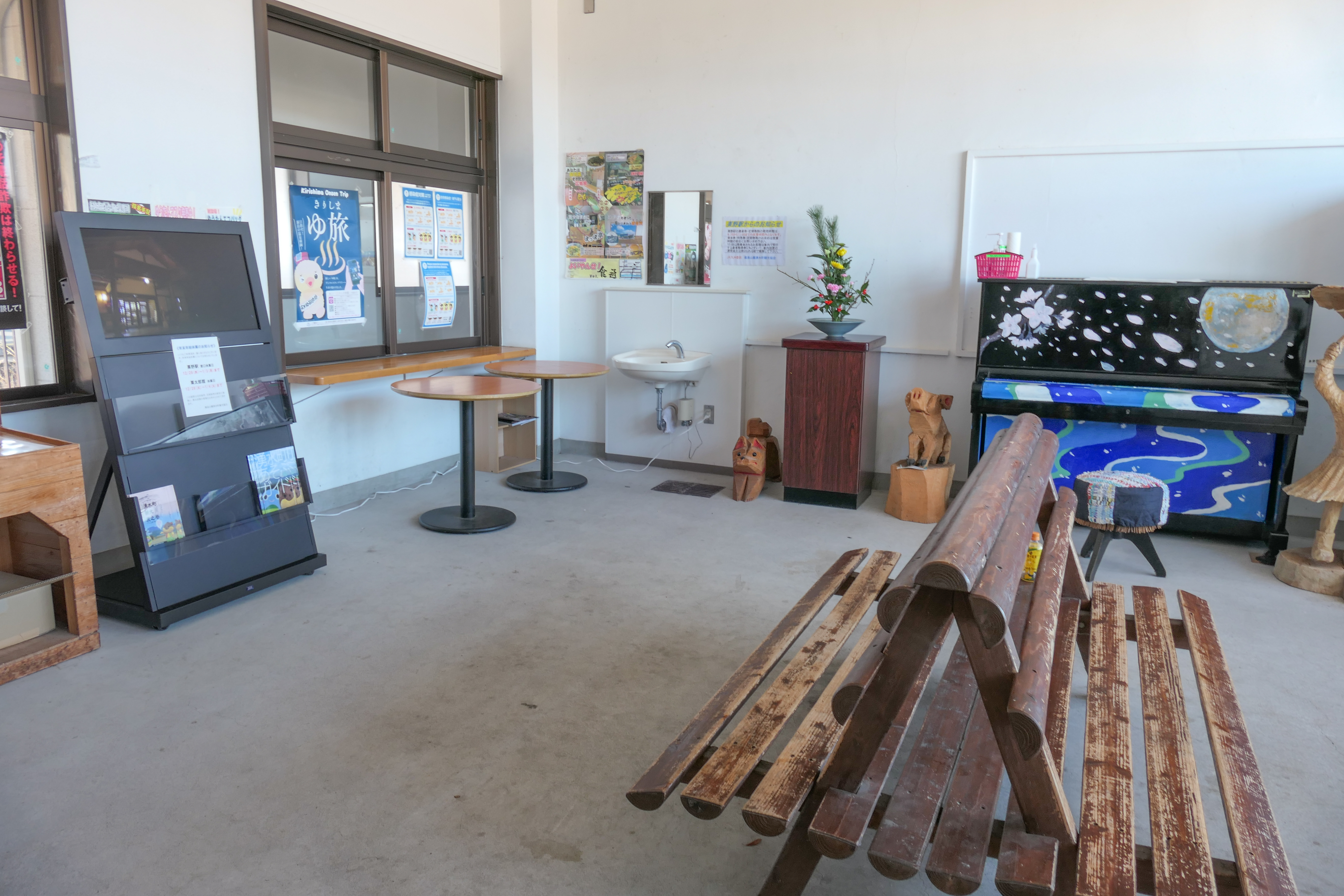
Waiting Room

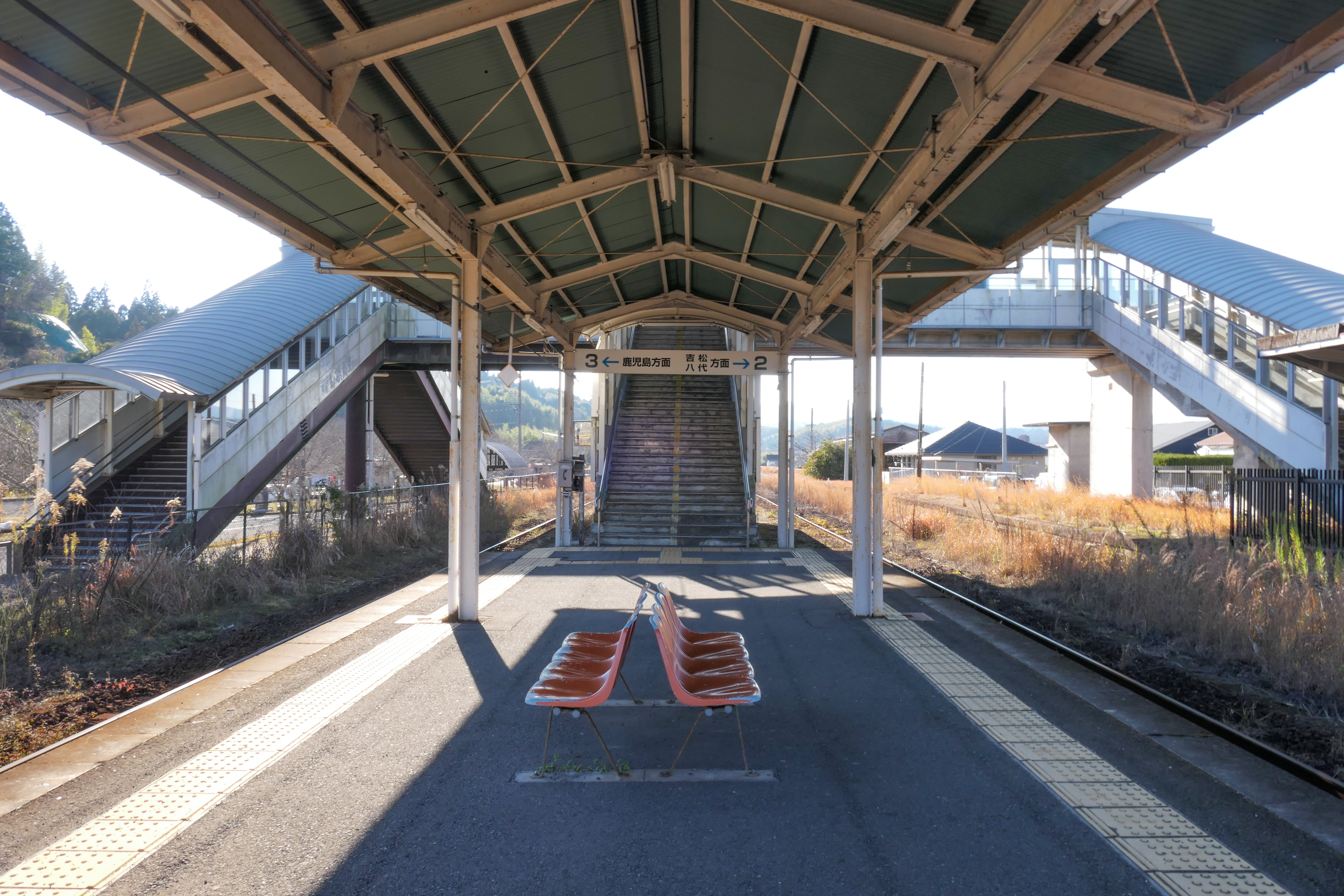
Platform

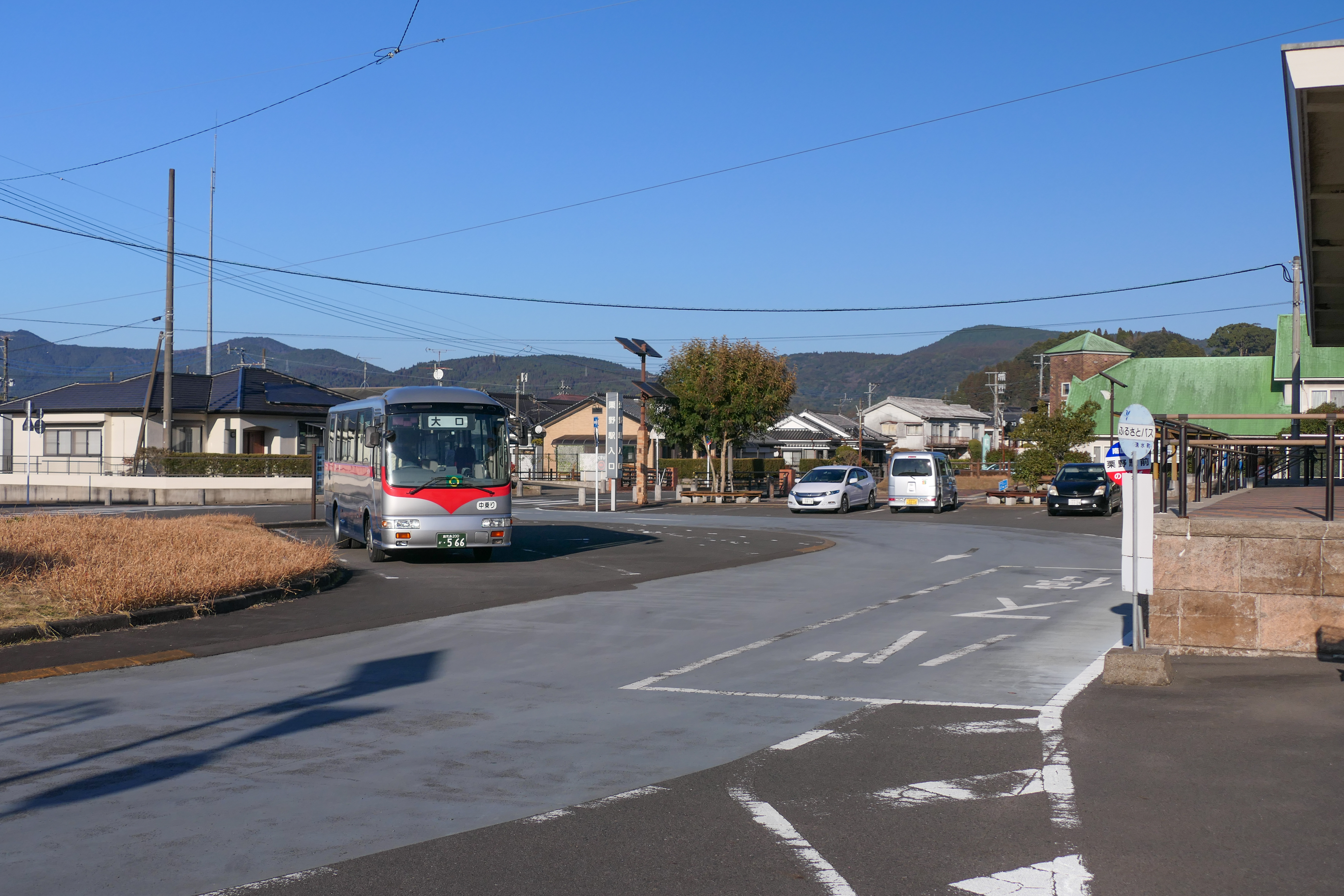
Rotary in front of station

== History ==
The station was opened by Japanese Government Railways (JGR) on 5 September 1903 in conjunction with the extension of the Kagoshima Line from Yokogawa Station (currently Osumi Yokogawa Station) to this station. On 11 September 1921 the Yamano Light Rail Line opens from this station to Yamano. This is renamed the Yamano Line on 2 September 1922. Freight services were discontinued in 1982 and baggage handling from 1984. With the privatization of Japanese National Railways (JNR), the successor of JGR, on 1 April 1987, Nishi Kobayashi came under the control of JR Kyushu. The Yamano Line was abolished on 1 February 1988.

== Passenger statistics ==
In fiscal 2013, the station was used by an average of 365 passengers daily

== Surrounding area ==
- Kirishima Open Air Museum
- National Route 268
- Yūsui Town Hall
- Yūsui Town Kurino Junior High School
- Yūsui Town Kurino Junior Elementary School
- Kurino Kindergarten
- Kurino Post Office
- Kyūshū Expressway: Kurino Interchange

== See also ==
- List of railway stations in Japan
