= 2014 Kawasaki Frontale season =

Kawasaki Frontale
2014 season
- Manager: Yahiro Kazama
- Stadium: Kawasaki Todoroki Stadium
- J1 League: 6th

During the 2014 season, Kawasaki Frontale competed in the J. League 1, where they finished 6th. The club also competed in the Emperor's Cup and the J. League Cup.

== J1 League ==
=== League table ===
Pos	Team	Pld	W	D	L	GF	GA	GD	Pts	Qualification or relegation
4	Kashiwa Reysol	34	17	9	8	48	40	+8	60	Qualification for 2015 AFC Champions League Third qualifying round (Note: Because Gamba Osaka also won the 2014 Emperor's Cup, the group stage spot has been given to third-placed Kashima Antlers, while ACL qualification spot was awarded to the fourth-placed Kashiwa Reysol.)
5	Sagan Tosu	34	19	3	12	41	33	+8	60	
6	Kawasaki Frontale	34	16	7	11	56	43	+13	55	
7	Yokohama F. Marinos	34	14	9	11	37	29	+8	51	
8	Sanfrecce Hiroshima	34	13	11	10	44	37	+7	50	

Updated to match(es) played on 8 December 2014. Source: J.League Data
Rules for classification: 1) points; 2) goal difference; 3) number of goals scored.

=== Matches ===
J1 League results
Match	Date	Team	Score	Team	Venue	Attendance
1	2014.03.02	Kawasaki Frontale	2-2	Vissel Kobe	Kawasaki Todoroki Stadium	14,011
2	2014.03.08	Sanfrecce Hiroshima	2-1	Kawasaki Frontale	Edion Stadium Hiroshima	16,176
3	2014.03.15	Kawasaki Frontale	3-4	Omiya Ardija	Kawasaki Todoroki Stadium	13,498
4	2014.03.23	FC Tokyo	0-4	Kawasaki Frontale	Ajinomoto Stadium	23,172
5	2014.03.28	Kawasaki Frontale	1-0	Nagoya Grampus	Kawasaki Todoroki Stadium	12,431
6	2014.04.06	Tokushima Vortis	0-4	Kawasaki Frontale	Pocarisweat Stadium	8,467
7	2014.04.11	Kawasaki Frontale	1-1	Kashiwa Reysol	Kawasaki Todoroki Stadium	12,379
8	2014.04.19	Urawa Reds	1-0	Kawasaki Frontale	Saitama Stadium 2002	35,239
9	2014.04.26	Kawasaki Frontale	2-1	Gamba Osaka	Kawasaki Todoroki Stadium	19,164
10	2014.04.29	Vegalta Sendai	0-0	Kawasaki Frontale	Yurtec Stadium Sendai	13,040
11	2014.05.03	Kawasaki Frontale	2-0	Ventforet Kofu	Kawasaki Todoroki Stadium	18,261
13	2014.05.10	Kawasaki Frontale	4-1	Kashima Antlers	Kawasaki Todoroki Stadium	17,451
14	2014.05.18	Kawasaki Frontale	0-3	Yokohama F. Marinos	Kawasaki Todoroki Stadium	19,668
12	2014.07.15	Cerezo Osaka	1-2	Kawasaki Frontale	Kincho Stadium	15,873
15	2014.07.19	Shimizu S-Pulse	0-2	Kawasaki Frontale	IAI Stadium Nihondaira	15,305
16	2014.07.23	Sagan Tosu	0-1	Kawasaki Frontale	Best Amenity Stadium	23,277
17	2014.07.27	Kawasaki Frontale	1-0	Albirex Niigata	Kawasaki Todoroki Stadium	19,254
18	2014.08.02	Kashiwa Reysol	4-1	Kawasaki Frontale	Hitachi Kashiwa Stadium	11,963
19	2014.08.09	Kawasaki Frontale	2-1	Urawa Reds	Kawasaki Todoroki Stadium	18,378
20	2014.08.16	Kawasaki Frontale	5-4	Cerezo Osaka	Kawasaki Todoroki Stadium	18,124
21	2014.08.23	Yokohama F. Marinos	2-0	Kawasaki Frontale	NHK Spring Mitsuzawa Football Stadium	14,014
22	2014.08.30	Nagoya Grampus	1-1	Kawasaki Frontale	Nagoya Mizuho Athletic Stadium	15,312
23	2014.09.13	Kawasaki Frontale	4-0	Tokushima Vortis	Kawasaki Todoroki Stadium	18,444
24	2014.09.20	Kawasaki Frontale	0-0	FC Tokyo	Kawasaki Todoroki Stadium	18,805
25	2014.09.23	Omiya Ardija	1-3	Kawasaki Frontale	NACK5 Stadium Omiya	12,848
26	2014.09.27	Kawasaki Frontale	1-1	Vegalta Sendai	Kawasaki Todoroki Stadium	18,127
27	2014.10.05	Albirex Niigata	3-0	Kawasaki Frontale	Denka Big Swan Stadium	17,265
28	2014.10.18	Gamba Osaka	1-0	Kawasaki Frontale	Expo '70 Commemorative Stadium	17,615
29	2014.10.22	Kawasaki Frontale	2-0	Sagan Tosu	Kawasaki Todoroki Stadium	10,609
30	2014.10.26	Ventforet Kofu	2-1	Kawasaki Frontale	Yamanashi Chuo Bank Stadium	10,536
31	2014.11.02	Kawasaki Frontale	2-3	Shimizu S-Pulse	Kawasaki Todoroki Stadium	19,169
32	2014.11.22	Kashima Antlers	2-1	Kawasaki Frontale	Kashima Soccer Stadium	20,261
33	2014.11.29	Kawasaki Frontale	1-1	Sanfrecce Hiroshima	Kawasaki Todoroki Stadium	15,468
34	2014.12.06	Vissel Kobe	1-2	Kawasaki Frontale	Noevir Stadium Kobe	17,574
