= Yūsui, Kagoshima =

Yūsui 湧水町
- Town
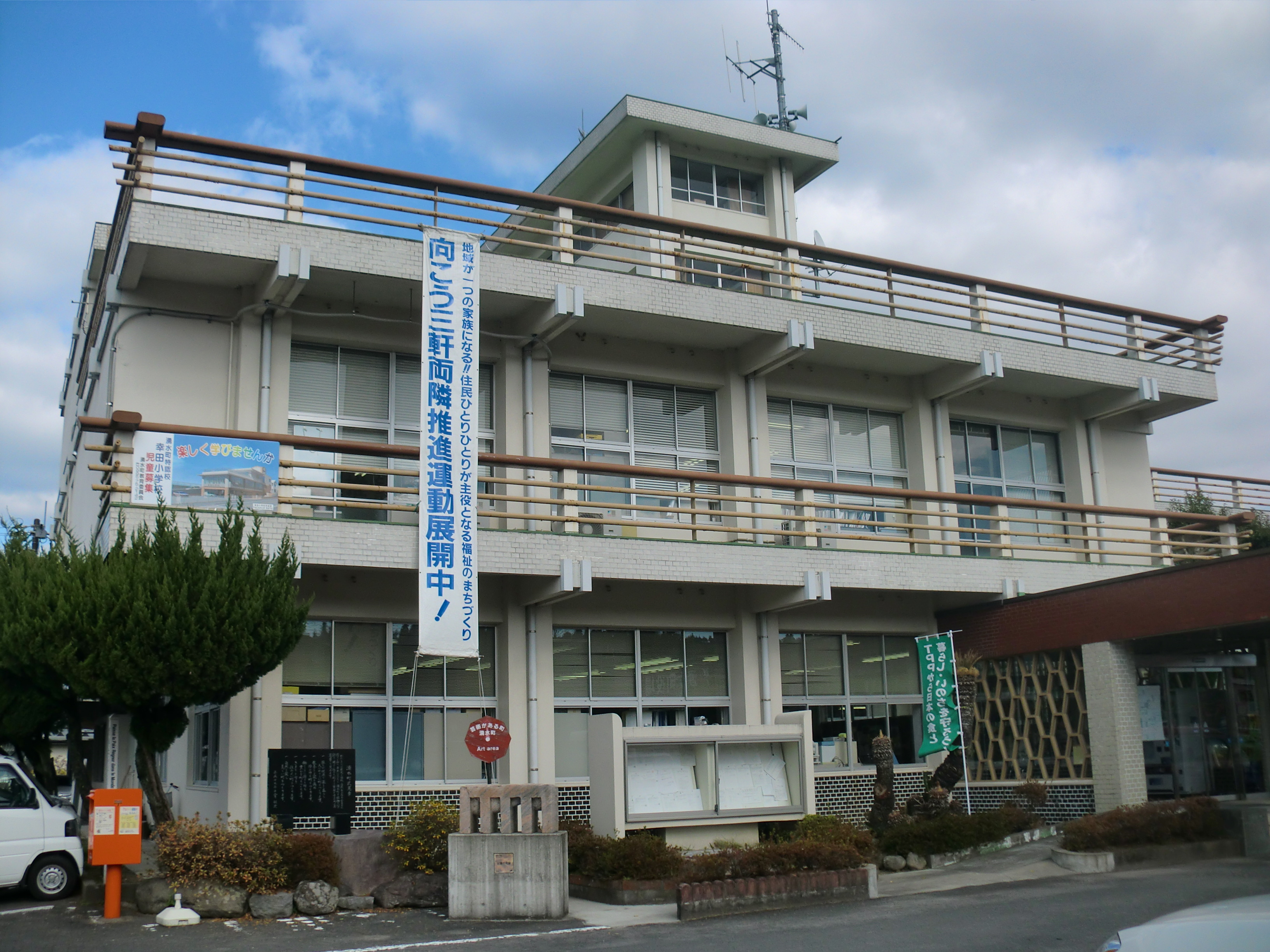
- Yūsui city hall

- Flag Seal
- Location of Yūsui in Kagoshima Prefecture

- Location in Japan
- Coordinates: 31°57′06″N 130°43′16″E
- Country: Japan
- Region: Kyushu
- Prefecture: Kagoshima
- District: Aira

Area
  - Total: 144.29 km^{2} (55.71 sq mi)

Population (March 31, 2024)
  - Total: 8,361
  - Density: 57.95/km^{2} (150.1/sq mi)
- Time zone: UTC+09:00 (JST)
- City hall address: 222 Kiba, Yūsui-chō, Aira-gun, Kagoshima-ken 899-6292
- Website: Official website
- Symbols
- Bird: Japanese bush warbler
- Flower: Iris ensata
- Tree: Prunus itosakura

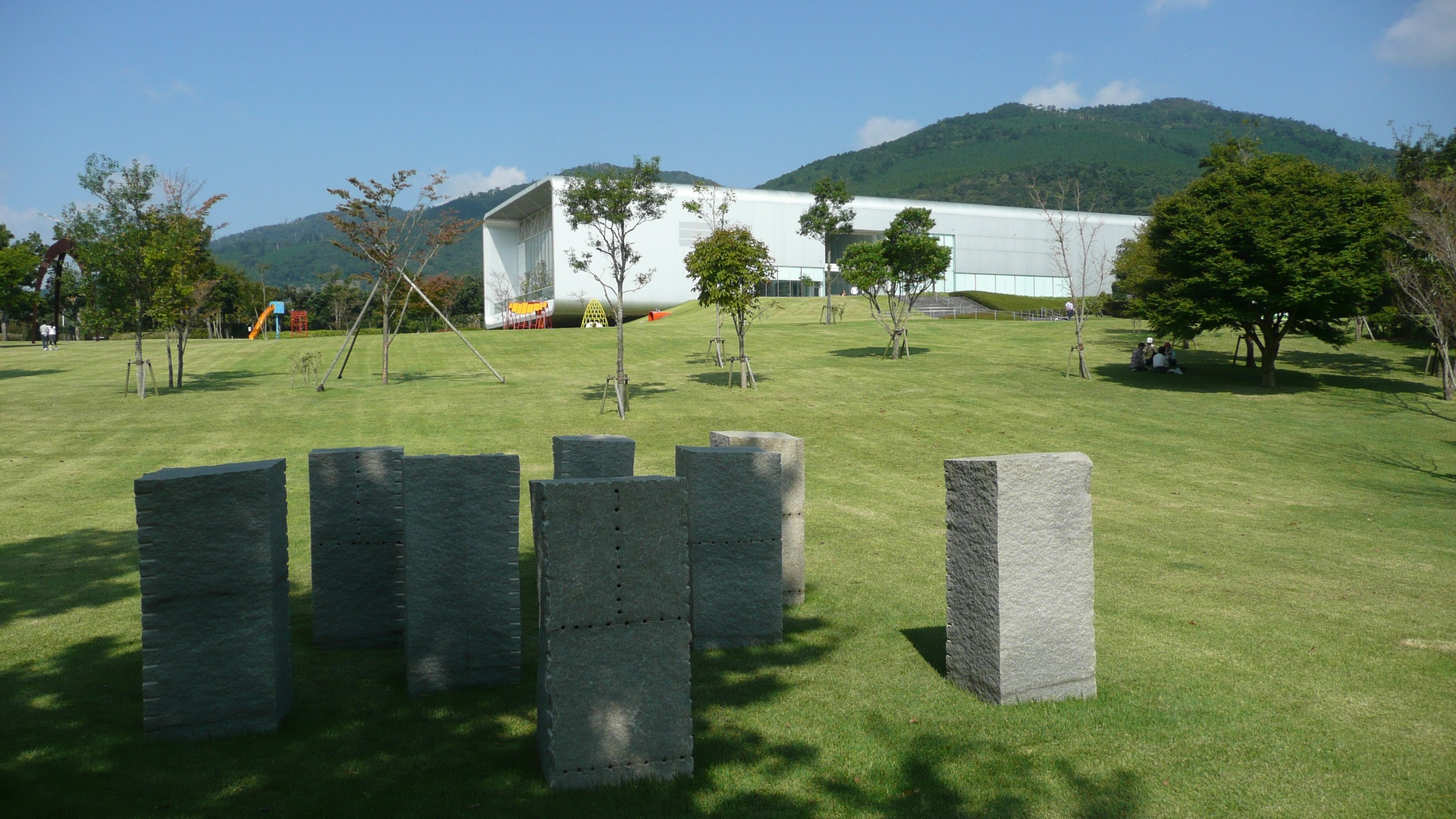
Kirishima Open-Air Museum

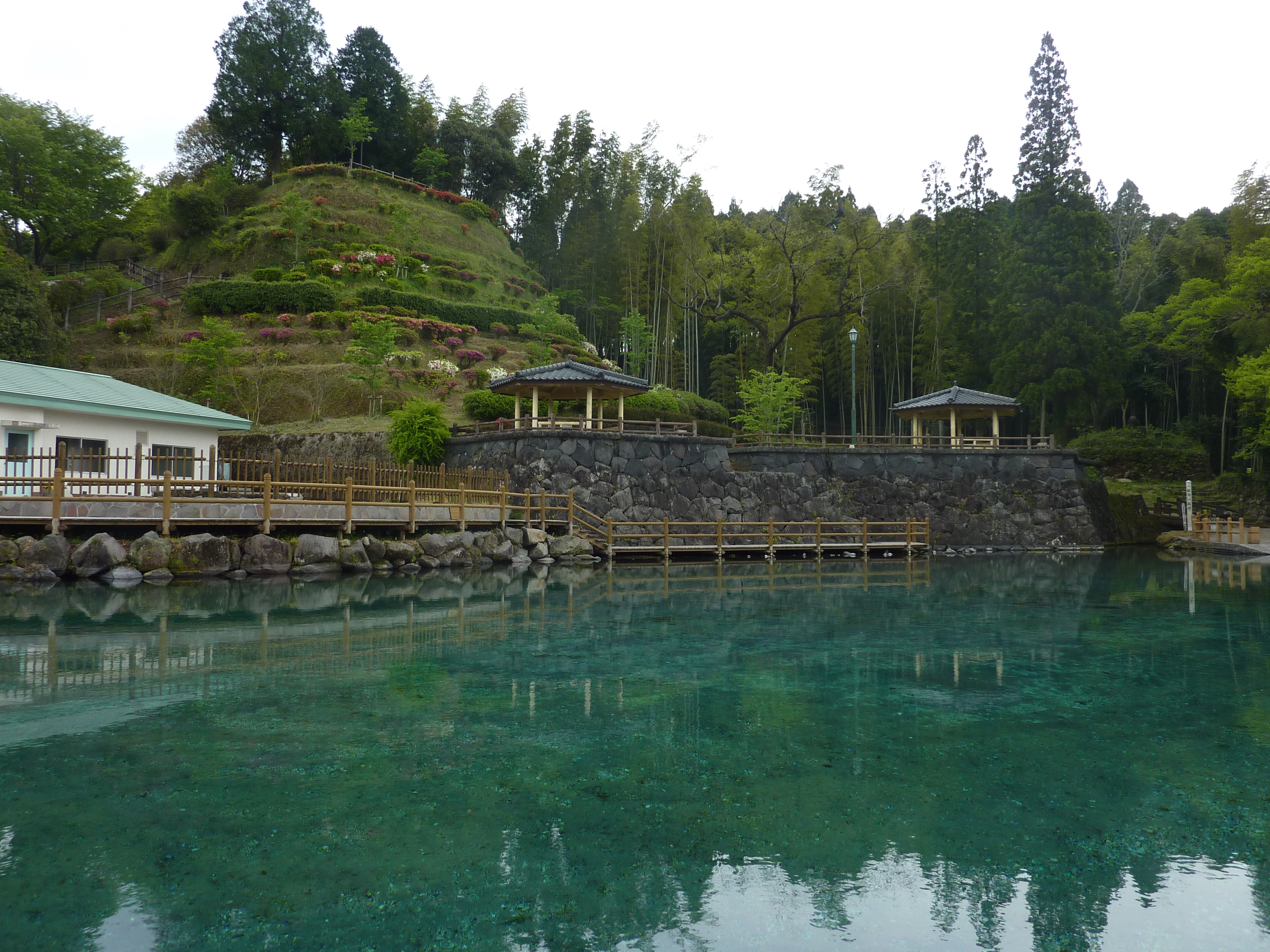
Maru-ike springs

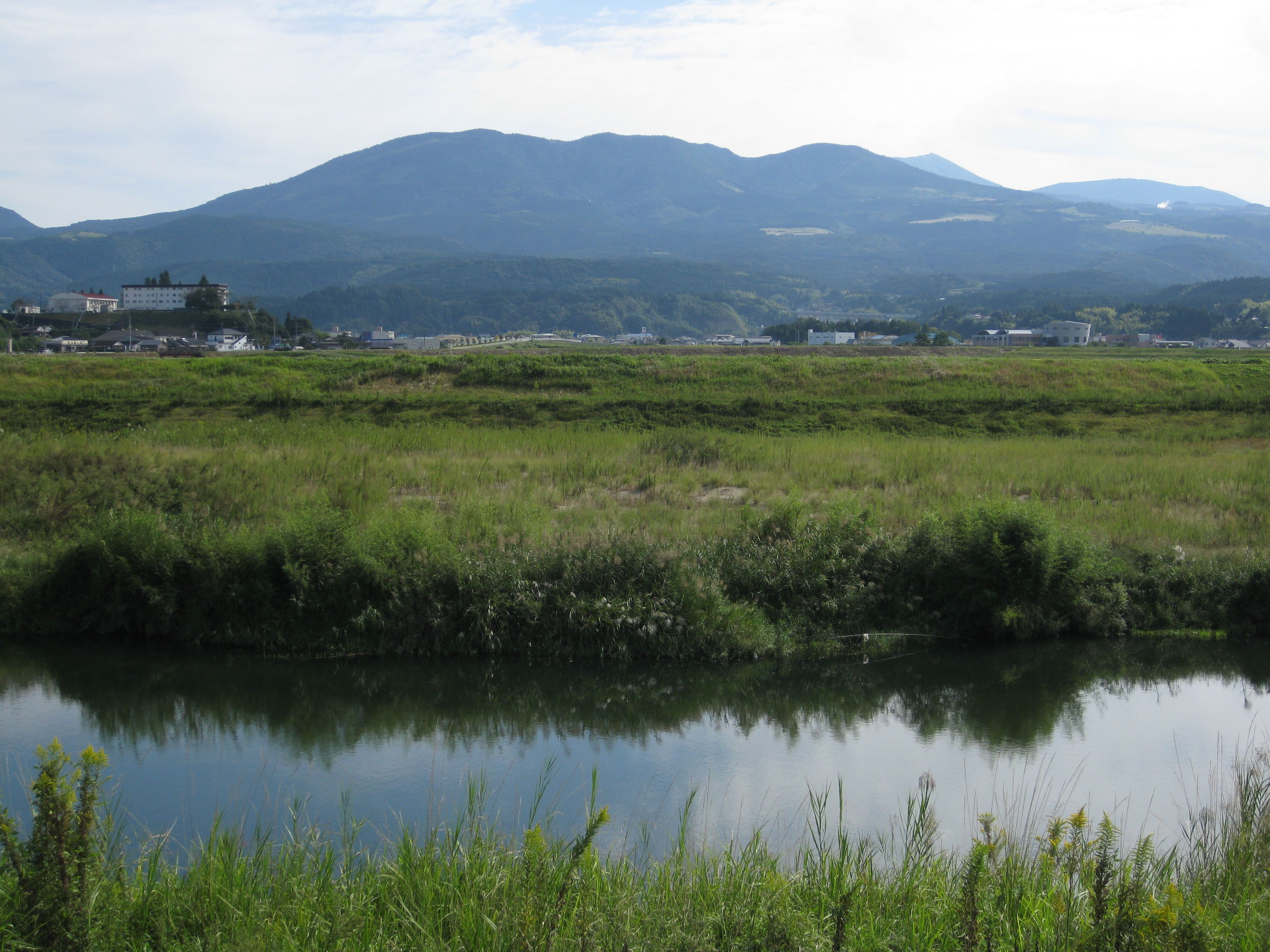
Kurinodake

Yūsui (湧水町, Yūsui-chō) is a town located in Aira District, Kagoshima Prefecture, Japan.As of 31 March 2024, the town had an estimated population of 8,361 in 4600 households, and a population density of 58 persons per km^{2}. The total area of the town is 144.29 km^{2} (55.71 sq mi). "Yūsui" literally means "spring water", referring to springs in the town.

== Geography ==
Yūsui is located in the inland region of north-central Kagoshima Prefecture, approximately 70 kilometers northeast of Kagoshima City, and is a basin surrounded by the Kyushu Mountains and the Kirishima Mountain Range. Parts of the town are within the borders of the Kirishima-Yaku National Park.

=== Neighboring municipalities ===
Kagoshima Prefecture

- Isa
- Kirishima
- Satsuma

Miyazaki Prefecture

- Ebino

=== Climate ===
Yūsui has a humid subtropical climate (Köppen Cfa) characterized by warm summers and cool winters with light to no snowfall. The average annual temperature in Yūsui is 14.9 °C. The average annual rainfall is 2260 mm with September as the wettest month. The temperatures are highest on average in August, at around 25.0 °C, and lowest in January, at around 4.2 °C.

=== Demographics ===
Per Japanese census data, the population of Yūsui is as shown below:

Historical population
Year	Pop.	±%
1920	14,875	—
1930	16,436	+10.5%
1940	18,106	+10.2%
1950	23,204	+28.2%
1960	21,496	−7.4%
1970	16,082	−25.2%
1980	13,982	−13.1%
1990	13,851	−0.9%
2000	13,237	−4.4%
2010	11,595	−12.4%
2020	9,119	−21.4%

== History ==
The area of Yūsui was part of ancient Ōsumi Province. During the Edo Period, the area was part of the holdings of Satsuma Domain. The villages of Kurino and Yoshimatsu were established on May 1, 1889, with the creation of the modern municipalities system. Kurino was raised to town status on April 1, 1932, followed by Yoshimatsu on February 11, 1953. The town of Yūsui was founded on March 22, 2005, from the merger of the towns of Kurino and Yoshimatsu, both from Aira District.

== Government ==
Yūsui has a mayor-council form of government with a directly elected mayor and a unicameral town council of 12 members. Yūsui, collectively with the city of Kirishima, contributes four members to the Kagoshima Prefectural Assembly. In terms of national politics, the town is part of the Kagoshima 3rd district of the lower house of the Diet of Japan.

== Economy ==
The economy of Yūsui is based largely on agriculture.

== Education ==
Yūsui has five public elementary high schools and two public junior high schools operated by the town government. The town does not have a high school.

== Transportation ==
=== Railways ===
JR Kyushu - Hisatsu Line

■ Yoshimatsu - Kurino

JR Kyushu - Kitto Line

■ Yoshimatsu - Tsurumaru

=== Highways ===
- Kyushu Expressway: Yoshimatsu PA - Kurino IC
- National Route 268

== Local attractions ==
- Kirishima Open Air Museum
