= Yoshimatsu (name) =

- Pronunciation: joɕimatsɯ (IPA)

Origin
- Origin: Japanese
- Meaning: Different meanings depending on the kanji used

Other names
- Alternative spelling: Yosimatu (Kunrei-shiki) Yosimatu (Nihon-shiki) Yoshimatsu (Hepburn)

Yoshimatsu is both a masculine Japanese given name and a Japanese surname.

== Written forms ==
Yoshimatsu can be written using different combinations of kanji characters. Here are some examples:

- 義松, "justice, pine tree"
- 義末, "justice, end"
- 佳松, "skilled, pine tree"
- 佳末, "skilled, end"
- 善松, "virtuous, pine tree"
- 善末, "virtuous, end"
- 吉松, "good luck, pine tree"
- 吉末, "good luck, end"
- 良松, "good, pine tree"
- 良末, "good, end"
- 恭松, "respectful, pine tree"
- 嘉松, "excellent, pine tree"
- 嘉末, "excellent, end"
- 能松, "capacity, pine tree"
- 喜松, "rejoice, pine tree"

The name can also be written in hiragana よしまつ or katakana ヨシマツ.

== Notable people with the given name Yoshimatsu ==
- Yoshimatsu Oyama (大山 義松), Japanese footballer

== Notable people with the surname Yoshimatsu ==
- Ikumi Yoshimatsu (吉松 育美, born 1987), Japanese beauty pageant winner
- Shigetaro Yoshimatsu (吉松 茂太郎, 1859–1935), Japanese admiral
- Takashi Yoshimatsu (吉松 隆, born 1953), Japanese composer
- Yoshihiko Yoshimatsu (吉松 義彦, 1920–1988), Japanese judoka
