= 2016 Hokkaido Consadole Sapporo season =

Hokkaido Consadole Sapporo
2016 season
- Manager: Shuhei Yomoda
- Stadium: Sapporo Dome
- J2 League: 1st

2016 Hokkaido Consadole Sapporo season.

== J2 League ==
=== League table ===
| Pos | Team | Pld | W | D | L | GF | GA | GD | Pts | Promotion, qualification or relegation |
|---|---|---|---|---|---|---|---|---|---|---|
| 1 | Consadole Sapporo (C, P) | 42 | 25 | 10 | 7 | 65 | 33 | +32 | 85 | Promotion to 2017 J1 League |
| 2 | Shimizu S-Pulse (P) | 42 | 25 | 9 | 8 | 85 | 37 | +48 | 84 | Promotion to 2017 J1 League |
| 3 | Matsumoto Yamaga | 42 | 24 | 12 | 6 | 62 | 32 | +30 | 84 | Qualification for promotion playoffs (Note: Only teams that meet J1 license criteria can participate in promotion playoffs. If one or more teams fail to meet the criteria, only eligible teams that finished 3rd to 6th will participate and no replacement teams will be added.) |

Updated to match(es) played on 20 November 2016. Source: 2016 MEIJI YASUDA J2 LEAGUE League table
Rules for classification: 1) Points; 2) Goal difference; 3) Goals scored
(C) Champions; (P) Promoted

=== Match details ===
J2 League match details
| Match | Date | Team | Score | Team | Venue | Attendance |
|---|---|---|---|---|---|---|
| 1 | 2016.02.28 | Tokyo Verdy | 1-0 | Hokkaido Consadole Sapporo | Ajinomoto Stadium | 9,272 |
| 2 | 2016.03.06 | FC Gifu | 0-4 | Hokkaido Consadole Sapporo | Gifu Nagaragawa Stadium | 4,898 |
| 3 | 2016.03.13 | Hokkaido Consadole Sapporo | 1-1 | Ehime FC | Sapporo Dome | 20,012 |
| 4 | 2016.03.20 | Shimizu S-Pulse | 0-2 | Hokkaido Consadole Sapporo | IAI Stadium Nihondaira | 12,624 |
| 5 | 2016.03.26 | Hokkaido Consadole Sapporo | 3-1 | Kyoto Sanga FC | Sapporo Dome | 9,341 |
| 6 | 2016.04.03 | FC Machida Zelvia | 2-0 | Hokkaido Consadole Sapporo | Machida Stadium | 7,146 |
| 7 | 2016.04.09 | Hokkaido Consadole Sapporo | 1-0 | Fagiano Okayama | Sapporo Dome | 9,467 |
| 8 | 2016.04.17 | Montedio Yamagata | 1-1 | Hokkaido Consadole Sapporo | ND Soft Stadium Yamagata | 4,871 |
| 9 | 2016.04.23 | Hokkaido Consadole Sapporo | 1-0 | Cerezo Osaka | Sapporo Dome | 21,640 |
| 10 | 2016.04.29 | Hokkaido Consadole Sapporo | 1-0 | Tokushima Vortis | Sapporo Dome | 14,186 |
| 11 | 2016.05.03 | Zweigen Kanazawa | 0-1 | Hokkaido Consadole Sapporo | Ishikawa Athletics Stadium | 4,623 |
| 13 | 2016.05.15 | Mito HollyHock | 0-1 | Hokkaido Consadole Sapporo | K's denki Stadium Mito | 6,028 |
| 14 | 2016.05.22 | Kamatamare Sanuki | 0-1 | Hokkaido Consadole Sapporo | Pikara Stadium | 3,208 |
| 15 | 2016.05.28 | Hokkaido Consadole Sapporo | 3-1 | Renofa Yamaguchi FC | Sapporo Dome | 10,920 |
| 16 | 2016.06.04 | Hokkaido Consadole Sapporo | 2-2 | JEF United Chiba | Sapporo Dome | 11,937 |
| 17 | 2016.06.08 | Matsumoto Yamaga FC | 3-2 | Hokkaido Consadole Sapporo | Matsumotodaira Park Stadium | 10,796 |
| 18 | 2016.06.13 | Hokkaido Consadole Sapporo | 2-1 | V-Varen Nagasaki | Sapporo Dome | 10,607 |
| 19 | 2016.06.19 | Hokkaido Consadole Sapporo | 1-0 | Giravanz Kitakyushu | Sapporo Dome | 11,957 |
| 20 | 2016.06.26 | Thespakusatsu Gunma | 0-1 | Hokkaido Consadole Sapporo | Shoda Shoyu Stadium Gunma | 3,184 |
| 21 | 2016.07.03 | Hokkaido Consadole Sapporo | 5-2 | Yokohama FC | Chiyogadai Park Athletic Studium | 10,442 |
| 22 | 2016.07.09 | Cerezo Osaka | 0-0 | Hokkaido Consadole Sapporo | Kincho Stadium | 13,443 |
| 23 | 2016.07.16 | Fagiano Okayama | 0-0 | Hokkaido Consadole Sapporo | City Light Stadium | 13,304 |
| 24 | 2016.07.20 | Hokkaido Consadole Sapporo | 1-0 | Matsumoto Yamaga FC | Sapporo Dome | 12,901 |
| 25 | 2016.07.25 | Hokkaido Consadole Sapporo | 5-0 | FC Gifu | Sapporo Dome | 11,301 |
| 26 | 2016.07.31 | Renofa Yamaguchi FC | 1-2 | Hokkaido Consadole Sapporo | Ishin Memorial Park Stadium | 7,510 |
| 27 | 2016.08.07 | Hokkaido Consadole Sapporo | 3-2 | Shimizu S-Pulse | Sapporo Dome | 17,576 |
| 28 | 2016.08.11 | Yokohama FC | 1-0 | Hokkaido Consadole Sapporo | NHK Spring Mitsuzawa Football Stadium | 6,843 |
| 29 | 2016.08.14 | Hokkaido Consadole Sapporo | 3-1 | Montedio Yamagata | Sapporo Dome | 20,225 |
| 30 | 2016.08.21 | Kyoto Sanga FC | 0-0 | Hokkaido Consadole Sapporo | Kyoto Nishikyogoku Athletic Stadium | 7,464 |
| 12 | 2016.08.25 | Hokkaido Consadole Sapporo | 1-0 | Roasso Kumamoto | Sapporo Dome | 9,834 |
| 31 | 2016.09.11 | Hokkaido Consadole Sapporo | 3-1 | Thespakusatsu Gunma | Sapporo Atsubetsu Stadium | 9,056 |
| 32 | 2016.09.18 | V-Varen Nagasaki | 0-0 | Hokkaido Consadole Sapporo | Transcosmos Stadium Nagasaki | 6,615 |
| 33 | 2016.09.26 | Hokkaido Consadole Sapporo | 3-2 | FC Machida Zelvia | Sapporo Dome | 11,914 |
| 34 | 2016.10.02 | Giravanz Kitakyushu | 0-0 | Hokkaido Consadole Sapporo | Honjo Stadium | 3,095 |
| 35 | 2016.10.08 | Hokkaido Consadole Sapporo | 1-0 | Mito HollyHock | Sapporo Atsubetsu Stadium | 8,269 |
| 36 | 2016.10.16 | Ehime FC | 2-2 | Hokkaido Consadole Sapporo | Ningineer Stadium | 2,916 |
| 37 | 2016.10.22 | Hokkaido Consadole Sapporo | 1-2 | Tokyo Verdy | Sapporo Dome | 18,868 |
| 38 | 2016.10.30 | Roasso Kumamoto | 2-0 | Hokkaido Consadole Sapporo | Umakana-Yokana Stadium | 7,880 |
| 39 | 2016.11.03 | Hokkaido Consadole Sapporo | 4-1 | Kamatamare Sanuki | Sapporo Dome | 21,582 |
| 40 | 2016.11.06 | Tokushima Vortis | 2-1 | Hokkaido Consadole Sapporo | Pocarisweat Stadium | 4,402 |
| 41 | 2016.11.12 | JEF United Chiba | 1-2 | Hokkaido Consadole Sapporo | Fukuda Denshi Arena | 12,726 |
| 42 | 2016.11.20 | Hokkaido Consadole Sapporo | 0-0 | Zweigen Kanazawa | Sapporo Dome | 33,697 |
