= Yoshimatsu, Kagoshima =

Dissolved municipality in Kagoshima prefecture, Japan

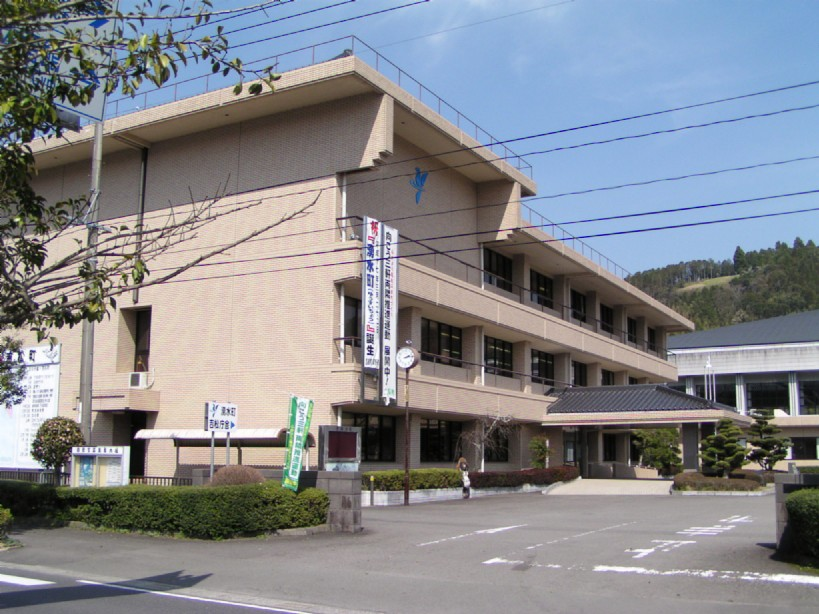
Yokomatsu city hall (former office for the village of Yokomatsu).

Yoshimatsu (吉松町, Yoshimatsu-chō) was a town located in Aira District, Kagoshima Prefecture, Japan.

As of 2003, the town had an estimated population of 4,818 and the density of 88.44 persons per km^{2}. The total area was 54.48 km^{2}.

On March 22, 2005, Yoshimatsu, along with the town of Kurino (also from Aira District), was merged to create the town of Yūsui and no longer exists as an independent municipality.
