= Kirishima Open Air Museum =

- 霧島アートの森
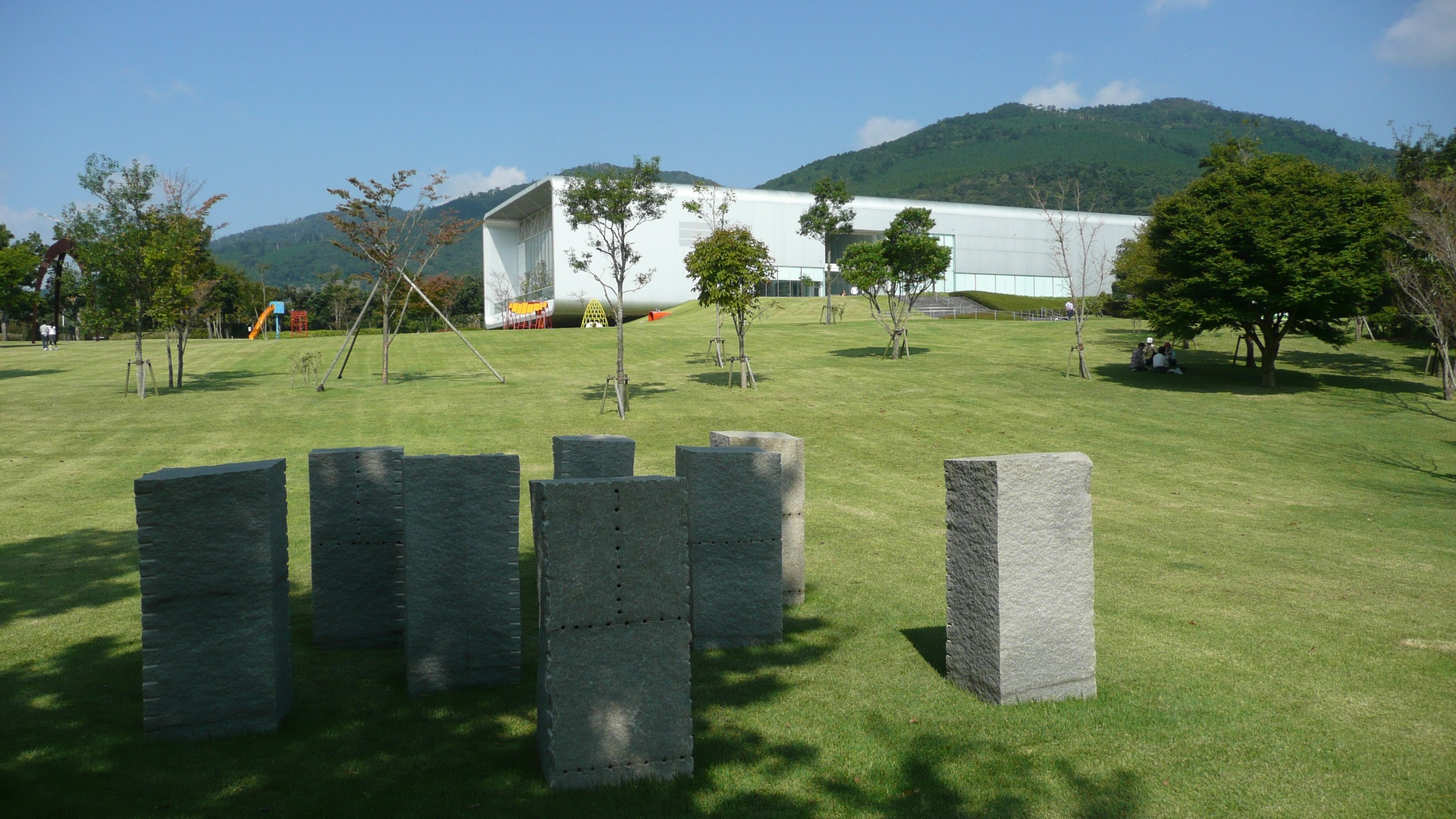
- Interactive map of the Kirishima Open Air Museum area

General information
- Location: 220 Koba 6340, Yūsui, Kagoshima Prefecture, Japan
- Coordinates: 31°56′23″N 130°46′43″E
- Opened: 12 October 2000

Design and construction
- Architect: Hayakawa Kunihiko (早川邦彦)

Website
- Official website

Kirishima Open Air Museum (霧島アートの森, Kirishima āto no mori) opened in Yūsui, Kagoshima Prefecture, Japan, in 2000. Located in the foothills of Mount Kirishima, at an elevation of 700 m (2,300 ft) above sea level, the Museum encompasses an area of 20 ha (49 acres). Works are displayed in the open air as well as in the Art Hall.

== See also ==
- Kirishima-Yaku National Park
