= Kurino, Kagoshima =

Dissolved municipality in Kagoshima prefecture, Japan

Kurino (栗野町, Kurino-chō) was a town located in Aira District, Kagoshima Prefecture, Japan.

As of 2003, the town had an estimated population of 8,022 and the density of 89.28 persons per km^{2}. The total area was 89.85 km^{2}.

On March 22, 2005, Kurino, along with the town of Yoshimatsu (also from Aira District), was merged to create the town of Yūsui and no longer exists as an independent municipality.
